= Cusco =

City in Peru

Cusco Cusco or Cuzco Qosqo or Qusqu (Quechua)
- City
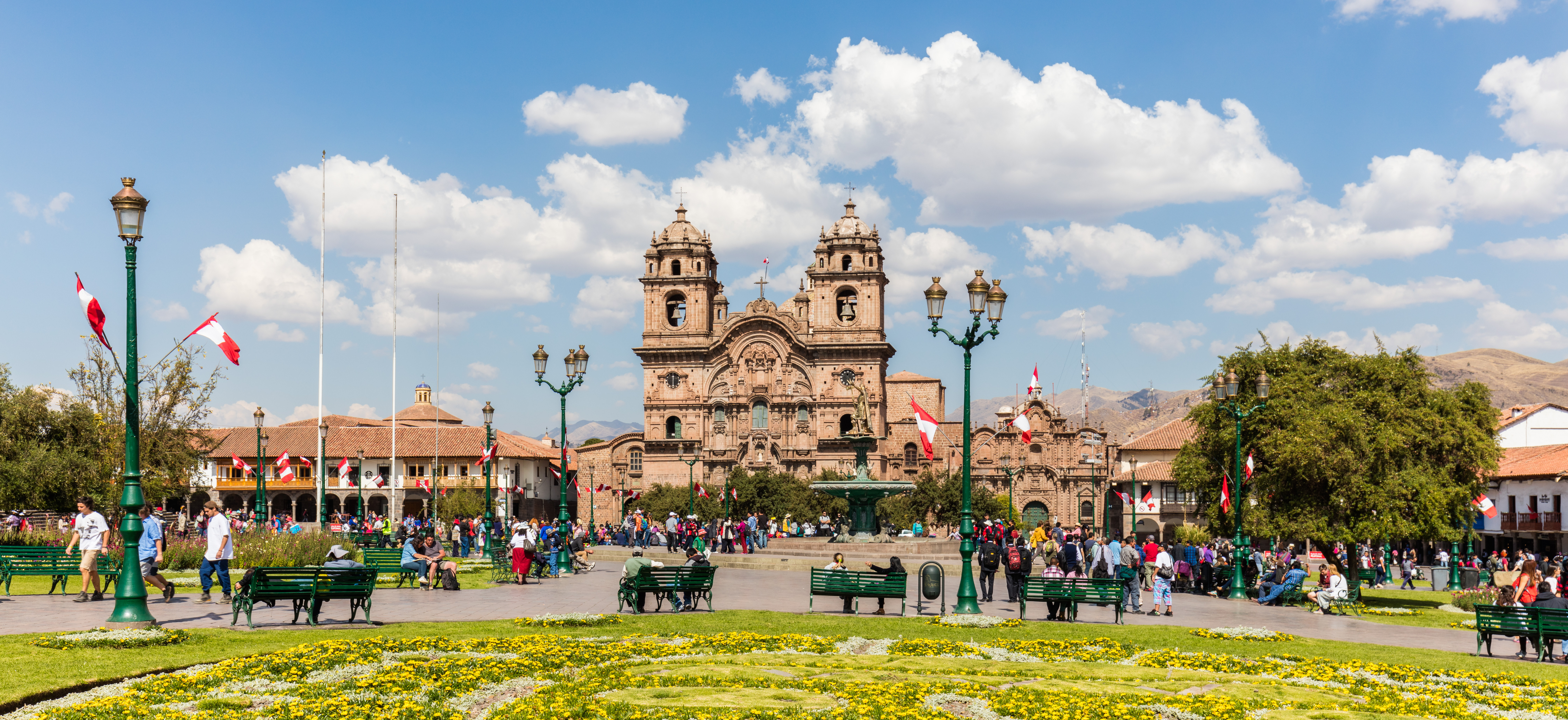
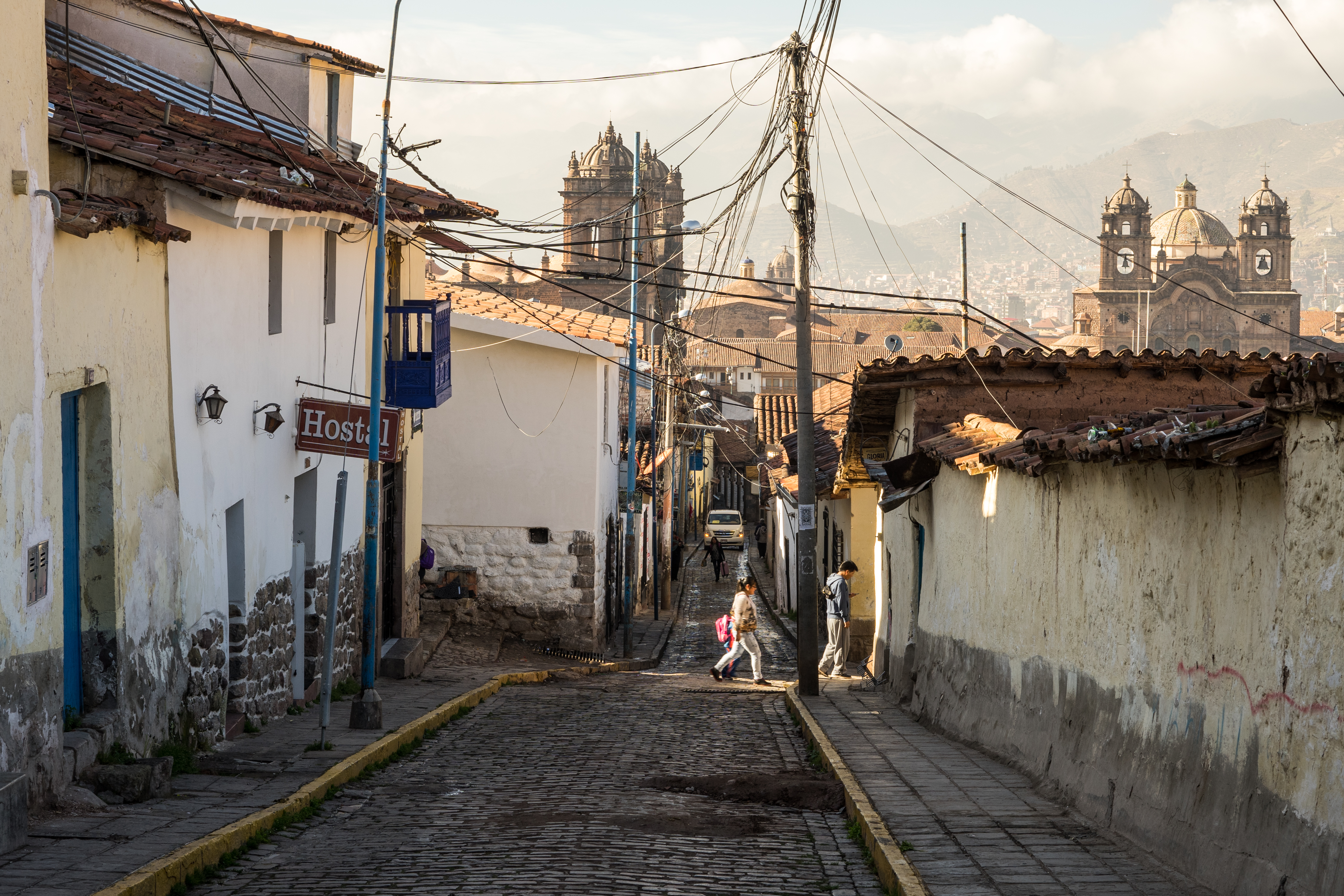
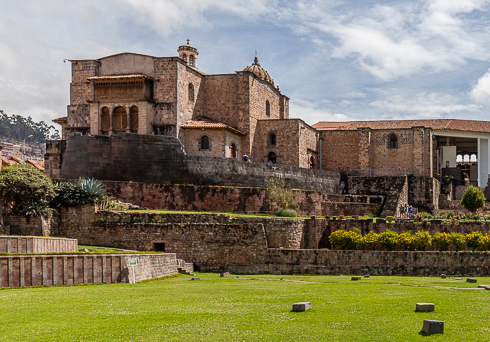
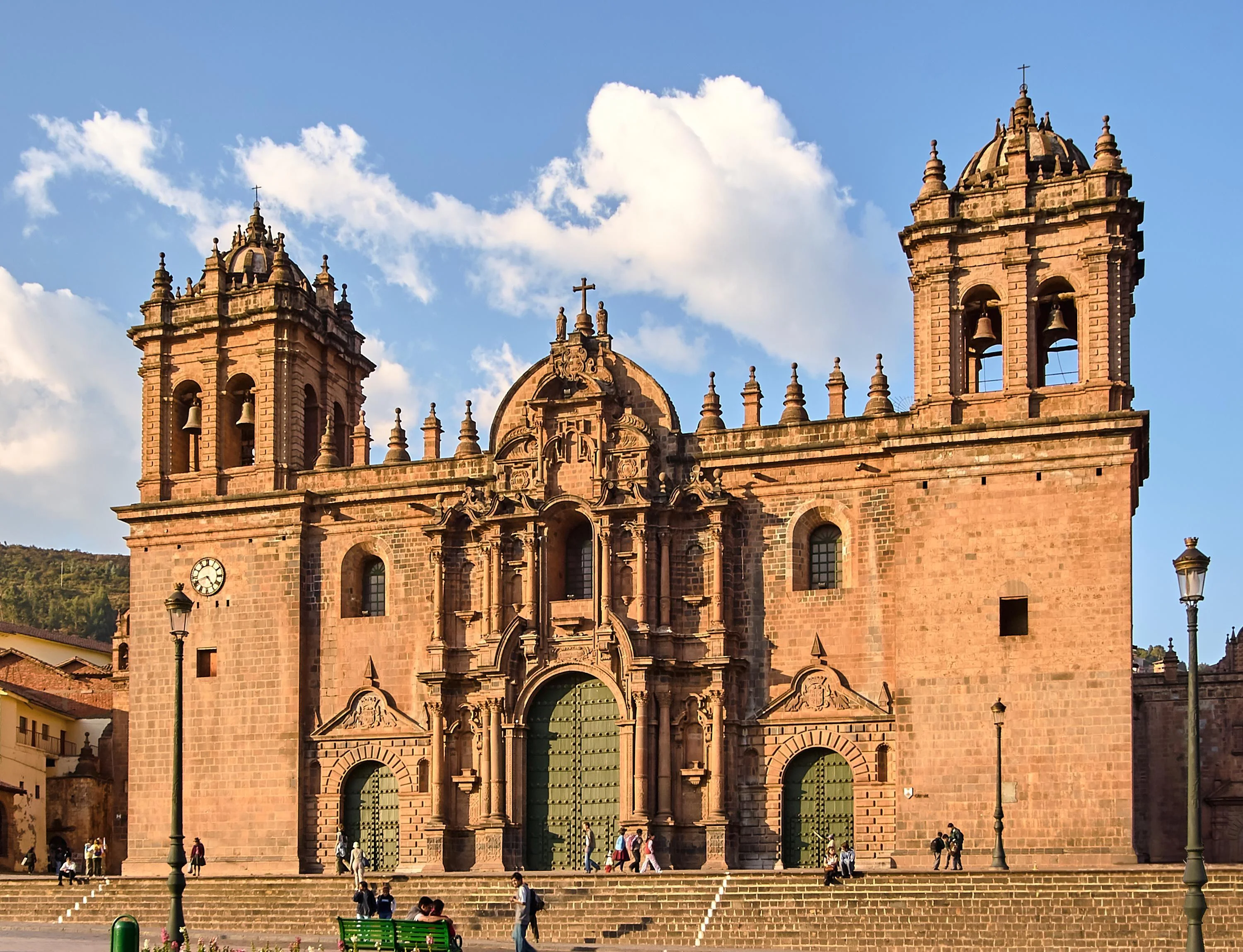
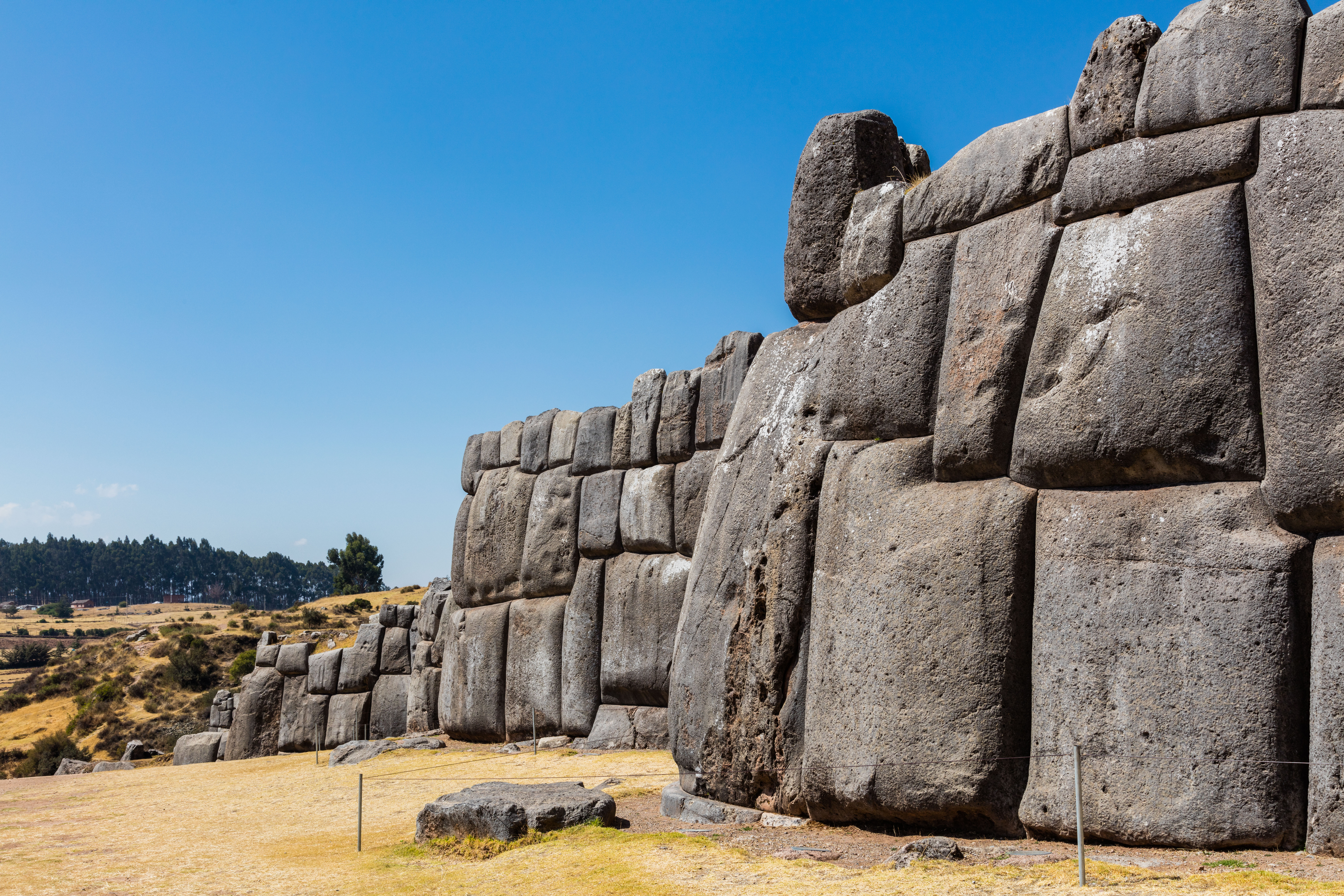
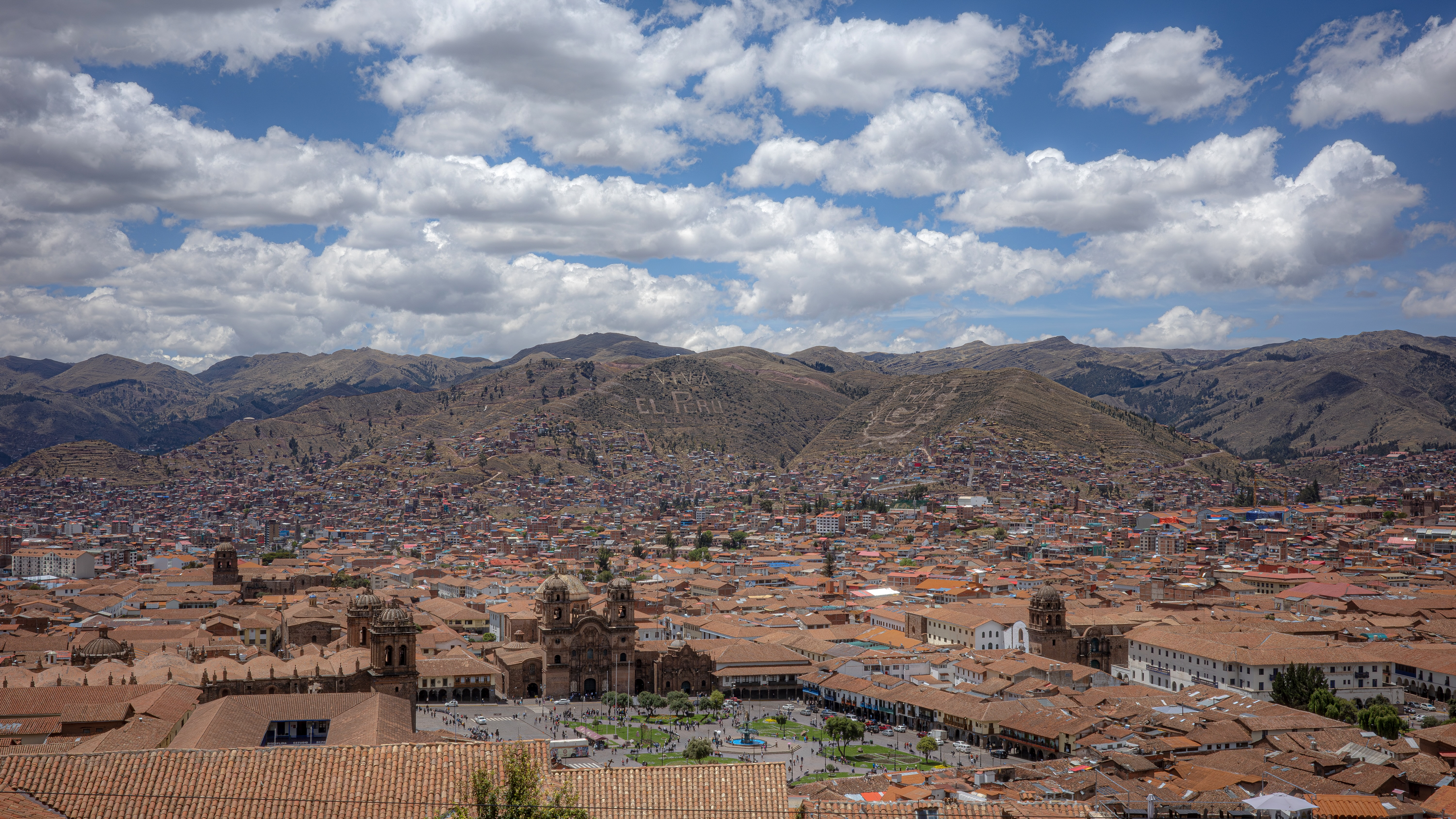
- Plaza de Armas with Iglesia de la Compañía de Jesús in the background Calle Suecia Qorikancha Cusco Cathedral Sacsayhuamán Historic Centre

- Flag Coat of arms
- Nicknames: La Ciudad Imperial (The Imperial City), El Ombligo del Mundo (The Navel of the World)
- Anthem: Himno del Cusco; Qosqo yupaychana taki (English: "Anthem of Cusco")
- Interactive map of Cusco
- Location within Peru Location within South America Location within Earth
- Coordinates: 13°31′01″S 71°58′43″W
- Country: Peru
- Region: Cusco
- Province: Cusco
- Pre-Colonial Era: c. 1200 CE
- Colonial Era: 23 March 1534
- Founder: (c.1200) Manqu Qhapaq (1534) Francisco Pizarro

Government
  - Type: Municipality
  - Body: Municipality of Cusco
  - Mayor: Luis Beltrán Pantoja Calvo

Area
  - Total: 385.1 km^{2} (148.7 sq mi)
- Elevation: 3,399 m (11,152 ft)

Population (2017)
  - Total: 428,450
  - Rank: 7th in Peru
  - Density: 1,113/km^{2} (2,882/sq mi)
- Demonym(s): cuzqueño/a, cusqueño/a

Demographics (Note: Based on the 2017 National Census, which included, for the first time, a question of ethnic self-identification that was addressed to people aged 12 and over considering elements such as their ancestry, their customs and their family origin to visualize and better understand the cultural reality of the country.)
  - Ethnic groups: 64.0% Native; 63.0% Quechua; 0.8% Aimara; 0.1% Amazonian (Note: Includes Asháninka, Awajún, Shipibo-Konibo and Shawi.); 0.1% Other indigenous groups (Note: Includes Nikkei, Tusan, among others.); 31.0% Mestizo (mixed White and Indigenous); 1.9% White; 0.8% Other; 2.3% No answer

GDP (PPP, constant 2015 values)
  - Year: 2023
  - Total: $4.2 billion
- Time zone: UTC−05:00 (PET)
- UBIGEO: 08000
- Area code: 84

UNESCO World Heritage Site
- Official name: City of Cusco
- Location: South America
- Criteria: Cultural: iii, iv
- Reference: 273
- Inscription: 1983 (7th Session)
- Area: 142.48 ha (352.1 acres)
- Buffer zone: 284.93 ha (704.1 acres)

Cusco or Cuzco (Note: Cusco has been the preferred spelling since 1976; see § Spelling and etymology.) (/ˈkuːskoʊ/; Latin American Spanish: [ˈkusko]; Quechua: Qusqu/Qosqo [ˈqosqɔ]) is a city in southeastern Peru, near the Sacred Valley of the Andes mountain range, and the Huatanay and Urubamba rivers. It is the capital and largest city of the eponymous Cusco Province and Cusco Department. It has historically been one of the largest cultural, economic and political centers of Peru.

The region was inhabited by the Killke culture in the 10th century, with the fortress Sacsayhuamán being constructed in the 11th century. The city was originally founded in the 12th century by Manco Cápac, as the capital of the Kingdom of Cusco and, later, of the Inca Empire. The region was conquered in the 16th century by the Spanish and reestablished on 23 March 1534, with most of the city being constructed over monuments left from the Inca Empire. In 1983, Cusco was declared a World Heritage Site by UNESCO with the title "City of Cusco". It has become a major tourist destination, hosting over 2 million visitors a year and providing passage to numerous Incan ruins, such as Machu Picchu, one of the seven modern wonders of the world. The Constitution of Peru (1993) designates the city as the Historical Capital of Peru.

Cusco is the seventh-most populous city in Peru; in 2017, it had a population of 428,450. It is also the largest city in the Peruvian Andes and the region is the seventh-most populous metropolitan area of Peru. Its elevation is around 3,400 m (11,200 ft). The largest district in the city is the Cusco District, which had a population of 114,630 in 2017, making up about one quarter of the city's total population.

== Spelling and etymology ==
The indigenous name of this city is Qusqu. Although the name was used in Southern Quechua, its origin is found in the Aymara language. The word is derived from the phrase qusqu wanka ('rock of the owl'), related to the city's foundation myth of the Ayar siblings. According to this legend, Ayar Awqa (Ayar Auca) acquired wings and flew to the site of the future city; there he was transformed into a rock to mark the possession of the land by his ayllu ("lineage"):

Then Ayar Oche stood up, displayed a pair of large wings, and said he should be the one to stay at Guanacaure as an idol in order to speak with their father the Sun. Then they went up on top of the hill. Now at the site where he was to remain as an idol, Ayar Oche raised up in flight toward the heavens so high that they could not see him. He returned and told Ayar Manco that from then on he was to be named Manco Capac. Ayar Oche came from where the Sun was and the Sun had ordered that Ayar Manco take that name and go to the town that they had seen. After this had been stated by the idol, Ayar Oche turned into a stone, just as he was, with his wings. Later Manco Capac went down with Ayar Auca to their settlement...he liked the place now occupied in this city Cuzco. Manco Capac and his companion, with the help of the four women, made a house. Having done this, Manco Capac and his companion, with the four women, planted some land with maize. It is said that they took the maize from the cave, which this lord Manco Capac named Pacaritambo, which means those of origin because...they came out of that cave.

The Spanish conquistadors (Spanish soldiers) adopted the local name, transcribing it according to Spanish phonetics as Cuzco or, less often, Cozco. Cuzco was the standard spelling on official documents and chronicles in colonial times, though Cusco was also used. Cuzco, pronounced as in 16th-century Spanish, seems to have been a close approximation to the Cusco Quechua pronunciation of the name at the time.

As both Spanish and Quechua pronunciation have evolved since then, the Spanish pronunciation of 'z' is no longer universally close to the Quechua pronunciation. In 1976, the city mayor signed an ordinance banning the traditional spelling and ordering the use of a new spelling, Cusco, in municipality publications. Nineteen years later, on 23 June 1990, the local authorities formalized a new spelling more closely related to Quechua, Qosqo, but later administrations have not followed suit.

There is no international, official spelling of the city's name. In English-language publications both "s" and "z" can be found. The Oxford Dictionary of English and Merriam-Webster Dictionary prefer "Cuzco", and in scholarly writings "Cuzco" is used more often than "Cusco". The city's international airport code is CUZ, reflecting the earlier Spanish spelling.

== Symbols ==
=== Flag ===
The official Flag of Cusco consists of seven horizontal stripes in the colors red, orange, yellow, green, sky blue, blue, and violet, representing the rainbow. This flag was introduced in 1973 by Raúl Montesinos Espejo in celebration of the 25th anniversary of his Tawantinsuyo Radio station. Its popularity led to its official adoption by the Municipality of Cusco in 1978. Since 2021, the flag has also included the golden Sol de Echenique, a symbol associated with the city's historical identity.

=== Coat of arms ===
The Coat of arms of Cusco was officially adopted in 1986 and is used by the city, province, and region of Cusco. The coat of arms incorporates elements from both Inca and Spanish heraldry. Historically, the city's arms included a golden castle on a red field with eight condors surrounding it. The modern design, officially adopted in 1986, features the Sol de Echenique, a golden sun emblem, as the central element, symbolizing the city's connection to its Inca heritage.

=== Anthem ===
The Anthem of Cusco was composed by Roberto Ojeda Campana with lyrics by Luis Nieto Miranda in 1944. It was officially adopted as the city's anthem and has been sung at public events since then. In 1991, the anthem was translated into Quechua by Faustino Espinoza Navarro and Mario Mejía Waman. The anthem is performed in both Spanish and Quechua, reflecting the city's cultural diversity and historical significance. In 2019, the Municipality of Cusco declared the performance of the anthem in Quechua at civic events to be of public interest and historical importance.

== History ==
=== Killke culture ===
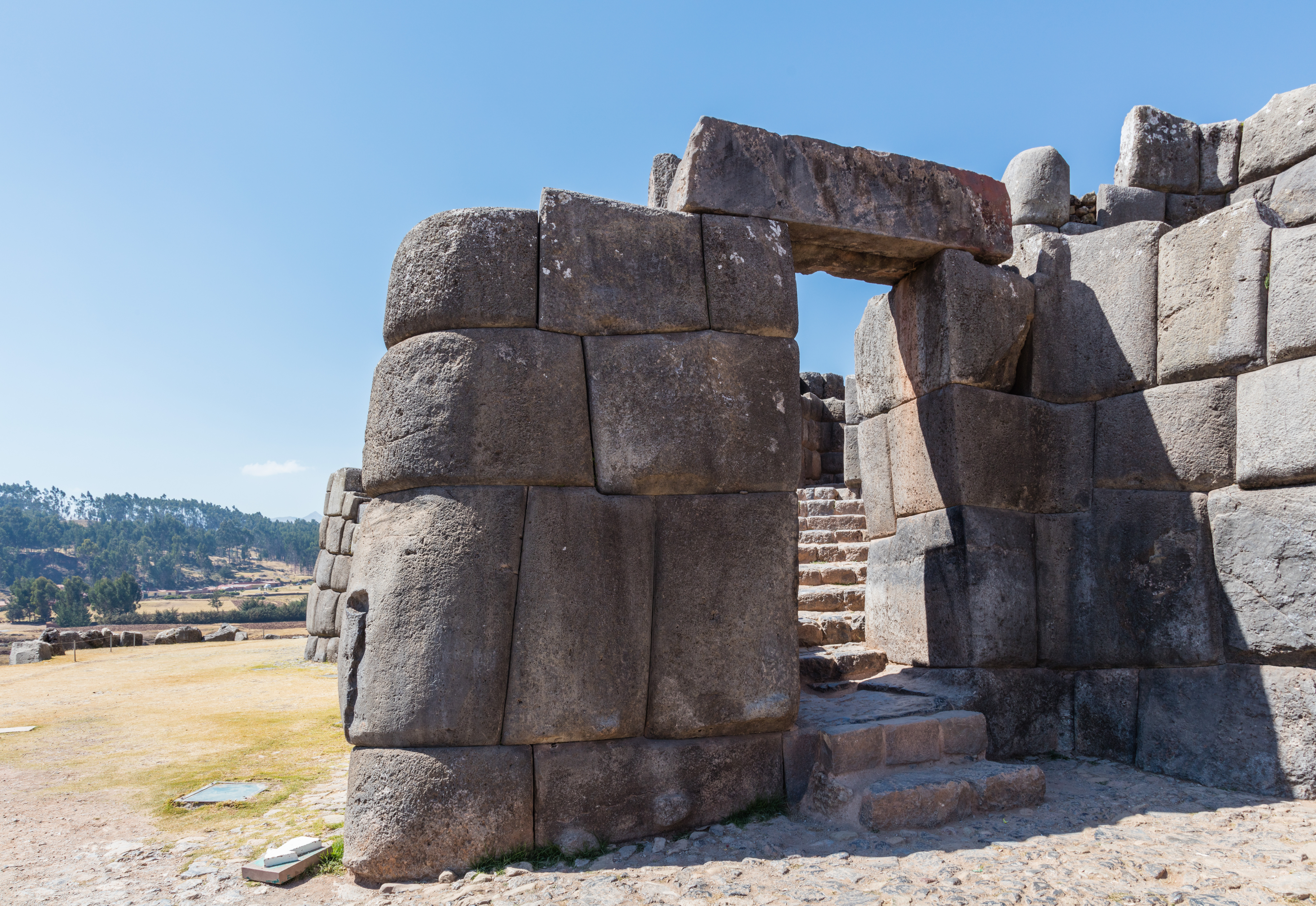
Sacsayhuamán is an Inca ceremonial fortress located two kilometers north from Cusco.

The Killke people occupied the region from 900 to 1200 AD, prior to the arrival of the Inca in the 13th century. Carbon-14 dating of Saksaywaman, the walled complex outside Cusco, established that Killke constructed the fortress about 1100 AD. The Inca later expanded and occupied the complex in the 13th century. In March 2008, archeologists discovered the ruins of an ancient temple, roadway and aqueduct system at Saksaywaman. The temple covers some 2,700 square feet (250 square meters) and contains 11 rooms thought to have held idols and mummies, establishing its religious purpose. Together with the results of excavations in 2007, when another temple was found at the edge of the fortress, this indicates a longtime religious as well as military use of the facility.

=== Inca period ===
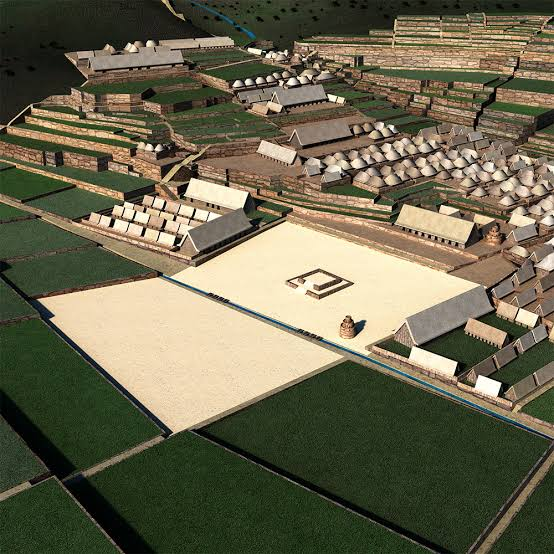
3D reconstruction of Cusco during the early Inca period.

Cusco was long an important center of indigenous people. It was the capital of the Inca Empire (13th century – 1532). Many believe that the city was planned as an effigy in the shape of a puma, a sacred animal. How Cusco was specifically built, or how its large stones were quarried and transported to the site remain undetermined. Under the Inca, the city had two sectors: the hurin and hanan. Each was divided to encompass two of the four provinces, Chinchasuyu (NW), Antisuyu (NE), Kuntisuyu (SW) and Qullasuyu (SE). A road led from each quarter to the corresponding quarter of the empire.

Each local leader was required to build a house in the city and live part of the year in Cusco, restricted to the quarter that corresponded to the quarter in which he held territory. After the rule of Pachacuti, when an Inca died, his title went to one son and his property was given to a corporation controlled by his other relatives (split inheritance). Each title holder had to build a new house and add new lands to the empire in order to own land for his family to keep after his death.

According to Inca legend, the city was rebuilt by Sapa Inca Pachacuti, the man who transformed the Kingdom of Cusco from a sleepy city-state into the vast empire of Tawantinsuyu. Archeological evidence, however, points to a slower, more organic growth of the city beginning before Pachacuti. The city was constructed according to a definite plan in which two rivers were channeled around the city. Archeologists have suggested that this city plan was replicated at other sites.

The city fell to the sphere of Huáscar during the Inca Civil War after the death of Huayna Capac in 1528. It was captured by the generals of Atahualpa in April 1532 in the Battle of Quipaipan. Nineteen months later, Spanish explorers invaded the city after kidnapping and murdering Atahualpa (see Battle of Cuzco), and gained control.

=== Spanish conquest ===
The first three Spaniards arrived in the city in May 1533, after the Battle of Cajamarca, collecting for Atahualpa's Ransom Room. On 15 November 1533 Francisco Pizarro officially arrived in Cusco. "The capital of the Incas ... astonished the Spaniards by the beauty of its edifices, the length and regularity of its streets." The great square was surrounded by several palaces, since "each sovereign built a new palace for himself." Another member of the invading party recorded that "In the delicacy of the stone work, the natives far excelled the Spaniards." The fortress had three parapets and was composed of "heavy masses of rock". "Through the heart of the capital ran a river ... faced with stone. ... The most sumptuous edifice in Cuzco ... was undoubtedly the great temple dedicated to the Sun ... studded with gold plates ... surrounded by convents and dormitories for the priests. ... The palaces were numerous and the troops lost no time in plundering them of their contents, as well as despoiling the religious edifices", including the royal mummies in the Coricancha.

Pizarro ceremoniously gave Manco Inca the Incan fringe as the new Peruvian leader. Pizarro encouraged some of his men to stay and settle in the city, giving out repartimientos, or land grants to do so. Alcaldes were established and regidores on 24 March 1534, which included the brothers Gonzalo Pizarro and Juan Pizarro. Pizarro left a garrison of 90 men and departed for Jauja with Manco Inca.

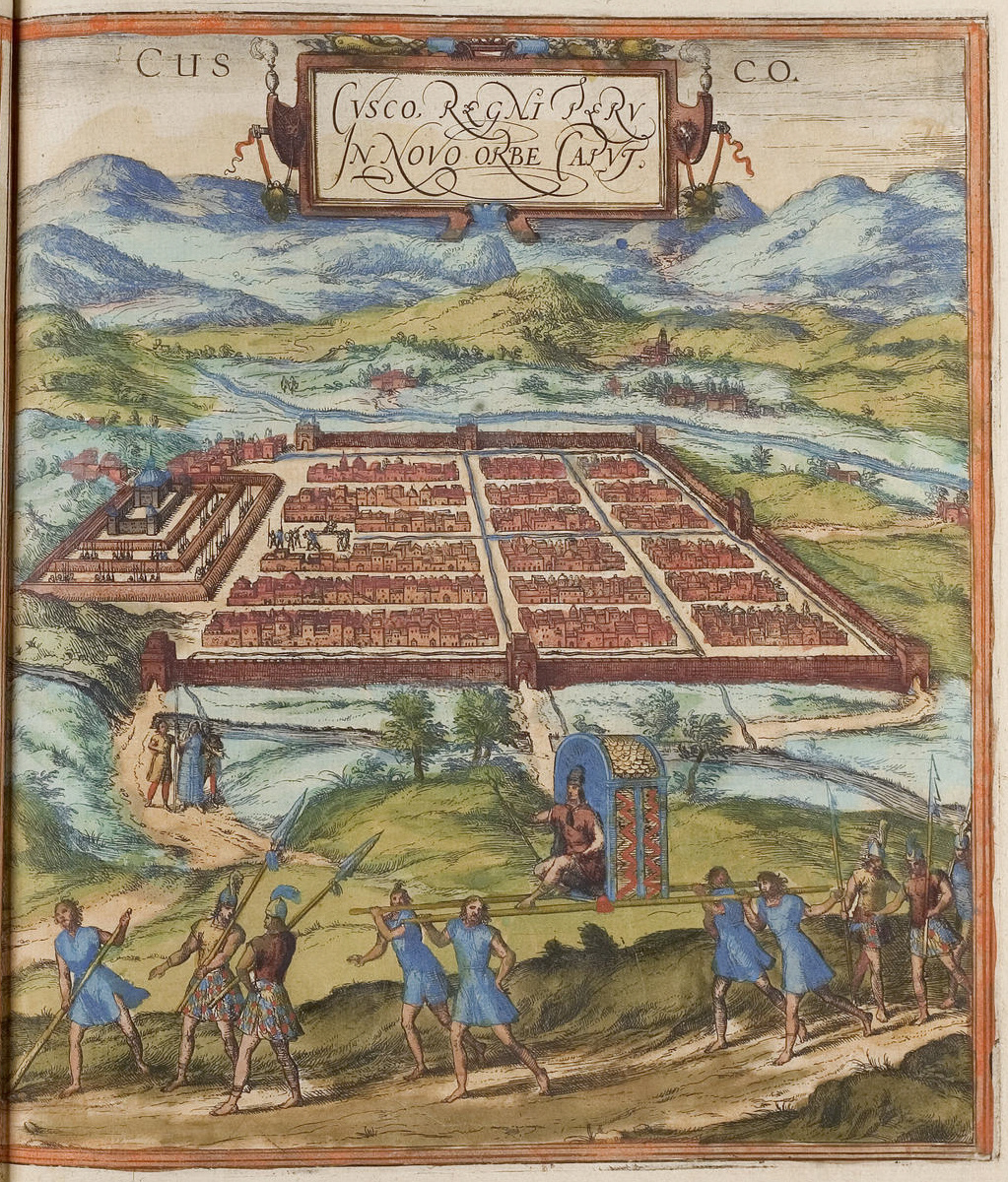
Map showing the city of Cusco during the Inca Empire. Painting of 1565 by Giovanni Battista Ramusio.

Pizarro renamed it as the "very noble and great city of Cuzco". Buildings often constructed after the Spanish invasion have a mixture of Spanish influence and Inca indigenous architecture, including the Santa Clara and San Blas neighborhoods. The Spanish destroyed many Inca buildings, temples and palaces. They used the remaining walls as bases for the construction of a new city, and this stone masonry is still visible.

Father Vincente de Valverde became the Bishop of Cusco and built his cathedral facing the plaza. He supported construction of the Dominican Order monastery (Santo Domingo Convent) on the ruins of the Corichanca, House of the Sun, and a convent at the former site of the House of the Virgins of the Sun.

During the Siege of Cuzco of 1536 by Manco Inca Yupanqui, a leader of the Sapa Inca, he took control of the city from the Spanish. Although the siege lasted 10 months, it was ultimately unsuccessful. Manco's forces were able to reclaim the city for only a few days. He eventually retreated to Vilcabamba, the capital of the newly established small Neo-Inca State. There his state survived another 36 years but he was never able to return to Cuzco. Throughout the conflict and years of the Spanish colonization of the Americas, many Incas died of smallpox epidemics, as they had no acquired immunity to a disease by then endemic among Europeans.

Cusco was built on layers of cultures. The Tawantinsuyu (former Inca Empire) was built on Killke structures. The Spanish replaced indigenous temples with Catholic churches, and Inca palaces with mansions for the invaders.

Cusco was the center for the Spanish colonization and spread of Christianity in the Andean world. It became very prosperous thanks to agriculture, cattle raising and mining, as well as its trade with Spain. The Spanish colonists constructed many churches and convents, as well as a cathedral, university and archdiocese.

=== Colonial era ===
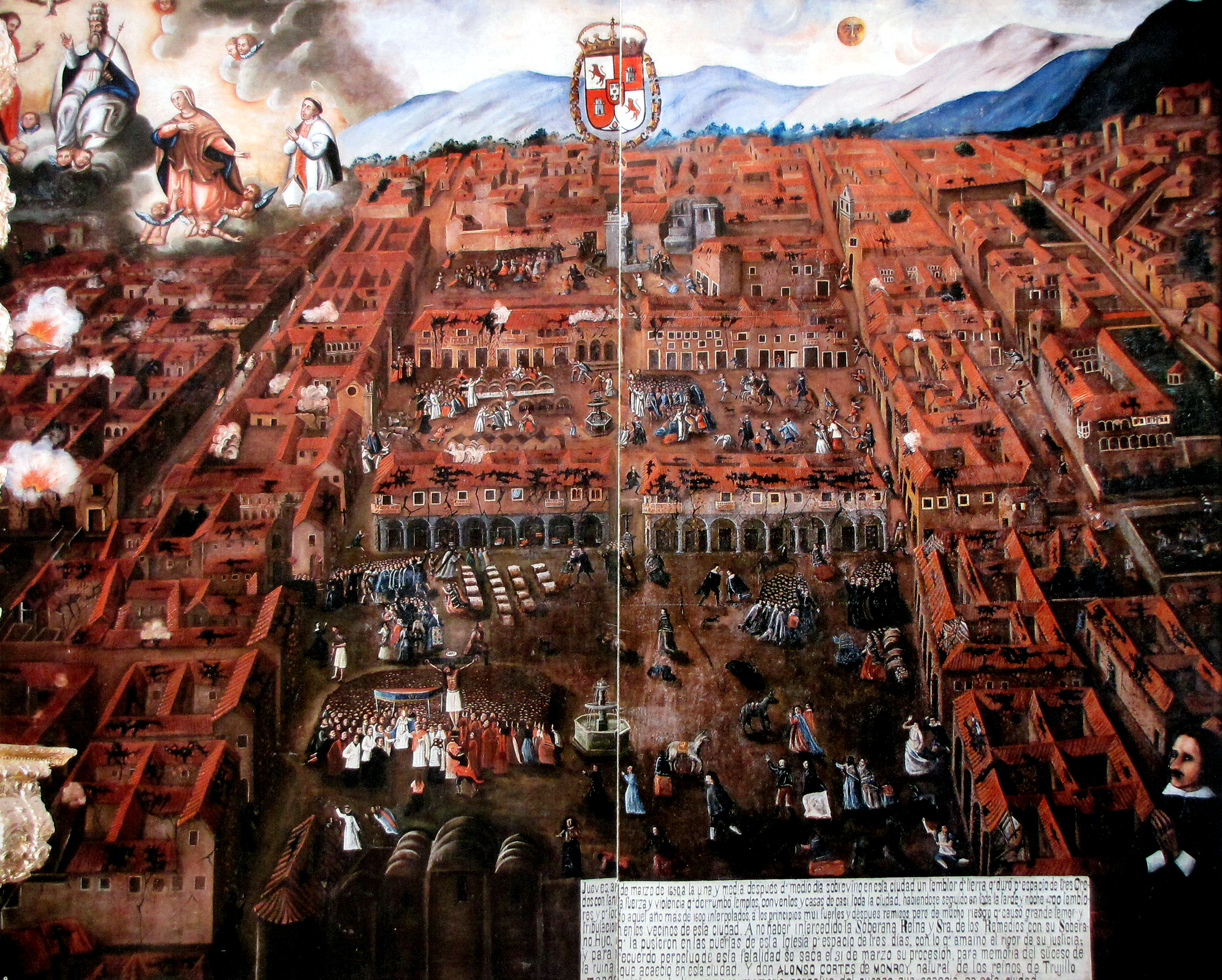
Painting of Cusco during the earthquake in 1650.

Urban development was interrupted by several earthquakes that devastated the city on more than one occasion. In 1650, a violent earthquake destroyed almost all the colonial-era buildings. During this earthquake, the effigy of the Lord of the Earthquakes gained great importance and is still carried in procession every year.

As a consequence of the 18th century Bourbon Reforms, the city of Cusco was convulsed by the large indigenous rebellion initiated by the cacique José Gabriel Condorcanqui, or Túpac Amaru II, who rose up against the Spanish administration. His army sieged the city in 1781. His uprising was suppressed after several months of fighting, during which he challenged the viceregal authorities stationed in Cusco. Túpac Amaru II was defeated, taken prisoner, and executed along with his entire family in the Plaza de Armas of Cusco. However, despite the execution of the rebellions main leaders, the rebellion persisted up until 1783, led by other leaders such as Túpac Katari and Diego Cristóbal. The chapel that served as the leader's prison still stands today, next to the Church of the Society of Jesus. This movement spread rapidly throughout the Andes and marked the beginning of the South American independence process. As a result of this revolution, the Royal Audiencia of Cusco was established, and a migration of prominent Spanish families to the cities of Lima and Arequipa ensued, fearing indigenous revolts. These migrations, together with the commercial decline generated by the creation of the Viceroyalty of the Río de la Plata, which took away the city's leading role as a transit point for travelers and merchants, explained the decline that the city suffered in the 19th century.

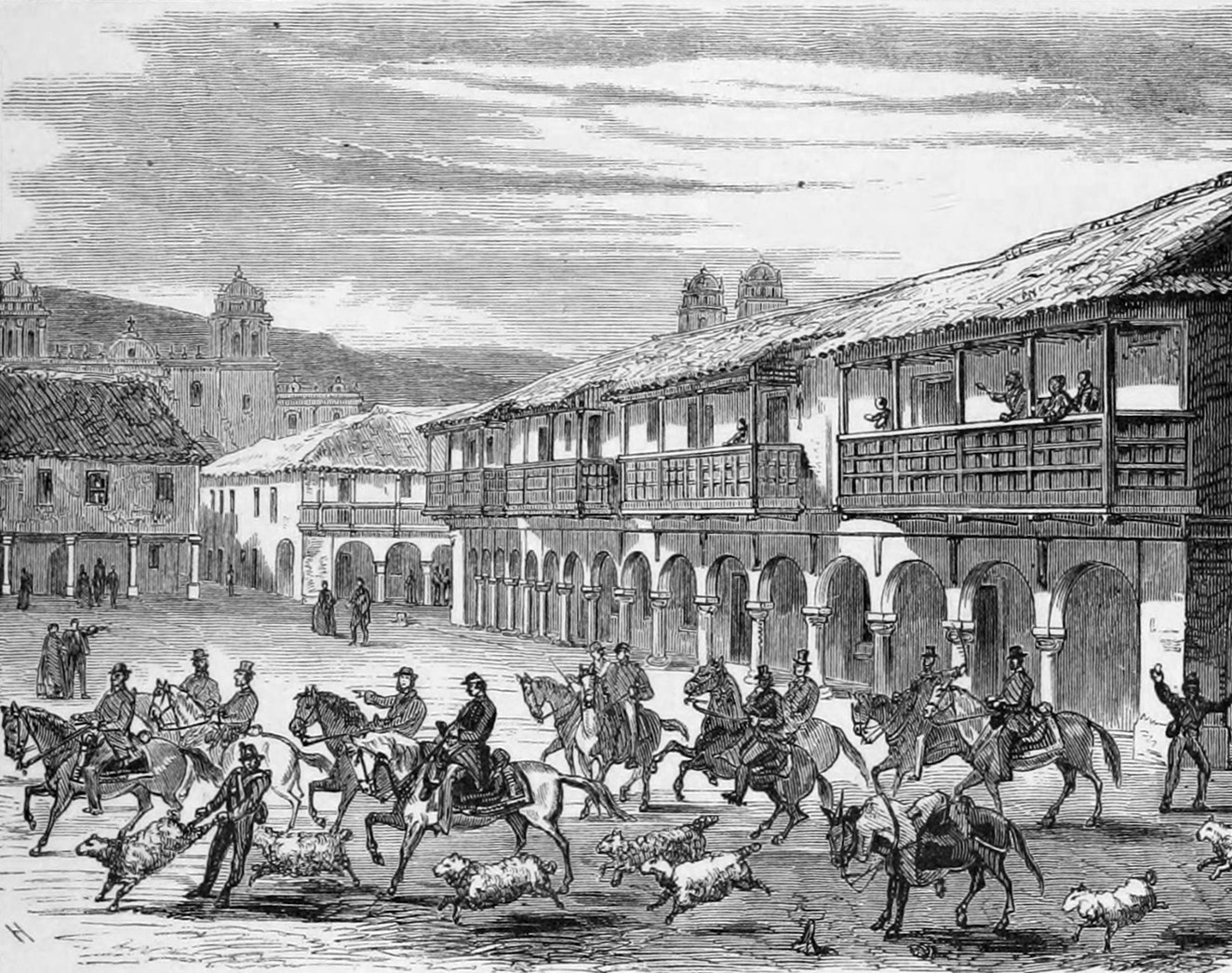
View in the Plaza del Cabildo, Cuzco in 1877 by Ephraim George Squier

In 1814, a new uprising against the viceregal administration occurred. The Cuzco Rebellion, initiated in 1814 by the Angulo brothers and Brigadier Mateo Pumacahua, a mestizo from Cusco who had fought against the forces of Túpac Amaru II, aimed to establish a governing junta in the city to unite the uprising with the process underway in Buenos Aires to achieve Peruvian Independence. It was suppressed by Viceroy Jose de Abascal y Souza in less than a year. Despite this rebellion, Cusco was the last royalist stronghold in Peru, maintaining its loyalty to the King of Spain until 1824, even though independence had been declared in 1821. Cusco became the last colonial capital during the rule of Viceroy José de la Serna, who held that position from this city between 31 December 1821, and December 1824. During this time, the Royal Army was stationed in Cusco, and other institutions such as the Mint and the printing press operated there.

Only after the defeat at the Battle of Ayacucho was known, on 22 December 1824, did the Cusco City Council recognize the capitulation of Ayacucho and accept Agustín Gamarra, a native of Cusco, as the new authority, who would hold the position of prefect. This brought an end to the colonial intendancy. On 25 December 1824, patriot troops entered the city under Gamarra's command, who received political authority from the last governor-intendant, Antonio María Álvarez, and prepared for the arrival of Simón Bolívar, who would reach Cusco in 1825.

=== Republican era ===
A major earthquake on 21 May 1950 damaged more than one third of the city's structures. The Dominican Priory and Church of Santo Domingo, which were built on top of the impressive Qurikancha (Temple of the Sun), were among the affected colonial era buildings. Inca architecture withstood the earthquake. Many of the old Inca walls were at first thought to have been lost after the earthquake, but the granite retaining walls of the Qurikancha were exposed, as well as those of other ancient structures throughout the city. Restoration work at the Santo Domingo complex exposed the Inca masonry formerly obscured by the superstructure without compromising the integrity of the colonial heritage. Many of the buildings damaged in 1950 had been impacted by an earthquake only nine years previously.

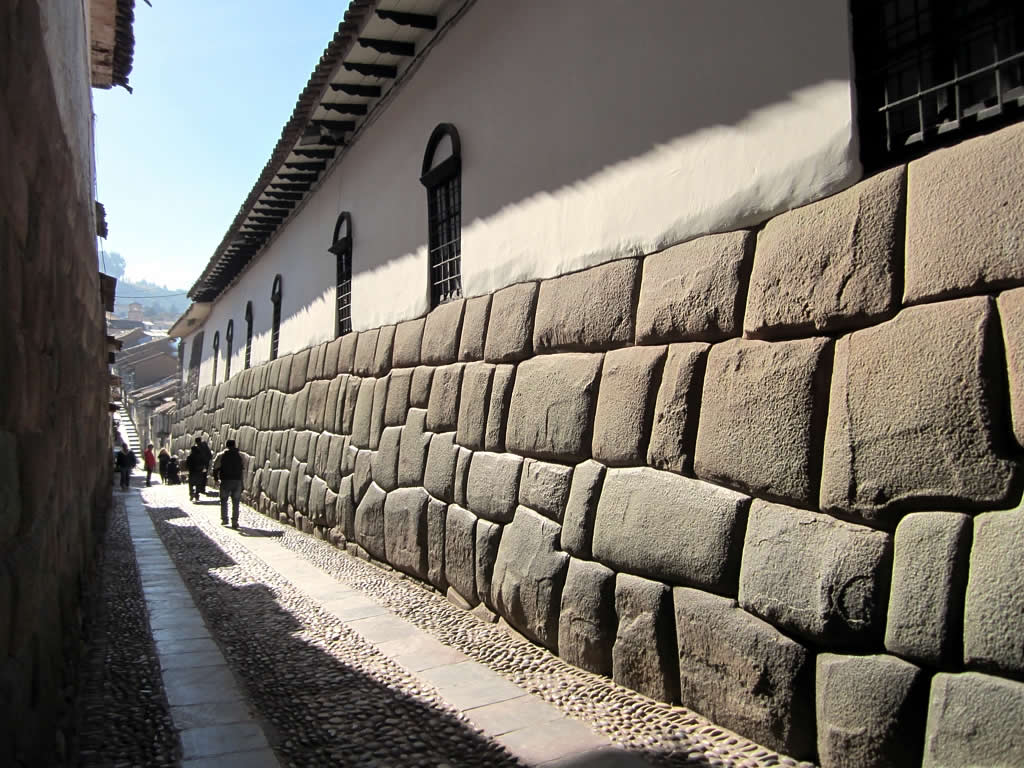
View of Hatun Rumiyuq Street. Many of the colonial constructions used the city's Inca constructions as a base.

In the 1990s, during the mayoral administration of Mayor Daniel Estrada Pérez, the city underwent a new process of beautification through the restoration of monuments and the construction of plazas, fountains and monuments. Likewise, thanks to the efforts of this authority, various recognitions were achieved, such as the declaration as "Historical Capital of Peru" contained in the text of the Political Constitution of Peru of 1993. It was also decided to change the coat of arms of Cusco, leaving aside the colonial coat of arms and adopting the Sol de Echenique as the new coat of arms. Additionally, the change of the official name of the city was proposed to adopt the Quechua word Qosqo, but this change was reversed a few years later.

Currently, Cusco is the most important tourist destination in Peru. Under the administration of mayor Daniel Estrada Pérez, a staunch supporter of the Academia Mayor de la Lengua Quechua, between 1983 and 1995 the Quechua name Qosqo was officially adopted for the city. Tourism in the city was drastically affected by the COVID-19 pandemic in Peru and the 2022–2023 Peruvian protests, with the latter event costing the area 10 million soles daily.

=== Honors ===
- In 1933, the Congress of Americanists met in La Plata, Argentina, and declared the city as the Archeological Capital of the Americas.
- In 1978, the 7th Convention of Mayors of Great World Cities met in Milan, Italy, and declared Cusco a Cultural Heritage of the World.
- In 1983, UNESCO, in Paris, France, declared the city a World Heritage Site. The Peruvian government declared it the Tourism Capital of Peru and Cultural Heritage of the Nation.
- In 2001, in Cusco, the south American Congress of Aldermen and Councillors awarded Cusco the title of Historical Capital of in South America.
- In 2007 the Organización Capital Americana de la Cultura awarded Cusco the title of Cultural Capital of America.
- In 2007, the New7Wonders Foundation designated Machu Picchu one of the New Seven Wonders of the World, following a worldwide poll.
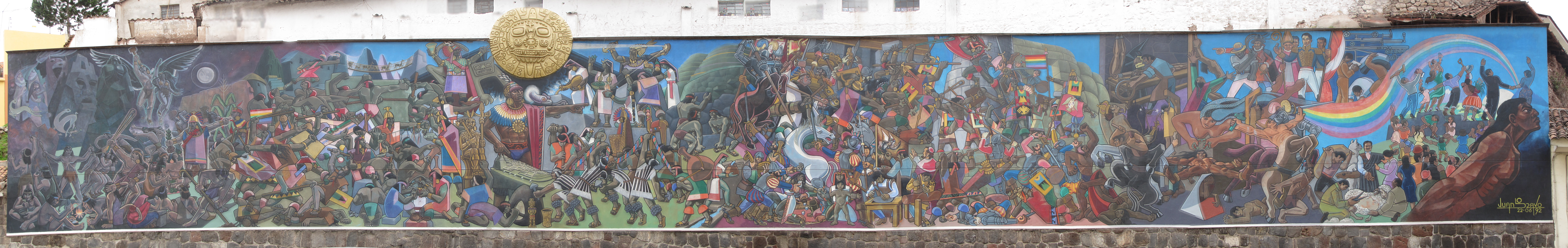
Mural of the History of Cusco by Juan Bravo, on Avenida El Sol near the Qoricancha, depicting 3,000 years of the city's history

== Geography ==
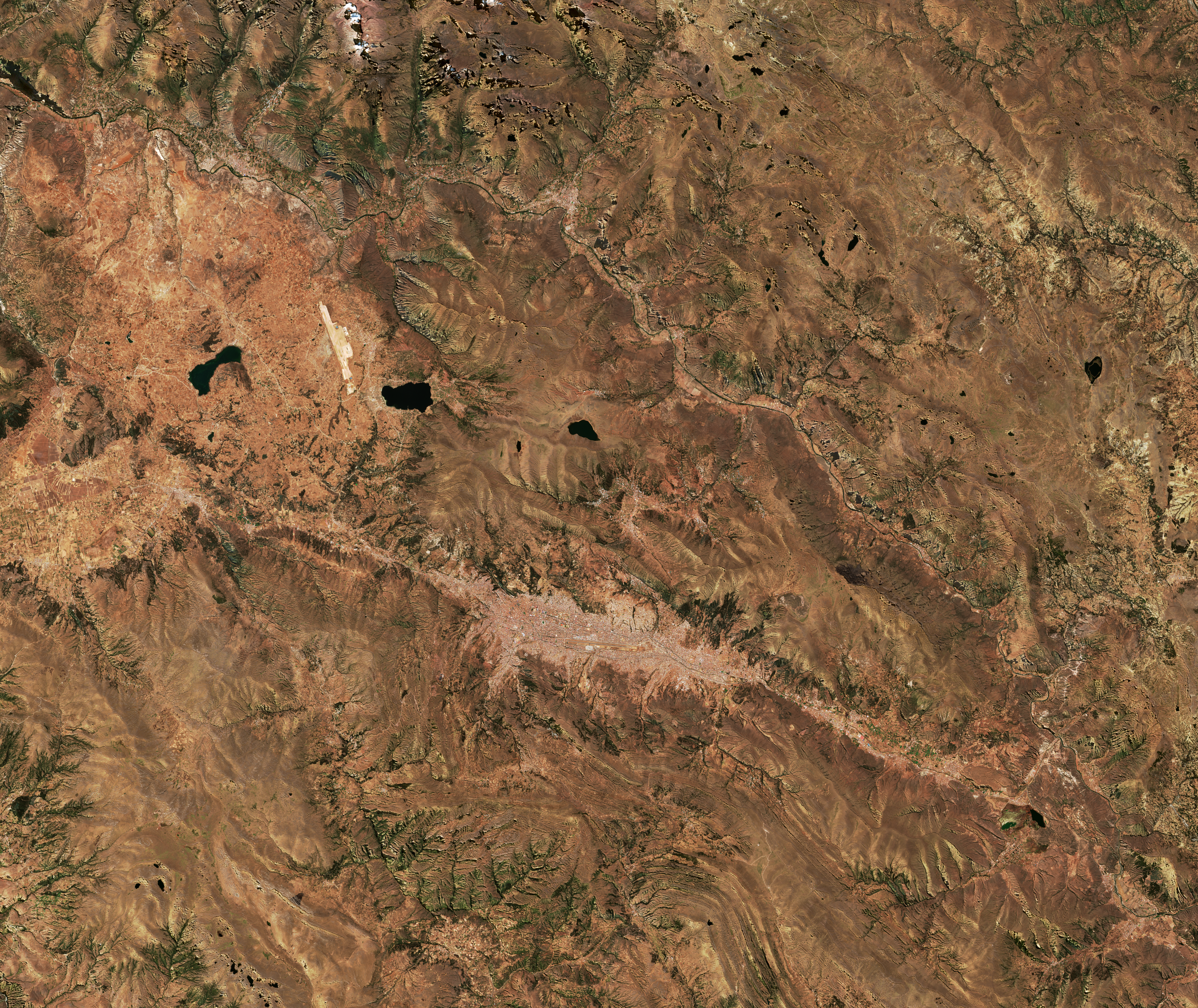
Cusco (center) and the Sacred Valley, following the Urubamba River to the northwest, as seen from Sentinel-2

=== Location ===
Cusco is located in the central Andes Mountains, found in southern Peru. Its elevation is around 3,400 m (11,200 ft). To its north is the Vilcabamba mountain range with 4,000–6,000-meter-high (13,000–20,000-foot) mountains. The highest peak is Salcantay (6,271 meters or 20,574 feet) about 60 kilometers (37 miles) northwest of Cusco.

=== Climate ===
Cusco has a subtropical highland climate (Köppen: Cwb, Trewartha: Cwll). It is generally dry and temperate, with two defined seasons. Winter occurs from April through September, with abundant sunshine and occasional nighttime frosts; July is the coldest month with an average of 9.7 °C (49.5 °F). Summer occurs from October through to March, with warm temperatures and abundant rainfall; November is the warmest month, averaging 13.3 °C (55.9 °F). Although frost and hail are common, the last reported snowfalls were in June 1911 and July 1968. Temperatures usually range from 0.2 to 20.9 °C (32.4 to 69.6 °F), but the all-time extreme temperature range is between −8.9 and 30 °C (16.0 and 86.0 °F). Sunshine hours peak in July, the equivalent of January in the Northern Hemisphere. In contrast, February, the equivalent of August in the Northern Hemisphere, has the least sunshine.

In 2006, Cusco was found to have the highest average ultraviolet light levels of any populated location on Earth.

Climate data for Cusco (Alejandro Velasco Astete International Airport), elevation 3,249 m (10,659 ft), (1991–1920 normals, extremes 1931–present)
Month	Jan	Feb	Mar	Apr	May	Jun	Jul	Aug	Sep	Oct	Nov	Dec	Year
Record high °C (°F)	27.8 (82.0)	26.7 (80.1)	25.3 (77.5)	26.9 (80.4)	27.0 (80.6)	24.2 (75.6)	24.2 (75.6)	25.8 (78.4)	25.9 (78.6)	27.2 (81.0)	26.6 (79.9)	29.9 (85.8)	29.9 (85.8)
Mean daily maximum °C (°F)	20.5 (68.9)	20.3 (68.5)	20.5 (68.9)	21.0 (69.8)	21.2 (70.2)	20.8 (69.4)	20.6 (69.1)	21.5 (70.7)	21.7 (71.1)	21.9 (71.4)	22.3 (72.1)	21.1 (70.0)	21.1 (70.0)
Daily mean °C (°F)	14.3 (57.7)	14.3 (57.7)	14.3 (57.7)	13.7 (56.7)	12.5 (54.5)	11.4 (52.5)	10.9 (51.6)	12.3 (54.1)	13.5 (56.3)	14.5 (58.1)	15.1 (59.2)	14.5 (58.1)	13.4 (56.2)
Mean daily minimum °C (°F)	8.0 (46.4)	8.0 (46.4)	7.8 (46.0)	6.2 (43.2)	3.6 (38.5)	1.9 (35.4)	1.2 (34.2)	2.8 (37.0)	5.0 (41.0)	6.8 (44.2)	7.6 (45.7)	7.8 (46.0)	5.6 (42.0)
Record low °C (°F)	0.0 (32.0)	0.0 (32.0)	0.0 (32.0)	−2.0 (28.4)	−7.0 (19.4)	−4.5 (23.9)	−7.0 (19.4)	−6.0 (21.2)	−6.0 (21.2)	0.0 (32.0)	0.0 (32.0)	0.5 (32.9)	−7.0 (19.4)
Average precipitation mm (inches)	153.4 (6.04)	132.1 (5.20)	105.9 (4.17)	38.4 (1.51)	7.1 (0.28)	3.3 (0.13)	5.9 (0.23)	6.6 (0.26)	18.0 (0.71)	54.5 (2.15)	77.3 (3.04)	125.2 (4.93)	727.7 (28.65)
Average precipitation days (≥ 1.0 mm)	19.6	17.2	15.6	7.3	2.2	1.0	1.2	1.9	3.9	9.3	9.8	17.1	106.1
Average relative humidity (%)	66	67	66	63	59	55	54	54	56	56	58	62	60
Average ultraviolet index	22	20	18	16	15	12	13	14	17	19	21	25	18
Source 1: NOAA, Meteo Climat
Source 2: Deutscher Wetterdienst (humidity 1954–1993) Danish Meteorological Institute (sun 1931–1960)

== Government ==
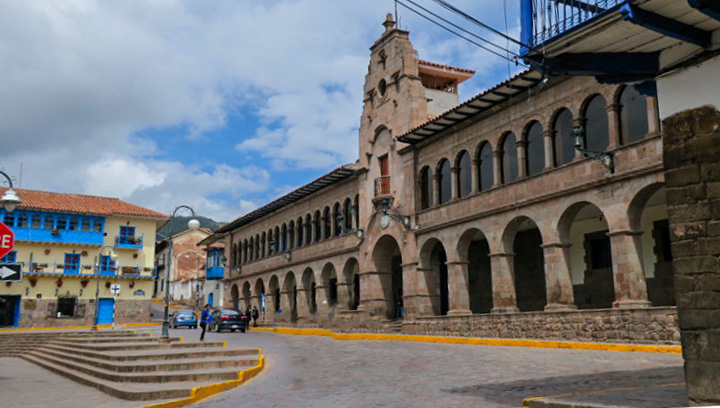
The Palacio del Cabildo, now housing Cusco City Hall and a museum.

During the Inca period, Cusco was the main political center of the region from which the Inca Empire was ruled and where the political and religious elite lived. After its Spanish foundation, it lost prominence due to Francisco Pizarro's decision to establish the capital of the new territories in the city of Lima because it had close access to the sea and communication with the metropolis. However, Cusco continued to be an important city within the viceregal political scheme to the point of being the first city in the entire Viceroyalty to have a bishop. Its participation in the trade routes during the viceroyalty guaranteed its political importance, as it remained the capital of the corregimiento established in these territories and, later, of the Intendancy of Cusco and, towards the end of the viceroyalty, of the Royal Audience of Cusco.

During the republic, Cusco's political role languished due to its isolation from the capital, coastline, and trade routes of the 19th and 20th centuries. However, it maintained its status as the main city in southern Peru, although subordinated to the importance that Arequipa was gaining, better connected with the rest of the country. Cusco has always remained the capital of the department of Cusco.

Politically, according to the results of elections held in the second half of the 20th century, Cusco has been a stronghold of leftist parties in Peru. In the 1970s and 1980s, the socialist leader Daniel Estrada Pérez brought together this political tendency under the banner of the United Left alliance. Since his death, Cusco has been a major city for parties such as the Peruvian Nationalist Party and the Broad Front for Justice, Life and Liberty, as well as regional movements. Traditional Peruvian parties, such as the Peruvian Aprista Party and Acción Popular, have recorded eventual electoral victories, while those that represent a right-wing political position, such as the Popular Christian Party and Fujimorism itself, have had little presence among the elected authorities.

== Demographics ==
The population reached 47,000 inhabitants in the 1840s. The city had a population of about 348,935 people in 2007 and 428,450 people in 2017 according to INEI.

Ethnicities of Cusco in 2017
Ethnicities	Percentage
Quechua	63.0%
Mestizo	31.0%
White	1.9%
Other indigenous groups	1.0%
Other	0.8%
No answer	2.3%

City district	Area (km^{2})	Population 2017 census (hab)	Housing (2007)	Density (hab/km^{2})	Elevation (amsl)
Cuzco	116.22	114,630*	28,476	936.1	3,399
San Jerónimo	103.34	57,075*	8,942	279.2	3,244
San Sebastián	89.44	112,536*	18,109	955.6	3,244
Santiago	69.72	94,756*	21,168	950.6	3,400
Wanchaq	6.38	58,541*	14,690	8,546.1	3,366
Total	385.1	437,538*	91,385	929.76	—
*Census data conducted by INEI

== Economy ==
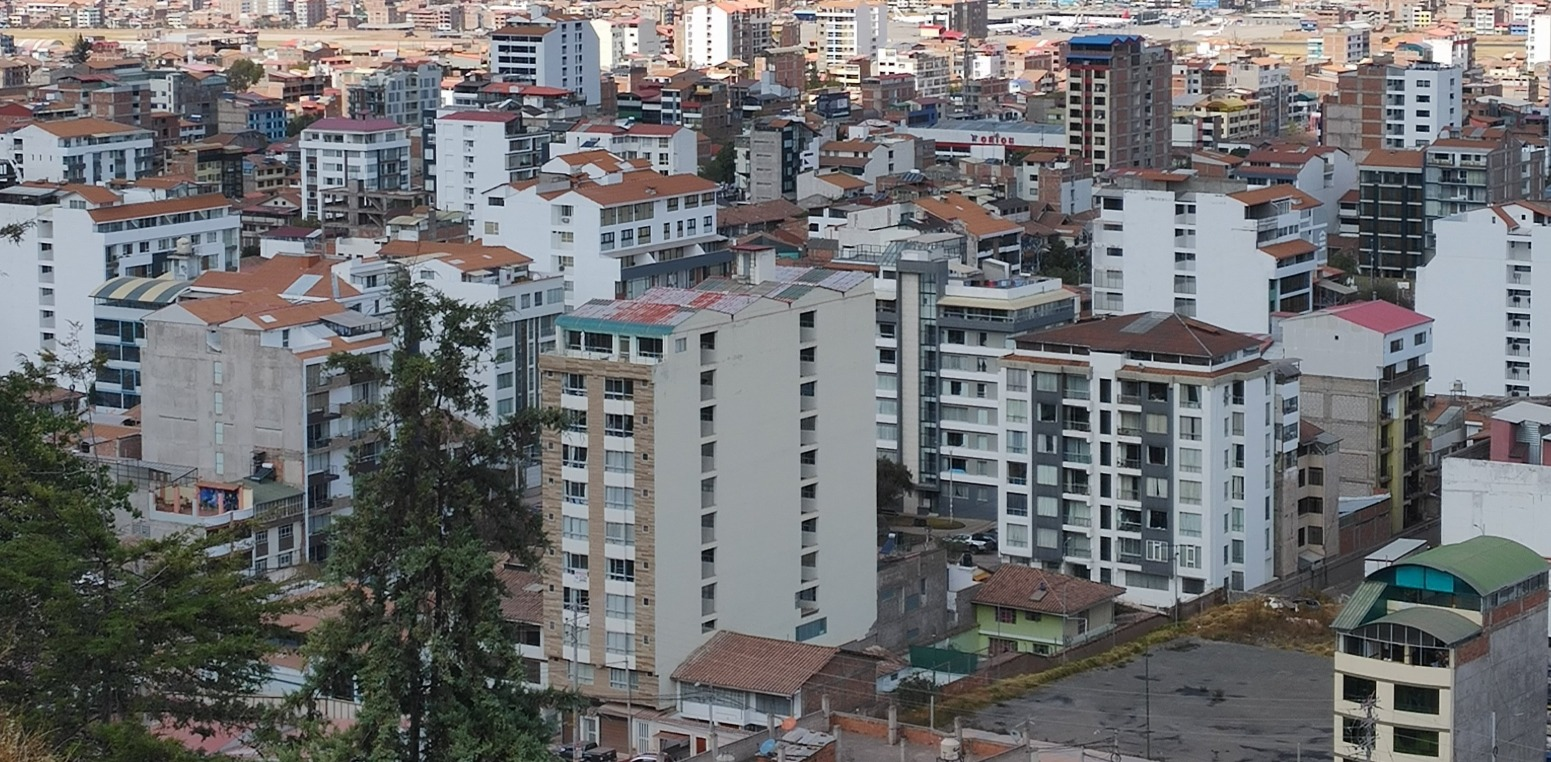
Magisterio urban area

Economic activity in Cusco includes agriculture, especially maize and native tubers. The local industry is related to extractive activities and to food and beverage products, such as beer, carbonated waters, coffee, chocolates, among others. However, the relevant economic activity of its inhabitants is the reception of tourism, with increasingly better infrastructure and services. It is the second city in this country that has and maintains full employment. The city has recently grown in the industrial sector.

=== Tourism ===
Tourism has been important to the Cusco economy since the early 2000s, bringing in more than 1.2 million tourists per year. In 2019, Cusco was the region that reached the highest number of tourists in Peru with more than 2.7 million tourists. In 2002, the income Cusco received from tourism was US$837 million. In 2009, that number increased to US$2.47 billion. Most tourists visiting the city are there to tour the city and the Incan Ruins, especially the top destination, Machu Picchu, which is one of the New Seven Modern Wonders of the World.

== Culture ==
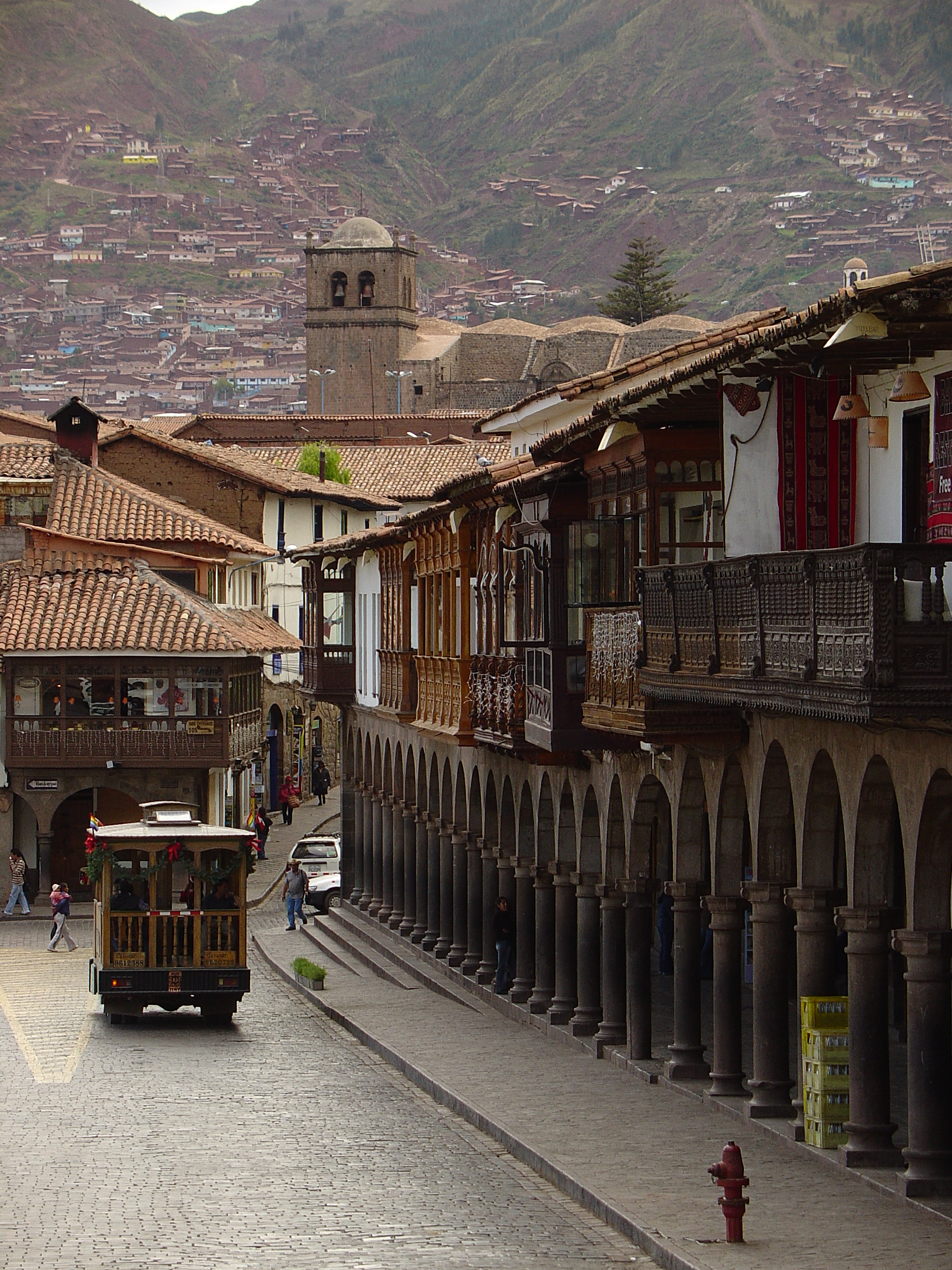
A view of the Colonial Balconies of Cusco

=== Architecture ===
Due to its antiquity and significance, the center of the city preserves many buildings, squares and streets from pre-Columbian times as well as colonial constructions. That is why the city was declared in 1972 as Cultural Heritage of the Nation by Supreme Resolution No. 2900-72-ED. In 1983, during the VII session of the UNESCO World Heritage Committee, it was decided to declare this area as a World Heritage Site by establishing a central zone that constitutes the World Heritage Site proper and a buffer zone.

One of the characteristics that the Incas achieved with their urban plan in Cusco was the respect for the geographical matrix when building their fabric, since they responded with different design strategies to the rugged topography of the Andean area at 3,399 meters above sea level.

The streets and the entire urban layout followed an order that responded to the orientation of the sun. These concepts, combined with the integration of nature, the prevention of the destruction of natural objects, and an urban structure subordinated to the topography of the land, identified the way of making cities in the Inca Empire with the intention of taking over a place and adapting it to their design.

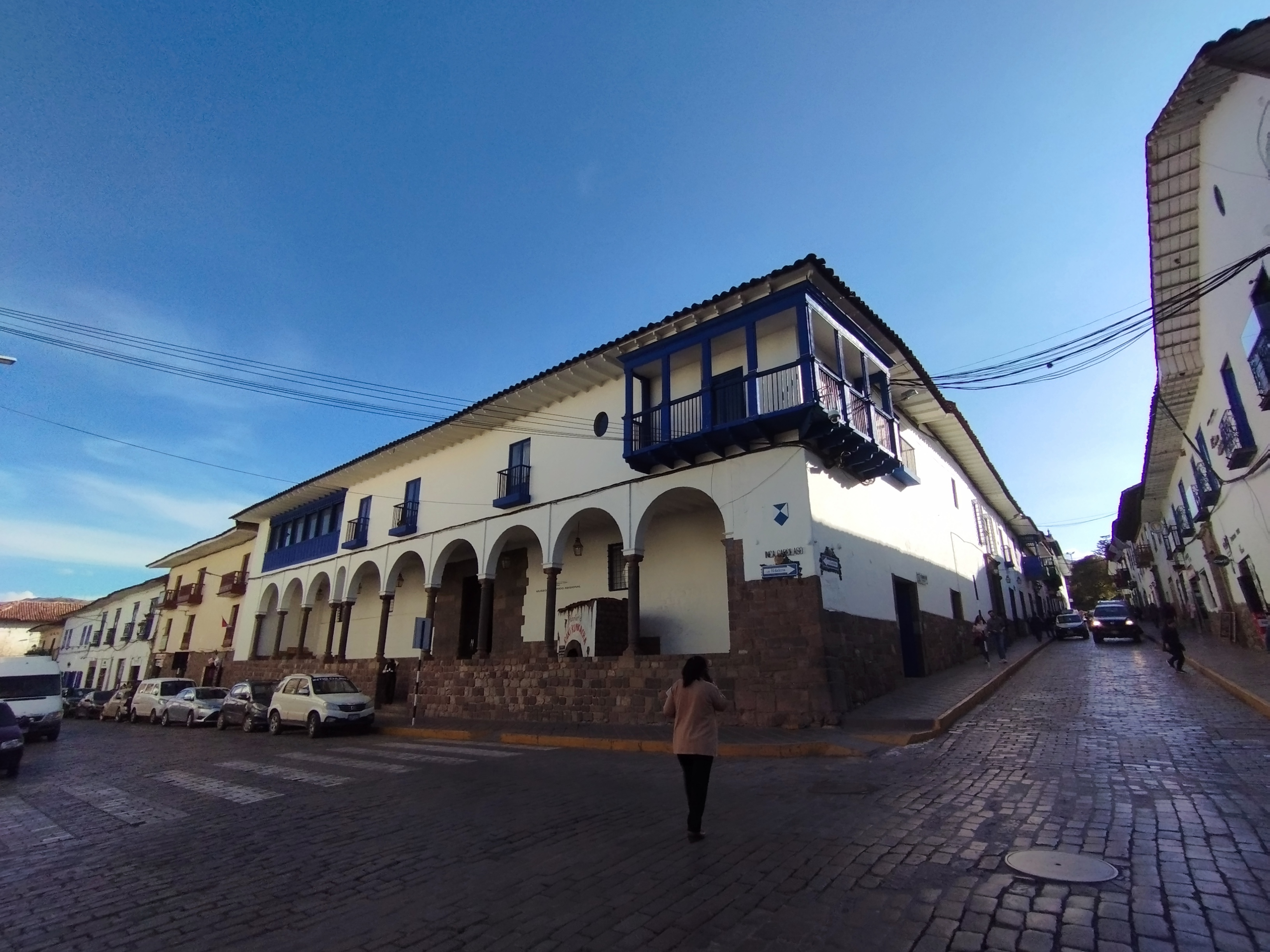
Regional Historical Museum of Cusco Casa del Inka Garcilaso de La Vega

=== Museums ===
Cusco has the following important museums: Pre-Columbian Art Museum, Machu Picchu Museum, Inka Museum, Regional Historical Museum of Cusco, and the Center of the Traditional Textiles of Cusco

There are also some museums located at churches, like the Museum and Convent of San Francisco and the Museum of Qoricancha Temple.

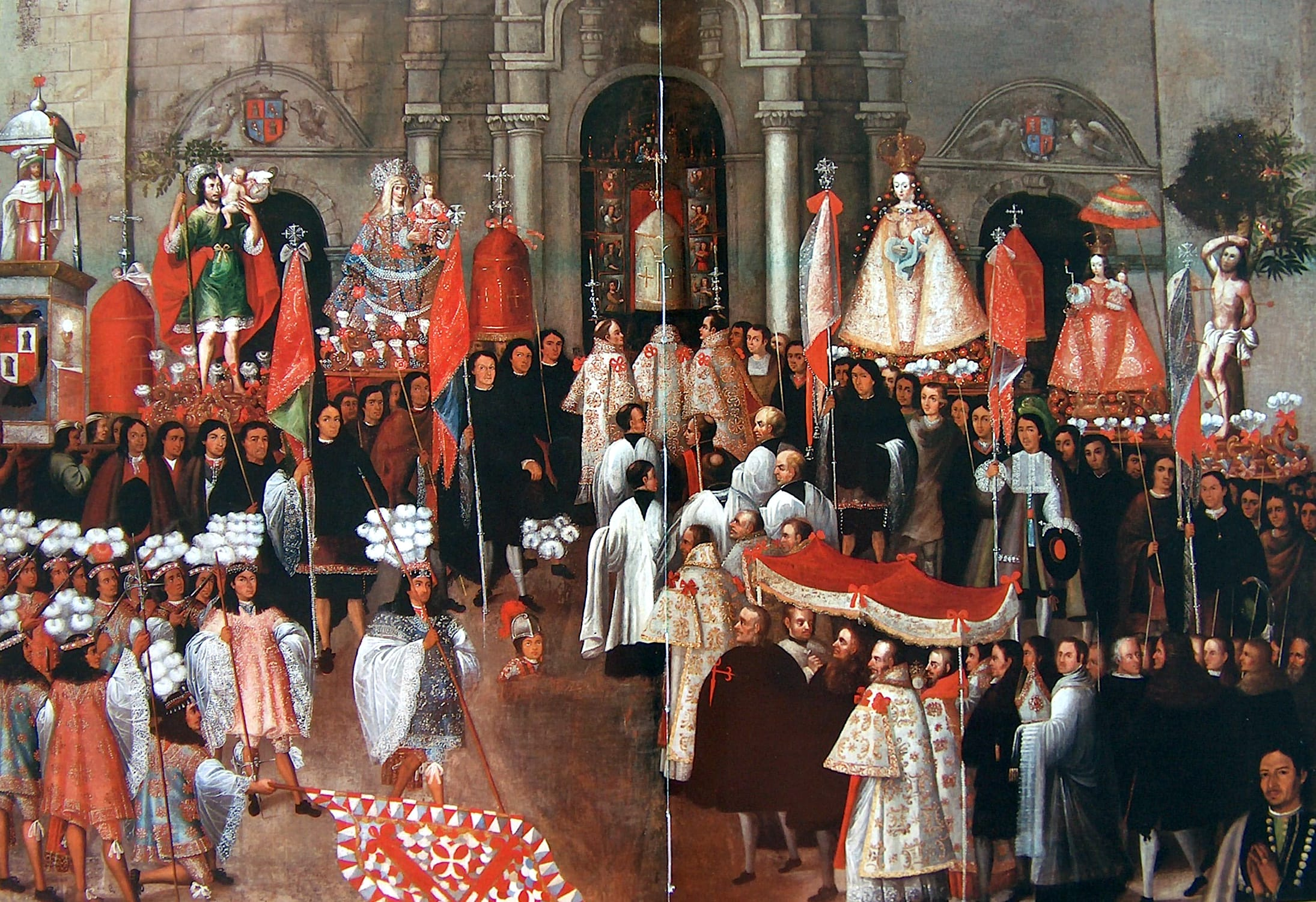
Mercedarian Friars in the Corpus Christi procession at the Main Square of Cusco. 17th century. Cusco Colonial Painting School. Painting currently located at the Archbishop's Palace of Cusco.

=== Religion ===
The most common practiced religion in Cusco is Catholicism. The Inca religion is also practiced by the Quechua people. Cusco hosts the great mass ceremonies and imperial festivities, such as the Inti Raymi or Festival of the Sun, which continues to take place during the winter solstice – the solar new year – which is celebrated every 24 June on the esplanade of Sacsayhuamán.

Currently, the majority of the population belongs to the Catholic Church, with Cuzco being the archbishopric. The largest and oldest cathedral is the Cusco Cathedral. It is home to the Roman Catholic Archdiocese of Cusco.

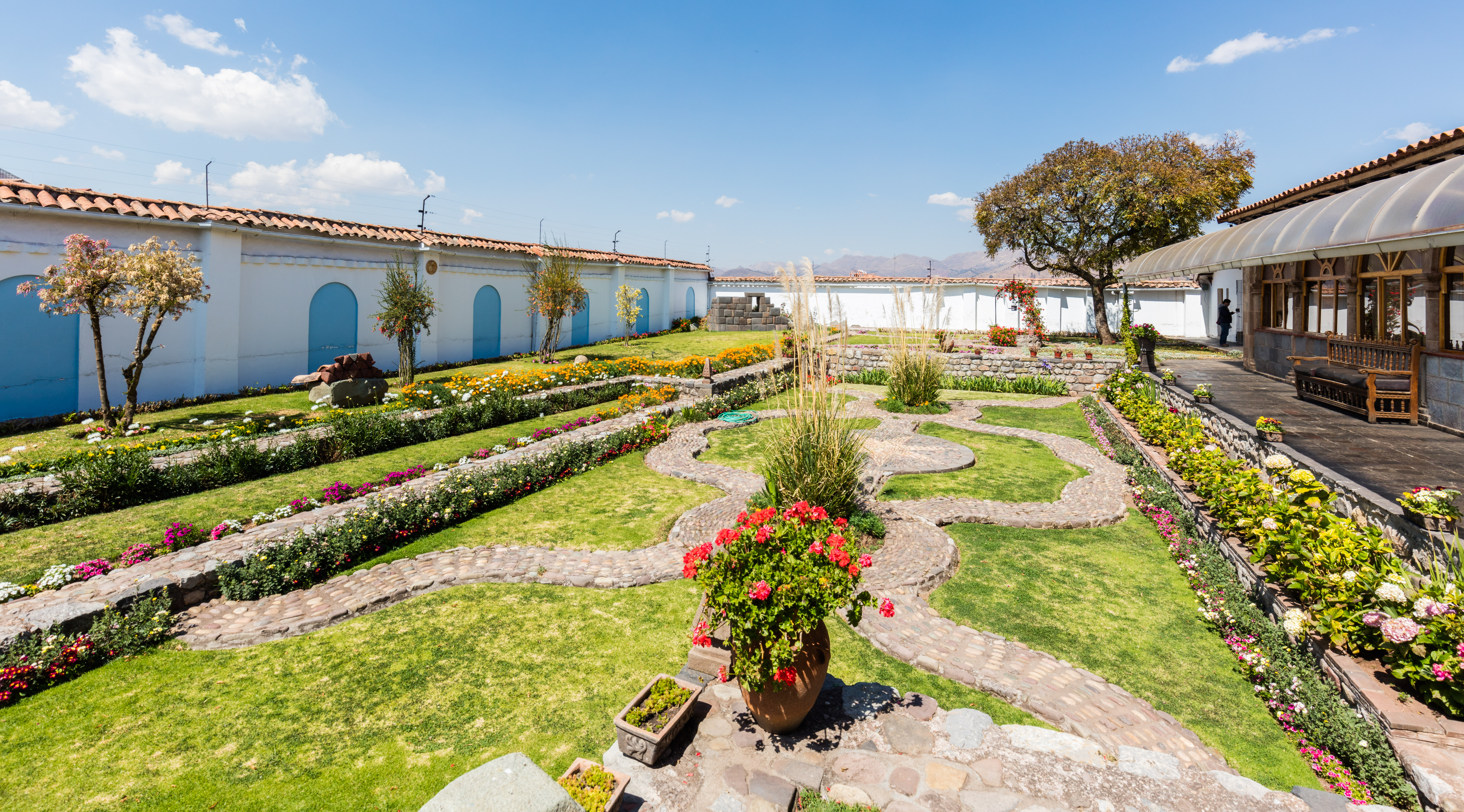
Museum of Religious Art of Arzobispado

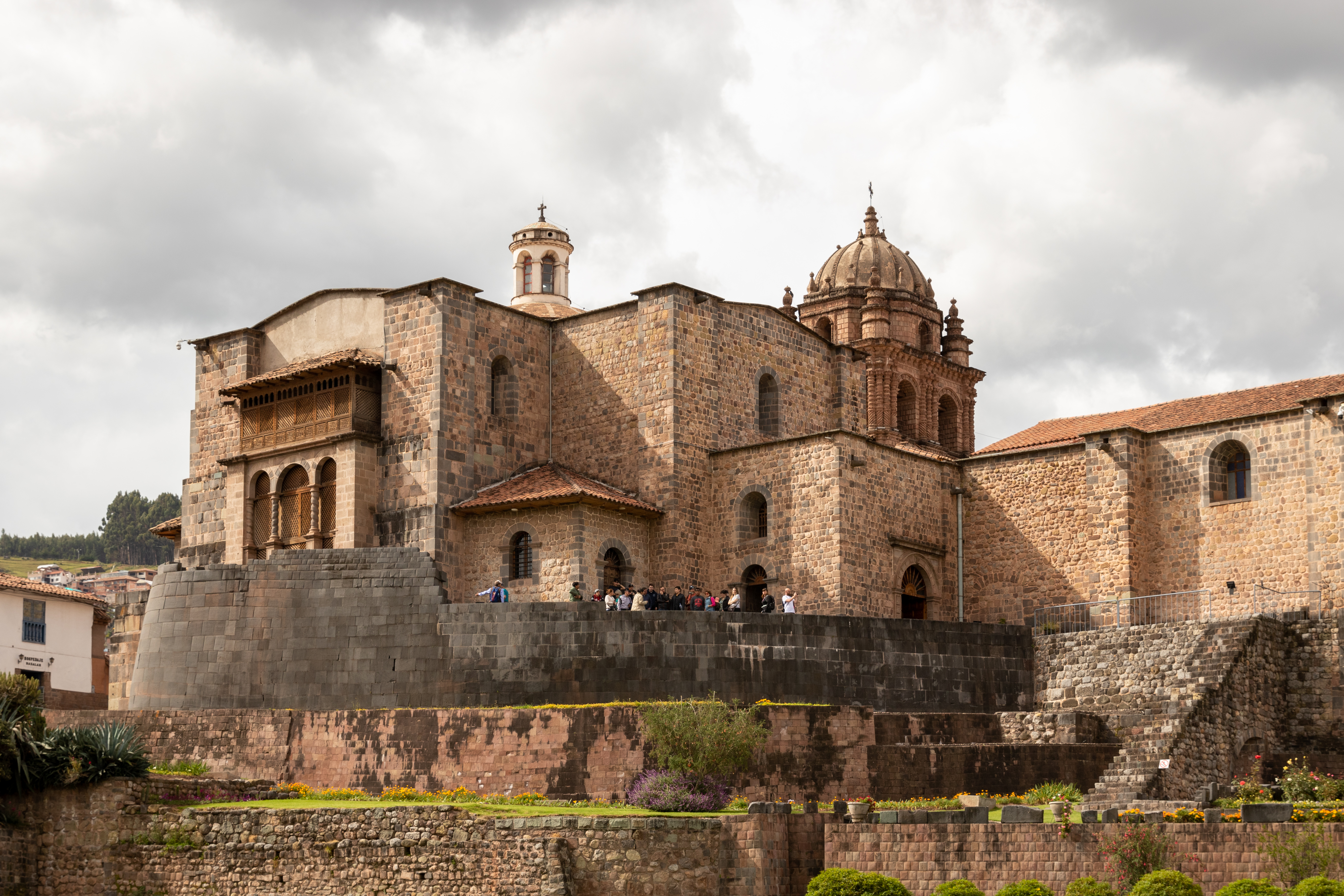
The Convent of Santo Domingo, built on the Coricancha temple.

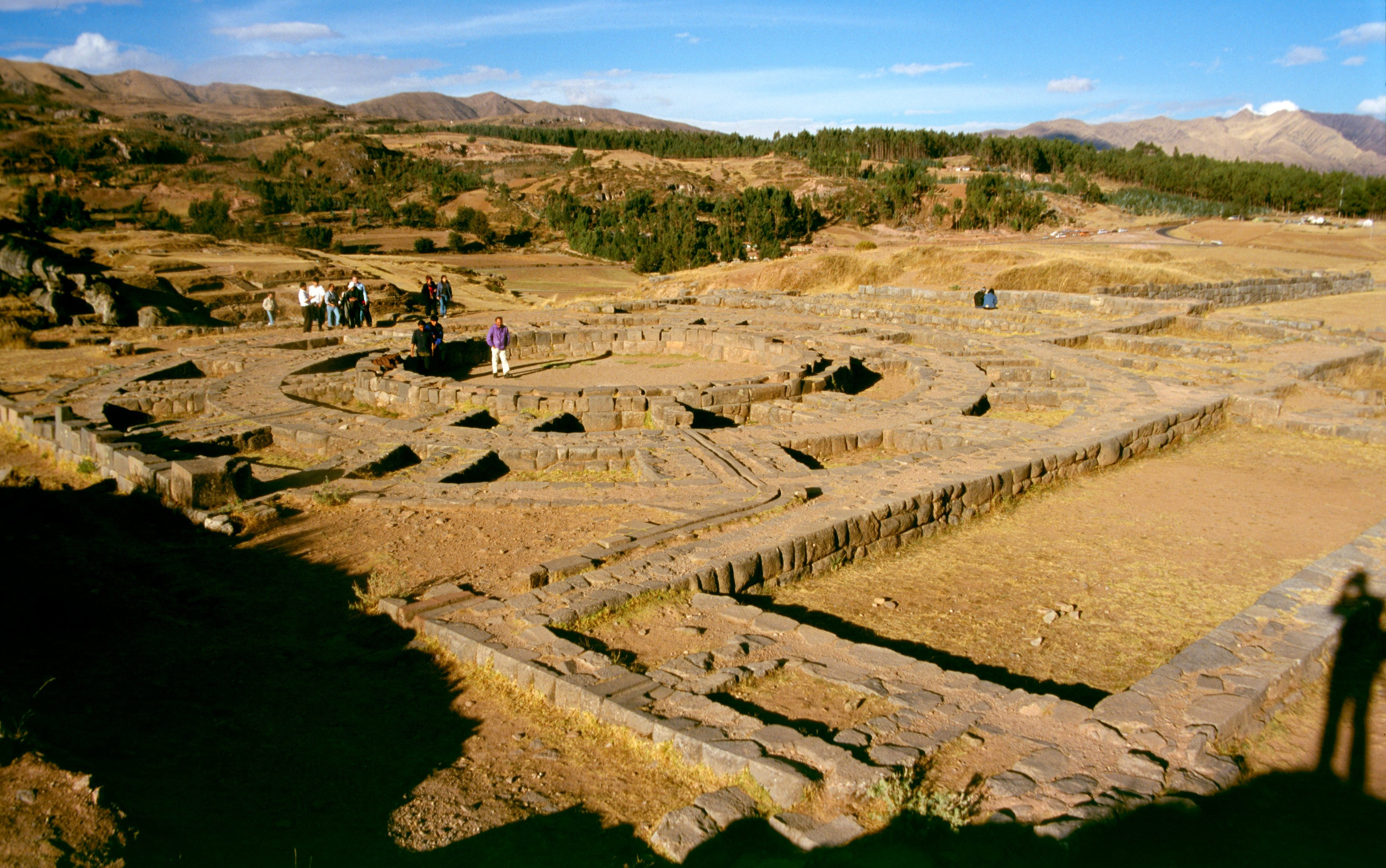
Sacsayhuamán Esplanade, where the Inti Raymi festival takes place.

=== Cuisine ===
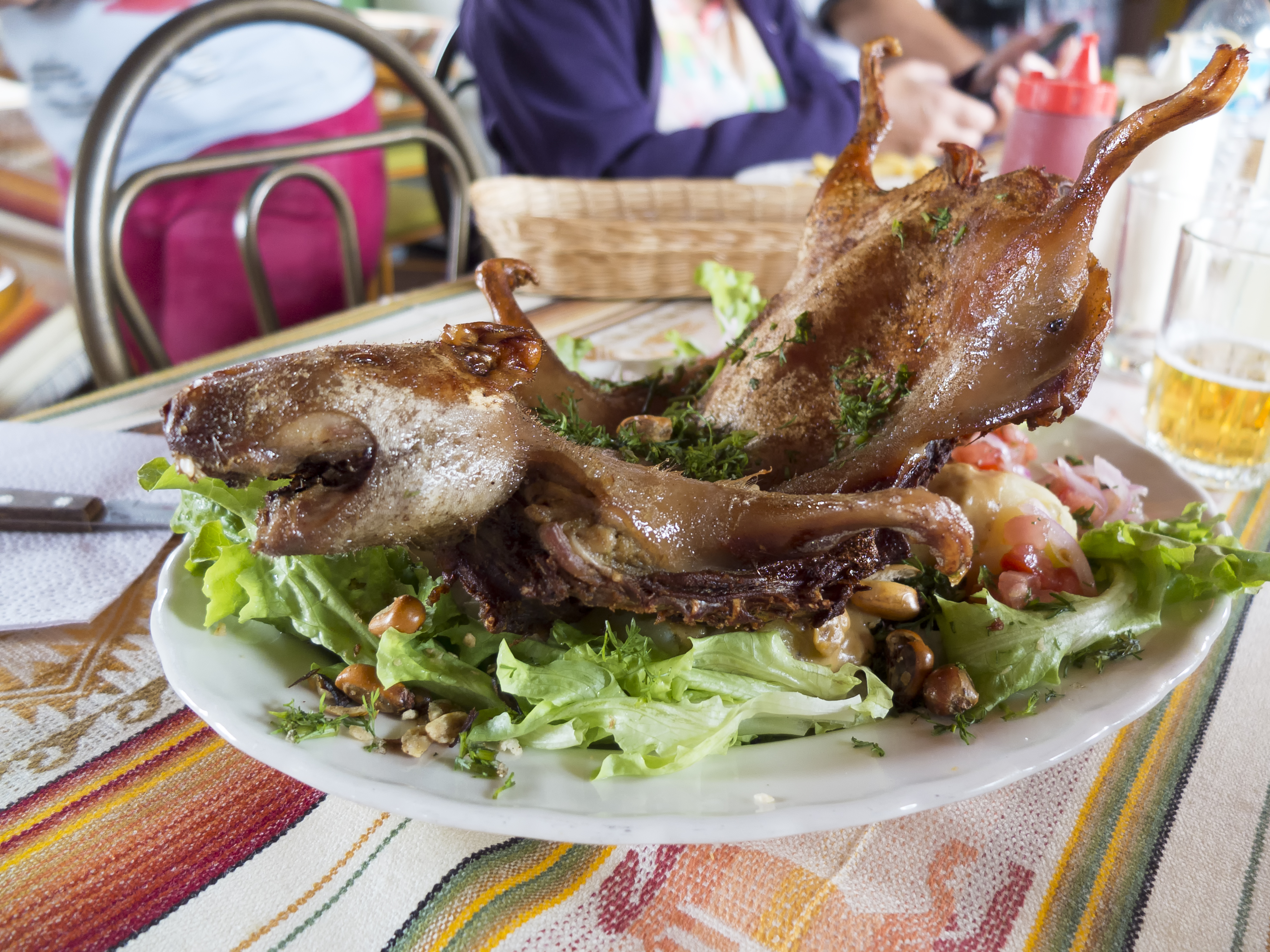
Cuy (Guinea Pig)

As capital to the Inca Empire, Cusco was an important agricultural region. It was a natural reserve for thousands of native Peruvian species, including around 3,000 varieties of potato cultivated by the people. Fusion and neo-Andean restaurants developed in Cusco, in which the cuisine is prepared with modern techniques and incorporates a blend of traditional Andean and international ingredients. Cuy (guinea pig), a native animal in Cusco, is a popular dish in the city.

The local gastronomy presents a diversified array of dishes resulting from the mestizaje and fusion of its pre-Inca, Inca, colonial, and modern traditions. It is a variation of Andean Peruvian cuisine, although it maintains some typical cultural traits of southern Peru. Although the list of typical dishes may vary among individuals, Tapia and García present a list of foods and beverages usually found in a Cusco picantería:

Other dishes include chairo, adobo, rocoto relleno, kapchi, lawas or creams made with corn or chuño, and Timpu, a dish originating from Cusco served during Carnival.

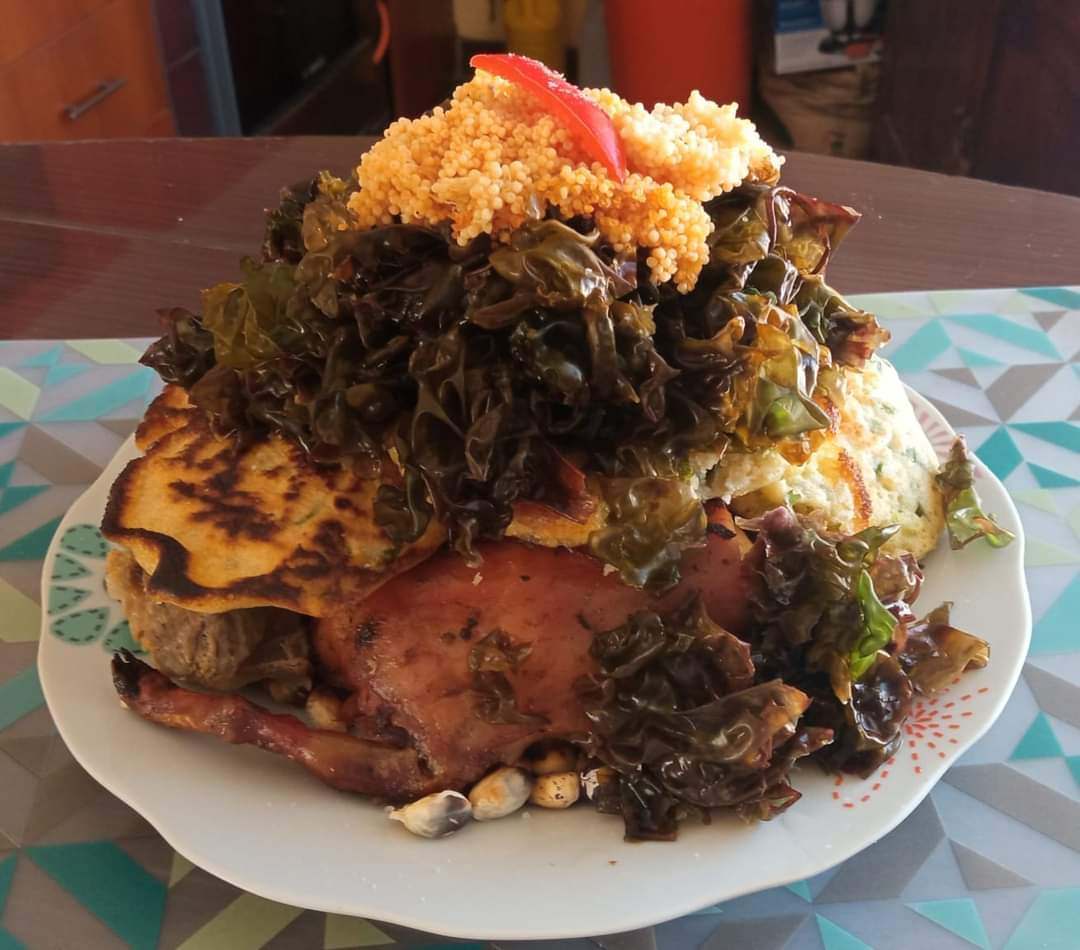
Plate of Chiri Uchu

Chiri Uchu is a typical dish of the locality not offered in picanterías, as it is consumed in June during the Cusco festivities of Inti Raymi and, primarily, during the Corpus Christi. It is considered one of the most authentic gastronomic expressions of Cusco as it blends both native flavors of the Andes and those brought by the Spanish conquistadors. It is a cold dish that includes various meats (cuy, boiled chicken, charqui, morcilla (blood sausage), salchicha (sausage)), potatoes, cheese, corn cake, fish roe, and lake algae.

=== Music ===
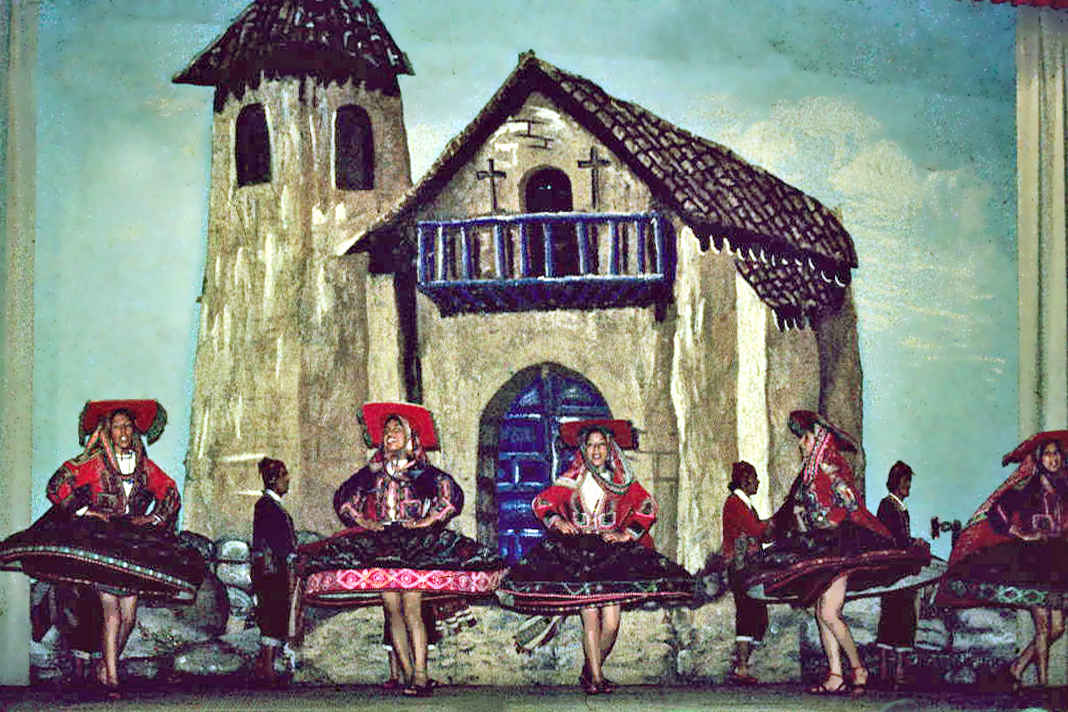
Performance in 1981 at the Centro Qosqo de Arte Nativo

Centro Qosqo de Arte Nativo A folkloric institution established in 1924. It is considered the most important folkloric institution in the city and was recognized by the Peruvian government as the first folkloric institution in the country and by the regional government as a Living Cultural Heritage of the Cusco region.

The Cusco Symphony Orchestra is a permanent artistic group of the Decentralized Directorate of Culture of the Cusco Regional Government, created by Directoral Resolution No. 021/INC-Cusco on 10 March 2009. It performs more than 50 concerts a year and uses the Cusco Municipal Theater.

=== Sport ===
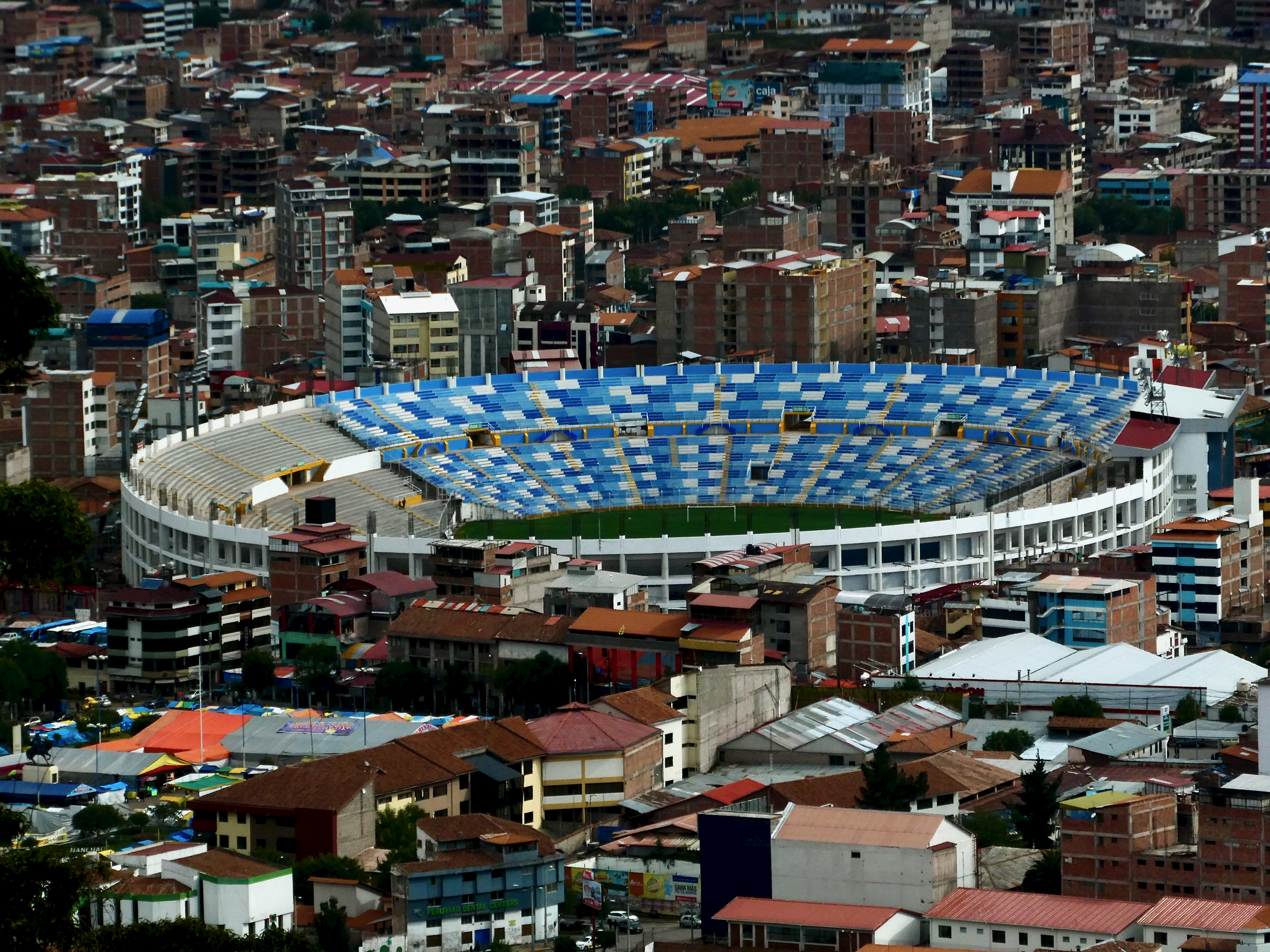
Inca Garcilaso de la Vega Stadium

The most popular sport in the city is football (soccer), with three main clubs. Cienciano participates in the Liga 1 (First Division) and is the only Peruvian club to win an international tournament, winning the 2003 Copa Sudamericana and 2004 Recopa Sudamericana.

Another historic team is Deportivo Garcilaso, which was promoted to Liga 1 after winning the Copa Perú 2022. There is also Cusco Football Club, formerly known as Real Garcilaso, which played in the First Division from 2012 to 2021 after winning the Copa Perú in 2011. In 2022, it was promoted again to Liga 1 after winning the Second Division of Peru. Among other events, the Cusco was a venue for the 2004 Copa América, hosting the third-place match between the Colombia and Uruguay national teams.

=== Cinema ===
The International Short Film Festival (FENACO) was an important international film festival in southern Peru, held every November since 2004 in the imperial city of Cusco. Originally, it was a national event dedicated to the short film format (up to 30 minutes in length), with international showcases, hence its name FENACO (Festival Internacional de Cortometrajes), a name popularized in Peru and worldwide to recognize the festival. However, due to the reception and response from filmmakers, producers, and distributors from different countries, it evolved into an international festival, reaching 354 short films in competition from 37 countries in its sixth edition.

== Media ==
In the city of Cusco, the media is essential for addressing local issues, educating the public, and conserving cultural heritage. Media outlets in the city that serve both Spanish-speaking and Quechua-speaking communities include newspapers, radio, television, and digital platforms. Local news, culture, tourism, and indigenous rights are the main topics of media outlets in Cusco, a historic and popular tourist destination.

Regional coverage is provided by newspapers like Diario del Cusco and Diario El Sol del Cusco (El Sol), while national publications like El Comercio and La República also cover social, political, and economic issues in Cusco. Indigenous communities are largely reached by Quechua-language media, like Cronicawan, which guarantees greater access to news and cultural preservation.

With stations like Radio Tawantinsuyo and Radio Universal transmitting talk shows, music, and news, radio is still a dominant medium. Regional news can be found on local television channels, and Cusqueños are increasingly using digital platforms, such as social media and online news portals.

=== Newspapers ===
- El Diario del Cusco
- El Comercio
- La República
- El Peruano
- Peruvian Times
- El Bocón
- El Popular
- Diario el Sol del Cusco (El Sol)
- Cronicawan

== Main sites ==
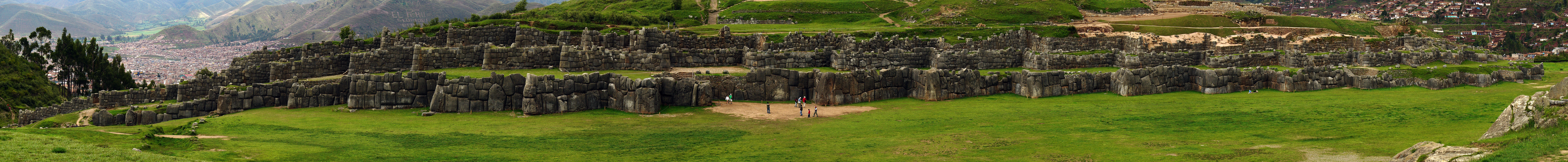
Ruins of Sacsayhuamán

The indigenous Killke culture built the walled complex of Sacsayhuamán about 1100. The Killke built a major temple near Saksaywaman, as well as an aqueduct (Pukyus) and roadway connecting prehistoric structures. Sacsayhuamán was expanded by the Inca.

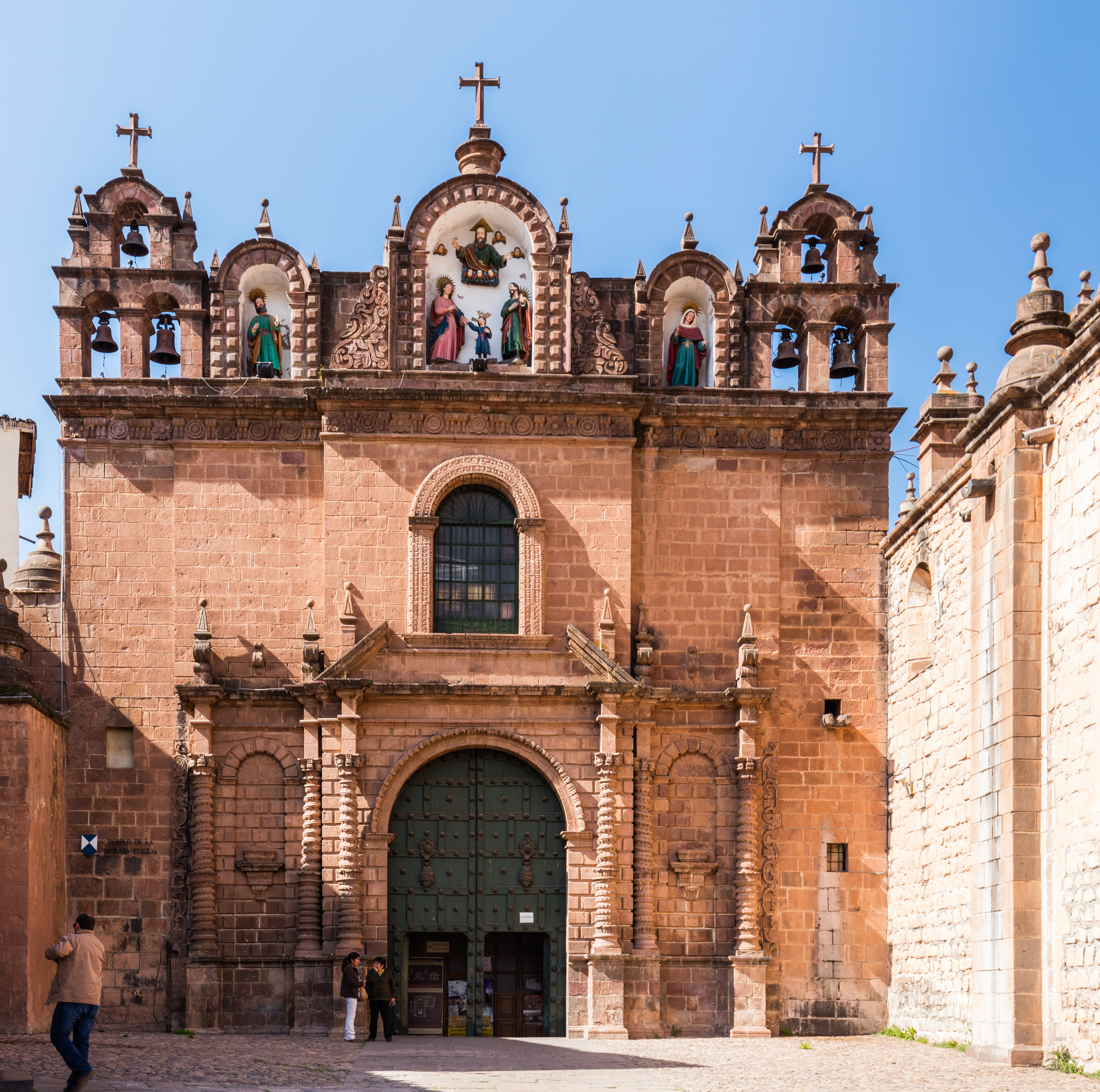
Templo de la Sagrada Familia

The Spanish explorer Pizarro sacked much of the Inca city in 1535. Remains of the palace of the Incas, Qurikancha (the Temple of the Sun), and the Temple of the Virgins of the Sun still stand. Inca buildings and foundations in some cases proved to be stronger during earthquakes than foundations built in present-day Peru. Among the most noteworthy Spanish colonial buildings of the city is the Cathedral of Santo Domingo.

The major nearby Inca sites are Pachacuti's presumed winter home, Machu Picchu, which can be reached on foot by the Inca Trail to Machu Picchu or by train; and the "fortress" at Ollantaytambo.

Less-visited ruins include: Incahuasi, the highest of all Inca sites at 3,980 m (13,060 ft); Vilcabamba, the capital of the Inca after the Spanish capture of Cusco; the sculpture garden at Ñusta Hisp'ana (aka Chuqip'allta, Yuraq Rumi); Tipón, with working water channels in wide terraces; as well as Willkaraqay, Patallaqta, Chuqik'iraw, Moray, Vitcos and many others.

The surrounding area, located in the Watanay Valley, is strong in gold mining and agriculture, including corn, barley, quinoa, tea and coffee.

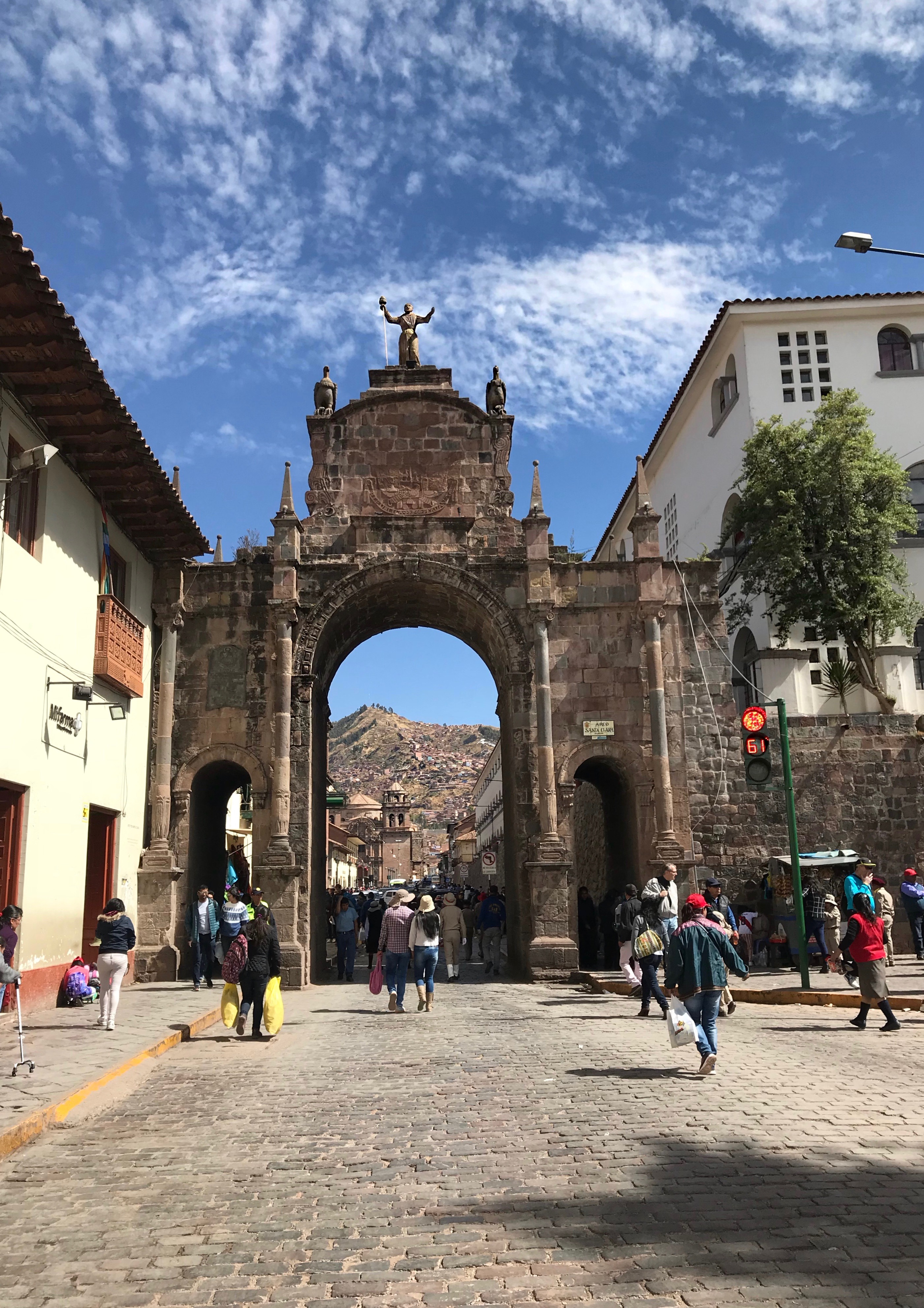
Arco de Santa Clara

=== Architectural heritage ===
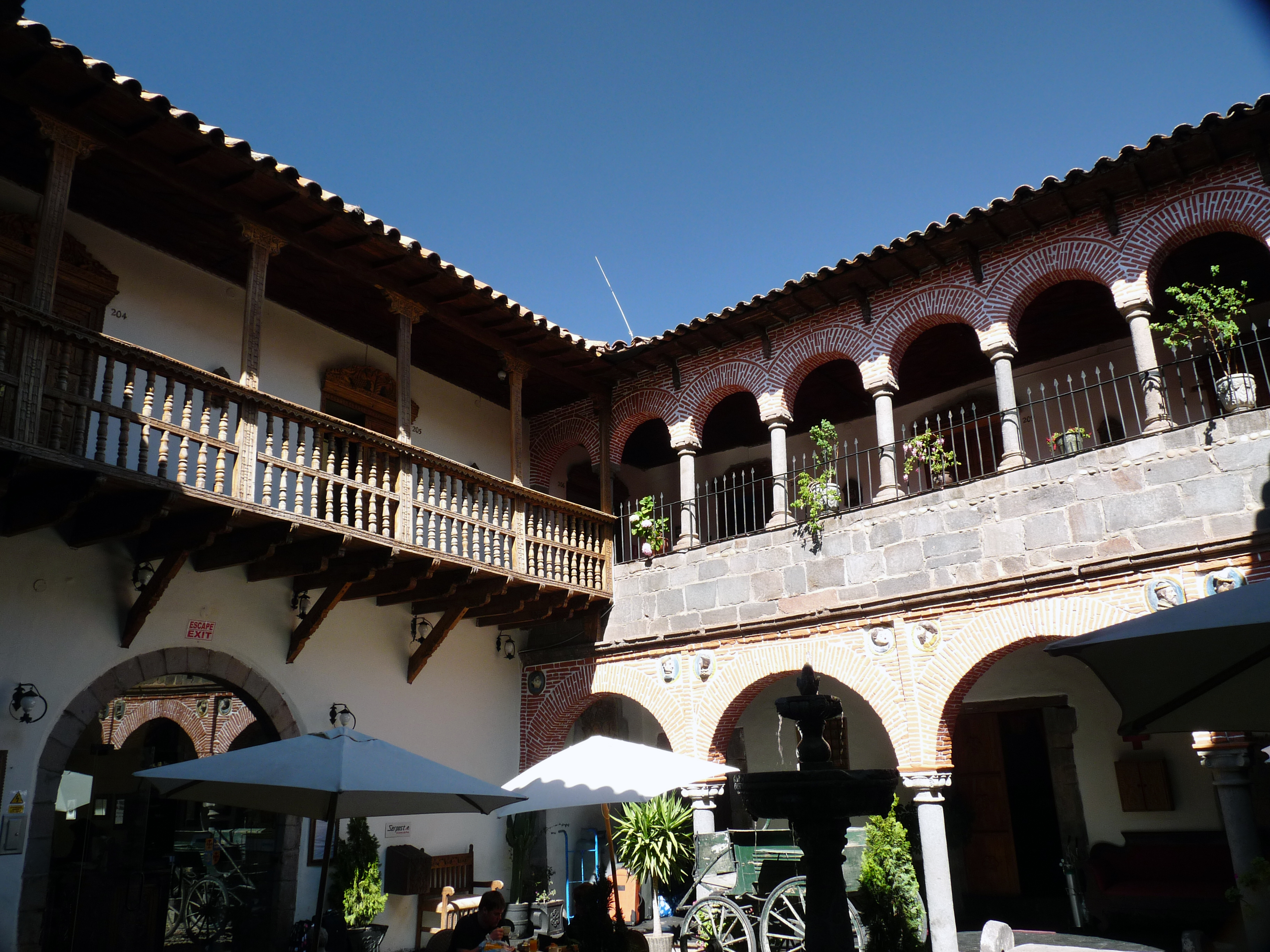
Colonial civil building

Because of its antiquity and importance, the city center retains many buildings, plazas, streets and churches from colonial times, and even some pre-Columbian structures, which led to its declaration as a World Heritage Site by UNESCO in 1983. Among the main sights of the city are:

==== Barrio de San Blas ====
This neighborhood houses artisans, workshops and craft shops. It is one of the most picturesque sites in the city. Its streets are steep and narrow with old houses built by the Spanish over important Inca foundations. It has an attractive square and the oldest parish church in Cusco, built in 1563, which has a carved wooden pulpit considered the epitome of Colonial era woodwork in Cusco.

The Quechua name of this neighborhood is Tuq'ukachi, which means the opening of the salt.

==== Hatun Rumiyuq ====
This street is the most visited by tourists. On the street Hatun Rumiyoq ("the one with the big stone") was the palace of Inca Roca, which was converted to the Archbishop's residence.

Along this street that runs from the Plaza de Armas to the Barrio de San Blas, one can see the Stone of Twelve Angles, which is viewed as a marvel of ancient stonework and has become emblematic of the city's history.

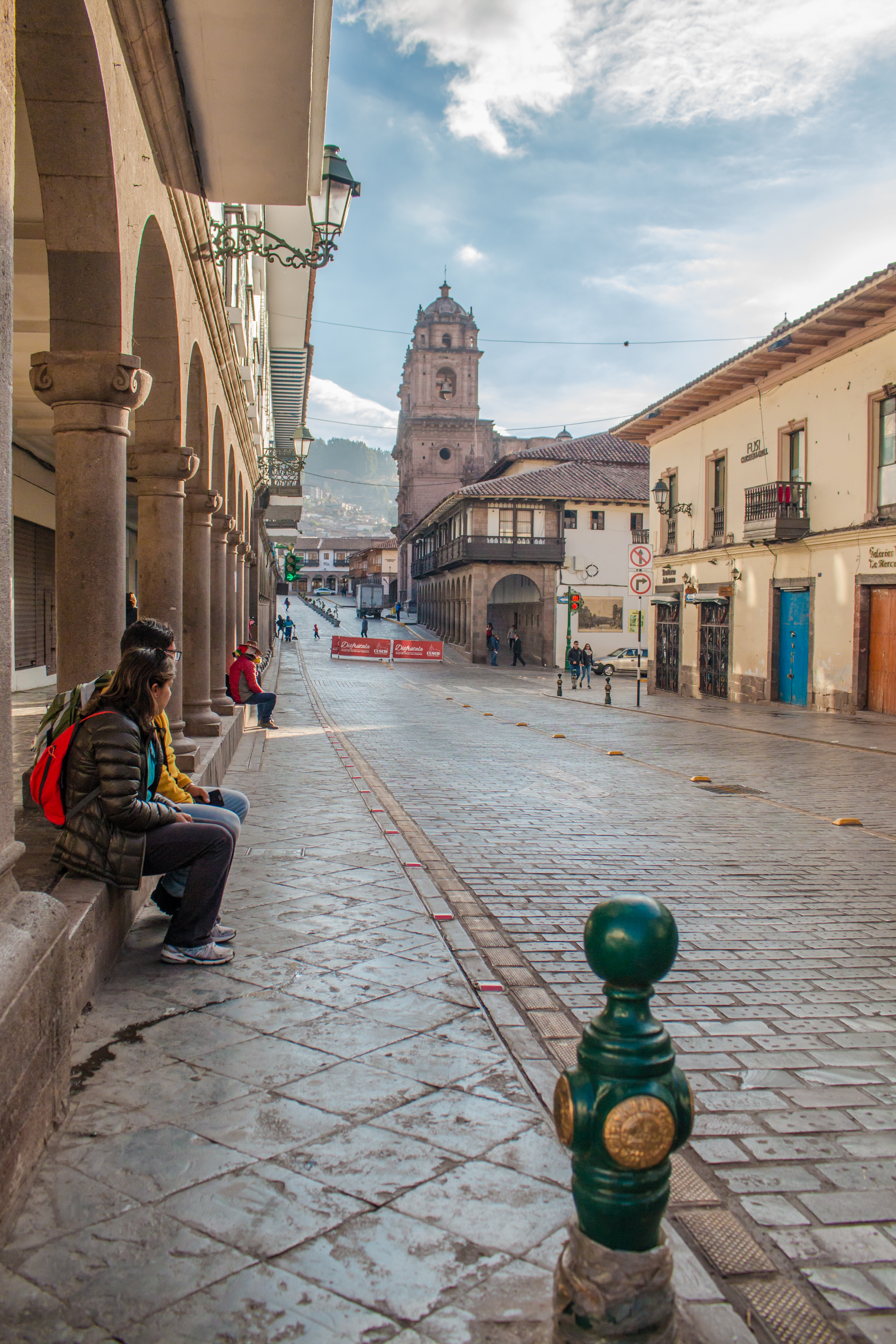
View of the bell tower of the Basilica of La Merced, Cusco

==== Basílica de la Merced ====
Its foundation dates from 1536. The first complex was destroyed by the earthquake of 1650. Its rebuilding was completed in 1675.

Its cloisters of Baroque Renaissance style, choir stalls, colonial paintings and wood carvings are highlights, now a popular museum.

Also on view is an elaborate monstrance made of gold and gemstones that weighs 22 kg (49 lb) and is 130 cm (51.18 in) in height.

==== Cathedral ====
The first cathedral built in Cusco is the Iglesia del Triunfo, built in 1539 on the foundations of the Palace of Viracocha Inca. Today, this church is an auxiliary chapel of the cathedral.

The main basilica cathedral of the city was built between 1560 and 1664. The main material used was stone, which was extracted from nearby quarries, although some blocks of red granite were taken from the fortress of Saksaywaman.

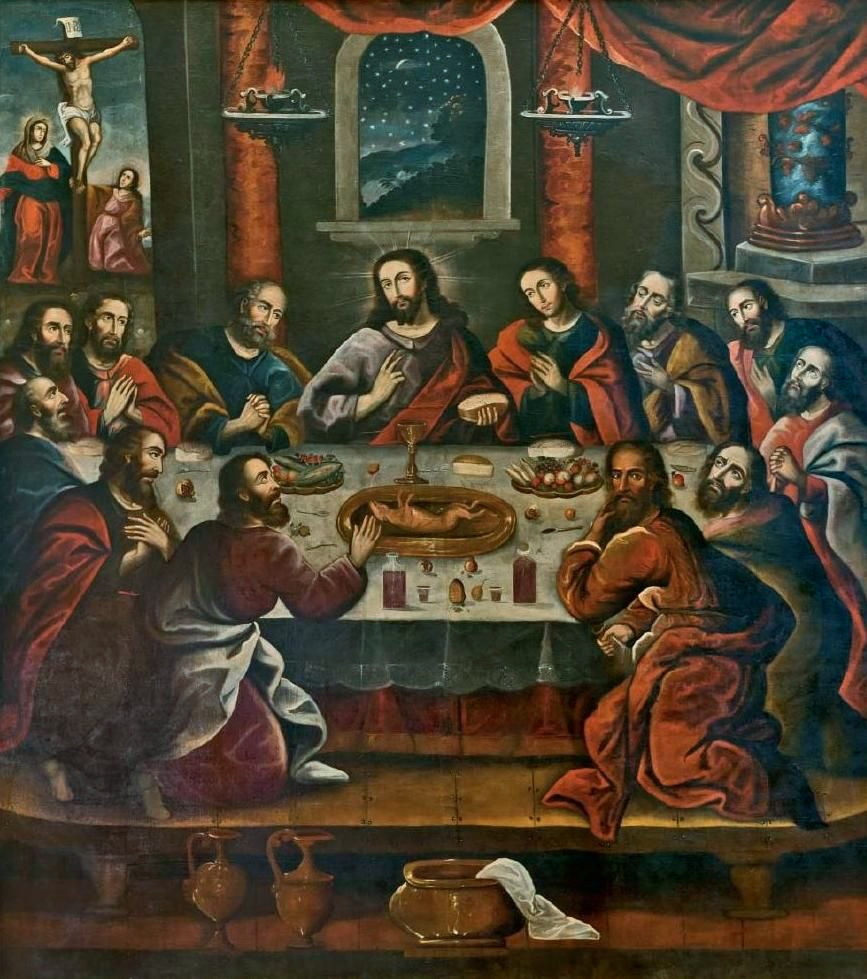
Jesus and his apostles sharing an Andean cuy in Marcos Zapata's The Last Supper

The cathedral presents late-Gothic, Baroque and plateresque interiors and has one of the iconic examples of colonial goldwork. Its carved wooden altars are also important.

The city developed a distinctive style of painting known as the "Cuzco School" and the cathedral houses a major collection of local artists of the time. The cathedral is known for a Cusco School painting of the Last Supper depicting Jesus and the twelve apostles feasting on guinea pig, a traditional Andean delicacy.

The cathedral is the seat of the Archdiocese of Cuzco.

==== Plaza de Armas de Cusco ====
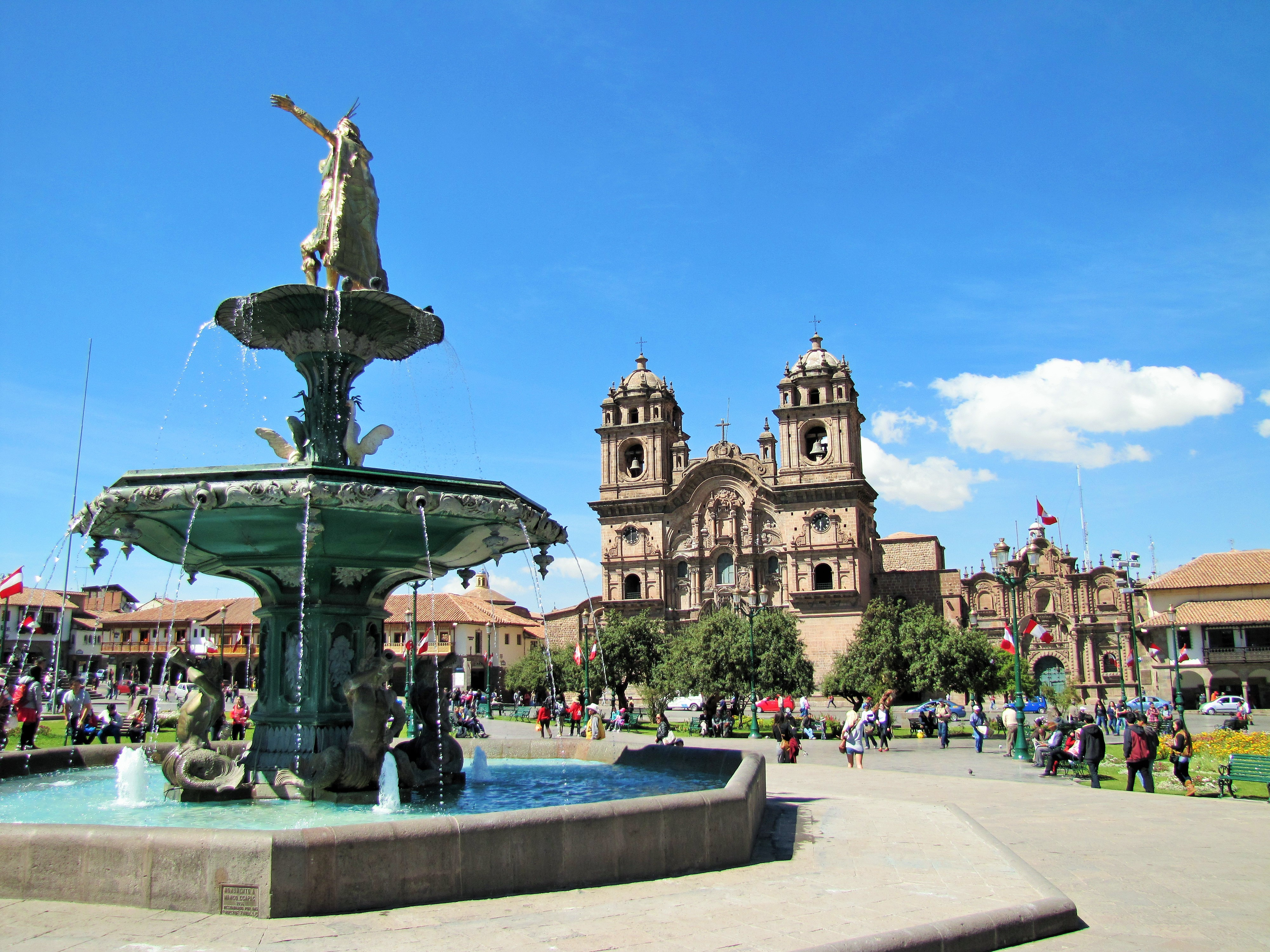
Plaza de Armas of Cusco

Known as the "Square of the warrior" in the Inca era, this plaza has been the scene of several important events, such as the proclamation by Francisco Pizarro in the conquest of Cuzco.

Similarly, the Plaza de Armas was the scene of the death of Túpac Amaru II, considered the indigenous leader of the resistance. The Spanish built stone arcades around the plaza which endure to this day. The main cathedral and the Church of La Compañía both open directly onto the plaza.

The cast iron fountain in Plaza de Armas was manufactured by Janes, Beebe & Co.

==== Iglesia de la Compañía de Jesús ====
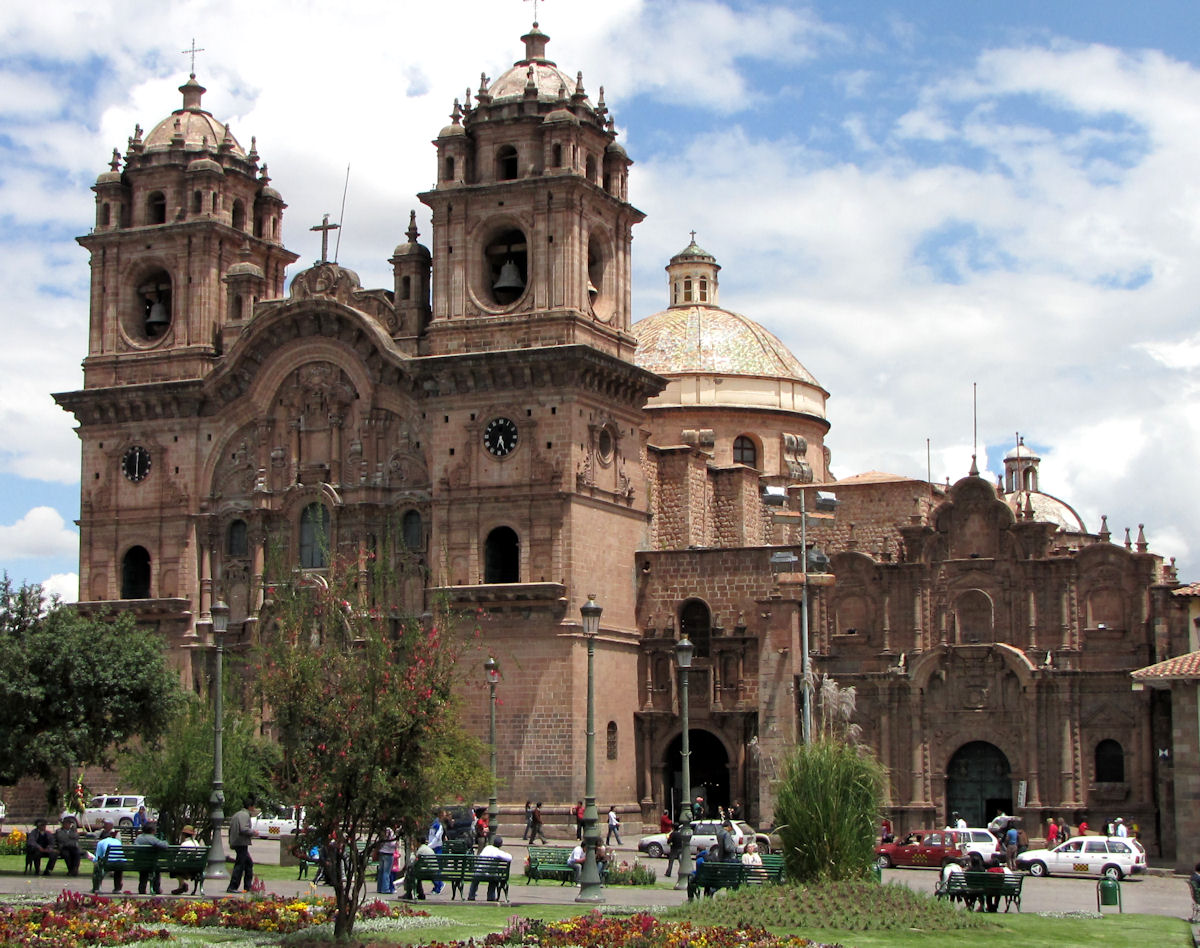
Iglesia de la Compañía de Jesús

This church (Church of the Society of Jesus), whose construction was initiated by the Jesuits in 1576 on the foundations of the Amarucancha or the palace of the Inca ruler Wayna Qhapaq, is considered one of the best examples of colonial baroque style in the Americas.

Its façade is carved in stone and its main altar is made of carved wood covered with gold leaf. It was built over an underground chapel and has a valuable collection of colonial paintings of the Cusco School, the first school established in Peru and also in the Americas.

The church is situated in the Plaza de Armas and to the left of the Cusco Cathedral, which is home to the Roman Catholic Archdiocese of Cusco.

==== Qurikancha and Convent of Santo Domingo ====
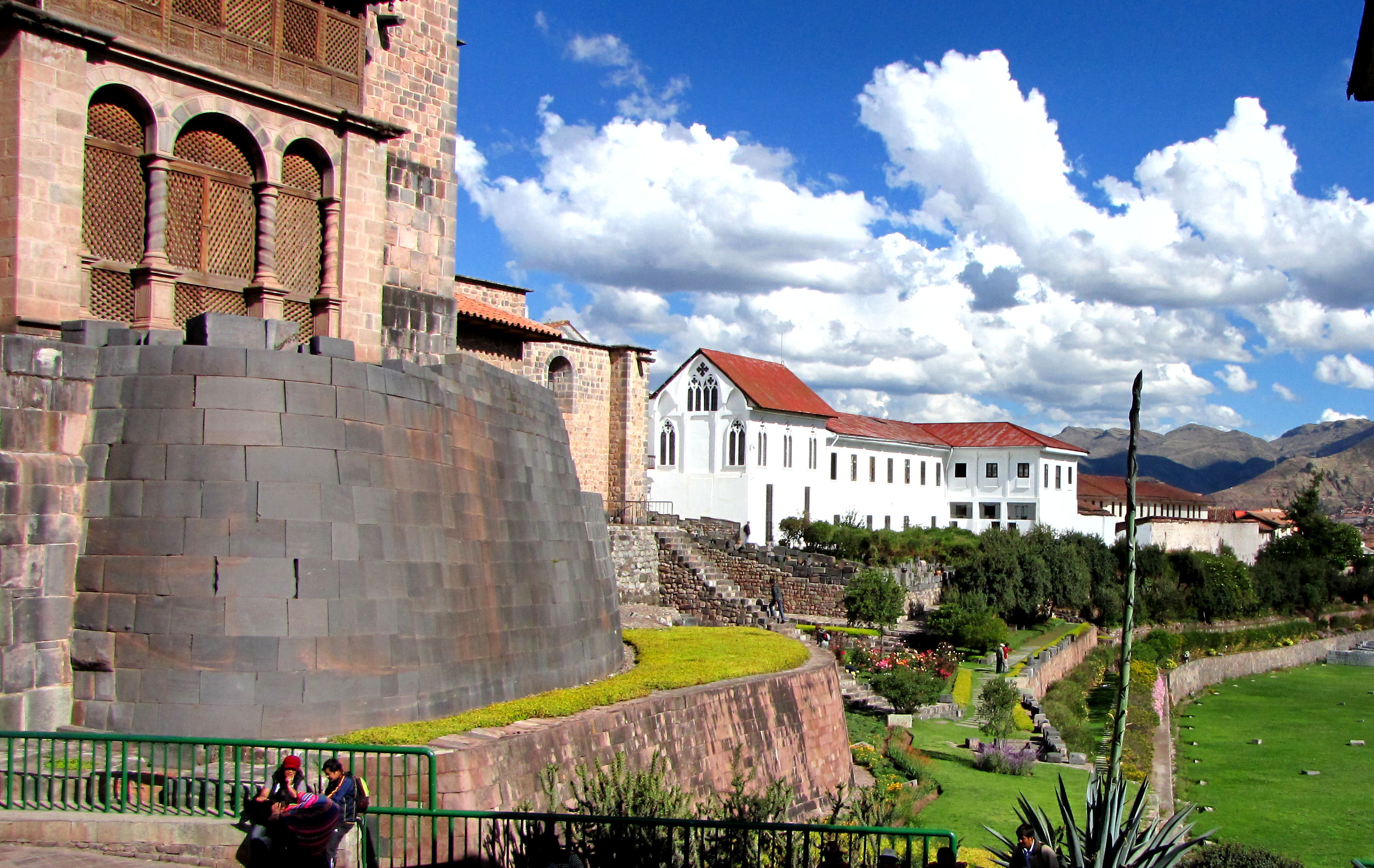
Qurikancha, Convento de Santo Domingo and Intipanpa

The Coricancha or Qurikancha ('golden place') was the most important sanctuary dedicated to the Sun God (Inti) at the time of the Inca Empire. According to ancient chronicles written by Garcilaso de la Vega (chronicler), Qurikancha was said to have featured a large solid golden disc that was studded with precious stones and represented the Inca Sun God – Inti. Spanish chroniclers describe the Sacred Garden in front of the temple as a garden of golden plants with leaves of beaten gold, stems of silver, solid gold corn-cobs and 20 life-size llamas and their herders all in solid gold.

The temple was destroyed by its Spanish invaders who, as they plundered, were determined to rid the city of its wealth, idolaters and shrines. Nowadays, only a curved outer wall and partial ruins of the inner temple remain at the site.

With this structure as a foundation, colonists built the Convent of Santo Domingo in the Renaissance style. The building, with one baroque tower, exceeds the height of many other buildings in this city.

Inside is a large collection of paintings from the Cuzco School.

== Infrastructure ==
=== Transport ===
==== Air ====
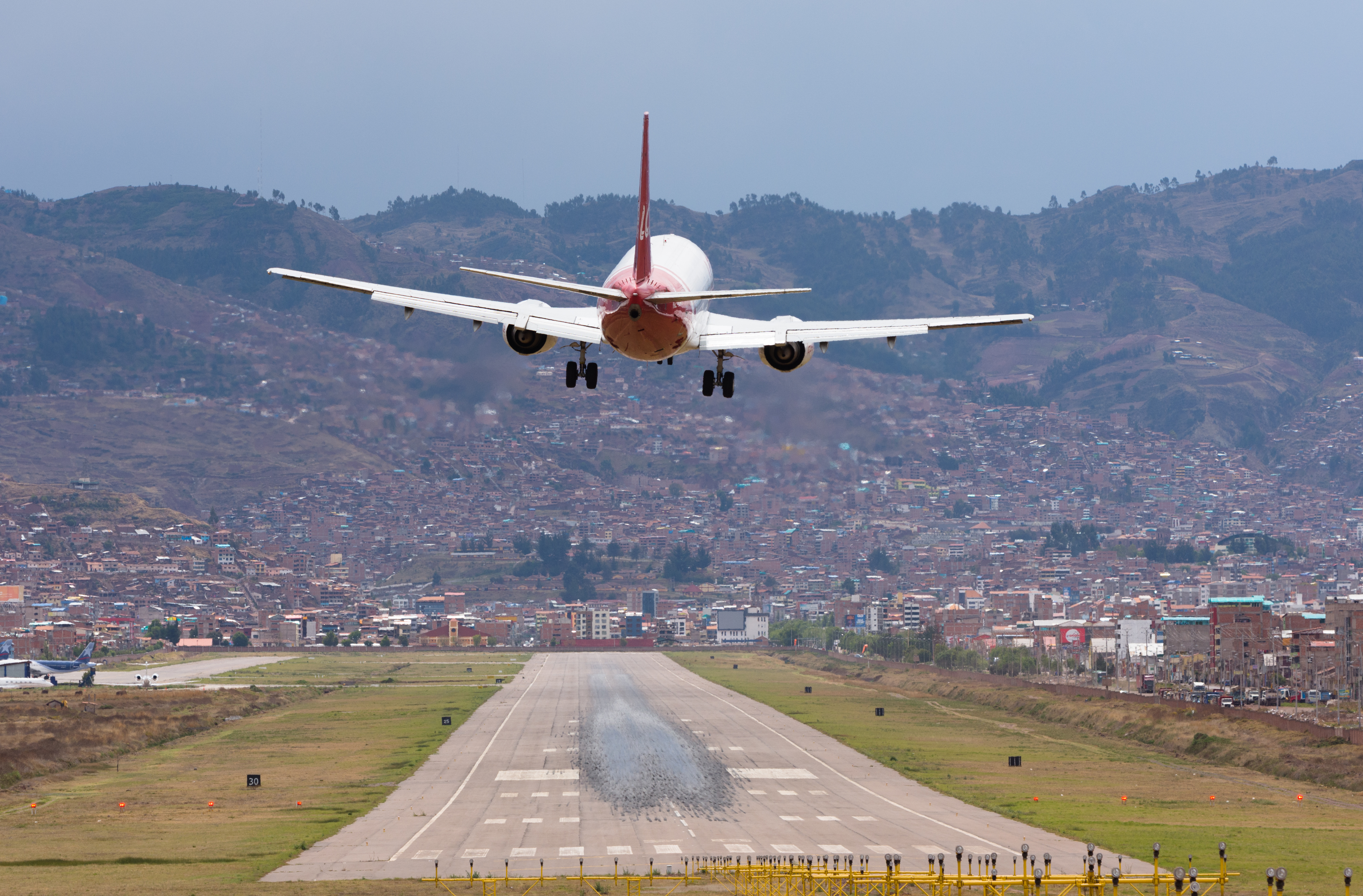
Alejandro Velasco Astete International Airport runway

Cusco's main international airport is Alejandro Velasco Astete International Airport, which provides service to 5 domestic destinations and 3 international ones. It is named in honor of Peruvian pilot Alejandro Velasco Astete who was the first person to fly across the Andes in 1925 when he made the first flight from Lima to Cusco. The airport is the second busiest in Peru after Lima's Jorge Chávez International Airport. It will soon be replaced by Chinchero International Airport. which will provide access to North America and Europe.

==== Rail ====
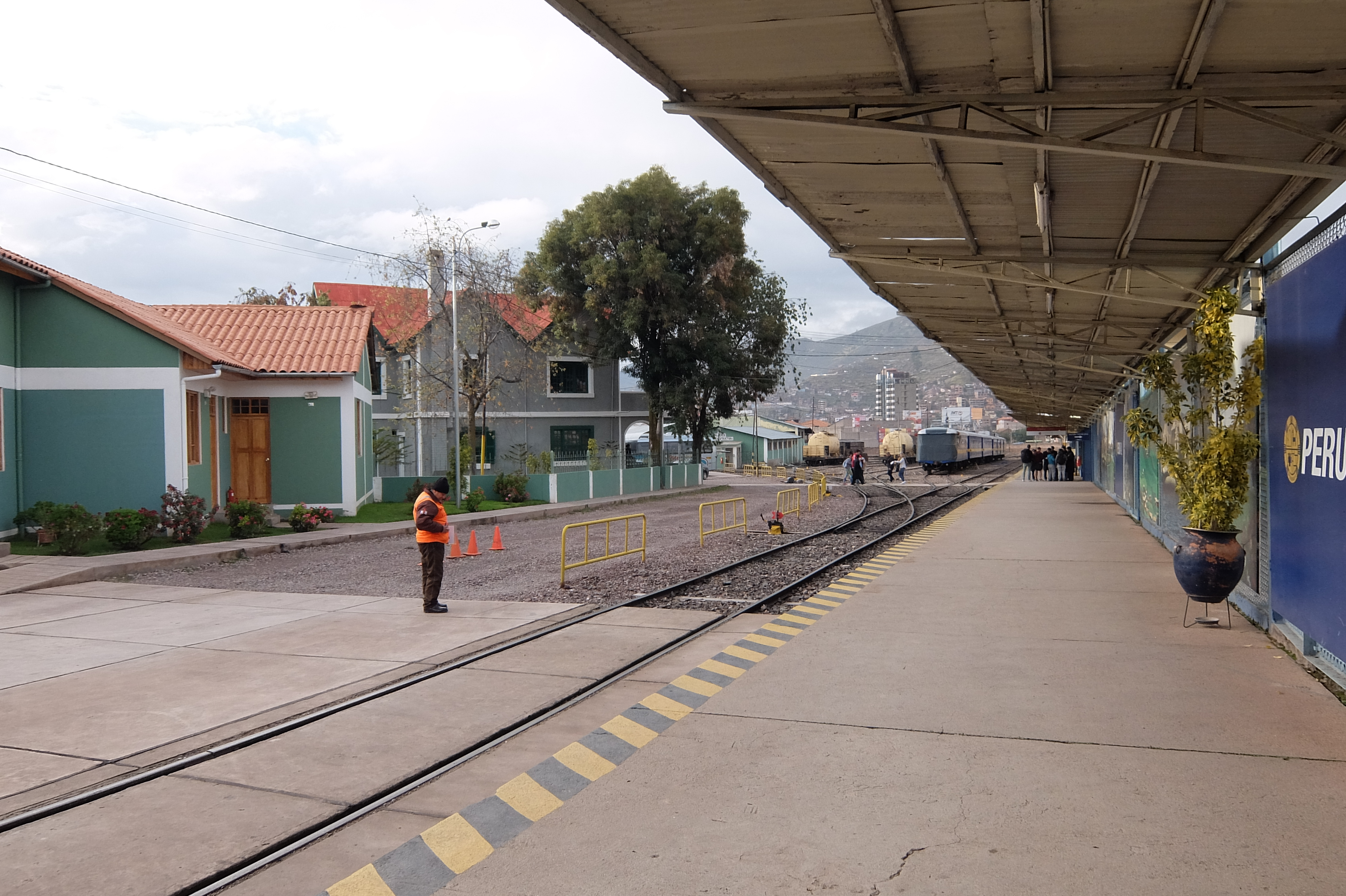
Train station in Wanchaq, Cusco

Cusco is connected by rail to the cities of Juliaca and Arequipa through the southern section of the Southern Railway, whose terminus in the city is the Wánchaq station. Additionally, from the San Pedro station, the southeastern section of the Southern Railroad (the former Cusco-Santa Ana-Quillabamba Railway) departs from the city, which is the route to the ancient Inca citadel of Machu Picchu. PeruRail is the largest Peruvian railway company and provides service to stations in Cusco.

==== Road ====
By road, it is connected to the cities of Puerto Maldonado, Arequipa, Abancay, Juliaca and Puno. The road that connects it with the city of Abancay is also the fastest to reach Lima after a journey of more than 20 hours crossing the departments of Apurímac, Ayacucho, Ica and Lima.

=== Healthcare ===
Cusco, as the administrative and economic center of the region, hosts numerous public and private health facilities. Public healthcare is provided by the Ministry of Health, including the Regional Hospital and Hospital Antonio Lorena. Additionally, EsSalud operates several institutions, such as Adolfo Guevara Velazco Hospital, Metropolitan Polyclinic, San Sebastián Polyclinic, Santiago Polyclinic, and La Recoleta Polyclinic.

== Twin towns – sister cities ==
Cusco is twinned with:

- Athens, Greece
- Baguio, Philippines
- Bethlehem, Palestine
- Chartres, France
- Copán Ruinas, Honduras
- Cuenca, Ecuador
- Havana, Cuba
- Jersey City, United States
- Kaesong, North Korea
- Kraków, Poland
- Kyoto, Japan
- Madison, United States
- Mexico City, Mexico
- Moscow, Russia
- La Paz, Bolivia
- Potosí, Bolivia
- Puebla, Mexico
- Rio de Janeiro, Brazil
- Samarkand, Uzbekistan
- San Miguel de Allende, Mexico
- Santa Barbara, United States
- Takayama, Japan
- Tempe, United States
- Xi'an, China
- West Jerusalem, Israel

== See also ==
- History of Cusco
- Colonial Cusco Painting School
- Governorate of New Castile
- Inca religion in Cusco
- Inca road system
- Iperu, tourist information and assistance
- List of archaeoastronomical sites sorted by country
- PeruRail
- Peru's Challenge
- Pikillaqta
- Santurantikuy
- Tampukancha, Inca religious site
- Tourism in Peru
- Wanakawri
- Centro Qosqo de Arte Nativo

== Bibliography ==
- Chandler, Tertius; Fox, Gerald (1974). 3000 Years of Urban Growth. New York and London: Academic Press. ISBN 9780127851099.
