= Historic Centre of Cusco =

World Heritage Site in Peru

UNESCO World Heritage Site
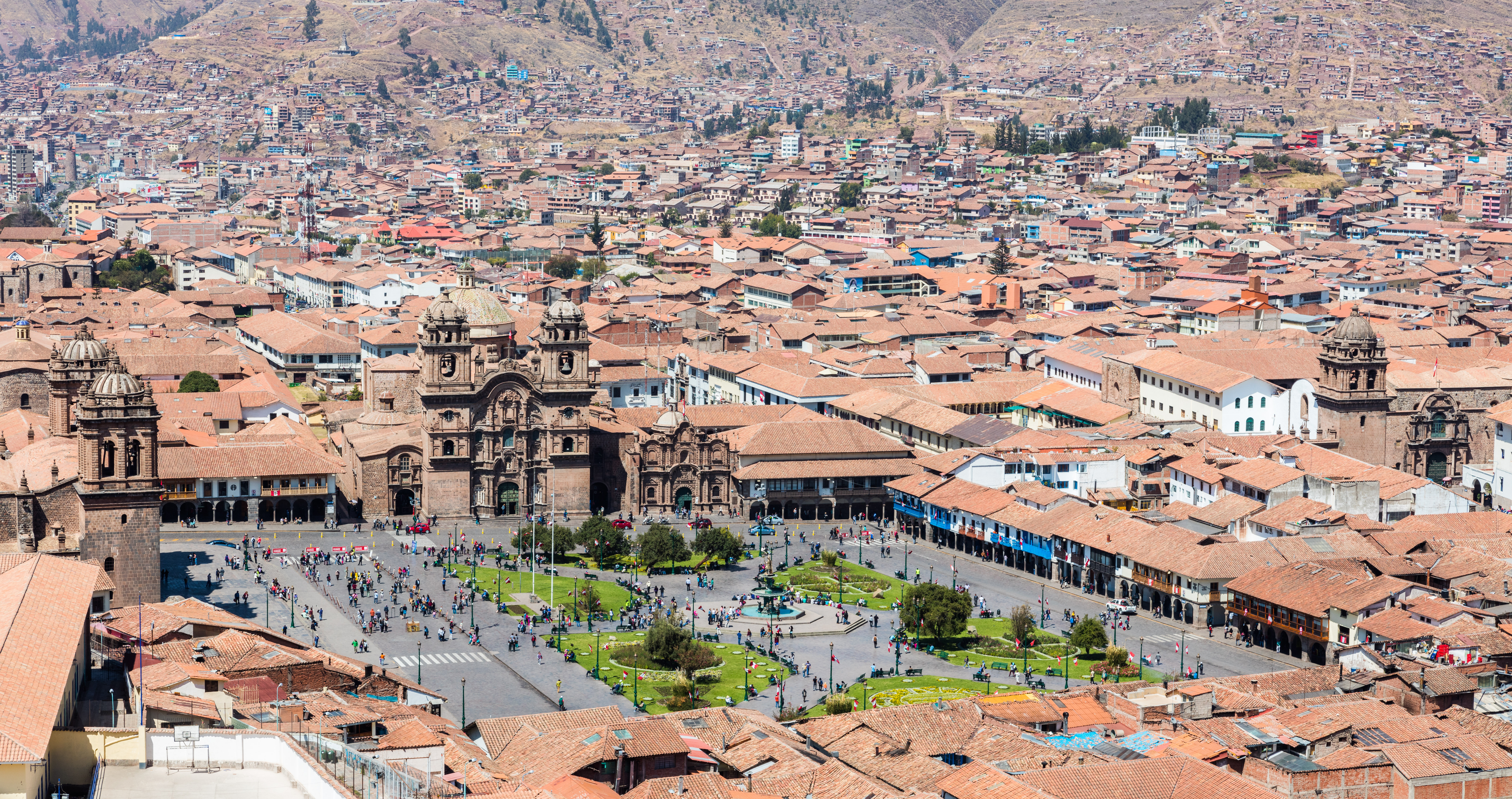
- View of the city's main square

- Location within Peru
- Location: Cusco, Peru
- Criteria: Cultural: (iii)(iv)
- Reference: 273
- Inscription: 1983 (7th Session)
- Area: 142.48 ha (352.1 acres)
- Buffer zone: 284.93 ha (704.1 acres)
- Coordinates: 13°31′2.194″S 71°58′48.014″W

Cultural Heritage of Peru
- Official name: Zona Monumental de la Ciudad del Cusco
- Type: Immovable tangible
- Criteria: Monumental Zone
- Designated: 28 December 1972; 53 years ago
- Legal basis: R.S. Nº 2900-72-ED

The Historic Centre of Cusco (Spanish: Centro histórico de Cusco, CHC), is the historic city centre of the Peruvian city of Cusco, the former capital of the Inca Empire. It consists of two areas: the first is the Monumental Zone established by the Peruvian government in 1972, and the second one—contained within the first one—is the World Heritage Site established by UNESCO in 1983 under the name of City of Cuzco (Spanish: Ciudad del Cusco), where a selected number of buildings are marked with the organisation's blue-and-white shield since 2021.

Originally the capital of the Inca Empire, it was captured by the Spanish Empire in 1533 as a result of the Inca Civil War, becoming an important urban centre of the Viceroyalty of Peru, as well as its capital after the capture of Lima in 1821 during the Peruvian War of Independence. After a republic was established, the city lost its influence to Lima, the capital of independent Peru. It is one of the most important tourist destinations of Peru.

== History ==
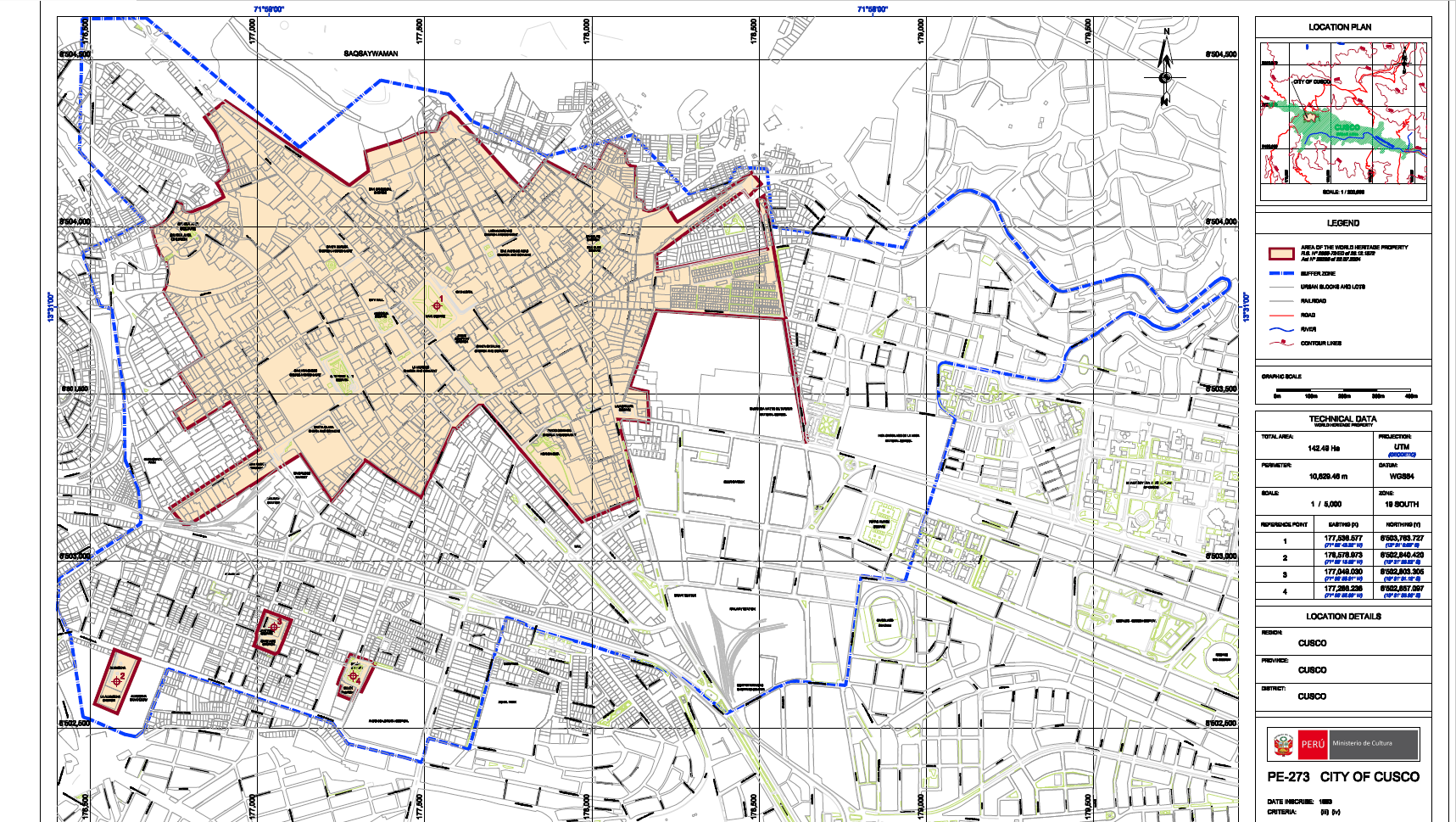
UNESCO map of Cusco.

The city was originally the site of the Killke culture, who occupied it between 900 and 1200 AD. It afterwards served as the capital and namesake of the Kingdom of Cuzco, which in turn was replaced by the Inca Empire, who also established the city as the empire's capital. During the Inca Civil War, the city was controlled by Huáscar until its capture by Atahualpa's forces following the Battle of Quipaipán in 1532. Shortly after, the city was captured by the Spanish Empire, who demolished a number of already existing buildings and structures, using them as the bases for new constructions and thus leading to a mixture of Incan and Spanish architecture, such as in the neighbourhoods of Santa Clara and San Blas, while preserving the original spatial organisation of the city.

Under the Viceroyalty of Peru, the city served as an important urban centre, connected to the southern part of the viceroyalty. During this period, it saw episodes such as the rebellions of Túpac Amaru II and of the so-called "Government Junta" in 1814. During the Peruvian War of Independence, it briefly served as the capital of the viceroyalty between 1821 and 1824, after Lima was captured by the forces of José de San Martín. After independence, its influence was overshadowed by that of Lima, the capital of the Republic of Peru. During the War of the Pacific, it played an important role in assisting the Peruvian resistance movement, and a decade later it played an important role in the civil war between then president Andrés A. Cáceres and former president and political rival Nicolás de Piérola.

A major earthquake on 21 May hit in 1950, and caused damage in more than one third of the city's structures. Those built by the Spanish were more affected than those of the Incas, although the masonry of the retaining walls of the former Coricancha was rediscovered after they were exposed by the earthquake. Restoration works were carried out in the temple to completely expose the Inca structure without compromising the integrity of the Spanish building.

The city was declared a Monumental Area by the Peruvian government in 1972 (with expansions made in 1974 and 1991), and was subsequently declared a World Heritage Site by UNESCO in 1983. In 2021, the first blue-and-white shield of the city was added to the former residence of Inca Garcilaso de la Vega, with other shields added to the Municipal Palace and the Municipal Theatre soon after. In 2022, more shields were added to the Catholic temples at the main square of the city. In 2023, another shield was added to the Museum of Pre-Columbian Art.

== List of sites ==
The World Heritage Site, divided into a main site with three different exclaves within its buffer zone, features a number of landmarks.

=== Main Square and Historic Centre ===
The main zone is that of the Main Square and Historic Centre (139.35 ha; buffer zone: 284.93 ha), which features the following:

List of Landmarks included within the UNESCO World Heritage Site
Name	Location	Notes	Photo
Archbishop's Palace	C. Hatun Rumiyoq s/n	Located on the site of the former palace of Inca Roca, it is the property of the Roman Catholic Archdiocese of Cusco, which operates the Museum of Religious Art within its premises since 1966. It was acquired during the 20th century by Felipe Hermosa, who served as first Archbishop of Cuzco after its elevation.	
Casa de Alonso de Toro	C. Marqués 215	The house is named after its owner, Alonso de Toro. He served as lieutenant governor upon Gonzalo Pizarro's entry to the city and later offered a pardon to Diego de Almagro's followers if they also killed Manco Inca, which they did in 1545.	
Casa del Almirante	Cuesta del Almirante 103	Located on the former premises of the Inca Huáscar, it housed people such as Conquistador Diego de Almagro (its first resident), Viceroy José de la Serna and Confederate Head of State Andrés de Santa Cruz. It is currently the property of the National University of Saint Anthony the Abbot, functioning as the Museo Inka.	
Casa Álvarez	C. Q'era 283	The building was incorporated to what is now another residence until 1658. Its ownership was transferred a number of times, being now known after the Álvarez family, who occupied it from 1689 to 1784. It currently functions as an apartment building and hotel.	
Casa Barrionuevo	Plazoleta Santo Domingo	The building is located on the block of the Kusicancha where the Inca Pachacuti is believed to have been born. As with a number of other buildings in the city, it incorporates Incan features within its structure.	
Casa Cabrera	Plazoleta de las Nazarenas	The building was originally an Inca ceremonial courthouse. In 1580, it was acquired by the conquistador Alonso Díaz and subsequently built over in Colonial style to become the home of an elite member of Cusco society, the Viceroy Hernandez de Cabrera, for whom the mansion is named. It then passed through many hands and had multiple functions, ultimately falling into a ruinous state. After a restoration by the Fundación BBVA, the Museum of Pre-Columbian Art re-opened in June 2003.	
Casa Calderón Ugarte	C. Procuradores 341	Built over the Qasana, a palace of the Inca Pachacuti, it is named after its owners since 1881, the Calderón family. Of these, the best known is Serapio Calderón, who served as president in 1904. His descendants are currently the owners of the property.	
Casa de Carmen Alto 166	C. Carmen Alto 166	Featuring a patio inside, it currently functions as a hotel.	—N/a
Casa de Carmen Alto 236	C. Carmen Alto 236	The two-storey building also features a patio within its premises, as well as an enclosed balcony.	
Casa de Choquechaca 366-384	C. Choquechaka 366-384	The two-storey building features patios within its premises, and is best known for its restaurant, Quinta Eulalia.	
Casa Corazao	C. Pampa del Castillo 320	The two-storey building dates back to the 16th and 17th centuries. Its façade features balconies built during the Republican era.	
Casa Concha	C. Santa Catalina Ancha 320	Built over the former Puka Marka, the residence of Túpac Yupanqui, it is owned by the National University of Saint Anthony the Abbot, which operates the Machu Picchu Museum within its premises since 2011.	
Casa de Clorinda Matto de Turner	San Francisco Square	The building dates back to the 17th century, and served as the residence of well-known writer Clorinda Matto de Turner. It was restored by the National Institute of Culture in 1974 and currently functions as the local premises of EsSalud, as well as a nursing home.	
Casa de los cuatro bustos	C. San Agustín 400	In 1533, its terrain was originally owned by Gonzalo Pizarro, who sold it to Marquess Juan de Salas y Valdez, who ordered the construction of the two-storey building. It was used as the Viceregal Museum until it was renamed and moved in 1967. In 1976 it was purchased by the Hoteles Libertador chain, and ultimately acquired by Starwood Hotels and Resorts in 2013.	
Casa Ferrari	C. San Agustín 239	The terrain was first granted by Francisco Pizarro to Conquistador Miguel Sánchez Ponce, present at the Battle of Cajamarca. His descendants rebuilt the house after it was destroyed during the 1650 earthquake, and it was refurbished years later by General Bernardo Pardo de Figueroa, member of the aristocracy in Lima who married one of these heiresses. Since 2001, it functions as a hotel owned by Novotel.	
Casa de Garcilaso de la Vega	Plaza Regocijo	The birthplace and residence of chronicler Inca Garcilaso de la Vega, it was converted into a museum in 1946, which continues to operate to this day. A blue-and-white shield was added to its façade in 2021.	
Casa Gonzales Willis	C. Nueva Alta 537	The building features a zaguan in its entrance, as well as two wooden balconies and a patio within its premises.	
Casa Guevara	Cuesta de Santa Ana 601	The three-storey building is located on a slope and dates back to the 17th century, featuring a modified wooden balcony. It currently functions as an inn.	
Casa Gutiérrez Guerrero	C. Granada 255-259	In 1591, the two-storey house was the property of Antonio Sánchez and in 1634 of a repartimiento. It was modified in 1748 and completely destroyed in 1796. Modified in 1952, it once formed part of the residence of Clorinda Matto de Turner.	
Casa Huaco Bustos	C. Siete Cuartones 352-378	In 1700 this house was annexed along with its adjacent ones up to Méloc Street and its owner was Juan de Mendoza y Contreras. In 1740 the Company of Jesus appears as its owner who later, in 1747, exchanged it with Andrés Navarro Cacha Gualpa and Pascuala Quispe for the houses they had next to the Jesuit College. It is known that in this same year in one of these annexed houses, there was a bakery and the one on the corner had a water fountain.	
Casa de Ildefonso Muñecas	C. Matará 446	The two-storey house is named after Ildefonso de las Muñecas, a priest who lived there and assisted the rebel movement of 1814.	
Casa de Illán Suárez de Carbajal	Plaza Regocijo	It is named after Illán Suárez de Carbajal, who was granted the terrain upon the city's foundation. In 1555, Corregidor Sebastián Garcilaso de la Vega y Vargas granted the construction of a number of buildings, one of which was built upon this terrain. It was later demolished and rebuilt.	
Casa Lercaros	C. Espaderos 235	In 1555, Corregidor Sebastián Garcilaso de la Vega y Vargas granted the construction of a number of buildings, one of which was built upon this terrain. Partially destroyed during the earthquakes of 1650 and 1950, it was modified in 1900 and restored in 1988.	
Casa de Mateo Pumacahua	C. Saphy 510	Built during the 17th century, the two-storey building features two patios and a private chapel. During the final years of the Viceroyalty, it was the residence of Mateo Pumacahua, after whom it is named. It was acquired by the government during the early 20th century and initially housed a girls-only school, currently housing a police station.	
Casa del Marqués de Valleumbroso	C. Marqués 271	It is named after its inhabitants, the members of the Marquisate of San Lorenzo de Valle Umbroso, who lived in the building until 1780, when the widow of the fifth marquess moved to the Casa de Pilatos in Lima. It is currently used by the Diego Quispe Tito University of Fine Arts.	
Casa Meloc 422	C. Meloc 422	The two-storey building features two patios within its premises. It currently functions as a hotel.	
Casa Meloc 442	C. Meloc 442	The two-storey building features two patios within its premises. It currently functions as a hostel and a private residence.	
Casa de Miota	Plaza Regocijo	The current three-storey building dates back to the 19th and 20th centuries. It once served as the residence of Francisca Zubiaga y Bernales (1803–1835), who was first lady from 1829 to 1833 through her marriage to President Agustín Gamarra. It currently operates as a hotel.	
Casa de Nueva Baja 496	C. Nueva Baja 496	The two-storey building features a patio within its premises. It currently functions as a hotel and restaurant.	
Casa Núñez del Prado	C. Choquechaka 338	The two-storey building features a zaguan in its entrance, and an enclosed balcony. It currently serves a mixed purpose, housing private residences and a store.	
Casa de Oblitas	C. Arones 395	Also known as the Casa de Sierra, it had been built by 1641 and is named after Cipriano de Oblitas, who lived there from 1682 to 1773. It was acquired by politician Manuel Mariano Cáceres in 1916, with his descendants becoming the building's sole owners on September 2, 1939.	
Casa de Oliart	C. Santa Teresa 344	Also known as the Casa Picoaga, it was the property of Marquess José Picoaga y Arbiza, who built it between 1745 and 1751. Its current name comes from a family descended from him. It was partially destroyed during the 1650 earthquake and finally restored in 1976.	
Casa Ochoa Escalante	C. Amargura 207	It is located in the sector called Huacapunku, corresponding to the terraces that must have existed at the back of what Garcilaso de la Vega describes as the Yachaywasi. During the viceregal period, it belonged to the conqueror Pedro Alonso, becoming of great importance. The property suffered partial destruction caused by the earthquakes of 1650, 1950 and 1987 in which the house was subdivided and morphologically affected, dividing the original patio and the property into 2 fractions by a brick wall.	
Casa Ochoa Raa	C. Saphy 635	Dating back to the 17th century, it is also known as the Tambo de Montero because in 1643, a European merchant named Don Pedro Montero de Espinoza lived here. Local traditions narrate that the Jews residing in the city congregated in this place, going so far as to assure that it was a true Synagogue, which is why it was awarded to the royal property of the King, being subsequently abandoned by its occupants.	
Casa Rodríguez	C. Arequipa 250	The building dates back to the 17th to 18th centuries and features a large gate on its entrance. It currently functions as a private multi-family residence with a business witihin its premises.	
Casa de Rozas Velasco	C. San Bernardo 192	Dating back to the 17th century, it is located next to the former College of San Bernardo and served as the residence of Serapio Calderón, who served as president in 1904 and as rector of the National University of Saint Anthony the Abbot.	
Casa Salazar Guevara	C. Choquechaka 350	Dating back to the 17th century, the two-storey building features two patios within its premises, as well as an enclosed wooden balcony in its façade.	
Casa Siete Cuartones 290	C. Siete Cuartones 290	The two-storey building features a patio within its premises. It currently houses a number of businesses, including a hostel.	
Casa Silva	Parque de la Madre	One of the oldest constructions in the city, it dates back to the 16th century and incorporates Inca features within its structure. It was originally part of the terrain awarded to Conquistador Diego de Silva y Guzmán and was finished before 1570, as Father Reginaldo de Lizárraga gives a description of the building on that year. From 1571 to 1572, it housed Viceroy Francisco de Toledo. It was acquired by Captain Antonio de Zea in 1561, who donated part of the land to the convent of Santa Teresa. It housed the city's mint after the War of the Pacific, and was ultimately acquired by the government in the 20th century.	
Casa del Truco	Plaza Regocijo	The house belonged to Conquistador Alonso de Mesa in 1558, being modified in 1621 to face the adjacent public square. It is named after the "truco", a type of cue game that could be found in the building during the 17th century, when it was popular among locals.	
Casa Venero	C. Arones 335, 347 & 359	Initially incorporated into the Casa de Oblitas, it was sold several times during the 17th and 18th centuries. It was acquired by the Franciscans in 1820, who sold it to Captain Rafael Cerén de Urbina, who ultimately sold it again to Cosme de Sarmiento in 1833. It currently houses a number of private residences.	
Casa Yabar Peralta	C. Pampa del Castillo 347	Dating back to the 17th century, the two-storey building incorporates Inca features within its structure. A patio can be found within its premises, as well as an enclosed balcony.	
Cathedral Basilica of the Virgin of the Assumption	Plaza de Armas	Formerly the site of the Suntor Wassi and the Kisoarkancha palaces built during the Inca period, it is the most important religious monument in the historic centre of the city and houses the headquarters of the Roman Catholic Archdiocese of Cuzco, occupying an area of 3,920 m^{2}.	
Church and Convent of La Merced	Plazoleta Espinar	Belonging to the Mercedarians, it was built during the 1530s. It was damaged during the 1650 earthquake and rebuilt by 1670, while the tower was built between 1692 and 1696. It was again damaged during the 1950 earthquake and reopened on December 20, 1996, after being restored.	
Church and Convent of Las Nazarenas	Plazoleta de las Nazarenas	A Nazarene convent until 1977, it incorporates the remains of an Incan building within its structure and currently operates as the five-star Belmond Palacio Nazarenas since 2012. Also known as the Casa de las Sierpes, it reopened in 2020.	
Church and Convent of Saint Catherine of Siena	C. Santa Catalina Angosta	The terrain was acquired by bishop Fernando de Mendoza from its owner, Antonio de la Gama, and donated to the Dominican nuns of Saint Catherine. It opened its doors in 1605 and the monastery's first church was built between 1610 and 1612. The earthquake of 1650 damaged the building, after which it was restored. Since 1975, it hosts a museum dedicated to the Cusco School.	
Church and Convent of Saint Clare	C. Santa Clara	Construction for the convent began in 1602 at the Qorpakancha area, concluding in 1622. On April 30 of the same year, the nuns occupied the building. The earthquake of 1650 only damaged the tower, which was rebuilt. Similarly, the earthquake of 1950 caused no major damages.	
Church and Convent of Saint Francis of Assisi	San Francisco Square	The Franciscans established themselves in the terrain belonging to Hernando Pizarro in 1549, with the construction of a church being ordered by Viceroy Francisco de Toledo in 1572. In 1645, the original building was demolished to modernise it, although the earthquake of 1650 destroyed the work in progress. It was only finished in 1652, located next to the National School of Sciences and Arts.	
Church and Convent of Saint Teresa	C. Siete Cuartones & Saphy	Construction for the convent began on March 9, 1673. In October of that same year, the first nuns arrived. The completed church was blessed by Bishop Manuel de Mollinedo on October 15, 1676, whose remains rest in this church as per his last will. In 1703, the nuns who founded the monastery of the same name in Arequipa left this house.	
Church of the Company of Jesus	Plaza de Armas	Also built over an Inca palace, it is one of the best examples of Spanish Baroque architecture in Peru. The architecture of this building exerted a great influence on the development of Baroque architecture in the South Andes. Its construction began in 1576, but it was badly damaged in an earthquake in 1650. The rebuilt church was completed in 1673.	
Church of Saint Anne	Saint Anne's Square	On April 28, 1559, Corregidor Polo de Ondegardo founded the Indian parish in the Q'armenqa neighbourhood. Thus, on a plain of the hill the church was built, an atrium with a plaza and a tower independent of the temple building. The earthquake of 1650 caused great deterioration in the church, which was rebuilt in the same place.	
Church of Saint Blaise	Saint Blaise Square	Built in a temple dedicated to Illapa in the neighbourhood of T'oqokachi, it was one of the churches built by Polo de Ondegardo. The adjacent square was built on a space known as Arrayan-pata.	
Church of Saint Christopher	C. Don Bosco s/n	Named after Paullu Inca, it dates back to the mid 16th century. It was damaged during the 1650 earthquake, after which it was reconstructed by architect Marcos Uscamayta and under the auspices of bishop Manuel de Mollinedo y Angulo, whose coat or arms is featured in base of the bell tower. The remains of the church's namesake were discovered under the building in 2007.	
Church of Saint Peter	C. Cascaparo s/n	The church was built in 1572, over a hospital originally founded in 1556. The 1650 earthquake collapsed the entire complex with the exception of a single hospital room, being reconstructed two years later. It was again damaged, albeit to a lesser scale, during the earthquake of 1950.	
City Hall	Plaza Regocijo	Originally the palace of the Cabildo of Cuzco, it currently houses the Museum of Contemporary Art of Cuzco since 1995. It was remodelled from 1938 to 1939 under the supervision of architect Emilio Harth Terré.	
Convent of Santo Domingo (Coricancha)		Built upon the most important temple in the Inca Empire, as described by early Spanish colonialists, it is currently a religious complex built by the Spanish which also houses an underground museum dedicated to the former Inca site.	
Municipal Theatre	C. Mesón de la Estrella 149	The theatre, formerly a cinema, houses the city's symphonic orchestra and was built in 1933. Named after Mayor Daniel Estrada Pérez, its administration is in charge of the Regional Government of Cuzco instead of the municipality.	
Paraninfo Universitario	Plaza de Armas	Currently a paranymph of the National University of Saint Anthony the Abbot, it served as the prison of Túpac Amaru II prior to his execution in 1781, as well as that of his family and supporters. Similarly, it served as the prison of the Angulo brothers, who organised the armed rebellion of 1814.	
Plaza de Armas		The central core of modern Cuzco, it is surrounded by tourist restaurants, jewelry stores, travel agencies and the same Catholic churches built during the colonial period and which constitute two of the most important monuments of the city.	
Saint Anthony the Abbot Seminary	Plazoleta de las Nazarenas	The premises of the Andean Baroque seminary from its foundation to its move in 1965, it currently functions as the five-star Belmond Hotel Monasterio since its acquisition in 1995.	
Temple of the Sacred Family	Plaza de Armas	It is located next to the cathedral. Construction began on September 13, 1723. After the death of the architect in charge of the work, it was re-started in 1733 and was completed on September 3, 1735. In 1996, the temple was restored after it was closed about 30 years.	
Twelve-angled stone	Hatunrumiyoc 480	As an example of the Incas' advanced stonework, the stone is a popular tourist attraction in Cuzco and a site of pride for many locals. The perfectly cut stone is part of a wall known as the Hatun Rumiyoc. Although there are other stones with the same vertices, this is the most famous of them.	
Landmarks included within the buffer zone of the World Heritage Site
Church of La Recoleta	Plazoleta Recoleta	Construction began on the church in 1559, founded by Father Francisco de Velasco at the expense of the neighbor Toribio de Bustamante. The church was completed in 1601. The 1650 earthquake seriously affected the temple, after which it was reconstructed. By contrast, the 1950 earthquake caused little damage to the building.	
Limacpampa Square		A number of historians suggest that during the Inca period the plaza would have been the place where locals met to learn of the Sapa Inca's orders. Maintenance works exposed Incan walls in 2008, leading to a site museum being established in the square.	

=== Almudena and Almudena Church ===
The Almudena and Almudena Church (1.35 ha), features the following:

List of Landmarks included within the UNESCO World Heritage Site
Name	Location	Notes	Photo
Almudena	Santiago District	Originally an area known as "La Chimba" by the Spanish arrieros, the construction of its buildings began at the end of the 17th century. It forms an axis that crosses the city which connects with the former Inca road system, itself also a World Heritage Site that Peru shares with Colombia, Ecuador, Bolivia, Chile and Argentina.	
Almudena Cemetery (partial)	Santiago District	Built between 1846 and 1850, its area was chosen due to its distance from the city. Its eastern wing features the cemetery's oldest mausoleums. The oldest dates from 1857 and the identity of the deceased is unknown because the inscriptions have already been erased by time. It was declared a cultural heritage of Peru in 2010.	
Almudena Hospital	Santiago District	Originally a hospital operated by the Bethlehemites, it currently houses the Charity of Cuzco, which operates a women's shelter and the Saint Jean Paul II Mental Hospital, also in the square.	
La Almudena Church	Santiago District	The church was donated to the Bethlehemites in 1698 after its construction concluded on the same year. The 1950 earthquake caused the partial collapse of its bell tower, which was restored by 1951.	

=== Santiago Square and Church ===
The Santiago Square and Church (0.9 ha), features the following:

List of Landmarks included within the UNESCO World Heritage Site
Name	Location	Notes	Photo
Santiago Church	Santiago District	The church was built by Viceroy Francisco de Toledo between 1571 and 1572, within the Indian reduction system, and had to be rebuilt after the 1650 earthquake. Restoration works began in 2019 and concluded in 2022.	
Santiago Square	Santiago District	Featuring features of the pre-Hispanic, Viceregal and Republican eras, it was originally part of the Indian neighbourhood of Chaquillchaca, and its temple was built over an Incan andén.	

=== Belén Square and Church ===
The Belén Square and Church (0.88 ha), features the following:

List of Landmarks included within the UNESCO World Heritage Site
Name	Location	Notes	Photo
Belén Church	Santiago District	Originally an Indian parish known as "Los Reyes", it received an image of the Virgin of Belén on the same year of its foundation, changing its name after the image. Heavily damaged during the 1650 earthquake, reconstruction works only took place some 20 years later, concluding between 1696 and 1715. One of its towers collapsed during the 1950 earthquake, and has since been restored.	
Belén Square	Santiago District	Formerly part of the Incan neighbourhood of Ch'akillchaka and the location where the road to Paruro began, it was depopulated during the last stages of the empire and reestablished as a public square by the Spanish. A monastery was established on April 30, 1551, and a parish followed on April 20, 1559.	
Antonio Lorena Hospital	Santiago District	Built during the 1930s, it continues to operate to date after attempts to move the hospital to a new location were halted due to a corruption scandal that ended with the new building remaining incomplete and non-operational.	

== See also ==
- Santurantikuy, part of the intangible heritage of Peru
- List of World Heritage Sites in Peru
- Cuzco
