= Church of San Francisco, Cusco =

Catholic church of the Franciscan Order in Cusco

Church of San Francisco
- Iglesia de San Francisco
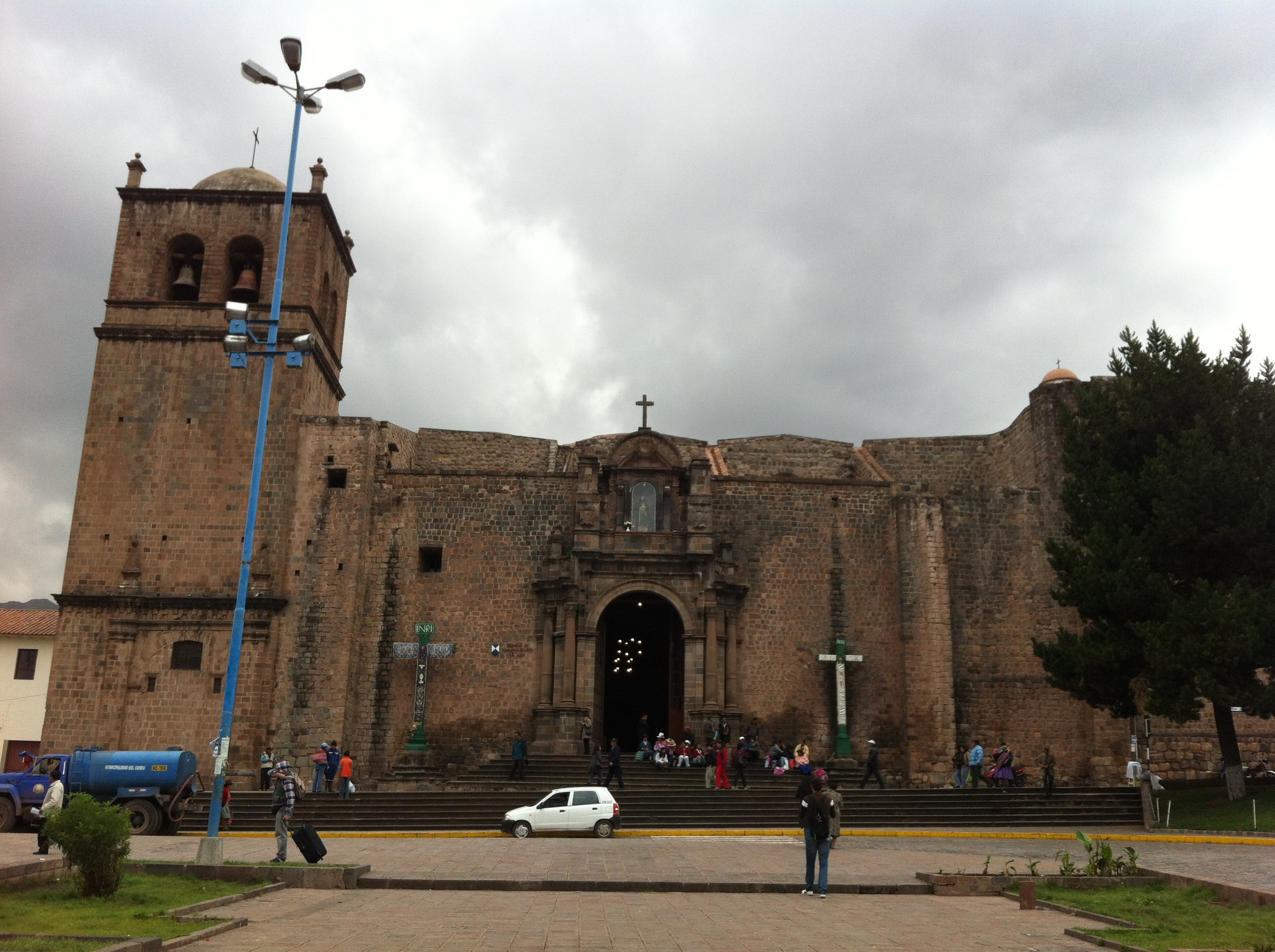
- Side entrance of the Church of San Francisco
- Church of San Francisco
- 13°31′5.63″S 71°58′55.66″W
- Location: Cusco, Peru
- Country: Peru
- Denomination: Catholic
- Sui iuris church: Latin Church
- Religious order: Franciscan Order

History
- Status: Active
- Dedication: Francis of Assisi
- Consecrated: 1572 (first church); 1652 (second church)

Architecture
- Functional status: Church and Convent
- Architect: Francisco Domínguez Chávez
- Architectural type: Church
- Style: Romanesque and Plateresque

Administration
- Diocese: Archdiocese of Cusco

UNESCO World Heritage Site
- Part of: City of Cusco
- Criteria: Cultural: iii, iv
- Reference: 273
- Inscription: 1983 (7th Session)
- Area: Latin America and the Caribbean

Cultural Heritage of Peru
- Official name: Iglesia y Convento de San Francisco
- Type: Immovable tangible
- Criteria: Monument
- Designated: 28 December 1972; 53 years ago
- Legal basis: R.S. Nº 2900-72-ED

The Church of San Francisco is a Franciscan church located in the city of Cusco, Peru. It was built on the southern part of the former Huacaypata (now part of Plaza San Francisco), near the Colegio Ciencias. The Franciscan Convent (Monastery) and its museum are co-located with the church.

Since 1972, the building has been part of the Historic Centre of Cusco, designated as part of the cultural heritage of Peru. Additionally, in 1983, it was included in the city's historic area declared a UNESCO World Heritage Site.

== History ==
Franciscan friars arrived in Cusco shortly after its Spanish foundation. In 1534, they settled in the San Blas district and built a small church under the orders of Friar Pedro Portugués. By 1538, they relocated to the Plaza de Armas in Cusco, taking over the former Inca palace of Qasana. Finally, in 1549, they moved to their current location, about 300 meters southwest of the Plaza de Armas, on land previously granted to Hernando Pizarro, where the Hospital of San Lázaro had been operating.

In 1572, Viceroy Francisco de Toledo ordered the construction of a church dedicated to Francis of Assisi. The architect remains unknown, but Francisco Domínguez Chávez was recorded as the lead mason. The original structure was demolished in 1645 for modernization, but the 1650 Cusco earthquake destroyed most of the progress. The second church was completed in 1652.

== Description ==
The church has a simple design in contrast to other churches in Cusco. It features a single tower with seven bells, including the second-largest in the city. The church is built in a Latin cross shape with three basilica-style naves. Inside, the high choir, carved in cedarwood in 1652, was crafted by Friars Luis Montes, Isidro Fernández Inca, and Antonio de Paz. It features images of 93 Catholic saints.

The crypts beneath the church served as a burial site.

== Architecture ==
The church's exterior features Romanesque elements, while its facade showcases the Plateresque style.

== Convent ==
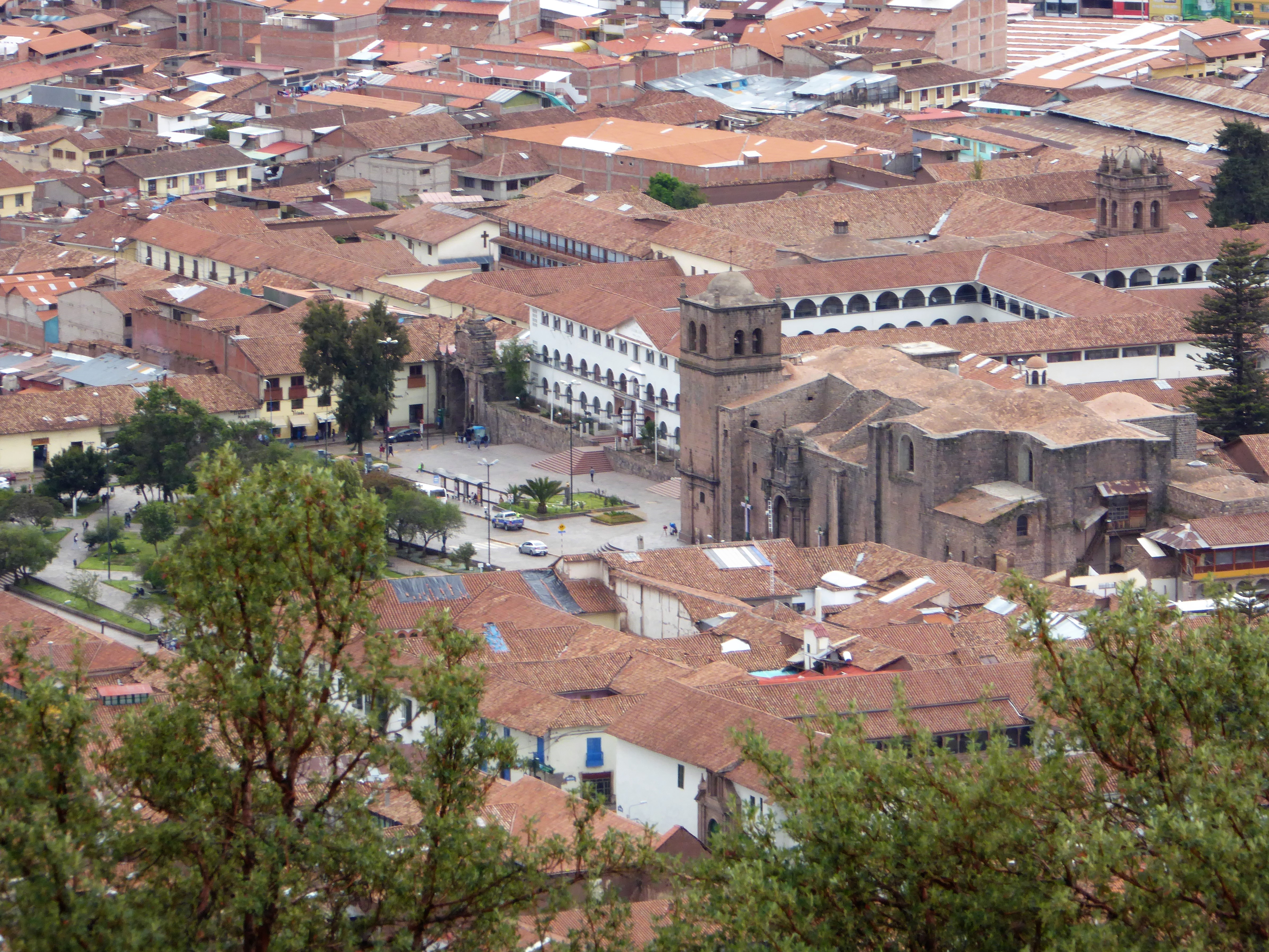
View of the church from Sacsayhuamán. The Colegio Ciencias and Arco de Santa Clara are visible in the background, along with the bell tower of Santa Clara Convent.

Adjacent to the church is the Franciscan convent, originally built with four cloisters. The first houses the chapter room and sacristy. The second served—and still serves—as the location of Colegio San Francisco de Asís (Cusco). Briefly, in the 19th century, it also housed the Colegio Educandas. The third cloister was used as a novitiate, while the fourth was demolished after being ceded to the Peruvian government for the Colegio Ciencias, which remains on the site.

The convent's museum is open to the public from Monday to Saturday. Inside the museum is a painting which depicts the "Genealogy of the Franciscan Order". Measuring 12 meters in height and 9 meters in width and painted by Juan Espinoza de los Monteros in 1655, it shows St Francis at the core of the order's "family tree", and 12 branches representing the Franciscan Order, 683 figures, 224 coats of arms, and 203 biographical inscriptions. The burial crypts can also be accessed from the museum.
