= Anthem of Cusco =

Peruvian city anthem

Himno del Cusco Qosqo yupaychana taki
English: Anthem of Cusco
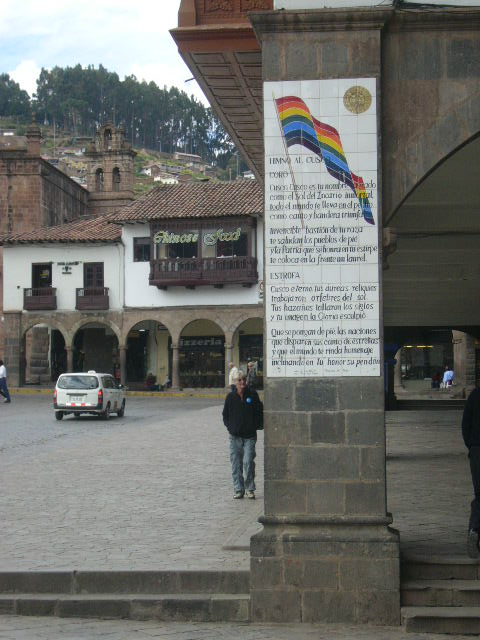
- Lyrics of the anthem of Cusco on a plaque in the Portal de Carrizos of the Plaza de Armas of Cusco
- Local anthem of Cusco, Peru
- Lyrics: Luis Nieto Miranda, 1944
- Music: Roberto Ojeda Campana, 1944
- Published: 1944; 82 years ago
- Adopted: June 11, 1984; 42 years ago

The Anthem of Cusco (Spanish: Himno del Cusco, Quechua: Qosqo yupaychana taki) is, along with the flag and the coat of arms, one of the official symbols of the city of Cusco. It was composed by Roberto Ojeda Campana, and its lyrics were written by Luis Nieto Miranda in 1944.

== History ==
The lyrics of the anthem were written in 1944 by the poet Cusqueño Luis Nieto Miranda and the music was composed by the Cusqueño musician Roberto Ojeda Campana. It was first used that same year in the celebration of the first day of Cusco. On June 11, 1984, the Provincial Council of the Municipality of Cusco, through Municipal Agreement No. 17, declared the original text of the lyrics official and unalterable, mandating that it be sung at all public events immediately after the National Anthem of Peru.

In 1991, the teachers Faustino Espinoza Navarro and Mario Mejía Waman, members of the Academia Mayor de la Lengua Quechua, translated the lyrics of the anthem into Quechua. On March 7, 2019, the Municipality of Cusco issued Ordinance No. 007-2019, declaring it of public interest and historical necessity to institute the singing of the Anthem of Cusco in Quechua at civic events in all public and private institutions of the Cusco Province.

== Lyrics ==
Spanish original

Coro:
Cusco, Cusco es tu nombre sagrado
como el sol del Incario inmortal,
todo el mundo te lleva en el pecho
como canto y bandera triunfal.
Invencible bastión de tu raza,
te saludan los pueblos de pie,
y la Patria que se honra en tu estirpe
te coloca en la frente un laurel.

Estrofa:
Cusco eterno, tus áureas reliquias
trabajaron orfebres del Sol.
Tus hazañas tallaron los siglos
y tu imagen la Gloria esculpió.
Que se pongan de pie las naciones,
que disparen su canto de estrellas
y que el mundo te rinda homenaje
inclinando en tu honor su pendón.

Quechua translation (Note: See Help:IPA/Quechua)
(Espinoza and Mejía, 1991)

Qhochuntin:
Qosqo, Qosqo willkasqan sutiyki
inkapachaq Tayta Intin hina,
teqsimuyun qhasqonpi apasunki
haylli taki unanchanta hina.
Mana llalliy sanaykiq pukaran,
llaqtakunan much’aykusunki;
Suyutaqmi aylluykiwan samisqa
mat’iykiman pilluta churan.

Yarayma:
Wiñay Qosqo, Inti qorimanyankunan
illaykikunata llank’arqan.
Haylliykikunatan pacha llaqllarqan
wankikitataq Kusi Pacha.
Llapan suyukuna sayarichun,
Ch’aska takinkuta wach’ichispa
lliu pachataq yupaychasunkiku
unanchanta k’umuykachispa.

English translation

Chorus:
Cusco, Cusco is your sacred name
like the sun of immortal Incario (Note: Incan Rule.),
everyone carries you in their heart
like a hymn and triumphal flag.
Invincible bastion of your race,
the people stand to salute you
and the homeland that is honoured in your lineage
places a laurel before you.

Verse:
Eternal Cusco, your golden relics
were worked by goldsmiths of the sun.
Your exploits carved the centuries
and your image was sculpted by glory.
Rise to your feet, nations
that shoot your songs of stars
and may the world pay you homage
tilting its banners in your honour.
