= Sol de Echenique =

Ancient Inca gold piece of the god Inti

Sun of Echenique
- Sol de Echenique, Placa de Echenique or Sol de Soles
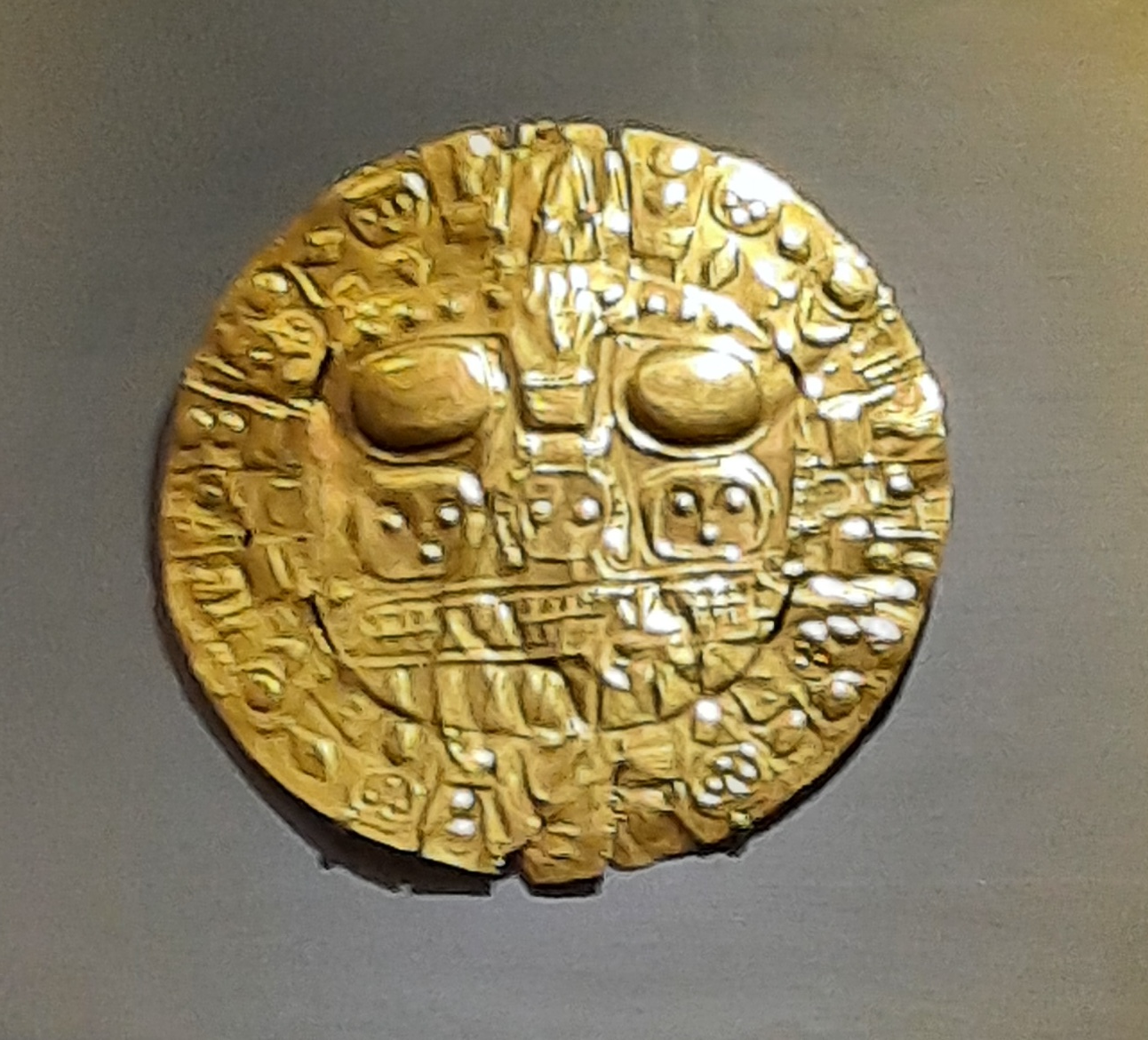
- Sol de Echenique put on display inside the Casa de Garcilaso de la Vega.
- Material: Gold (90%), silver (5%), and copper (5%)
- Height: 13.5 cm (5.3 in)
- Width: 0.5 cm (0.20 in)
- Created: Early Horizon (800 BC – 1 AD)
- Present location: Regional Historical Museum of Cusco Casa del Inca Garcilaso de la Vega, Cusco
- Culture: Inca culture

Cultural Heritage of Peru
- Official name: Placa Echenique
- Type: Movable tangible
- Criteria: Monument
- Designated: 23 June 2021; 4 years ago
- Reference no.: Pre-Hispanic
- Legal basis: R.V. Nº 149-2021-VMPCIC/MC

The Sol de Echenique or Placa de Echenique refers to a pre-Hispanic piece of gold that was given to Peruvian president José Rufino Echenique during his visit to Cusco in 1853. It was declared as Cultural Heritage of the Nation by Vice Ministerial Resolution N° 000149-2021-VMPCIC/MC.

== Description ==
Schematic image.

The Echenique Plaque is a piece of metalwork composed of 90% gold, 5% silver, and 5% copper, with a diameter of 13.5 cm. It features many figures within the central circle, as well as others that are symmetrically and systematically repeated in twenty peripheral segments. These include human faces, crescent or waning moons, rhombuses, squares, ovoids, and other symbols. The meaning of these signs is unknown, leading to speculation that they may have represented solar or lunar calendars.

== See also ==
- "A Golden Symbol of National Identity Returns to Peru". Smithsonian.
