= Coat of arms of Cusco =

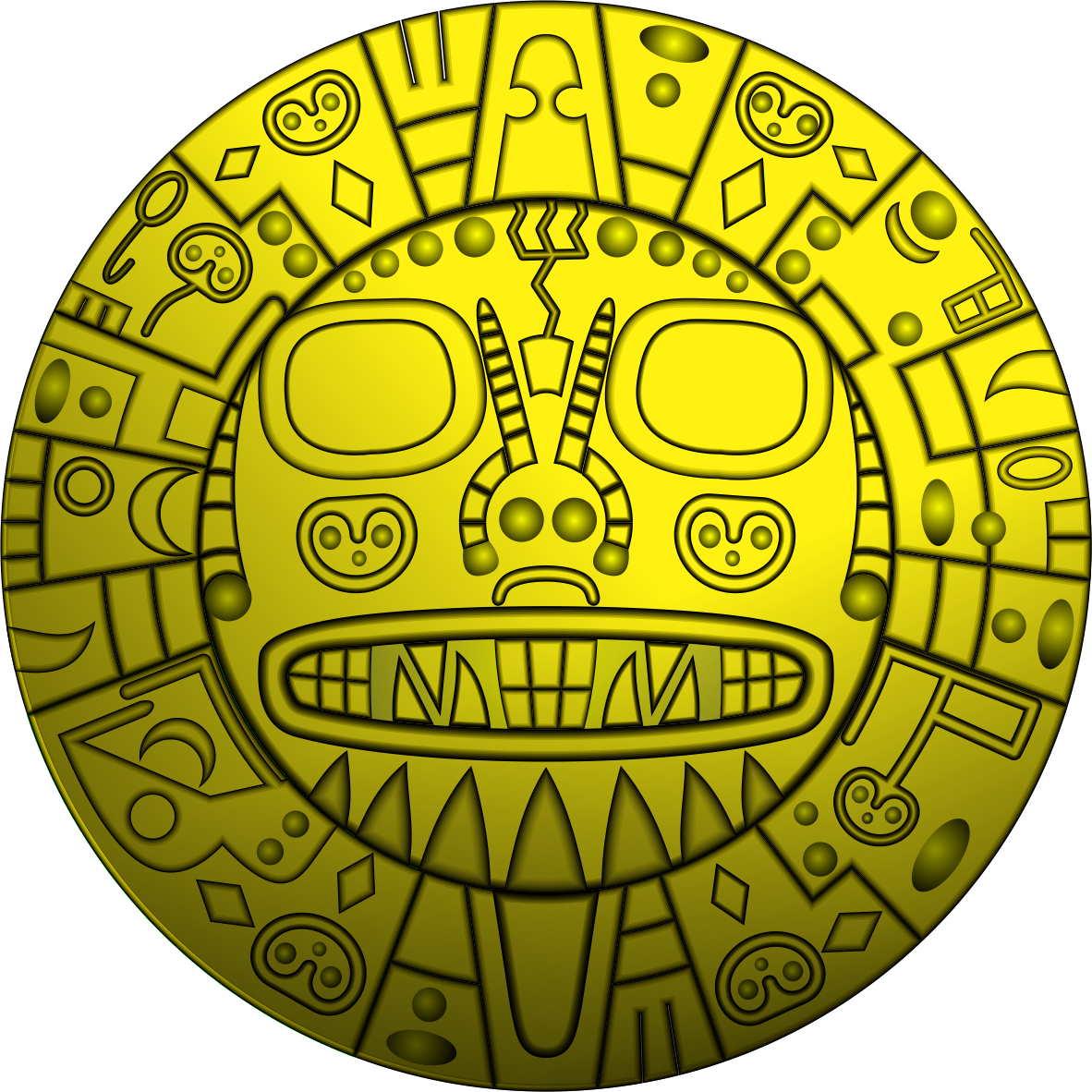
- Armiger: City of Cusco
- Adopted: June 23, 1986
- Shield: Gold disk with a stylized feline figure
- Use: Official

The coat of arms of Cusco is the official coat of arms of the city of Cusco, Peru, and is also used by the region, the province, and the district with the same name. Its current version was approved by the Provincial Council of Cusco in a solemn session on July 23, 1986.

== Coat of arms ==
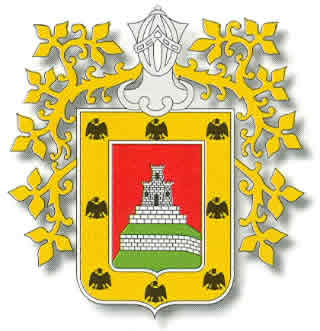
Coat of arms of 1540: In a field of gules (red), a silver castle on the fortress of Sacsayhuamán; a gold border charged with eight (3,2,2,1) black condors, and topped with a Spanish helmet

The historian and university professor from Cusco, David Vicente de Rojas Silva, cited by Angles Vargas, shows that Guamán Poma de Ayala included in his chronicle two drawings corresponding to the first and second coats of arms of Cusco during the Incan Empire. Both are quartered Iberian-style shields corresponding to two successive dynasties, the first with divine evocations and the second with royal attributes. The first shield contains a sun, a moon, a star, and the idol of Wanakaure on Paqarejtampo. The second contains the Qori-q'enque bird, a jaguar, a mascaypacha, and a double serpent.

Rojas Silva indicates that the dean Diego de Esquivel y Navia stated in his "Annals" that the city of Cusco received from Carlos I of Spain the monarch's own arms as King of Spain, which were displayed until 1540. These arms were illustrated on a banner located at the head of the council hall of the Palace of the Cabildo until 1824 when it was donated to Simón Bolívar during his visit to Cusco. The military leader sent the banner to Caracas, where it is preserved in the Historical Museum of that city. In 1534, thanks to a donation made by the city to the king to finance the war in Flanders, Carlos I granted two heraldic eagles to be included in the city's shield. These eagles, along with the fact that the city used the emperor's arms, supported the appellation of the city as the Imperial City.

On July 19, 1540, King Carlos I of Spain issued a Royal Decree qualifying Cusco as the "Most illustrious, most noble, loyal, and faithful city of Cusco, the most important and head of the kingdoms of Peru," adding the grant of a coat of arms:

In Madrid, on the 19th day of July in the year 1540, a Privilege of Arms was dispatched to the city of Cuzco in which a shield was granted, inside of which is a castle of gold on a red field, in memory of the fact that said city and its castle were conquered by force of arms in our service; and a border of eight condors, which are large birds resembling vultures found in the province of Peru, in memory of the fact that at the time the said city was conquered, these birds descended to feed on the dead who died there, which are on a gold field.- Signed by the Cardinal of Seville.- Countersigned by Sámano.- Signed by Dr. Beltrán.

These arms were later ratified by Philip II of Spain according to the decree of May 5, 1593, and also by Carlos II on January 17, 1661, and by Carlos III in 1788.

=== Variations of the shield ===
In the 16th and 17th centuries, the city's granted coat of arms underwent variations, the most notable being the change of the castle to a tower. The reasons for this change are varied, ranging from similar coats of arms granted to local residents to the intention of recreating Inca towers like those that existed in Sacsayhuamán or in the Huacaypata. Another common variation was the removal of the border of condors, though the reasons for this change are not well-known.

== Current coat of arms of Cusco ==
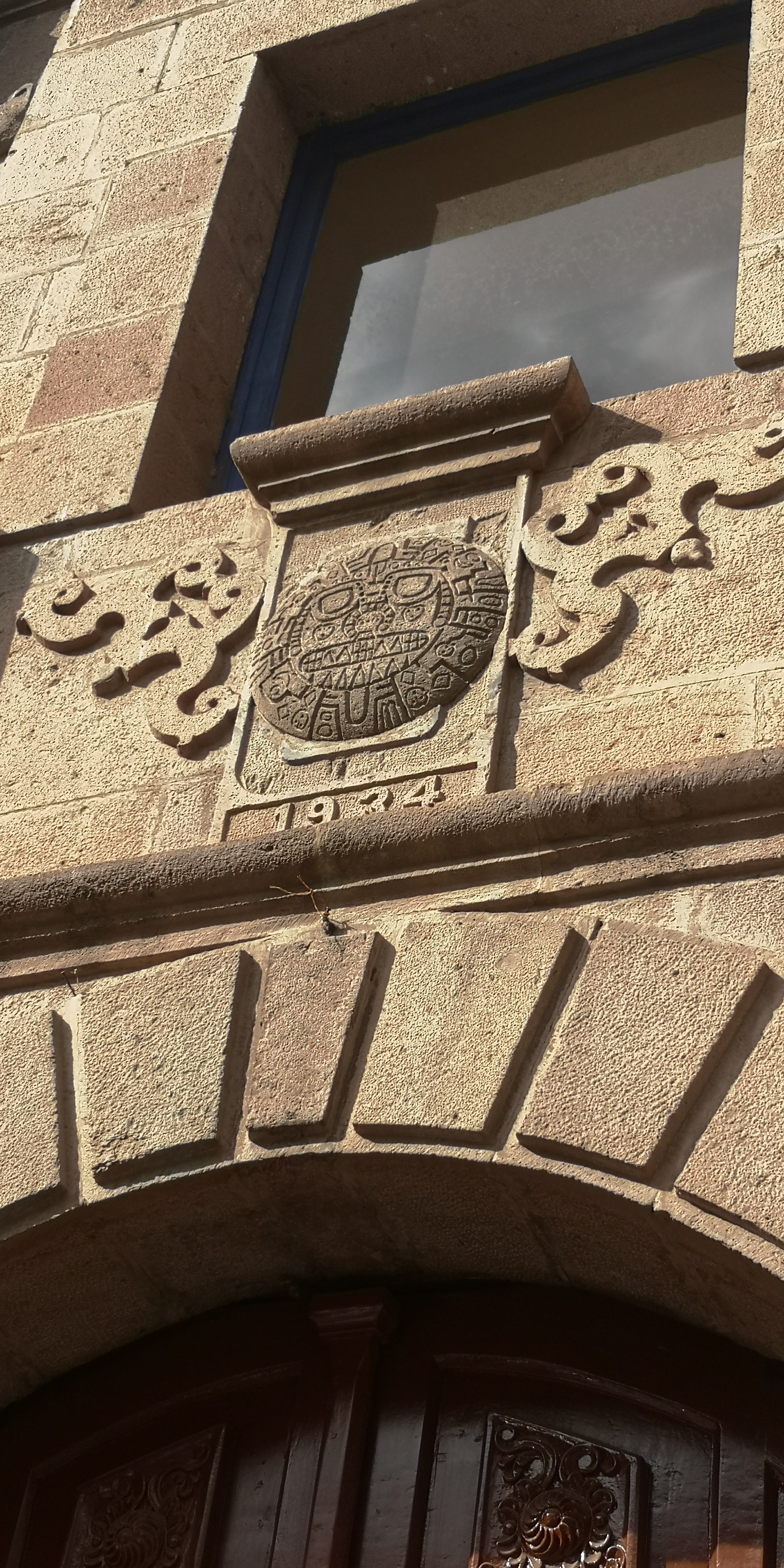
Side door of the Palace of the Cabildo displaying the new coat of arms.

In a solemn session on June 23, 1986, the Provincial Council of Cusco signed Municipal Agreement No. 063 A/MC-SG-86 along with the Mayor of Cusco, Daniel Estrada Pérez, which decided to establish the disk known as the Sol de Echenique as the official coat of arms of Cusco. Furthermore, it banned "all heraldic representations imposed by the conquest as the Coat of Arms of Cusco." This municipal agreement was published in the official newspaper El Peruano on July 2, 1986. Various historians have questioned the choice of the Sol de Echenique as the emblem of Cusco. As summarized by Cusqueño anthropologist Jorge Flores Ochoa in 1997, the plaque "is not Inca, it is not a sun... neither is it from Cusco".
