= Iglesia de la Recoleta (Peru) =

Catholic church in Cuzco, Peru

Coordinates: 13.5165°S 71.9655°W

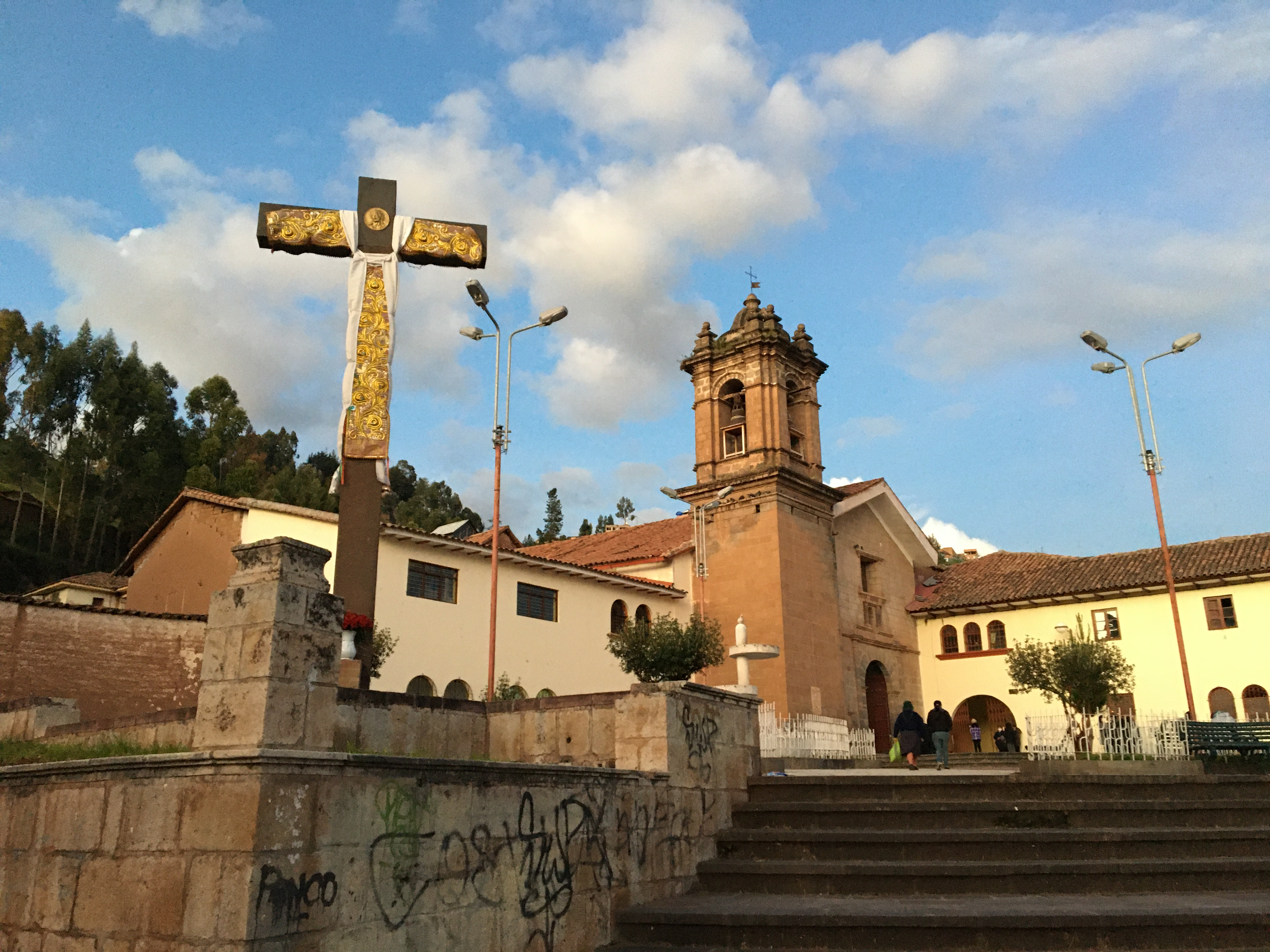

Religion
- Affiliation: Catholic
- Province: Cuzco Province
- Rite: Roman Rite
- Ownership: Catholic Church in Peru
- Governing body: Archdiocese of Cusco
- Status: Active

Location
- Location: Cuzco, Peru
- Interactive map of Iglesia de la Recoleta

Architecture
- Established: 1559
- Groundbreaking: 1559
- Completed: 1601

UNESCO World Heritage Site
- Part of: City of Cuzco
- Criteria: Cultural: iii, iv
- Reference: 273
- Inscription: 1983 (7th Session)
- Area: Latin America and the Caribbean

Cultural Heritage of Peru
- Official name: Iglesia de la Recoleta
- Type: Immovable tangible
- Criteria: Monument
- Designated: 28 December 1972; 53 years ago
- Legal basis: R.S. Nº 2900-72-ED

The Iglesia de la Recoleta is a Catholic church in Cuzco, Peru.

Since 1972 the property is part of the Monumental Zone of Cuzco, which was declared a Historical Monument of Peru. Likewise, in 1983, being part of the historic centre of the city, it is part of the central area declared by UNESCO as a World Heritage Site.

== History ==
Construction began on the church in 1559, founded by Father Francisco de Velasco at the expense of the neighbor Toribio de Bustamante. The church was completed in 1601. Next to the church a convent was built consisting of a small cloister, high and low, with a brick archway on stone columns where the religious lived.

The 1650 earthquake seriously affected the temple. For this reason, on February 3, 1688, Nicolás Huallpa, a native of Oropesa, hired Juan Tomás Tuyro Túpac to make 360 ashlars for the reconstruction of the temple tower. By contrast, the 1950 earthquake caused little damage to the building.

== Bibliography ==
- Angles Vargas, Víctor (1983). Historia del Cusco (Cusco Colonial) (in Spanish). Vol. 2. Lima: Industrialgrafica S.A.
- Kubler, George (1953). Cuzco: reconstrucción de la ciudad y restauración de sus monumentos (in Spanish). UNESCO.
