= List of Intangible Cultural Heritage elements in Peru =

Location of Peru

The United Nations Educational, Scientific and Cultural Organization (UNESCO) defines intangible cultural heritage elements as non-physical traditions and practices performed by a people. As part of a country's cultural heritage, they include celebrations, festivals, performances, oral traditions, music, and the making of handicrafts. The term "intangible cultural heritage" is formally established by the Convention for the Safeguarding of the Intangible Cultural Heritage, which was drafted in 2003 and took effect in 2006. The inscription of new heritage elements on UNESCO's Intangible Cultural Heritage Lists for protection and safeguarding is determined by the Intergovernmental Committee for the Safeguarding of Intangible Cultural Heritage, an organization established by the Convention. Peru ratified the Convention on 23 September 2005. It has served on the Intangible Cultural Heritage Committee from 2020 to 2024.

Peru registered its first two elements on the representative list in 2008. As of 2025, it had registered fifteen elements, of which two are shared with other countries.

== Intangible Cultural Heritage of Humanity ==
UNESCO's Intangible Cultural Heritage of Humanity consists of three lists.

+ Transnational element

=== Representative List ===
This list aims to represent the intangible cultural heritage of Ukraine worldwide and bring awareness to its significance.

Intangible Cultural Heritage elements recognized by UNESCO
Name	Media	Year	No.	Description (Note: The description for each element is quoted (not in full) from the criteria of inscription in the UNESCO official website.)
Oral heritage and cultural manifestations of the Zápara people + (Note: Shared with Ecuador.)		2008	00007	"The Zápara people live in a part of the Amazon jungle straddling Ecuador and Peru. The Zápara developed in what is one of the most bio-diverse areas in the world and are the last representatives of an ethno-linguistic group that included many other populations before the Spanish conquest. In the heart of Amazonia, they have elaborated an oral culture that is particularly rich as regards their understanding of the natural environment. This is demonstrated by the abundance of their vocabulary for the flora and fauna and by their medicinal practices and knowledge of the medicinal plants of the forest. This cultural heritage is expressed through their myths, rituals, artistic practices and language. Their language is the depository of traditional knowledge and of oral tradition and constitutes the memory of the people and the region."
Taquile and its Textile Art		2008	00166	"The island of Taquile located in Lake Titicaca on the Peruvian High Andean Plateau, is known for its textile art, which is produced as an everyday activity by both men and women, regardless of their age, and worn by all community members."
Huaconada, ritual dance of Mito		2010	00390	"Huaconada is a ritual dance performed in the village of Mito in the province of Concepción in the central Peruvian Andes. Every year, on the first three days of January, masked men known as huacones perform a choreographed series of dances in the centre of the town. The huacones represent the former council of elders, and for the duration of Huaconada they become the town's highest authority."
Scissors dance		2010	00391	"The scissors dance is performed by inhabitants of Quechua villages and communities in the south-central Andes of Peru, and now in urban settings. This competitive ritual dance is performed during dry months coinciding with the main phases of the agricultural calendar. The scissors dance takes its name from the pair of polished iron rods, resembling scissors blades, wielded by each dancer in his right hand. Together with a violinist and a harpist, a dancer forms a cuadrilla (team) that represents a given village or community."
Pilgrimage to the sanctuary of the Lord of Qoyllurit'i		2011	00567	"The Pilgrimage to the sanctuary of the Lord of Qoyllurit'i combines elements from Catholicism and worship of pre-Hispanic nature deities. It begins fifty-eight days after the Christian celebration of Easter Sunday, when 90,000 people from around Cusco travel to the sanctuary, located in Sinakara hollow. Pilgrims are divided into eight 'nations' corresponding to their villages of origin: Paucartambo, Quispicanchi, Canchis, Acomayo, Paruro, Tawantinsuyo, Anta and Urubamba."
Knowledge, skills and rituals related to the annual renewal of the Q'eswachaka bridge		2013	00594	"The Q'eswachaka bridge is a rope suspension bridge over a gorge of the Apurimac River in the southern Andes. It is renewed every year, using traditional Inca techniques and raw materials. The Quechua-speaking peasant communities of Huinchiri, Chaupibanda, Choccayhua and Ccollana Quehue see it as a means of strengthening their social links and not simply as a transport route. The bridge is considered a sacred expression of the communities' bond with nature, tradition and history, and the annual renewal is accompanied by ritual ceremonies."
Festivity of Virgen de la Candelaria of Puno		2014	00956	"The Festivity of Virgen de la Candelaria, celebrated each February in the city of Puno, includes activities of religious, festive and cultural character that draw on Catholic traditions and symbolic elements of the Andean worldview. The main festival commences at the beginning of the month with a daybreak mass, followed by an ancient purification ceremony. A liturgical act the next morning leads into a religious procession, as the image of the Virgin is carried aloft along the streets accompanied by traditional music and dancing. The festival continues with two contests that attract numerous groups gathering several thousand dancers and musicians from across the region."
Wititi dance of the Colca Valley		2015	01056	"The Wititi dance of the Colca Valley is a traditional folk dance associated with the beginning of adult life. It takes the form of a courtship ritual and is typically performed by young people during religious festivities celebrated throughout the rainy season. It is danced in troupes with rows of male and female couples performing a variety of steps to the beat of a band. Female dancers wear garments finely embroidered with colourful natural motifs and distinctive hats, while male dancers wear overlapping women's skirts, military shirts, slings and 'strong hats'."
Traditional system of Corongo's water judges		2017	01155	"The Traditional System of Corongo's Water Judges is an organizational method developed by the people of the district of Corongo in Northern Peru, embracing water management and historical memory. The system, which dates back to pre-Inca times, is primarily aimed at supplying water fairly and sustainably, which translates into proper land stewardship, thereby ensuring the existence of these two resources for future generations. The people of Corongo are the main bearers of the element since the system regulates their agricultural tasks, and the highest authority is the water judge, whose role is to manage water and organize the main festivities in Corongo."
'Hatajo de Negritos' and 'Hatajo de Pallitas' from the Peruvian south-central coastline		2019	01309	"'Hatajo de Negritos' and the 'Hatajo de Pallitas' from the Peruvian south-central coastline are two complementary expressions featuring music and singing as part of Christmas celebrations, hailing from the central department of Ica in Peru. The expressions are biblical representations of the story of the visit of a group of shepherds to the new-born baby Jesus and the arrival of the Wise Men. Both expressions combine pre-Hispanic Andean values with the European Catholicism and rhythmical inheritance of African descendants arriving in the Americas in colonial times."
Pottery-related values, knowledge, lore and practices of the Awajún people		2021	01557	"The Awajún people of northern Peru view pottery as an example of their harmonious relationship with nature. The pottery preparation process comprises five stages: the collection of materials, modelling, firing, decorating and finishing. Each stage of the process has a meaning and associated values that are told in the people's oral traditions. The process also entails the necessary skills and knowledge to create and decorate the pots. Artisans use specific tools, including grinding and polishing stones, a wooden board, a modelling tool and a paint brush made of human hair. The pots are decorated with geometrical patterns inspired by elements of nature such as plants, animals, mountains and stars. They are used for cooking, drinking, eating and serving food, as well as for rituals and ceremonies. "
Practices and meanings associated with the preparation and consumption of ceviche, an expression of Peruvian traditional cuisine		2023	01952	"Ceviche is a traditional dish in Peru prepared with raw fish marinated in lemon, seasoned with chili pepper and salt and accompanied with locally grown produce. The dish is consumed both on a daily basis and during festivities. It is associated with moments of celebration and social gathering, as well as with ritual celebrations, particularly the festivity of Saint Peter, patron saint of artisanal fishers. Ceviche can be made at home or sold in traditional spaces such as cevicherías, where the work of traditional female cooks stands out. Its preparation and consumption entail specific practices, knowledge and meanings at each stage, from fishing to cultivating the ingredients and preparing the dish. As recipes vary from one region to the next, the dish also strengthens regional cultural identity."
Sarawja, Aimara music and dance of Moquegua		2025	02071	"Sarawja, also known as Sarawjatana, is practiced in the valleys of Ticsani and San Felipe, in the Andean region of Moquegua. This annual celebration is held after the Catholic Holy Week, marking the end of the rainy season and the beginning of the harvest. It features a ritual dance performance by dance groups known as ‘ruedas’, or wheels. The dancers move in concentric circles or parallel rows, mimicking the flight patterns of ‘kiwlas’, Andean birds. The women wear a traditional wool garment and move in fast circles, while men accompany their movements by whistling, stomping and playing instruments. The dance groups, which are made up of married couples and their friends, travel from village to village to perform, and are welcomed with local food and products."

=== Need of Urgent Safeguarding ===
This list covers elements that are endangered and thus require appropriate safeguarding.

Name	Year	No.	Description
Esuwa, Harakbut sung prayers of Peru's Wachiperi people	2011	00531	"The Wachiperi are an indigenous ethnic group speaking the Harakbut language and living in Peru's southern Amazon tropical forest. The Esuwa or sung prayer is an expression of Wachiperi religious myths, performed for healing or as part of traditional ceremonies such as the drinking of masato, a traditional beverage made of fermented manioc, and the initiation of new Esuwa singers. According to oral tradition, the Esuwa songs were learned directly from the forest's animals, and are sung to summon nature spirits to help to alleviate illness or discomfort or promote well-being."

=== Register of Good Safeguarding Practices ===
This list accredits programs and projects that safeguard intangible cultural heritage and express the principles of the Convention.

Name	Year	No.	Description
Safeguarding intangible cultural heritage of Aymara communities in Bolivia, Chile and Peru + (Note: Shared with Bolivia and Chile.)	2009	00299	"The proposed sub-regional project aims at developing safeguarding measures to ensure the viability of the oral expressions, music and traditional knowledge (textile art and agricultural technologies) of the Aymara communities of Bolivia (La Paz-Oruro-Potosí), Chile (Tarapacá-Arica-Parinacota-Antofagasta) and Peru (Tacna-Puno-Moquegua). The activities, planned for implementation over the course of a five-year project, are: (i) identifying and inventorying the traditional knowledge and oral traditions of Aymara communities in the selected areas, (ii) strengthening language as a vehicle for transmission of the intangible cultural heritage through formal and non-formal education, (iii) promoting and disseminating Aymara oral and musical expressions and (iv) reinforcing traditional knowledge related to the production of textile arts and traditional agricultural techniques."

== See also ==
- List of World Heritage Sites in Peru
