= Casa Concha =

- Museo Machu Picchu Casa Concha
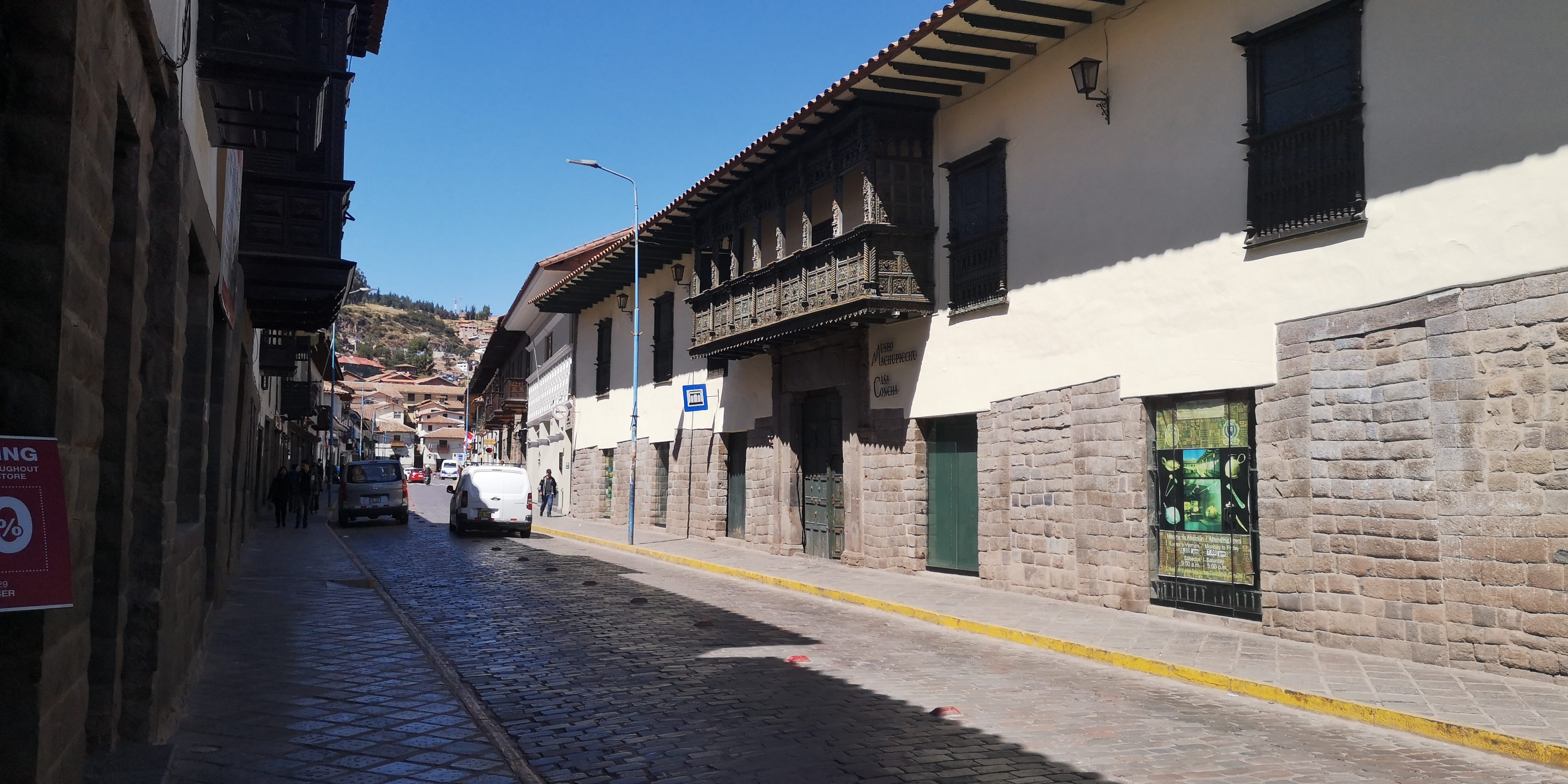
- Current facade of the museum
- Established: Inca Empire
- Location: Cusco, Peru
- Coordinates: 13°31′02.38″S 71°58′36.77″W
- Type: Historic house, museum
- Owner: National University of San Antonio Abad of Cusco
- Website: www.museomachupicchu.com

UNESCO World Heritage Site
- Part of: City of Cuzco
- Criteria: Cultural: iii, iv
- Reference: 273
- Inscription: 1983 (7th Session)
- Area: Latin America and the Caribbean

Cultural Heritage of Peru
- Official name: Casa Concha
- Type: Immovable tangible
- Criteria: Monument
- Designated: 6 March 2002; 24 years ago
- Legal basis: R.D.N. Nº 139/INC-2002

Casa Concha is a colonial-era house located in Cusco, Peru. Its name is attributed to one of its former owners, possibly Martín de la Concha y Jara, governor and intendant of Cusco around 1812, his descendant Martín Concha y Cámara, or even José Santiago Concha y Salvatierra, Marquess of Casa Concha.

Since 1972, the building has been part of the Monumental Zone of Cusco and was declared a Historic Monument of Peru. In 1983, as part of Cusco's historic center, it was included in the UNESCO World Heritage Site listing.

== History ==
The house was built on the site known as Puka Marka during the Inca Empire, where the palace of Túpac Inca Yupanqui, son of Pachacuti, once stood. After the Spanish conquest, the property changed hands multiple times. One of its earliest owners was Diego de Santiago. In 1533, the land was transferred to General Pedro Alonso Hinojosa, whose heirs later sold it to Pedro Alonso Carrasco in 1600. Subsequent owners included Diego López de Barrionuevo and Manuel Plácido Berriozábal. In 1710, the current colonial house was built, featuring mural paintings, carved wooden decorations, a stone entrance, and Baroque-style balconies.

During the 17th century, the house belonged to José de Santiago Concha, an oidor of the Real Audiencia of Lima, interim President of the Real Audiencia of Santiago, and Superintendent General of the Huancavelica mines. In 1778, Philip V of Spain granted him the title of Marquess of Casa Concha, later inherited by his grandson José de Santiago Concha y Traslaviña.

For many years, the building housed the Cusco Police Station. In 2001, President Valentín Paniagua transferred ownership to the National University of San Antonio Abad of Cusco for cultural purposes. Since 2011, it has been home to the Machu Picchu Museum.

== Architecture ==
The house was constructed over Inca walls, where colonial-era doorways were later opened.

Externally, it features a stone facade from the Inca period that was later altered to include colonial-era doorways. The main entrance, built in the 17th century, includes a monolithic stone doorway with concave carved figures. Above this, a Baroque-style balcony with seven sections was added. The inner courtyard is surrounded by archways on three sides.

The main entrance, with its carved stone portal, leads to a hallway with a stone arch that opens into the central courtyard, surrounded by three arcaded galleries. The southwest wing features a cantilevered corridor supported by brackets on the second level. A secondary passageway, featuring semicircular stone arches, leads to a second and third courtyard. This section has a wooden turnstile door and underwent modifications over time, losing two of its original wings.

The staircase is a "box-type" with a return layout. The roof structure follows a pair-and-knuckle system, and the house retains various mural paintings and wooden ceilings in several rooms. The main hall contains an intricately carved wooden ceiling and two large stone fireplaces embedded in adobe walls.
