= Cementerio General de La Almudena =

Cemetery in Cuzco, Peru

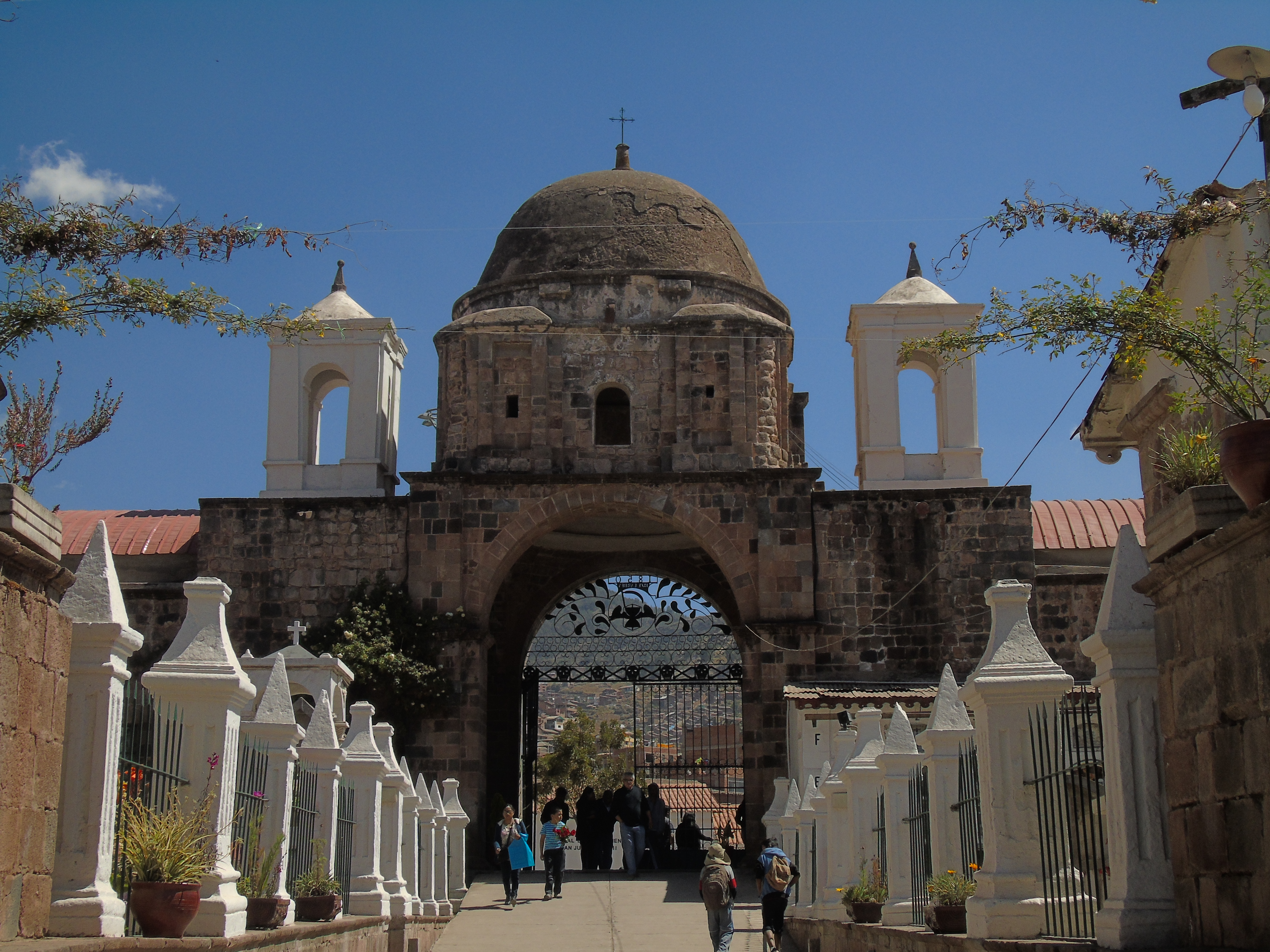
- Interactive map of Cementerio General de La Almudena

Details
- Established: 1850
- Location: Cuzco
- Coordinates: 13°31′39″S 71°59′14″W
- Type: Public
- Owned by: Sociedad de Beneficencia del Cusco
- Find a Grave: 2749004

UNESCO World Heritage Site
- Part of: City of Cuzco
- Criteria: Cultural: iii, iv
- Reference: 273
- Inscription: 1983 (7th Session)
- Area: Latin America and the Caribbean

Cultural Heritage of Peru
- Official name: Antiguo Cementerio de Almudena (actual Cementerio General de la Almudena)
- Type: Immovable tangible
- Criteria: Monument
- Designated: 1 December 2010; 15 years ago
- Legal basis: R.V. Nº 182-2010-VMPCIC-MC

The Cementerio General de La Almudena is a cemetery in Santiago District, Cuzco, Peru. It is located in the Plazoleta de la Almudena, where there is also the church and convent of the Bethlehemites (formerly a Hospital). In the 19th century, there was also a mental hospital and a prison in this area. Currently, in addition to the cemetery, in this square are the Hogar Casa Acogida that cares for adolescent women victims of crimes of human trafficking, and the Health Hospital Mental San Juan Pablo II, both administered by the Charity of Cuzco.

Since 2010 the property was declared by the Ministry of Culture as part of the Cultural heritage of Peru. Also, in 1983, being part of the historic centre of the city of Cuzco, it is part of the central area declared by UNESCO as a World Heritage Site.

== History ==
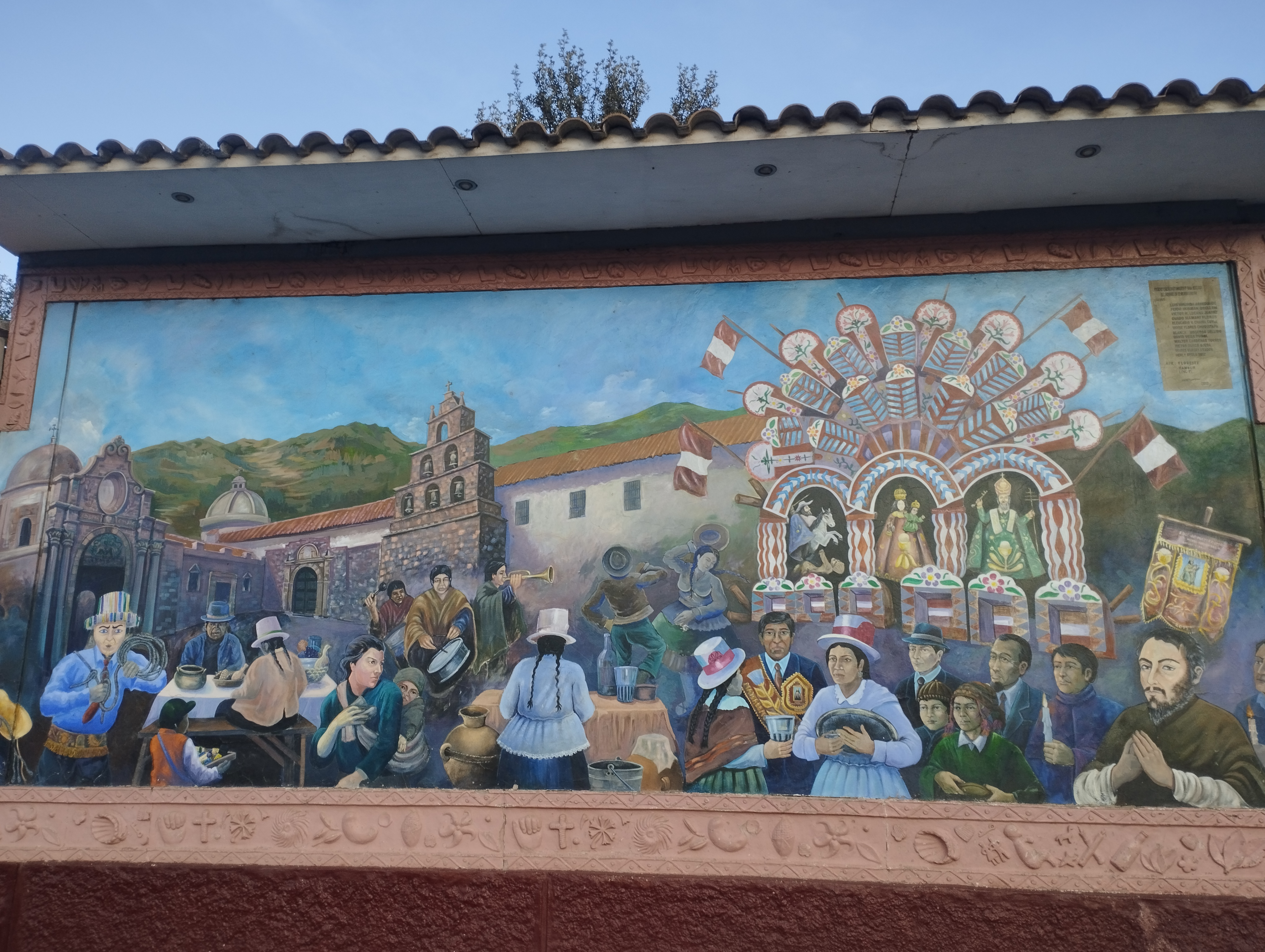
Mural on one of the exterior walls of the cemetery.

The cemetery was built between 1846 and 1850 during the government of Ramón Castilla, who had ordered the construction of a cemetery in the city of Cuzco for health reasons since until then, and since the colony, burials were carried out in the cellars of the city's churches. The prefect of the city, José Medina, chose the area where the colonial hospital of the Bethlehemites and the Templo de la Almudena stood, which were far from the center of the city. Next to these buildings there was a small colonial cemetery that was already used as a cemetery for said hospital.

For the construction of the cemetery, material from the Convent of San Agustín was used, which was destroyed with cannon fire by order of Agustín Gamarra. Opposite the Plazoleta de la Almudena stands the stone façade of the cemetery. This presents Greek columns that correspond to a representation of neoclassical architecture. The entrance shows a semicircular arch with protruding imposts at the start of the arch, flanked by a double column with a Corinthian capital. At the top of the narthex rises a semicircular dome. The frontispiece of the cemetery also has windows and portals on both sides that overlook other rooms that served as a wake and morgue. It is also pointed out that these walls were used during the 19th century by firing squads.

In the east wing of the cemetery are the oldest mausoleums. The oldest dates from 1857 and the identity of the deceased is unknown because the inscriptions have already been erased by time. In this mausoleum there are traces of black candles due to their use in magical-religious rites and practices of witchcraft and satanism. Close to this is the Cruz Mayor, common in ancient cemeteries in Peru. In this cemetery, the cross is carved and is used so that those who cannot find the place where their loved one is buried can leave their offerings and prayers on it. Among the mausoleums, the one that corresponds to the Mendivil family stands out, whose ornaments are representations of the wise men and musketeer angels in the typical form of Mendívil crafts, with elongated necks and tiny frames. In the same sector is the Central Chapel of Santo Roma, which is a construction prior to the same cemetery and which is behind the Temple of the Almudena. It was built on January 27, 1802, by Bishop Bartolomé María de las Heras. Initially, this chapel housed the funeral rites of the cemetery. At present it is used as an incinerator for bodies.

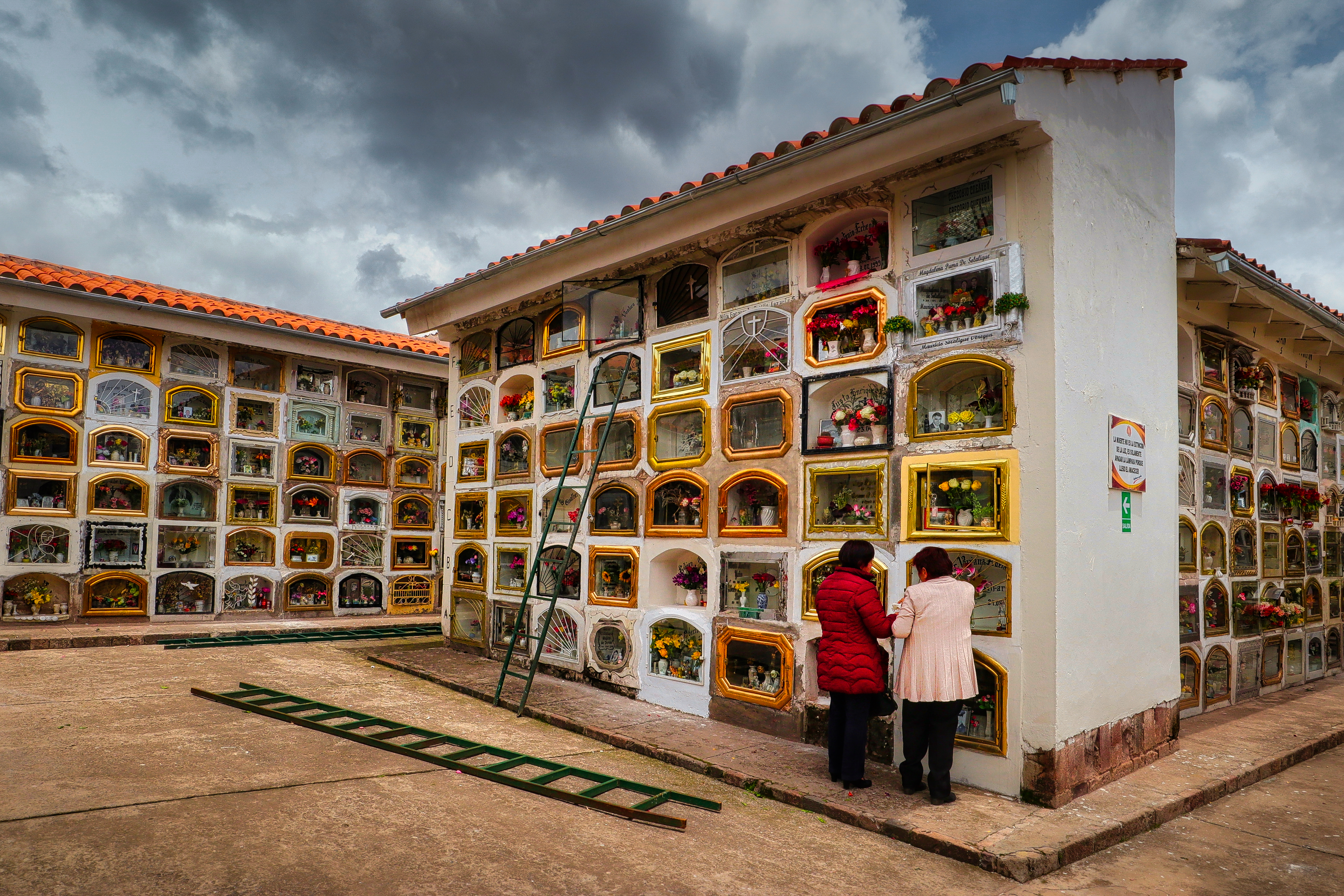
Two women visit shadowbox graves at Almudena Cemetery in Cusco

Finally, also in the eastern sector, there is the exit to the cemetery that was formerly used by people with fewer resources and that, since 2001, was modified for the construction of modern mausoleums and new pavilions. A characteristic of this cemetery that differentiates it from the rest of the country is the use of gold and silver metals in the tombstones, unlike the plaster or marble that is usual in the rest of Peru. Also, in the possibility that the tombstones can be decorated by the family with various miniatures, which shows a lot of the idiosyncrasy of each family.

== Notable burials ==
- Serapio Calderón (1843–1922), president of Peru in 1904
- Daniel Estrada Pérez (1947–2003), Mayor of Cusco and congressman
- Clorinda Matto de Turner (1852-1909), writer
- Martín Chambi (1891-1973), photographer
