= Carlos Chacón Galindo =

Peruvian politician (1934–2021)

Provincial Mayor of Cusco Province
- In office 1 January 1967 – 31 December 1969
- Preceded by: Alfredo Díaz Quintanilla
- Succeeded by: Military rule
- In office 1 January 1987 – 31 December 1989
- Preceded by: Daniel Estrada
- Succeeded by: Daniel Estrada

Personal details
- Born: 12 December 1934; Cusco, Peru
- Died: 17 February 2021 (aged 86); Lima, Peru
- Political party: Alliance for Progress

Carlos Chacón Galindo (12 December 1934 – 17 February 2021) was a Peruvian politician. He served as Provincial Mayor for Cusco Province from 1967 to 1969 and again from 1987 to 1989.

== Biography ==
Galindo studied at the Colegio Nacional de Ciencias y Artes del Cuzco and the National University of Saint Anthony the Abbot in Cuzco, where he served as the Dean of the College of Agriculture and Livestock from 1969 to 1974. He also worked for the César Vallejo University beginning in the mid-2000s.

In the 1966 Cusco municipal elections, Galindo ran for Provincial Mayor of Cusco Province as part of the coalition between the American Popular Revolutionary Alliance and the Odriist National Union, which he won with 43.299% of the vote. Twenty years later, he ran again for the seat of Provincial Mayor in the 1986 Cuzco municipal elections. He won the seat once again, defeating United Left candidate Daniel Estrada. In the 1990 Peruvian general election, he ran for the Congress of the Republic of Peru, but failed to earn a seat after receiving only 1369 votes. In 2006, he ran for Congress again, hoping to represent the Department of Cuzco, but was again defeated after earning 950 votes.

Carlos Chacón Galindo died in Lima on 17 February 2021 at the age of 86.
