= List of World Heritage Sites in Peru =

Locations of World Heritage Sites in Peru (red for cultural, green for natural, blue for mixed). The sites of the Qhapaq Ñan, with 54 locations in Peru, are not shown.

The United Nations Educational, Scientific and Cultural Organization (UNESCO) World Heritage Sites are places of importance to cultural or natural heritage as described in the UNESCO World Heritage Convention, established in 1972. Peru ratified the convention on February 24, 1982, making its historical sites eligible for inclusion on the list.

As of 2021, Peru has 13 sites on the World Heritage List. The first sites within Peru were inscribed on the list at the 7th Session of the World Heritage Committee, held in Florence, Italy in 1983: "City of Cusco" and the "Historic Sanctuary of Machu Picchu". Nine sites are listed as cultural sites, two as natural, and two as mixed, meeting both cultural and natural selection criteria, as determined by the organization's selection criteria. The site Chan Chan Archaeological Zone was inscribed to the list in 1986 and immediately placed on the List of World Heritage in Danger as the adobe constructions are easily damaged by heavy rain and erosion. The Qhapaq Ñan, Andean Road System site is a transnational site, also shared with Argentina, Bolivia, Chile, Colombia, and Ecuador. In addition, there are eight sites on the tentative list.

== World Heritage Sites ==
UNESCO lists sites under ten criteria; each entry must meet at least one of the criteria. Criteria i through vi are cultural, and vii through x are natural.

* Transnational site
† In danger

Site	Image	Location (region)	Year listed	UNESCO data	Description
City of Cuzco	Cathedral of Cuzco	Cuzco	1983	273; iii, iv (cultural)	Cuzco was developed by the Inca king Pachacutec, who ruled the Kingdom of Cuzco as it expanded to become the Inca Empire in the 15th century. It became the most important city of the Inca Empire, divided into distinct areas for religious and administrative use, and surrounded by an organized system of agriculture, artisan, and industrial uses. The Spanish conquered the empire in the 16th century. They built Baroque churches and buildings over the Inca ruins. Cuzco is one of the highest cities in the world.
Historic Sanctuary of Machu Picchu	Machu Picchu	Cuzco	1983	274; i, iii, vii, ix (mixed)	At 2,340 metres (7,680 ft) above sea level, the site of Machu Picchu was constructed as an expansive mountain estate around the middle of the 15th century, and abandoned approximately 100 years later. It includes walls, terraces, and buildings constructed from rock that is earthquake-resistant. The city was home to about 1,200 people, mostly priests, women, and children. It was left abandoned prior to the Spanish arrival in Cuzco most likely due to smallpox.
Chavín (Archaeological Site)	Chavín de Huantar	Ancash	1985	330; iii (cultural)	The Chavín culture developed in the Andean highlands between 1500 and 300 BC. The site is now known as Chavín de Huantar, which served as the center. The site consists of a complex of terraces and squares cut from rock. It is believed the Chavín were primarily a religious-based society whose influence resulted from their culture, rather than aggressive expansion.
Huascarán National Park	Taulliraju Mountain in Huascarán National Park	Ancash	1985	333; vii, viii (natural)	Huascarán National Park is located in the Cordillera Blanca mountain range of the Andes. It surrounds Huascarán, the tallest peak in Peru. The physical environment includes glaciers, ravines, and lakes, while the park is home to several regional animal species. The national park is uninhabited, but native llamas and alpacas graze in the lowlands.
Chan Chan Archaeological Zone†	Chan Chan	La Libertad	1986	366; i, iii (cultural)	The city of Chan Chan served as the capital of the Chimú culture. The Chimú kingdom developed along the coast of northern Peru. Chan Chan is divided into nine walled units indicating political and social division. The Chimú were conquered by the Inca in 1470. The site was listed to the List of World Heritage in Danger when it was first inscribed, as the adobe constructions are easily damaged by heavy rain and erosion.
Manu National Park	Manu National Park	Cuzco	1987	402; ix, x (natural)	The park spreads over 1,500,000 hectares (5,800 sq mi) and from 150 metres (490 ft) to 4,200 metres (13,800 ft) above sea-level. Manu is home to 1,000 bird species, over 200 species of mammals (100 of which are bats), and over 15,000 species of flowering plants. Jaguars have been seen throughout the national park. The giant otter and giant armadillo are just a few rare species found in the national park. Prior to being recognized as a World Heritage Site in 1987, it was designated as a biosphere reserve in 1977.
Historic Centre of Lima	Plaza de Armas, Lima	Lima Province^{1}	1988	500; iv (cultural)	Lima was founded by Francisco Pizarro in 1535 as La Ciudad de los Reyes (City of the Kings). Until the middle of the 18th century, it was the most important city in Spanish South America. The architecture and decoration combine the style of both the local population and Europe, such as in the Monastery of San Francisco. Also, hospitals, schools and universities were built. San Marcos University was built in 1551. The city's social and cultural life was organized within these places, giving Lima a convent image which characterized its urban profile until half of the 20th century.
Rio Abiseo National Park	Cataratas del Breo	San Martín	1990	548; iii, vii, ix, x (mixed)	The park was created in 1983 in order to protect the region's rainforest habitat. The park is home to many endemic species such as the yellow-tailed woolly monkey, which was thought to be extinct. The site is also listed under cultural criteria, as over 30 Pre-Columbian sites have been discovered since 1985.
Lines and Geoglyphs of Nazca and Pampas de Jumana	Nazca monkey	Ica	1994	700; i, iii, iv (cultural)	The large designs in the Nazca Desert are believed to have been created by the Nazca culture between 400 and 650 AD. They were created by scratching lines into the ground surface. Designs include animals such as a monkey and hummingbird, plants, and geographic shapes on a large scale. It is believed that they served a ritualistic purpose.
Historical Centre of the City of Arequipa	Cathedral of Arequipa	Arequipa	2000	1016; i, iv (cultural)	Arequipa is built primarily on top of sillar, a white volcanic rock, the product of nearby El Misti volcano. The architecture of the city is known for its combination of traditional indigenous styles with the new techniques of the European colonial settlers.
Sacred City of Caral-Supe	Caral	Lima	2009	1269; ii, iii, iv (cultural)	The archaeological site belonged to the Norte Chico civilization that inhabited the area during the Late Archaic period. Caral is one of 18 complex urban settlements in the region and features many monuments and pyramids. Caral is the earliest known American settlement. A quipu recovered from the site demonstrates its influence on later Andean cultures.
Qhapaq Ñan, Andean Road System*	Inca trail	several regions	2014	1459; ii, iii, iv, vi (cultural)	The site covers an extensive road system in the Andes built over several centuries by the Incas, partly based on pre-Inca infrastructure. The system spans over more than 6,000 kilometres (3,700 mi) running through various geographical terrains – the coast, rainforests, valleys, deserts, and mountainous regions above 6,000 metres (20,000 ft) of altitude. The site includes 273 component sites in six countries: Argentina, Bolivia, Chile, Colombia, Ecuador, and Peru.
Chankillo Archaeoastronomical Complex	Chankillo	Ancash	2021	1624; i, iv (cultural)	The Chankillo Archaeoastronomical Complex is a prehistoric site (250–200 BC), located in the Casma Valley, and comprises a set of constructions that functioned as a calendrical instrument. Possibly dedicated to a solar cult, the site was used to define dates throughout the year utilizing the sun. The complex is able to mark out the solstices, the equinoxes, and all the dates of the year with a precision of 1–2 days.

== Tentative list ==
In addition to the sites inscribed on the World Heritage list, member states can maintain a list of tentative sites that they may consider for nomination. Nominations for the World Heritage list are only accepted if the site was previously listed on the tentative list. As of 2024, Peru recorded 24 sites on its tentative list.

Site	Image	Location (region)	Year listed	UNESCO criteria	Description
Historic Center of the City of Trujillo	Freedom Monument, Trujillo	La Libertad	1996	(cultural)	-
The Historic Centre of Cajamarca	Catedral de Cajamarca	Cajamarca	2002	ii, iv (cultural)	
Lake Titicaca	Lake Titicaca	Puno	2005	ii, iii, v, vi, vii, x (mixed)	
Santa Bárbara mining complex	Huancavelica	Huancavelica	2017	ii, iv (cultural)	
Salt Mines of Maras	Maras, Cusco	Cusco	2019	iii, v (cultural)	
Baroque Temples of Collao	Lampa	Puno	2019	ii, iv (cultural)	San Francisco de Asis temple, Ayaviri; San Geronimo Temple, Asillo; Santiago apostol temple, Lampa; San Carlos Borromeo temple, Puno; San Pedro Martir Temple, Juli; Santa Cruz de Jerusalen temple, Juli; Nuestra Senora de Rosario or Santiago Apostol temple, Pomata; San Pedro Temple, Zepita
Rural Temples of Cusco		Cusco	2019	ii, iv (cultural)	
Nasca Aqueducts		Ica	2019	iii, iv (cultural)	
Archaeological Complex of Toro Muerto		Arequipa	2019	iii (cultural)	
Archaeological complex of Marcahuamachuco		La Libertad	2019	iii (cultural)	
Chachapoyas sites of the Utcubamba Valley		Amazonas	2019	iii, iv (cultural)	
Battlefield of Ayacucho		Ayacucho	2019	vi (cultural)	
Wineries and Vineyards for traditional Pisco Production		Ica	2019	ii, iv (cultural)	
Las Huaringas Lagoons		Piura	2019	v, vi (cultural)	
Peruvian Central Railway		Lima	2019	ii, iv (cultural)	
Cultural Landscape of the Sondondo Valley		Ayacucho	2019	iii, iv, vi (cultural)	
Paleontological Sites of Pisco and Camana Basins		Ica	2019	viii (natural)	
Ceremonial Centers and Forests in the La Leche Valley		Lambayeque	2019	iv, vi, x (mixed)	
Sierra del Divisor National Park		Ucayali	2019	vii, x (natural)	
Huayllay National Sanctuary		Pasco	2019	vii, viii (natural)	
Guano Islands, Islets, and Capes National Reserve System form Peru (RNSIIPG)		Lima	2019	x (natural)	
Landscape Reserve Sub Cuenca del Cotahuasi		Arequipa	2019	vii, viii (natural)	
The Coastal Lomas System of Peru		Lima	2019	ix (natural)	
Real Felipe Fortress		Callao	2023	iv (cultural)	

== See also ==
- List of Intangible Cultural Heritage elements in Peru
