= Regional Historical Museum of Cusco =

Museum in Cusco, Peru

- Museo Histórico Regional Casa del Inka Garcilaso de La Vega
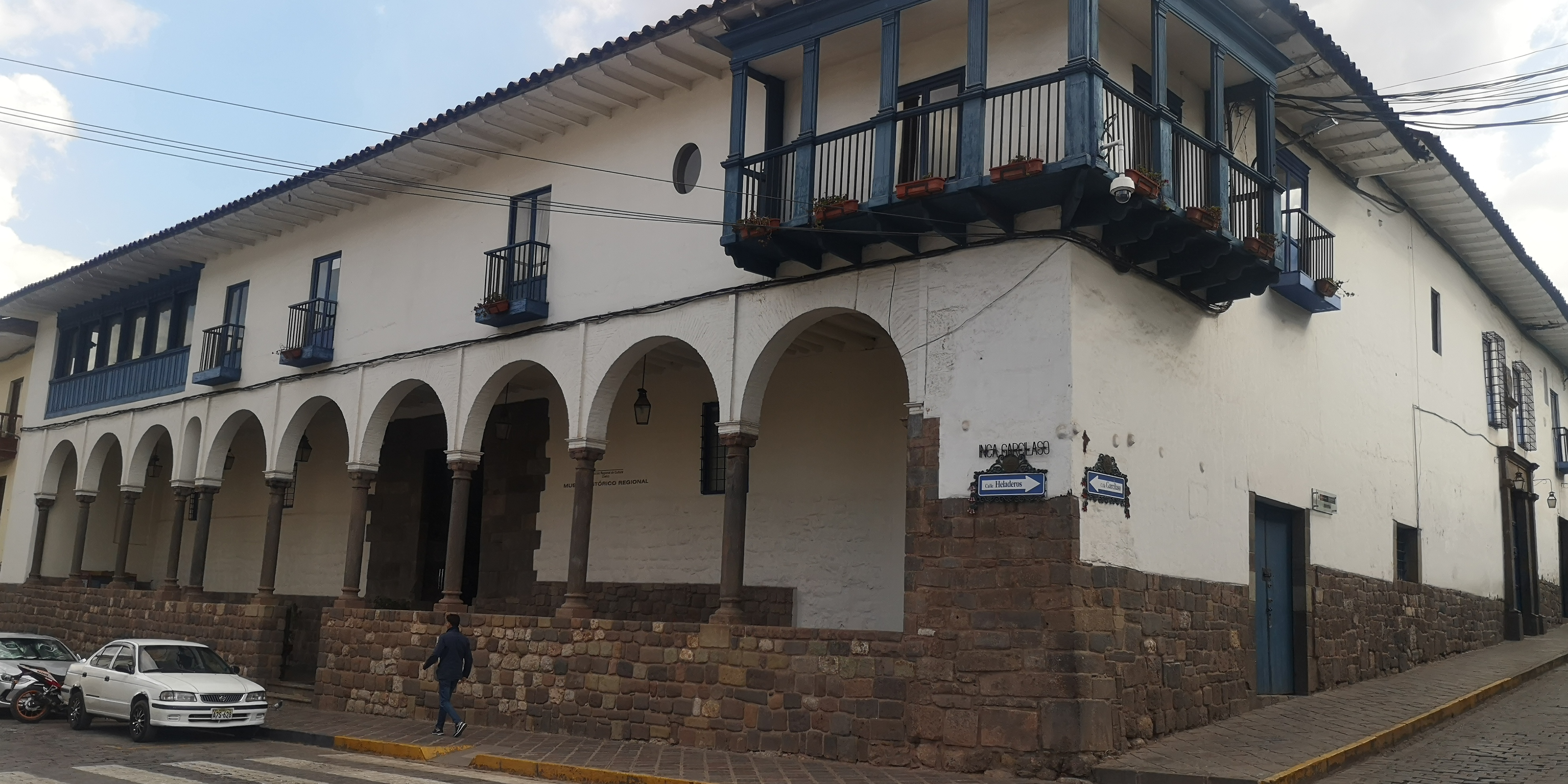
- Current facade of the museum
- Former name: Viceregal Museum of Cusco
- Established: 30 April 1946; 80 years ago
- Location: Calle Garcilaso at Heladeros, Cusco, Peru
- Coordinates: 13°31′03″S 71°58′49″W
- Type: Art museum and historic site
- Key holdings: Colonial paintings, Inca Garcilaso de la Vega memorabilia
- Collections: Ceramics, paintings, metals, textiles
- Visitors: 140,300 (2024): Ranked 3rd nationally
- Owner: Ministry of Culture of Peru
- Website: museogarcilaso.culturacusco.gob.pe/english/index.php

UNESCO World Heritage Site
- Part of: City of Cuzco
- Criteria: Cultural: iii, iv
- Reference: 273
- Inscription: 1983 (7th Session)
- Area: Latin America and the Caribbean

Cultural Heritage of Peru
- Official name: Casa de Garcilaso de La Vega
- Type: Immovable tangible
- Criteria: Monument
- Designated: 9 December 1957; 68 years ago
- Legal basis: R.S. Nº 485-1957

The Regional Historical Museum of Cusco (Spanish: Museo Histórico Regional del Cuzco) is a museum located in the city of Cusco, in the Cusco Region of Peru.

It is located in the house where the Cusco chronicler Inca Garcilaso de la Vega was born and lived. In 1946, it was converted into a museum.

The collection consists of ceramics, paintings, metals, and textiles. It has 13 rooms; on the first level, it is in the process of implementation, housing paleontological and archaeological objects from the pre-Hispanic period, while on the second level, assets from the viceregal, republican, and contemporary periods are exhibited. On January 6, 2014, two rooms referring to the Prehistoric and Pre-Hispanic periods were inaugurated.

== See also ==
- Plaza Regocijo
