= Templo de la Sagrada Familia, Cusco =

Templo de la Sagrada Familia
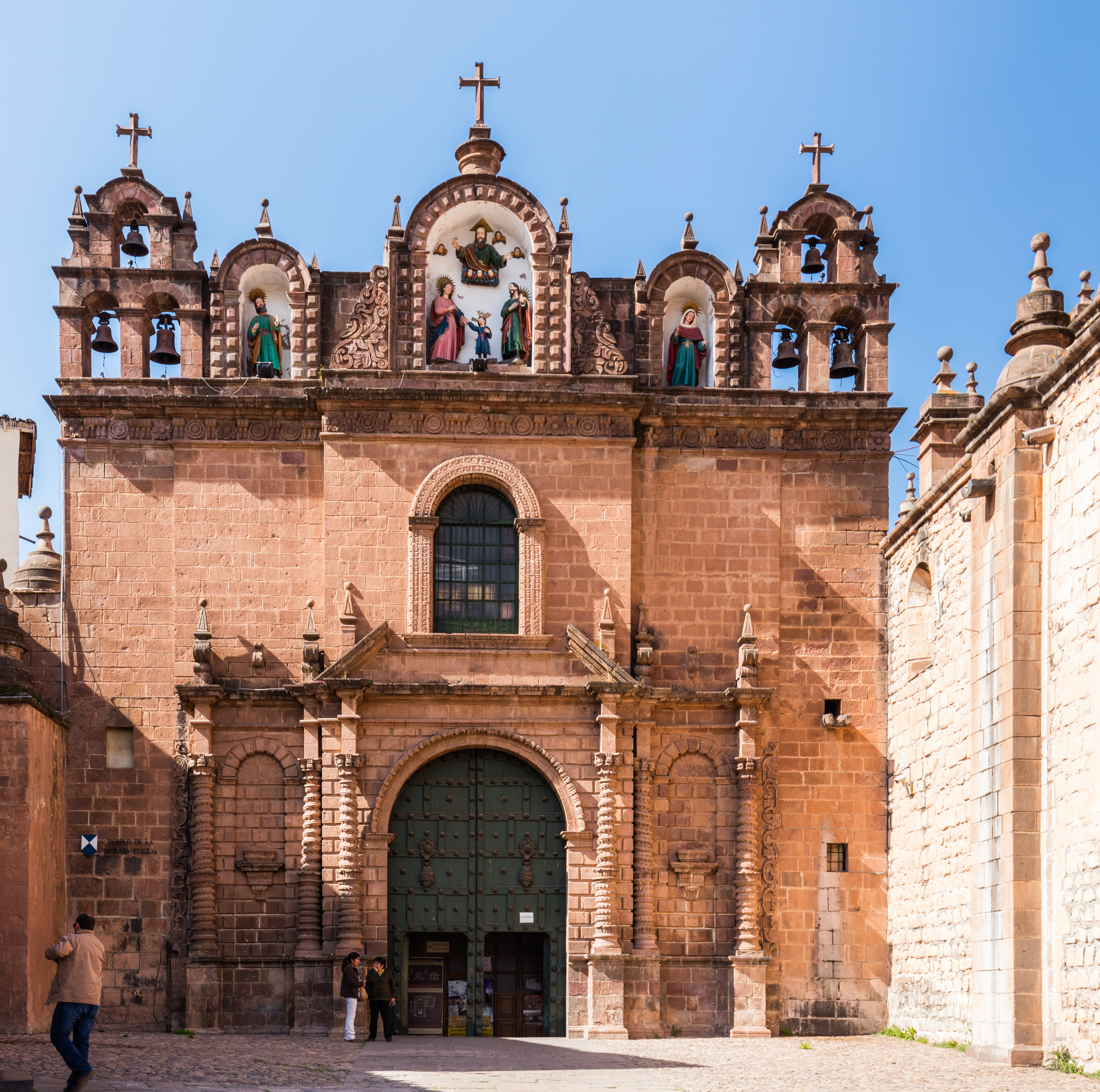
- Main facade
- Templo de la Sagrada Familia
- Location: Cusco
- Country: Peru
- Denomination: Roman Catholic

Architecture
- Style: Renaissance
- Groundbreaking: 1723
- Completed: 1735

UNESCO World Heritage Site
- Part of: City of Cuzco
- Criteria: Cultural: iii, iv
- Reference: 273
- Inscription: 1983 (7th Session)
- Area: Latin America and the Caribbean

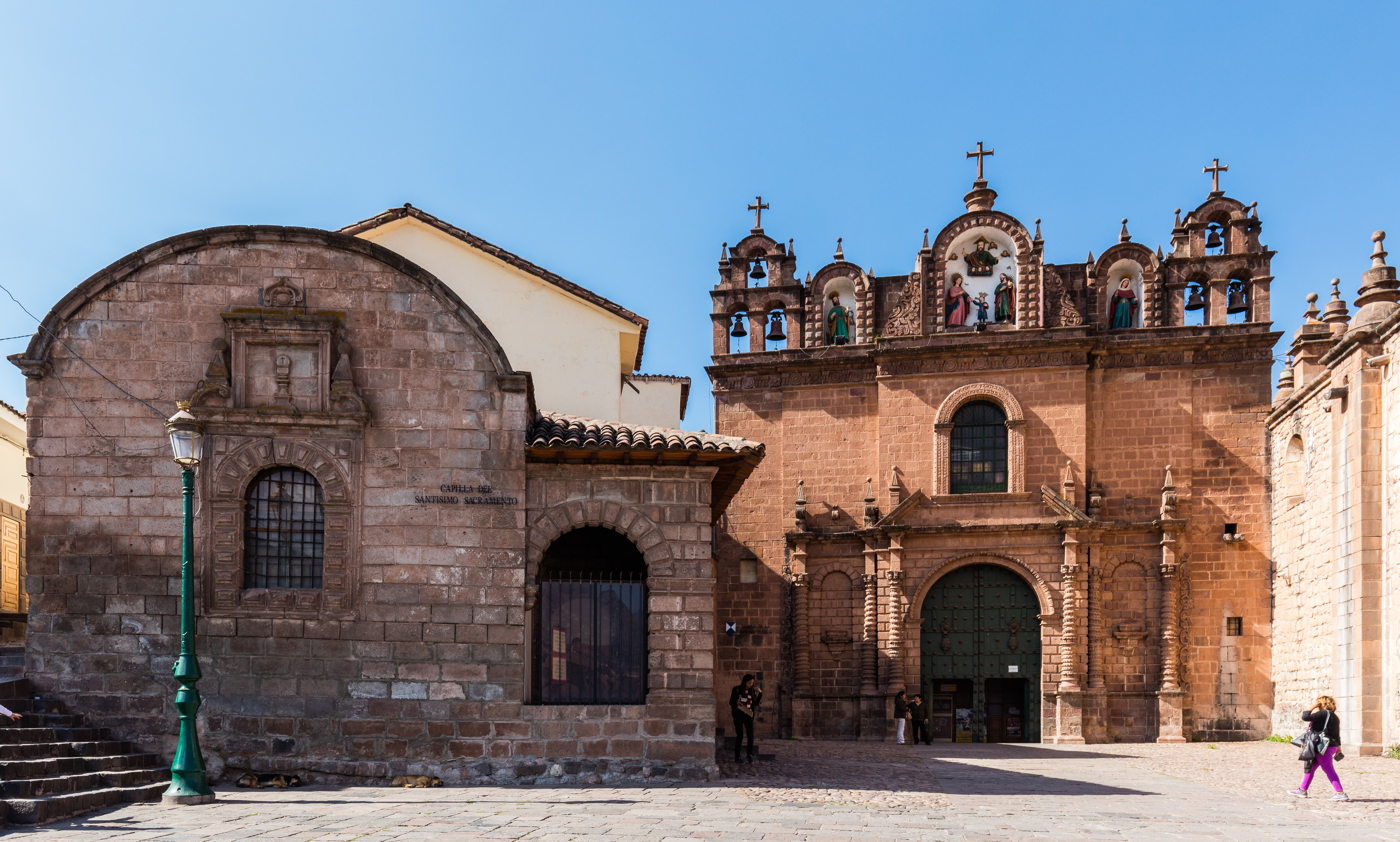
View of all the facade

The Templo de la Sagrada Familia (Temple of the Holy Family) also called Templo de Jesús, María y José, is a Renaissance church located in the city of Cusco, Cusco Region, Peru.

== History ==
Bishop Gabriel de Arregui (1654–1724) initiated construction for a church on the site in 1723, originally intending to dedicate it to the Immaculate Conception. Bishop Arregui died before this church was completed. Cathedral canons Dr. Juan José de la Concepción Rivadeneira and Dr. Martín de Espinoza de los Monteros re-initiated construction in 1733 and completed the church, now dedicated to the Holy Family, in 1735.

In 1996, with the support of the Archbishopric of Cusco and the European Union, the temple was restored after it was closed about 30 years.

== Description ==
The temple is composed of a Latin cross nave with a rectangular floor plan with small lateral niches. The walls inside the temple are polished stone with lime plaster. The whole church is also built with andesite. The roof of the temple is composed of five vaults built with rectangular bricks. In the sector of the presbytery the altarpiece or baroque altar with two lateral sacristies is located. The wall of the facade is treated as a rectangular stonework canvas, composed of three bodies. The crowning of the facade is a border element with circular ornaments on which the cornice tops.

The temple has an altarpiece of cedar, made in 1737, baroque, carved and gilded, with mostly old images and canvases and a beautiful silver front, as well as the tabernacle and the racks, all very well made. It is recorded that in 1745, José Pardo de Figueroa, Marquis of San Lorenzo de Valleumbroso, donated the front of silver, mayas, blandones and other wealths, as well as a silver lamp and a crystal lamp.

The interior paintings are by the noble Indigenous Antonio Sinchi Roca. The paintings are titled The Eucharist, The Penance and The Baptism, which possibly formed part of a series dedicated to the Sacraments. In another place, the portrait of Bishop Gabriel de Arregui was painted, the person who began the construction of the temple.
