= Daniel Estrada (politician) =

Peruvian politician

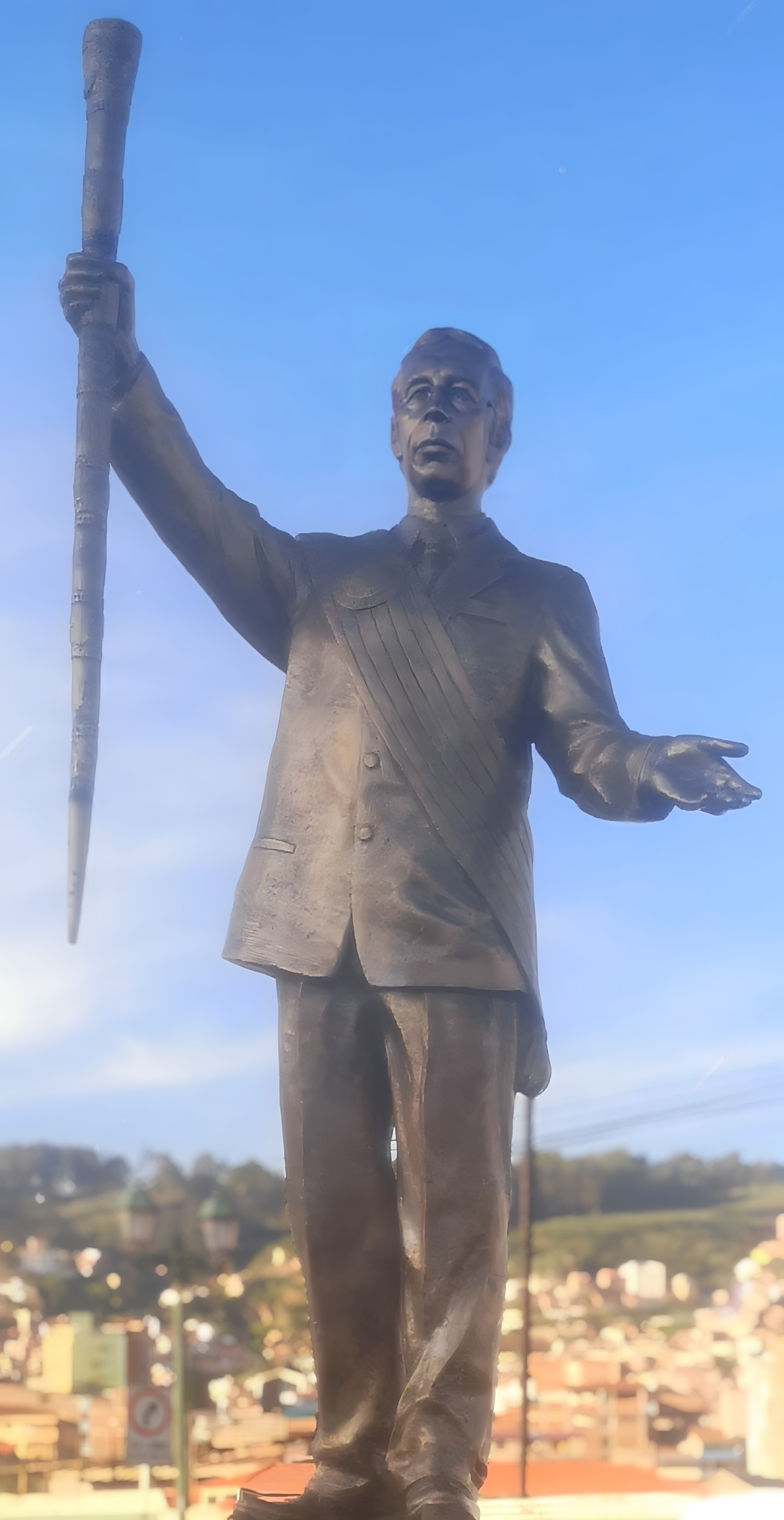
- Statue of Daniel Estrada

Member of the Congress
- In office July 26, 2001 – March 23, 2003
- Succeeded by: Teófilo Ochoa Vargas
- Constituency: Cusco
- In office July 26, 1995 – July 26, 2000
- Constituency: National
- In office July 27, 2000 – July 26, 2001
- Constituency: National

Mayor of Cusco
- In office January 1, 1990 – July 28, 1995
- Preceded by: Carlos Chacón Galindo
- Succeeded by: Raúl Salizar Saico
- In office January 1, 1984 – December 31, 1986
- Preceded by: Hernán Monzón Vásquez
- Succeeded by: Carlos Chacón Galindo

Personal details
- Born: Daniel Estrada Pérez; 3 January 1947 Cusco, Peru
- Died: 23 March 2003 (aged 56) Lima, Peru
- Party: Union for Peru
- Education: National University of San Antonio Abad in Cuzco
- Profession: Lawyer
- Nickname: Qosqoruna

Daniel Estrada Pérez (January 3, 1947, in Cusco - March 23, 2003 in Lima), also known as Qosqoruna, was a Peruvian lawyer and politician known for his contributions to the urban development and heritage preservation of Cusco. He served as the Provincial Mayor of Cusco Province, which contains the city of Cusco, from 1984 to 1986 and again from 1990 until 1995. Estrada was then elected to the Congress of the Republic of Peru, where he served from 1995 to 2003.

== Biography ==
He was born in Cusco, on January 3, 1947.

From 1969 to 1970, he served as the president of the Federated Student Center of the Faculty of Law and Political Science at the National University of San Antonio Abad in Cuzco. He earned his law degree in 1972.

In his professional career, he worked as a legal advisor for labor, civic, and cultural organizations until 1983.

In 1975, he was appointed dean of the Colegio de Abogados of Cusco, and in 1979, as one of its founders, he was elected president of the Human Rights Committee of Cusco. He also served as the president of the Southern Peruvian Regional Council on Human Rights from 1981 to 1982.

In 1980, he served as the General Defender of the Indigenous Peoples of America before the Russell Tribunal (Rotterdam).

== Political career ==
=== Provincial Mayor of Cuzco (1984–1986) ===
In the 1983 Cusco municipal elections|1983 municipal elections, he was elected Provincial Mayor of Cuzco by United Left for the municipal term 1984–1986.

=== Provincial Mayor of Cuzco (1989–1995) ===
In the 1989 Cusco municipal elections, he was re-elected as Provincial Mayor of Cuzco by the United Local Front for the term 1990–1993.

In the 1993 Cusco municipal elections, he was again re-elected Provincial Mayor of Cuzco for the term 1993–1995.

During his tenure as mayor, he is credited with several beautification projects in the city, such as the Monument to Inca Pachacútec, the esplanade of Qoricancha, the Tricentennial square in front of the old San Francisco de Borja School, as well as various "paqchas" or fountains built in the city, including those in San Blas Square and Pumaqchupan at the end of Avenida El Sol.

His administration also successfully lobbied for the recognition of Cusco as the "Historical Capital of Peru" in the text of the 1993 Constitution. At the local level, he mandated the use of the Quechua name for the city ("Qosqo") in official documents and formalized Quechua names for several streets in the historic center of Cusco. He supported the Academia Mayor de la Lengua Quechua. This effort earned him the Quechua nickname of Qosqoruna ("Man of Qosqo").

Under his leadership, Cusco established sister city relationships with Athens, Havana, La Paz, Bethlehem, Mexico City, and Moscow.

=== Congressman (1995–2000) ===
For the 1995 general elections, Estrada co-founded the Union for Peru party with former United Nations Secretary General Javier Pérez de Cuellar, who later ran as the presidential candidate. In the same elections, Estrada ran for the Congress of the Republic under the party and was elected as a Congressman with a high vote count of 141,120 votes for the parliamentary term 1995–2000.

During his time in Congress, he was one of the political opponents of the dictatorial regime of Alberto Fujimori.

=== Congressman (2000–2001) ===
In the 2000 general elections, he was re-elected as a Congressman for Union for Peru, receiving 21,502 votes, for the parliamentary term 2000–2005.

During the third swearing-in of Alberto Fujimori, Estrada withdrew from the Congress of the Republic in protest against the reelection and participated in the Four Quarters March led by opposition candidate Alejandro Toledo.

In November 2000, after the release of the Vladivideos, the resignation of Alberto Fujimori from the Presidency of the Republic via fax from Japan, and the assumption of Valentín Paniagua to the Interim Presidency, his parliamentary position was reduced until 2001 when new general elections were called.

=== Congressman (2001–2003) ===
In the 2001 general elections, Estrada was again re-elected as a Congressman representing Cusco for Union for Peru, receiving 20,037 votes, for the parliamentary term 2001–2006.

He served as a Congressman until March 23, 2003, when Estrada died, and was replaced by Mario Ochoa Vargas to complete the parliamentary term 2001–2006.

== Death ==
On March 23, 2003, after being diagnosed with cancer, Estrada died at the age of 56. He was honored by the Congress of the Republic, chaired by Carlos Ferrero Costa, and by then-President Alejandro Toledo, who remembered Estrada as "A democrat and a fighter for social justice." His remains rest in a mausoleum at the Cementerio General de La Almudena in Cusco.

== Gallery ==
Works carried out in the Historic Center of Cusco (1990-1992)

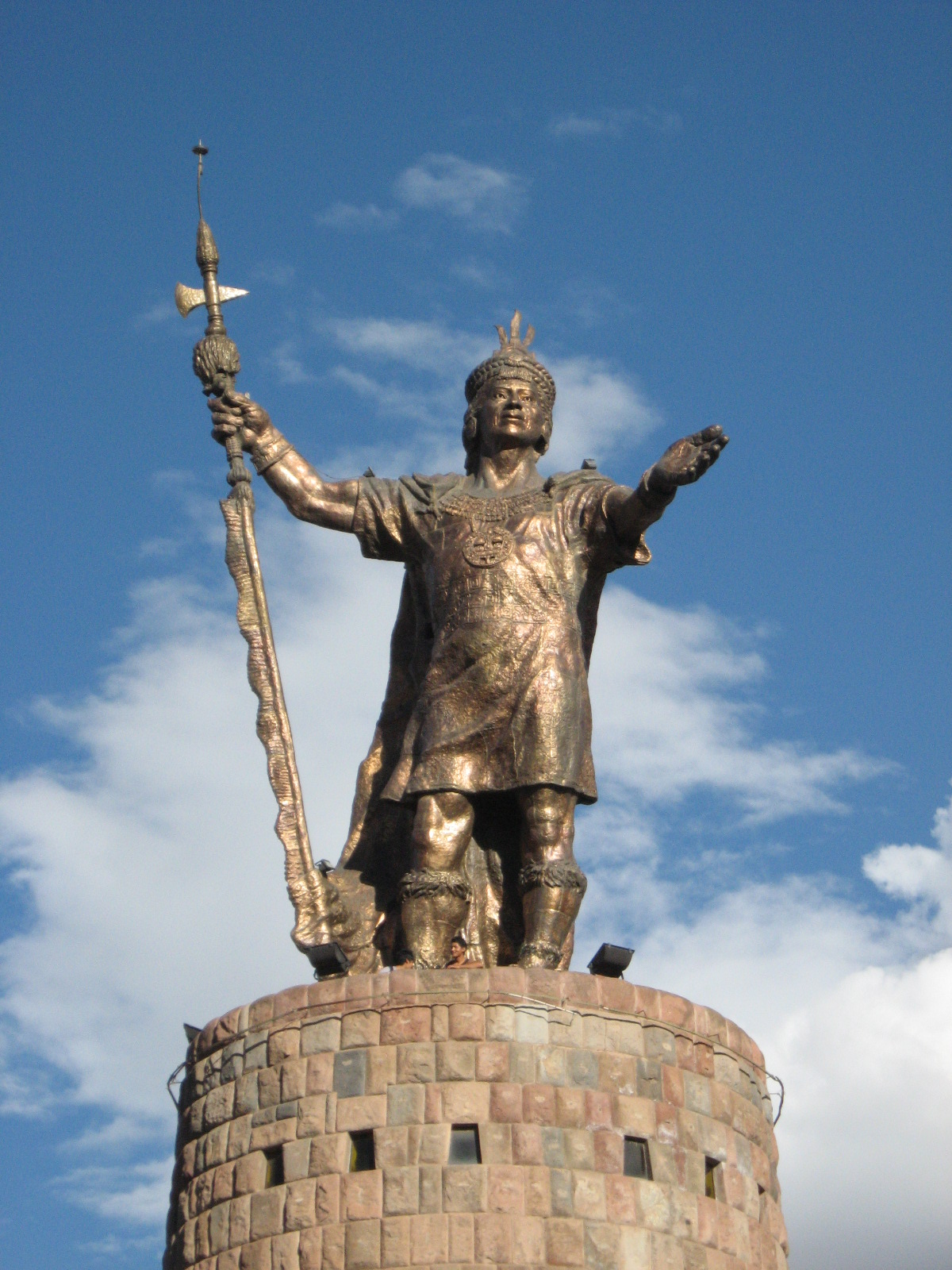
Monument to the Inca Pachacuti, one of the works inaugurated during the government of Estrada Pérez

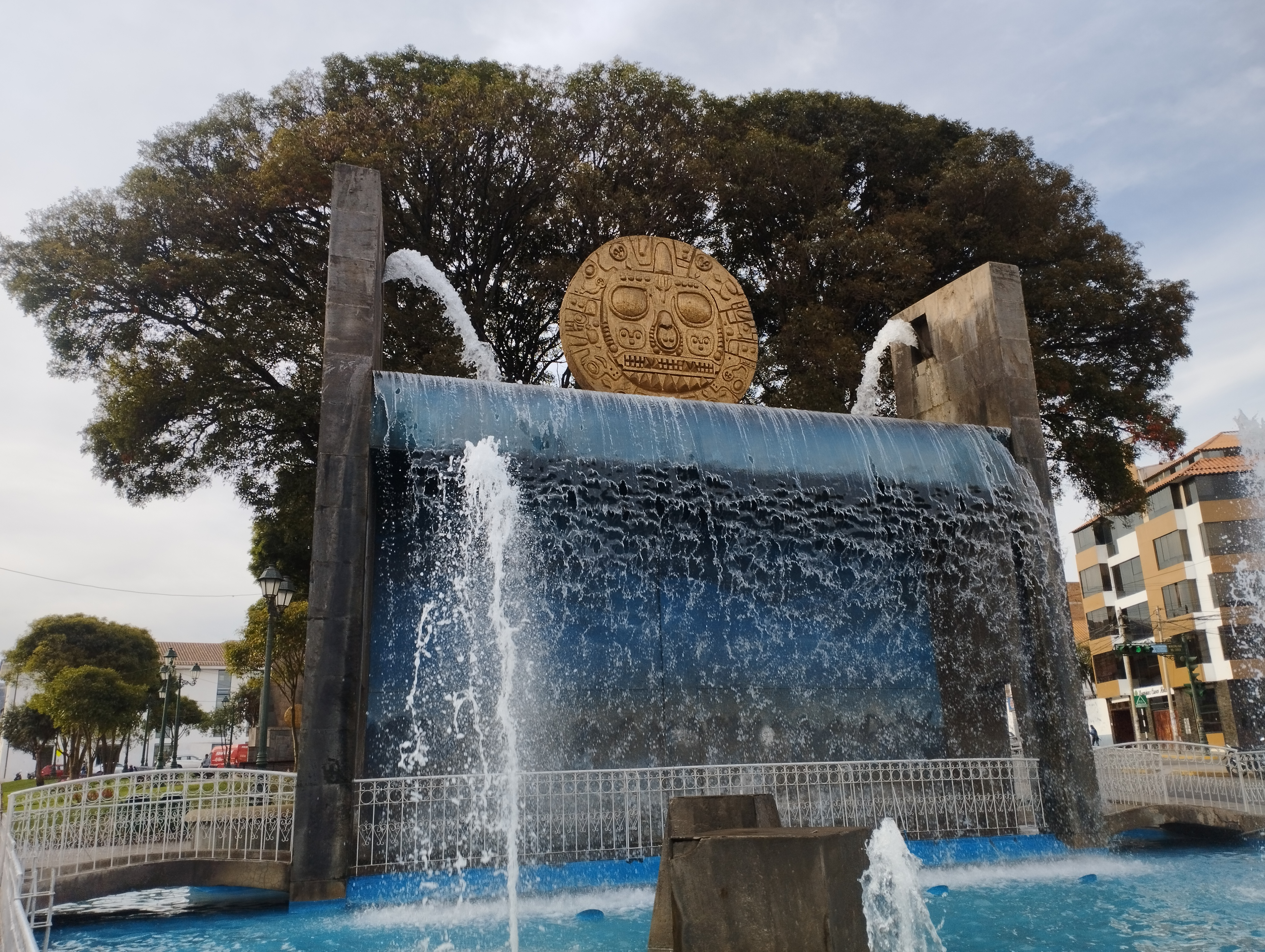
Paqcha (fountain) of Pumaqchupan

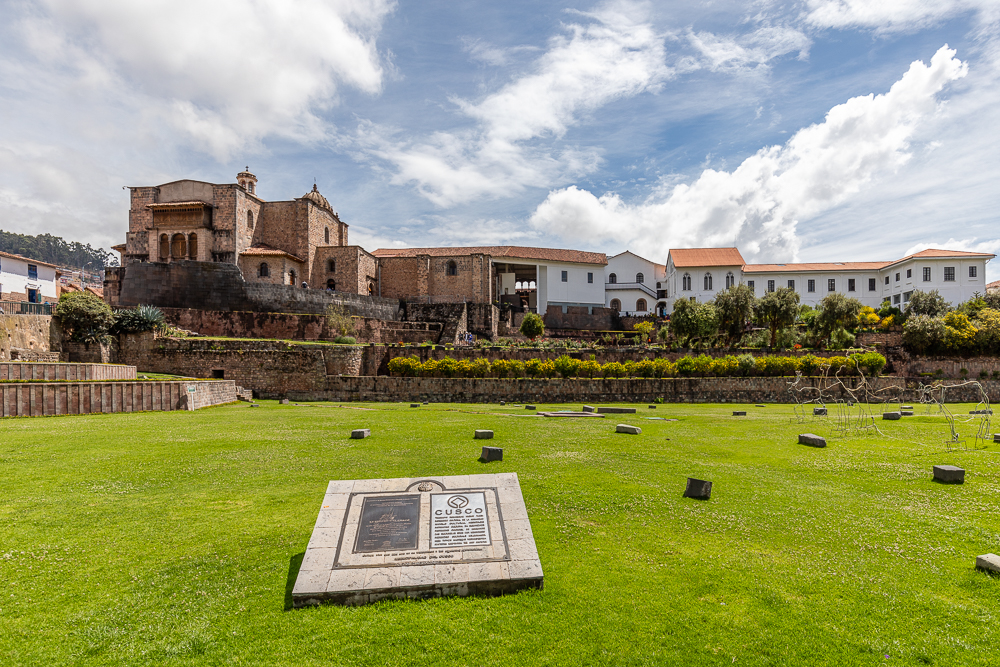
Esplanade of Koricancha

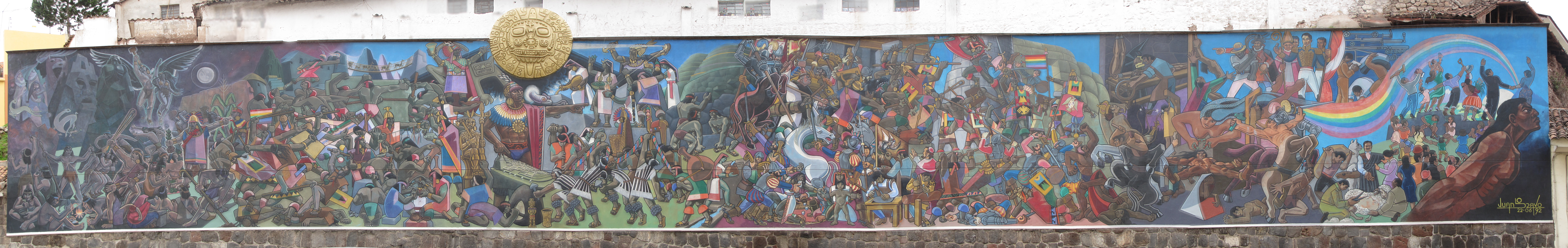
Historical mural of Qosqo, located on Avenida El Sol, covering three thousand years of Cusco's history

== Bibliography ==
- Vidal Pino Zambrano, Victor (2004). La experiencia del alcalde Daniel Estrada en el Cusco. Programa de las Naciones Unidas para el Desarrollo. ISBN 9972-612-12-0.
