= Cultural heritage of Peru =

The cultural heritage of Peru, officially the Cultural heritage of the Nation (Spanish: Patrimonio Cultural de la Nación), is the name given to the set of goods, both tangible and intangible, accumulated over time. These goods can be paleontological, archaeological, architectural, historical, artistic, military, social, anthropological or intellectual. In Peru, the competence for the protection of cultural heritage is in the hands of the Ministry of Culture.

In 1999, the National Institute of Culture published the Relación de Monumentos Históricos del Perú, the most comprehensive inventory to date of historic monuments declared in the country, listing properties built from the 16th to the 20th century. In August 2000, the institute also published a list of temples, convents and cemeteries declared cultural heritage.

== Classification ==
In Peru, cultural heritage is regulated by Law No. 28296 (General Law of Cultural Heritage of the Nation), which establishes the national policy for the defense, protection, promotion, ownership and legal regime and the destination of the goods that constitute the Cultural Heritage of the Nation.

An asset that is part of the Cultural Heritage of the Nation is understood to be any manifestation of human activity -material or immaterial- that due to its importance, value and paleontological, archaeological, architectural, historical, artistic, military, social, anthropological or intellectual significance, is expressly declared as such or on which there is a legal presumption of being so. Said assets have the status of public or private property with the limitations established by this Law.

=== Categories ===
- Immovable tangible heritage: Those cultural assets that cannot be moved, including archaeological sites and colonial and republican buildings.
- Movable tangible heritage: Heritage objects that can be moved.
- Intangible heritage: Cultural manifestations of living culture.
- Underwater cultural heritage: cultural vestiges that have been totally or partially submerged in water, continuously or periodically, for at least 100 years.
- Documentary heritage: Printed or digital documentation kept in archives and similar institutions.
- Industrial heritage: Real estate and personal property acquired or produced in connection with industrial activities, products generated and related documentation.

== See also ==
- Culture of Peru
- List of World Heritage Sites in Peru
