= Sayacmarca =

Archaeological site in Peru

Coordinates: 13°13′41.4″S 72°31′00.9″W

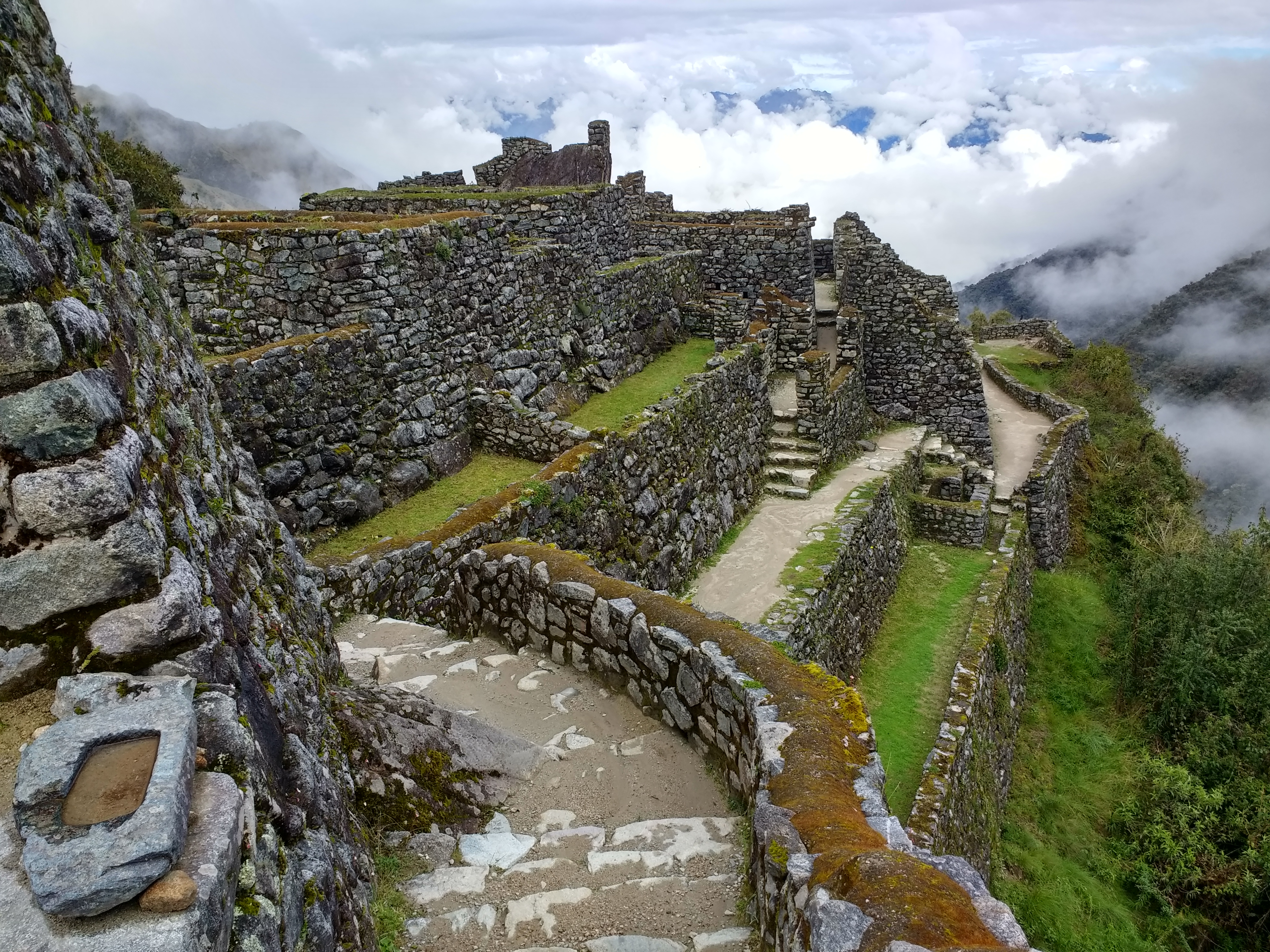
- Partial view of Sayacmarca.

- Location within Peru
- Type: Settlement
- Cultures: Inca
- Location: Cusco Region

Sayacmarca is an archaeological site in Peru located in the Cusco Region, Urubamba Province, Machupicchu District. It is situated southwest of the archaeological site Runkuraqay and the Runkuraqay pass and southeast of the sites Phuyupatamarka and Qunchamarka.

Hiram Bingham III visited the site in April 1915, referring to it as Cedrobamba, or cedar plain.

== See also ==
- Inti Punku
- Pakaymayu
- Warmi Wañusqa
- Wiñay Wayna
