= Inca Trail to Machu Picchu =

Ancient trail in Peru

Coordinates: 13°15′29″S 72°15′48″W

UNESCO World Heritage Site
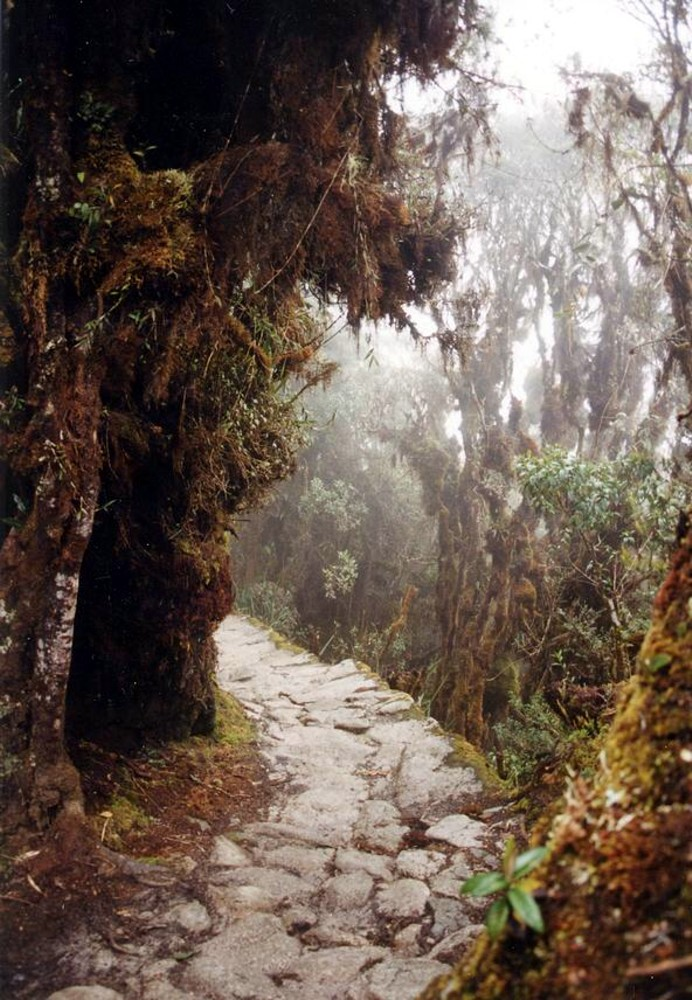
- Much of the trail is of original Inca construction
- Interactive map of Inca Trail to Machu Picchu
- Part of: Inca road system (Qhapaq Ñan)
- Criteria: Cultural: ii, iii, iv, vi
- Reference: 1459
- Inscription: 2014 (38th Session)
- Area: 11,406.95 ha (28,187.2 acres)
- Buffer zone: 663,069.68 ha (1,638,480.9 acres)

Inca Trail to Machu Picchu
- Length: 42 kilometres (26 mi)
- Location: Urubamba, Cusco, Peru
- Trailheads: Piskakuchu (Km 82); Qoriwayrachina (Km 88)
- Use: Hiking
- Elevation gain/loss: 2,500 metres (8,200 ft) gain approximately
- Highest point: Warmi Wañusqa; 4,215 metres (13,829 ft)
- Lowest point: Machu Picchu; 2,430 metres (7,970 ft)
- Season: Winter

The Inca Trail to Machu Picchu (also known as Camino Inca or Camino Inka) is a hiking trail in Peru that terminates at Machu Picchu. It consists of three overlapping trails: Mollepata, Classic, and One Day. Mollepata is the longest of the three routes with the highest mountain pass and intersects with the Classic route before crossing Warmiwañusqa ("dead woman"). Located in the Andes mountain range, the trail passes through several types of Andean environments including cloud forest and alpine tundra. Settlements, tunnels, and many Incan ruins are located along the trail before ending the terminus at the Sun Gate on Machu Picchu mountain. The two longer routes require an ascent to beyond 4,200 metres (13,800 ft) above sea level, which can result in altitude sickness.

Concern about overuse leading to erosion has led the Peruvian government to place a limit on the number of people who may hike this trail per season, and to sharply limit the companies that can provide guides. As a result, advance booking is mandatory. A maximum of 500 people are allowed on the trail each day, of which only 200 are trekkers, the rest being guides and porters. As a result, the high season books out very quickly.

== Classic trail ==
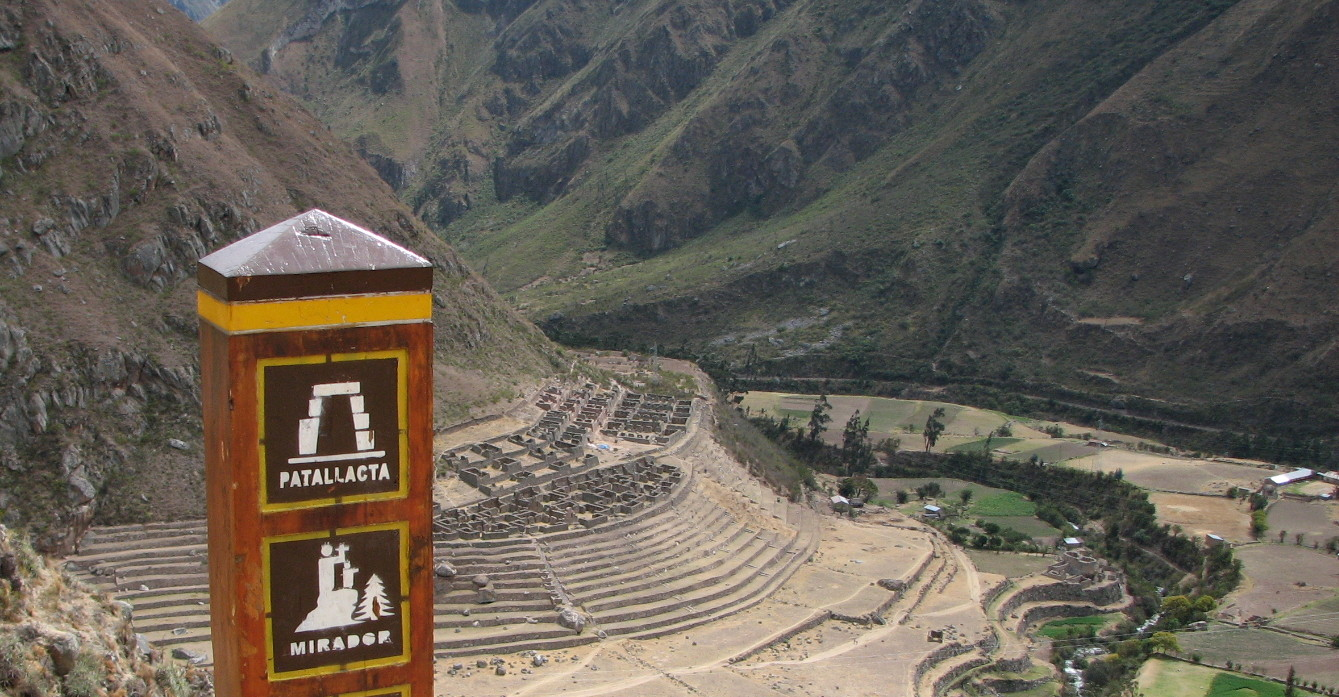
Patallacta viewed from above

Trekkers normally take four or five days to complete the "Classic Inca Trail", but a two-day trek from Km 104 is also possible. The Km 104 trail involves only six or seven hours' hiking and can be completed in one day.

It starts from one of two points: 88 km (55 miles) or 82 km (51 miles) from Cusco on the Urubamba River at approximately 2,800 metres (9,200 ft) or 2,600 metres (8,500 ft) elevation, respectively.

Both of these trail segments meet above the Inca ruins of Patallaqta (sometimes called Llaqtapata), a site used for religious and ceremonial functions, crop production, and housing for soldiers from the nearby hilltop site of Willkaraqay, an ancient pre-Inca site first inhabited around 500 BC. The trail undulates, but overall ascends along the Cusichaka River.

At the small village Wayllapampa ("grassy plain", Wayllabamba) the trail intersects with the "Mollepata Trail" at 3,000 metres (9,800 ft).

Small, permanent settlements are located adjacent to the trail, and Wayllapampa has approximately 400 inhabitants (130 families) spread along this portion of the trail. Pack animals—horses, mules, donkeys, and llamas—are allowed.

At Wayllapampa the trail to Machu Picchu turns west and begins ascending along a tributary of the Cusichaka. Because of previous damage caused by hooves, pack animals are not allowed on the remainder of the trail. For the same reason, metal-tipped trekking poles are not allowed on the trail.

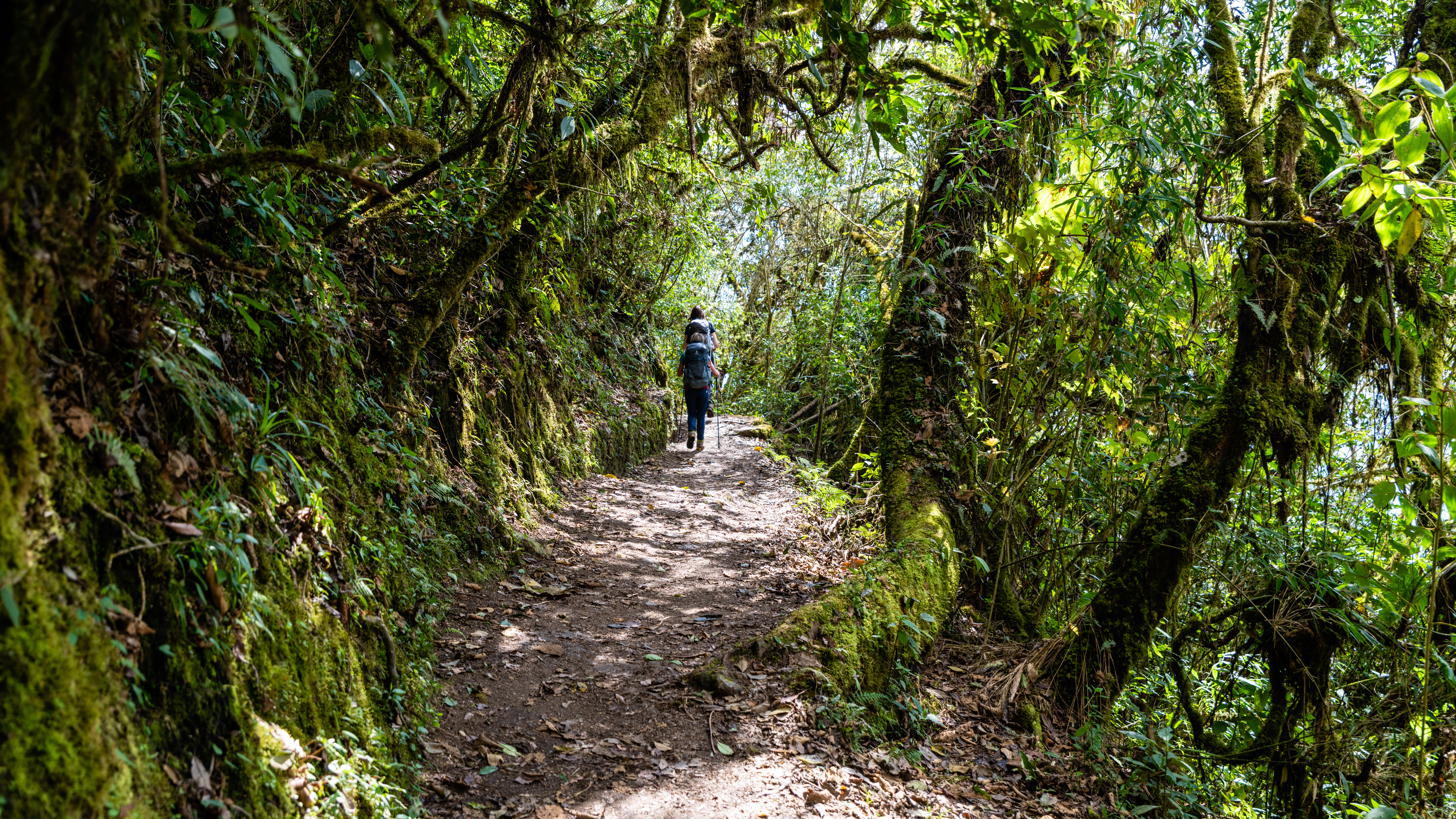
Inca Trail cloud forest

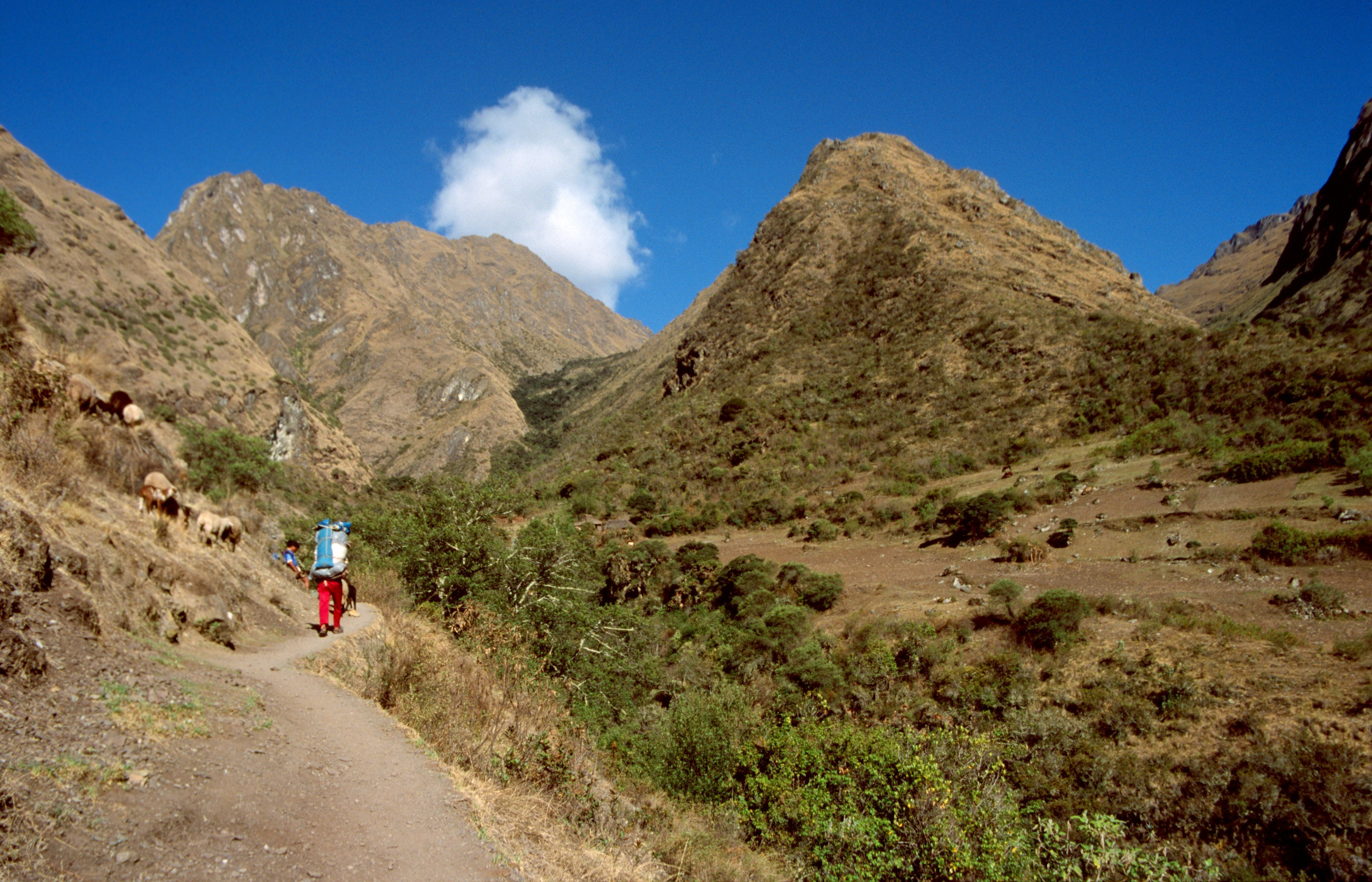
Ascent to Warmi Wañusqa

As the trail ascends toward Warmi Wañusqa, or "Dead Woman's Pass", which resembles a supine woman, it passes through differing habitats, one of which is a cloud forest containing Polylepis trees. The campsite at Llulluch'apampa (Llulluchapampa) is located on this stretch of trail at 3,800 metres (12,500 ft). The pass itself is located at 4,215 m (13,829 ft) above sea level, and is the highest point on this, the "Classic" trail.

After crossing the pass the trail drops steeply into the Pakaymayu drainage. At a distance of 2.1 km and 600 m below the pass is the campground Pakaymayu.

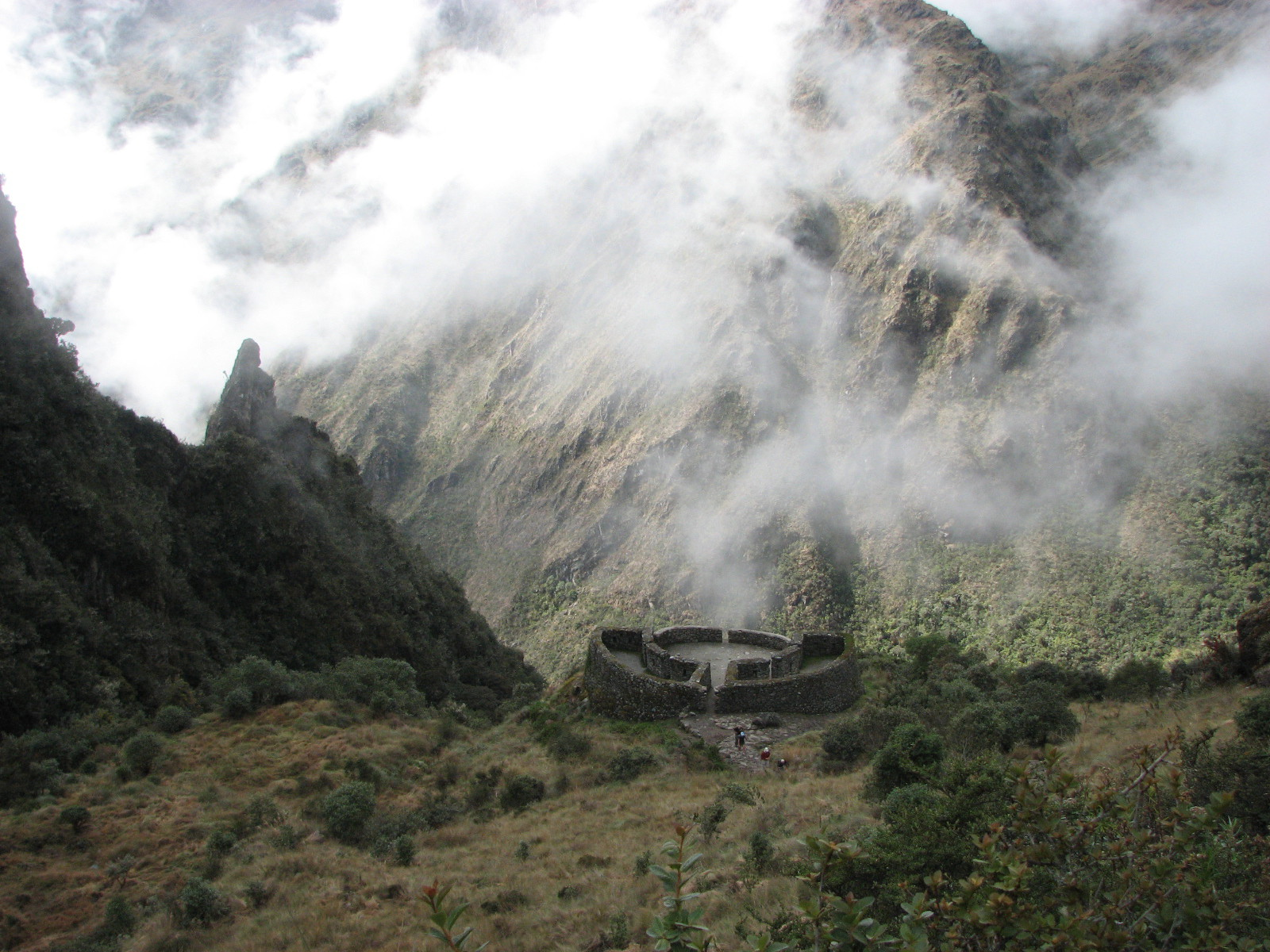
The tambo Runkuraqay

After passing Pakaymayu the trail begins steeply ascending the other side of the valley. One kilometre along the trail, at an elevation of 3,750 metres (12,300 ft) is the Inca tampu Runkuraqay, ruins which overlook the valley. The site was heavily restored in the late 1990s.

The trail continues to ascend, passing a small lake named Quchapata (Cochapata) in an area that is recognized as deer habitat. This site had been used as a camp site. As with other sites that were being degraded due to overuse, camping is no longer allowed. The trail reaches the pass at an elevation of 3950 m.

The trail continues through high cloud forest, undulating, sometimes steeply while affording increasingly dramatic viewpoints of mountains and dropoffs. Next, the Sayaqmarka ("steep-place town") is reached followed by the tampu Qunchamarka. A long Inca tunnel and a viewpoint overlooking two valleys: the Urubamba and Aobamba (a broken word), are passed.

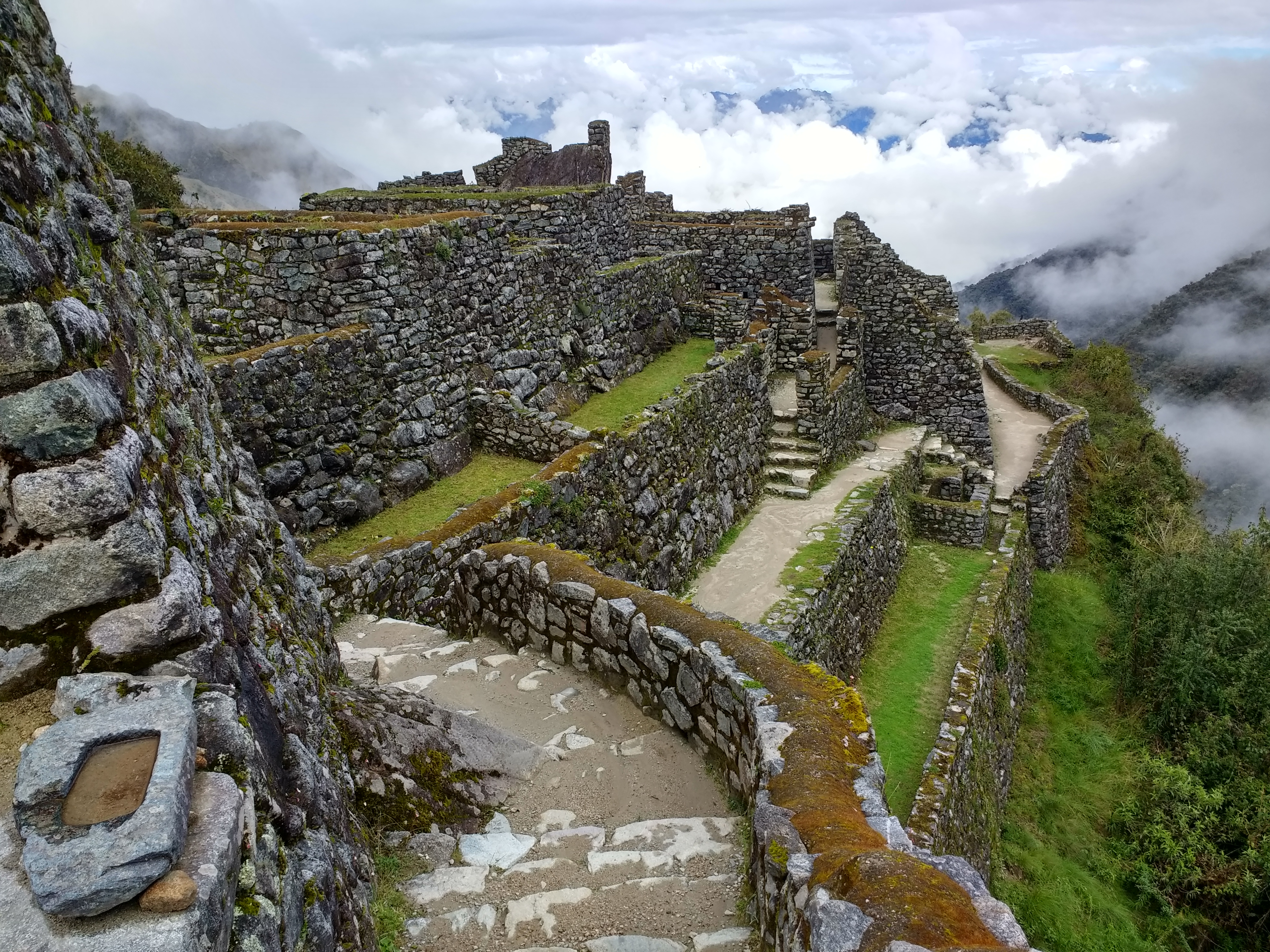
Sayacmarca

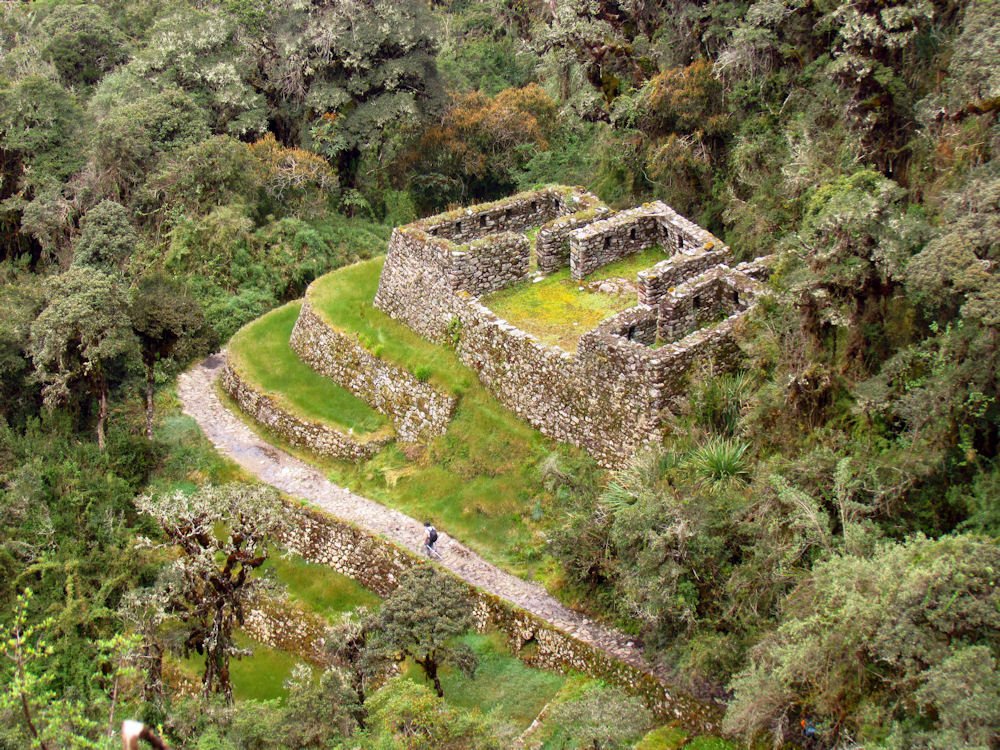
Conchamarka

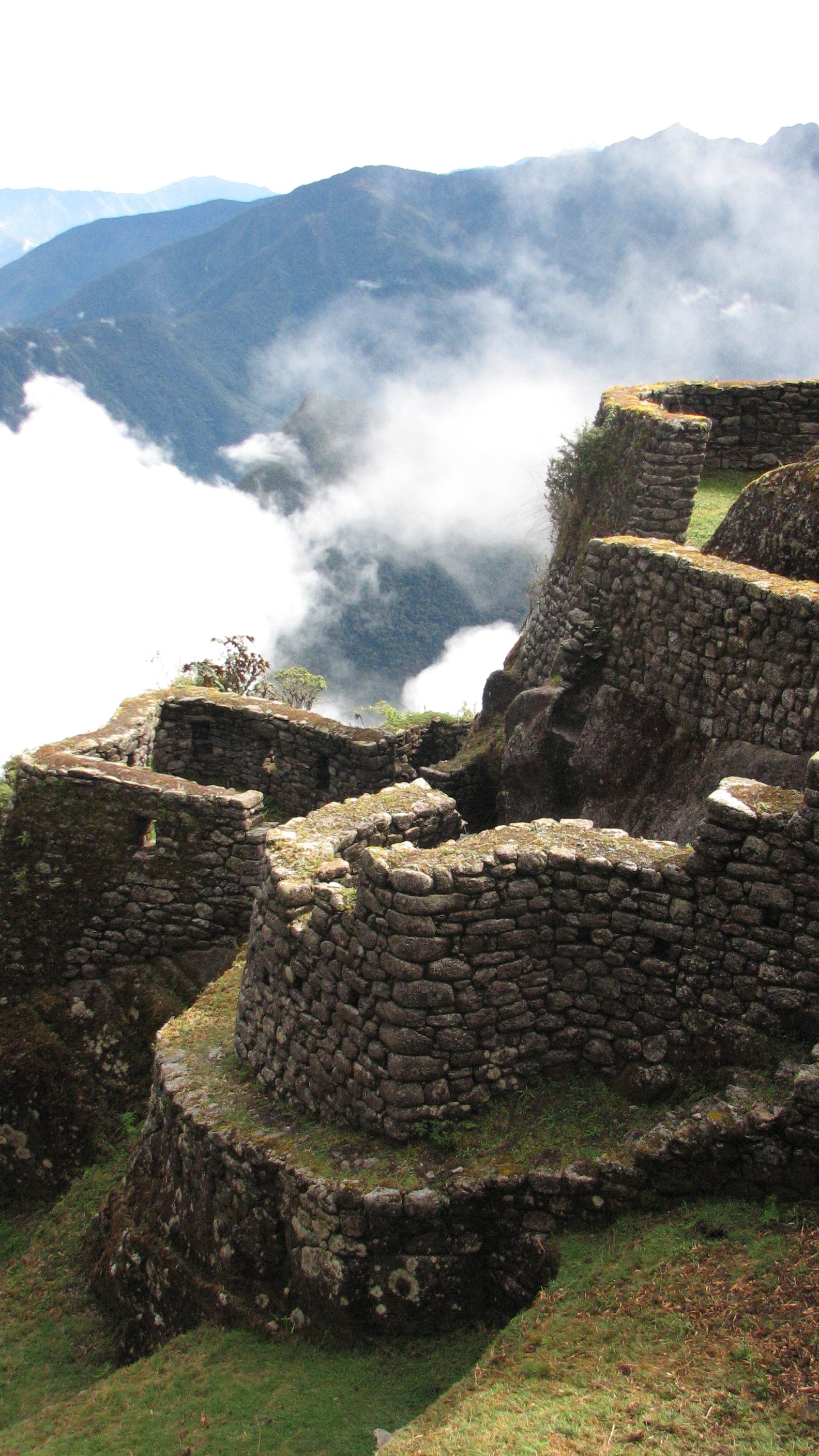
Phuyupatamarka ruins

Another high point at elevation of 3650 m is crossed, followed by a campground, and then after a short descent, a site with extensive ruins. The name Phuyupatamarka ("cloud-level town") is applied to both the campground, and the ruins.

Hiram Bingham III discovered the site, but left most of it covered with vegetation. The Fejos team named the site, and uncovered the remainder. Design of the site closely follows the natural contours, and includes five fountains and an altar, which was probably used for llama sacrifice.

The trail then descends approximately 1000 metres including an irregular staircase of approximately 1500 steps, some of which were carved into solid granite. Vegetation becomes more dense, lush, and jungle-like with an accompanying increase in butterflies and birds. A second Inca tunnel is along this section of trail.

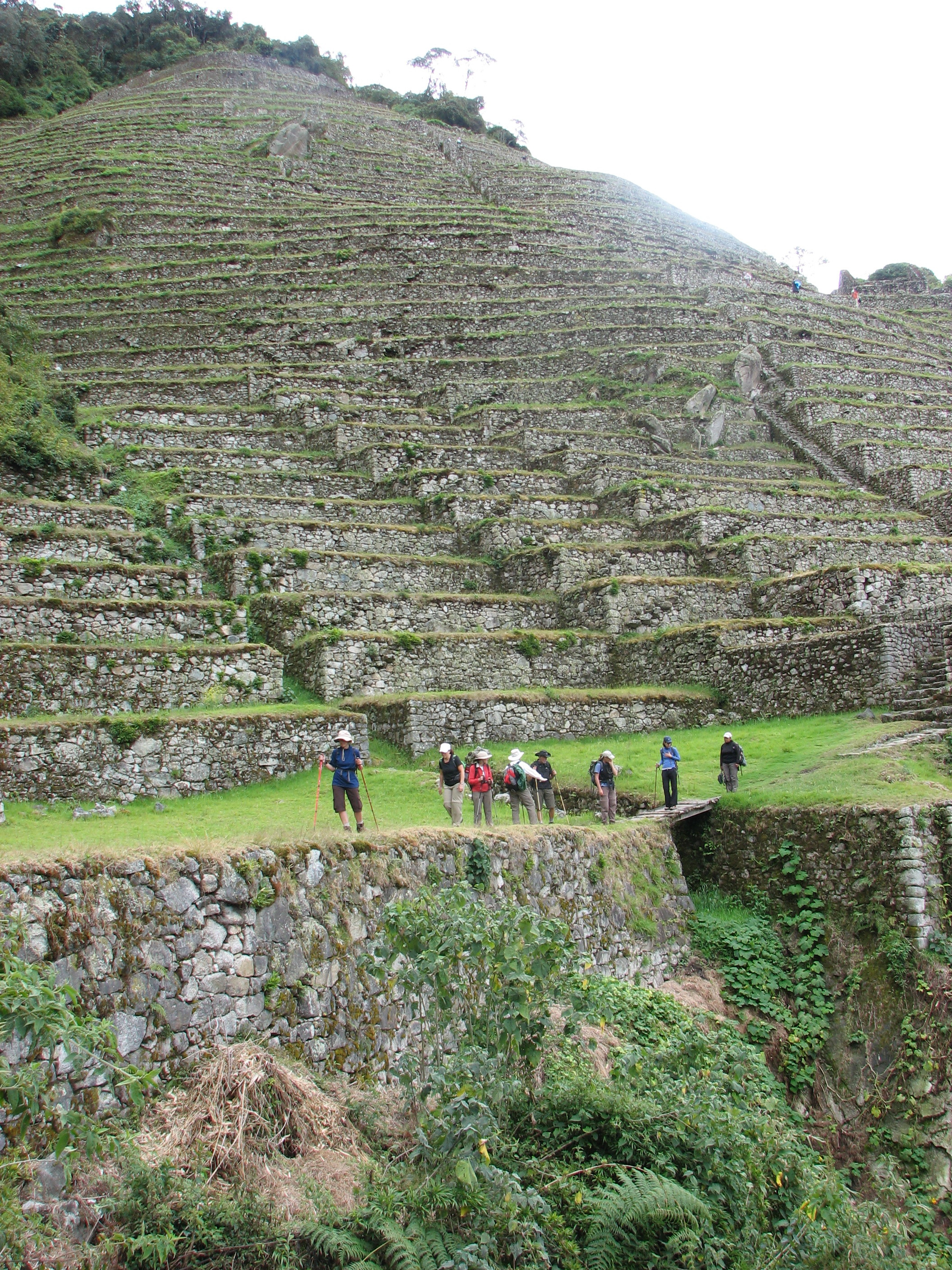
Intipata

Even before passing through the tunnel there are views down to the Willkanuta River, the first since leaving the river at Patallaqta. The number of these views increases. After the tunnel the town of Machupicchu (Aguas Calientes) can be seen, and trains running along the river can be heard. As the trail nears Intipata, it affords views of the "Two Day" Inca Trail (aka "Camino Real de los Inkas" or "One Day Inca Trail"). A small spur of the trail leads directly to Wiñay Wayna, while the main route continues to Intipata.

Intipata (aka Yunkapata) is a recently uncovered extensive set of agricultural terraces which follow the convex shape of the terrain. Potatoes, maize, fruit, and sweet potato were grown here.

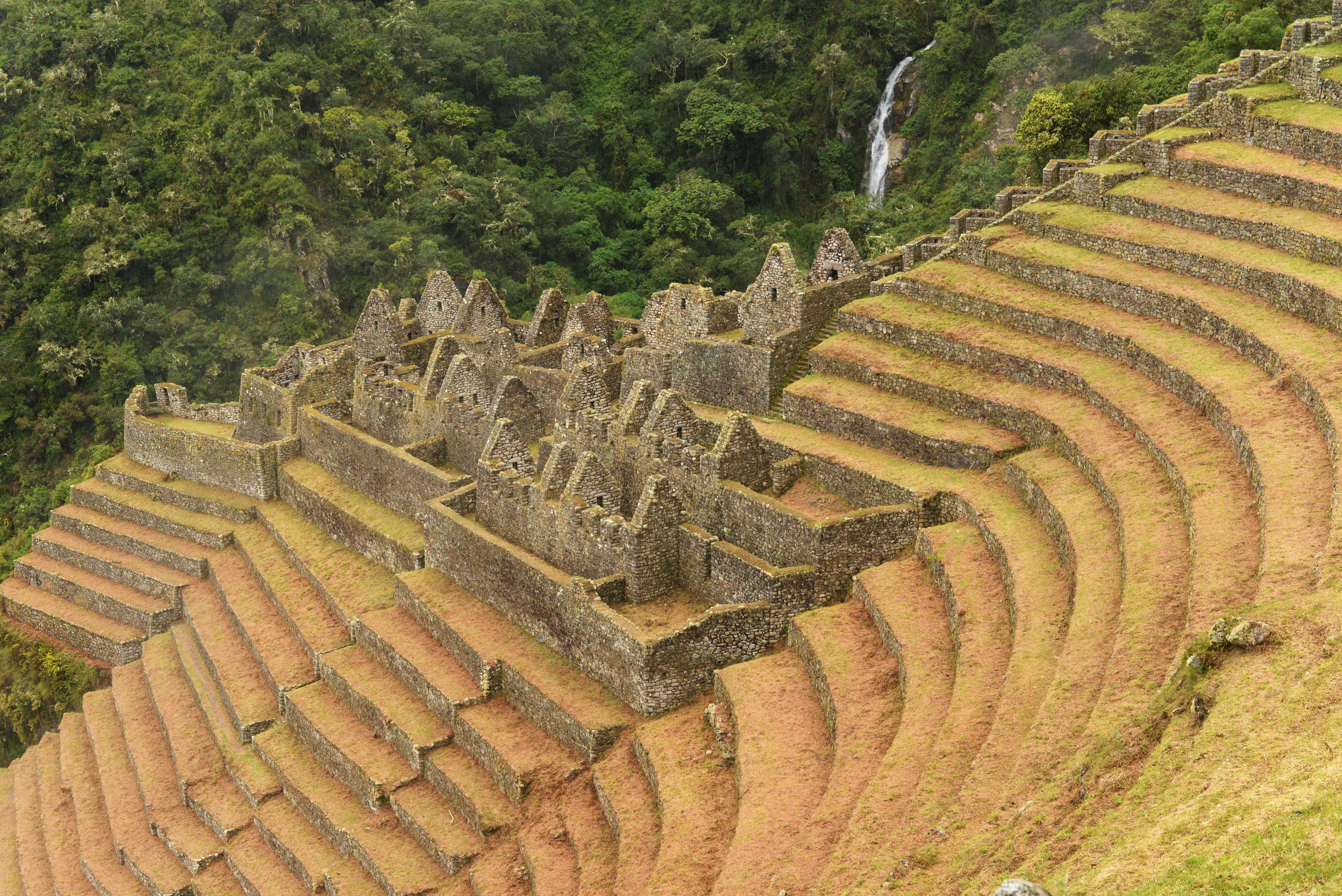
Wiñay Wayna ruins, showing the terraces and lower structure

The name Wiñay Wayna (forever young) is used to refer to both a hostel–restaurant–camp site and a set of Inca ruins. Two groups of major architectural structures, a lower and upper, are set among multiple agricultural terraces at this concave mountainside site. A long flight of fountains or ritual baths utilizing as many as 19 springs runs between the two groups of buildings.

From Wiñay Wayna the trail undulates along below the crest of the east slope of the mountain named Machu Picchu. The steep stairs leading to Inti Punku ("sun gate") are reached after approximately 3 km. Reaching the crest of this ridge reveals the grandeur of the ruins of Machu Picchu, which lie below. A short downhill walk is the final section of the trail.

== Elevation ==
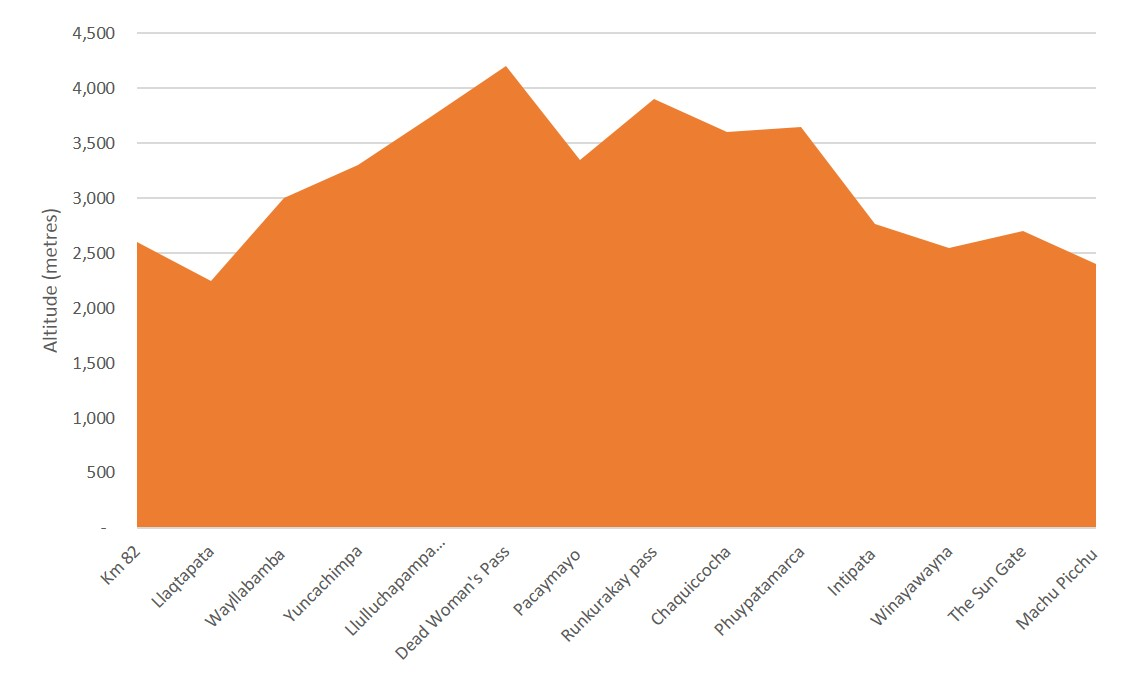
Inca Trail elevation graph

The Inca Trail elevation varies greatly and people often struggle with altitude sickness, especially if they have not spent much time in Cusco before trekking the trail.

Cusco stands at 3,200 metres and is already significantly higher than Machu Picchu itself, though many sections of the Inca Trail are much higher.

Starting at 2,600 metres, the trail ascends to 3,300 metres on the first day. The second day ascends over Dead Woman's pass- the highest point on the trail at 4,200 metres. This is the most dangerous point for altitude sickness, though little time is spent at this elevation and the trail descends again to 3,600 metres. From here, the trail descends until it arrives at Machu Picchu at 2,430 metres.

== Operations ==
=== Permits ===
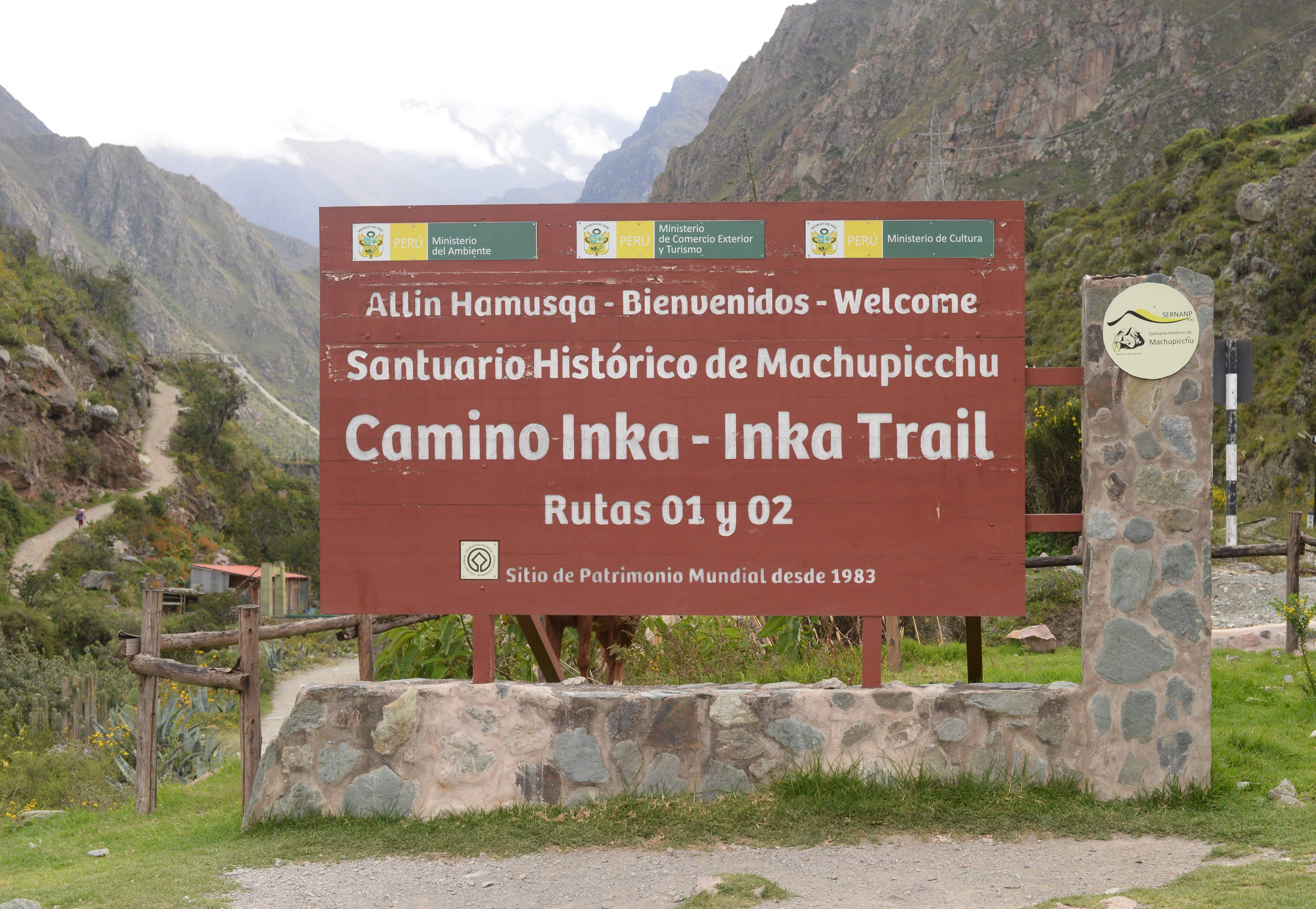
Sign at the entrance to the Inca trail at Piscacucho.

Because of its popularity, the Peruvian Government instituted controls to reduce human impact on the Inca Trail and the ancient city, due to the strain that increased foot travel places on the trail system. Since 2001, quotas limit the number of people (hikers, porters and guides) on the trail each day. Anyone wishing to hike the trail must get a permit beforehand. As of 2016, 500 permits are issued per day. All of the year's permits are released in October and are sold on a first-come, first-served basis. Until 2017, they were released in January. Permits sell out quickly, particularly those for the high season. Most operators advise hikers to buy permits as soon as possible after they are released. The government also mandates that every trekker on the trail must be accompanied by a guide. Because of this rule, permits can only be bought through a government registered tour operator. All permits are paired with an individual passport and are not transferable. The government monitors the trail closely; there are several control points along the trail.

=== Maintenance and Management ===
The trail is closed every February for cleaning. This was originally undertaken informally by organizations such as South American Explorers, but is now managed officially.

Tourism management at Machu Picchu creates policies and regulations to limit effects caused by tourism on the archaeological site in Peru. While tourism increased in the area, concerns were raised due to the crowding, environmental destruction, and damages to the site itself. Research finds that the high levels of visitors threaten the ecosystems, culture, and physical conditions of the archaeological site and the areas in the vicinity (Larson & Poudyal, 2012). However, tourism also creates opportunity for the community which makes for greater conflicts between protecting the land and maintaining the benefits of its significance on tourism and the economy.

Due to the concerns, visitor capacity rates have been implemented, admission regulations and prices have changes, as well as other measures to reduce the impact of tourism on Machu Picchu. UNESCO has played a pivotal role in ensuring that the site’s management intend to prioritize the site’s integrity rather than its economic value. And they have called for a multitude of policies to be put into place such as visitor capacities, visitor safety policies, and carry-capacity policies. The involvement of UNESCO reflects the larger conflicts between the tourism and economic values versus the preservation. Because the balance being tipped in either direction can create issues for the site and for the benefits of the sites touristic value (Larson & Poudyal, 2012). Therefore the management and reduction on tourism of Machu Picchu requires a balance between the economic interests of both Peru and local communities/businesses that rely on tourism and the integrity of the ecosystems, history, culture, and physical structure of the site.

== See also ==
- Lares trek, one of the alternative routes to Machu Picchu
- Salcantay trek
- Tourism in Peru
- The Chilean Inca Trail
- Inca road system
- Qhapaq Ñan trail

== Sources ==
- Box, Ben; Frankham, Steve (2008). Cuzco & the Inca heartland (4 ed.). Footprint Books. ISBN 978-1-906098-20-9.
- Jenkins, Dilwyn (2003). The Rough Guide to Peru. Rough Guides. ISBN 978-1-84353-074-9.
- Megarry, Jacquetta; Davies, Roy (2006). Explore the Inca Trail. Rucksack Readers. ISBN 978-1-898481-25-6.
