= Qunchamarka =

Archaeological site in Peru

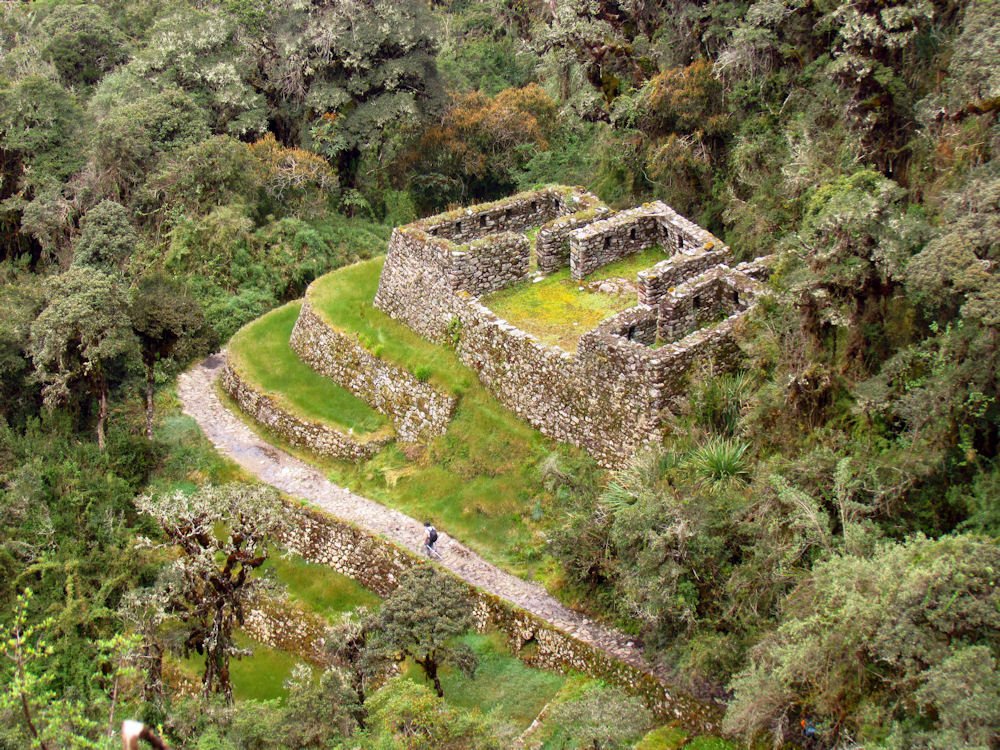
- Qunchamarka
- Interactive map of Qunchamarka
- Cultures: Inca
- Location: Cusco Region, Peru

Qunchamarka (Quechua, Hispanicized spelling Conchamarca, Conchamarka, Qonchamarca, regionally also spelled 'Qonchamarka') is an archaeological site in Peru located in the Cusco Region, Urubamba Province, Machupicchu District, southwest of the mountain Runkuraqay. It lies between the archaeological sites Sayaqmarka and Phuyupatamarka on the Inca Trail to Machu Picchu.

== See also ==
- Inti Punku
- Pakaymayu
- Warmi Wañusqa
- Wiñay Wayna
