= Alfredo Ferreyros =

Peruvian entrepreneur

- Born: Alfredo Ferreyros Gildemeister; April 1, 1950 (age 76); Lima, Peru

Alfredo Ferreyros Gildemeister (born April 1, 1950 in Lima) is a Peruvian entrepreneur who played a key role in developing the adventure tourism industry in his country. In 1975, he founded one of the first companies to offer tours along the Inca Trail and other mountain routes, focusing on cultural and environmental tourism.

== Explorandes ==
In 1975, he founded Explorandes in Cusco, the first company in Peru dedicated to promoting adventure tourism in the Andes, with a focus on the development of local communities and environmental protection.

Ferreyros, who had studied Quechua, the language spoken during the height of the Inca civilization, during his university years in the United States, immersed himself in the Andean rural world and the values that underpin the way of life of its inhabitants, who respect the cycles of nature.

Explorandes was the first company to operate guided tours along the famous Inca Trail to Machu Picchu.

A year after its founding, Explorandes began offering adventure trips to Choquequirao, the Inca citadel located near the Salcantay mountain, and shortly after expanded its operations to the Cordillera Blanca, where the company has developed hiking routes around Mount Huascarán and other peaks over 6,000 meters high, contributing to Peru's reputation as a mountaineering destination in the region.

Currently, Explorandes is launching new routes and has established new adventure centers such as the Piuray Outdoor Center and Titikayak. Additionally, the company is relaunching new hiking routes in the Cordillera Blanca and along the Great Inca Road or Qhapaq Ñan, the extensive road network of the Inca Empire.

== Positions and Awards ==
In 1981, recognizing the potential for tourism development in the Andes, Ferreyros, along with a group of businesspeople from Cusco and Lima, founded the Peruvian Association of Adventure and Ecotourism (APTAE); the first professional association in Peru dedicated to promoting and managing adventure tourism activities responsibly.

He is a member of the Advisory Council of the Adventure Travel Trade Association (ATTA), a co-founder and former executive director of the Institute for the Common Good (IBC), and a member of the Advisory Council for the Hotel and Tourism Management program at the Peruvian University of Applied Sciences (UPC).

Between 2003 and 2007, he served as executive director of the Peruvian branch of Conservation International, one of the world's leading organizations for biodiversity conservation.

In March 2025, Alfredo Ferreyros was inducted into the Latin American Travel Association (LATA) Hall of Fame in London, in recognition of his career and contributions to the development of the tourism sector in South America.

== See also ==
- Inca road system
- Inca Trail to Machu Picchu
