= Warmi Wañusqa =

Mountain pass in Peru

Coordinates: 13°14′34″S 72°29′03″W

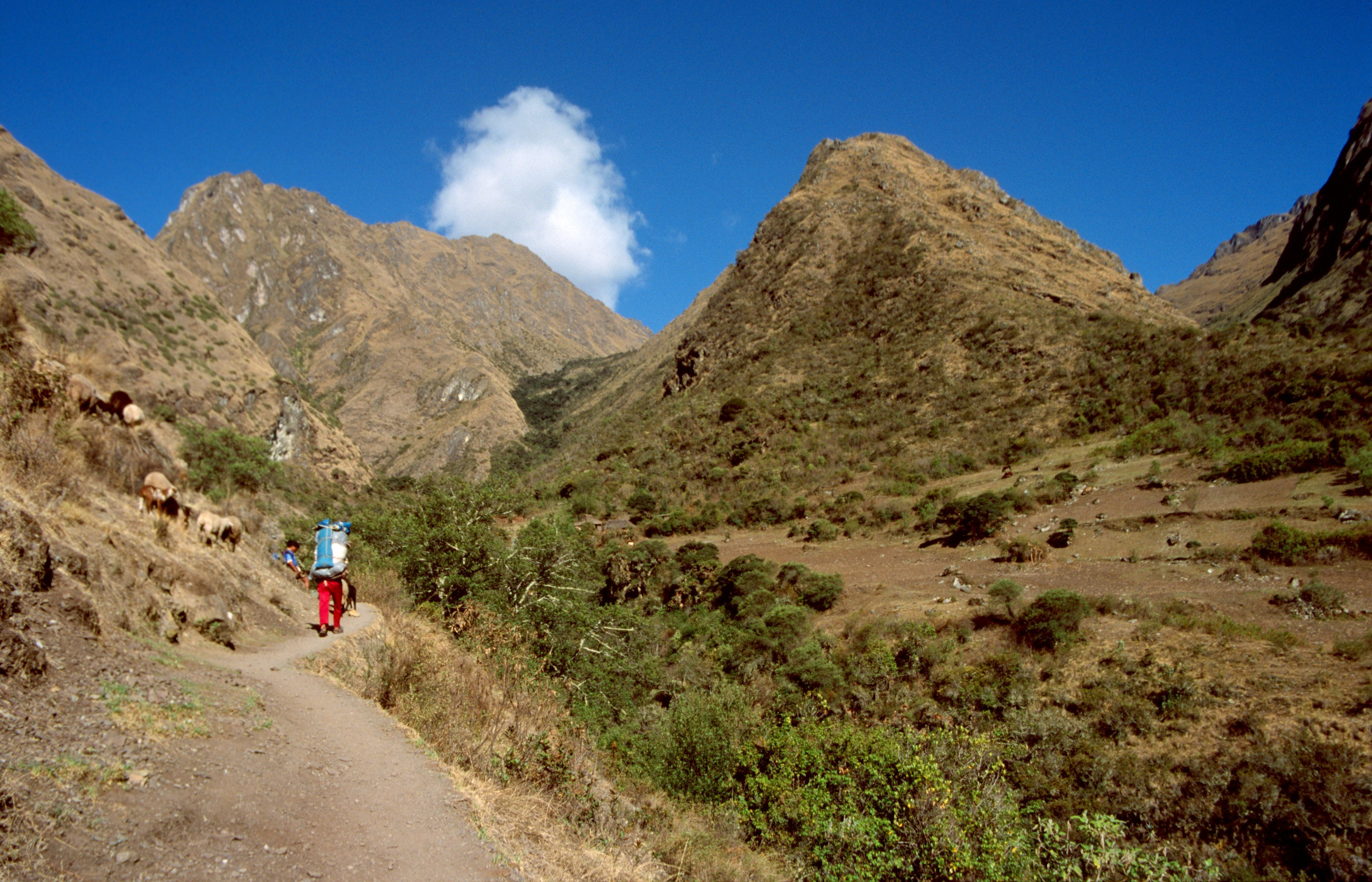
Ascent to Warmi Wañusqa

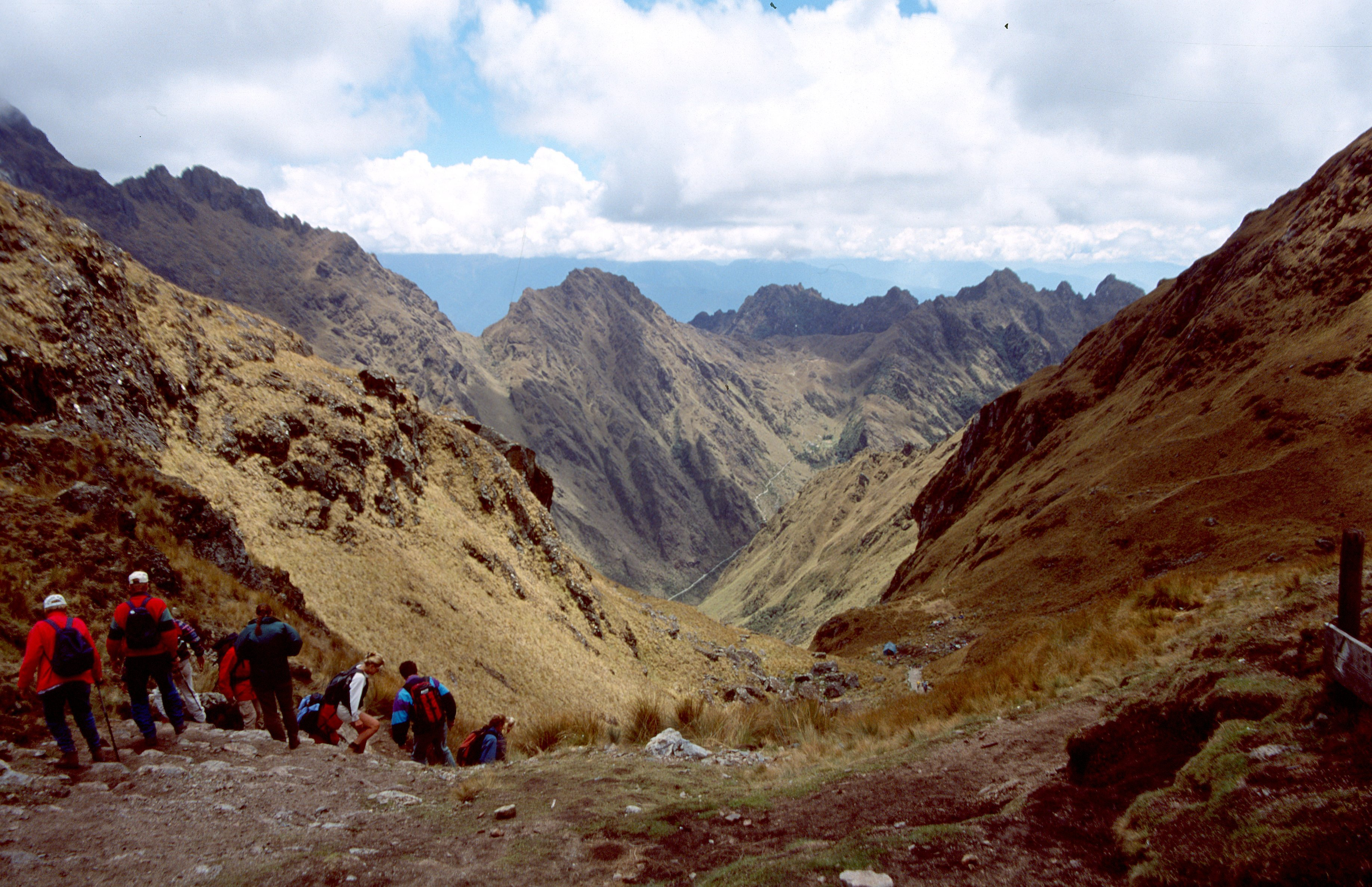
Descent from Warmi Wañusqa

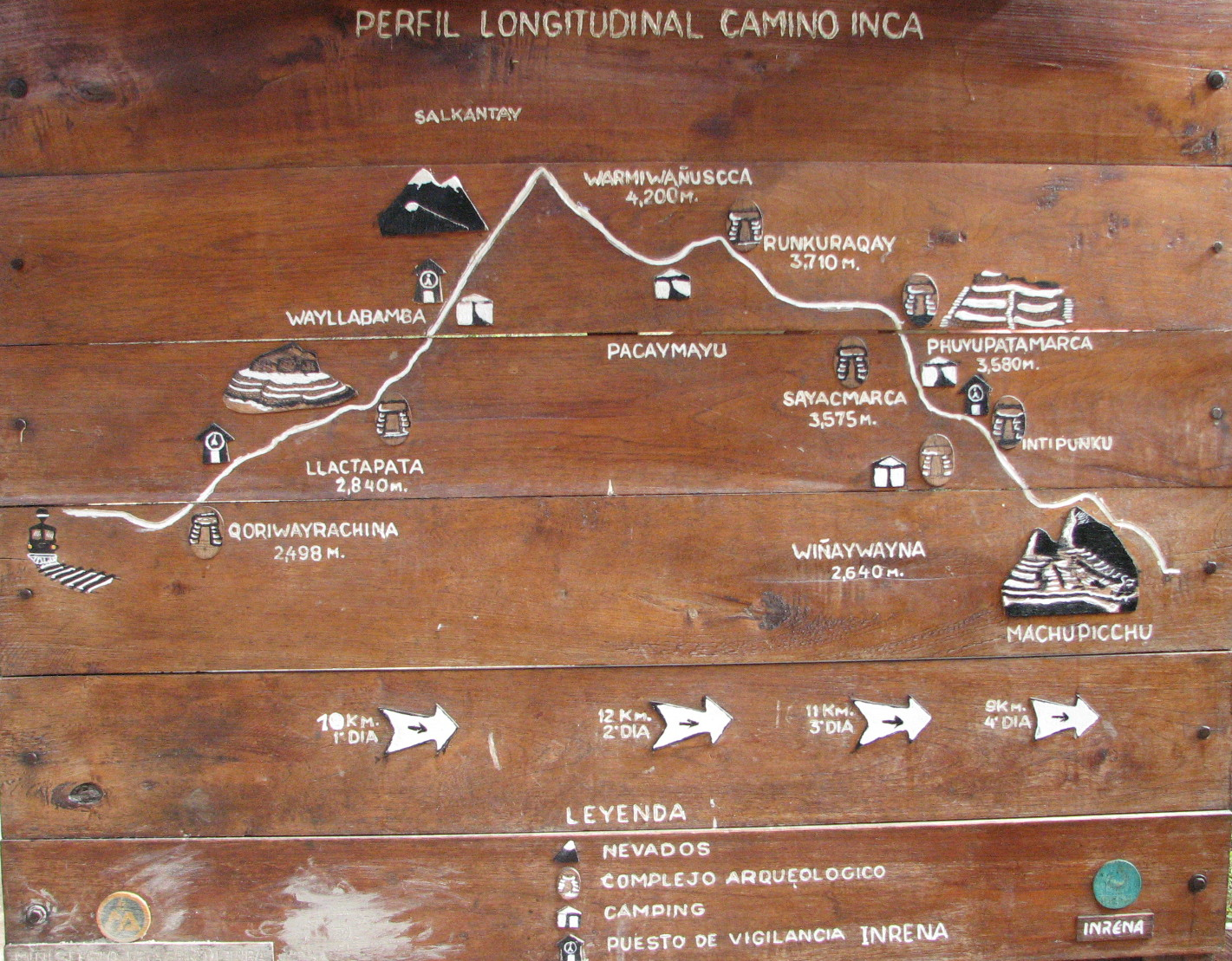
Plan

Warmi Wañusqa (Quechua warmi woman, wife, wañuy die, -sqa a suffix (wañusqa died, dead), "woman who died" or "woman died", also spelled Huarmihuanusca, Huarmihuañusca, Warmihuañusca, Warmihuanuscca, Warmiwañusca, Warmiwañuscca, Warmi Wanusca) is a mountain pass in the Cusco Region in Peru. It is located in the Urubamba Province, Machupicchu District. Warmi Wañusqa lies on the Inca Trail to Machu Picchu, southwest of the archaeological site of Patallaqta. It is situated at a height of 4,200 metres (13,780 ft).

== See also ==
- Inti Punku
- Phuyupata Marka
- Qunchamarka
- Runkuraqay
- Wiñay Wayna
