= Runkuraqay =

Archaeological site in Peru

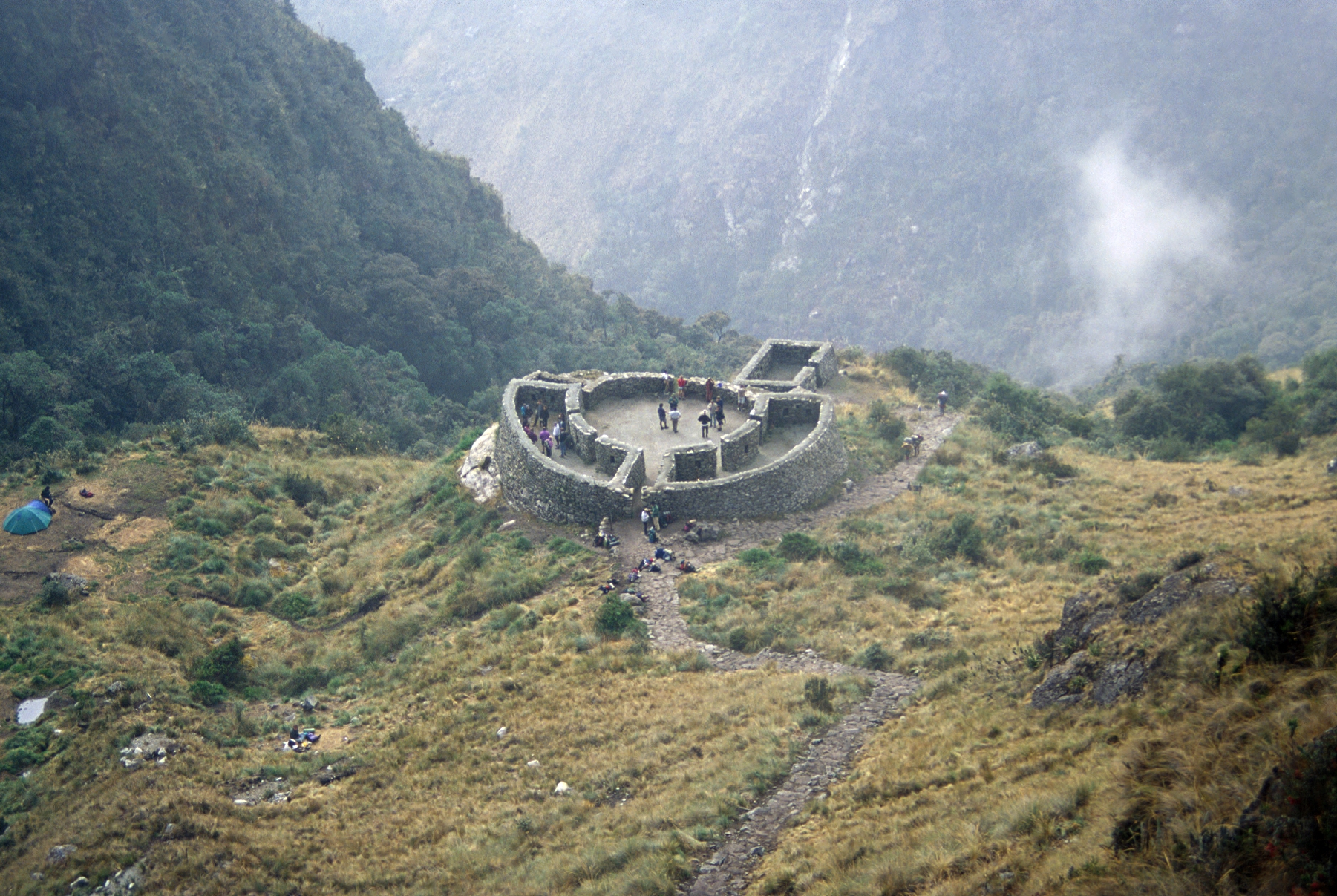

- Location within Peru
- 13°13′42″S 72°30′05″W
- Cultures: Inca
- Location: Peru
- Region: Cusco Region

Runkuraqay or Runku Raqay (Quechua runku basket, raqay shed / derelict house / ruin) is an archaeological site on a mountain of the same name in Peru located in the Cusco Region, Urubamba Province, Machupicchu District. It is situated southeast of the archaeological site Machu Picchu and south of the Vilcanota river. The ruins lie on the southern slope of the mountain Runkuraqay near the Runkuraqay pass, northeast of the archaeological site Sayacmarca and southeast of the site Qunchamarka.

Hiram Bingham III visited the site in April 1915. Paul Fejos visited in 1940.

== Gallery ==
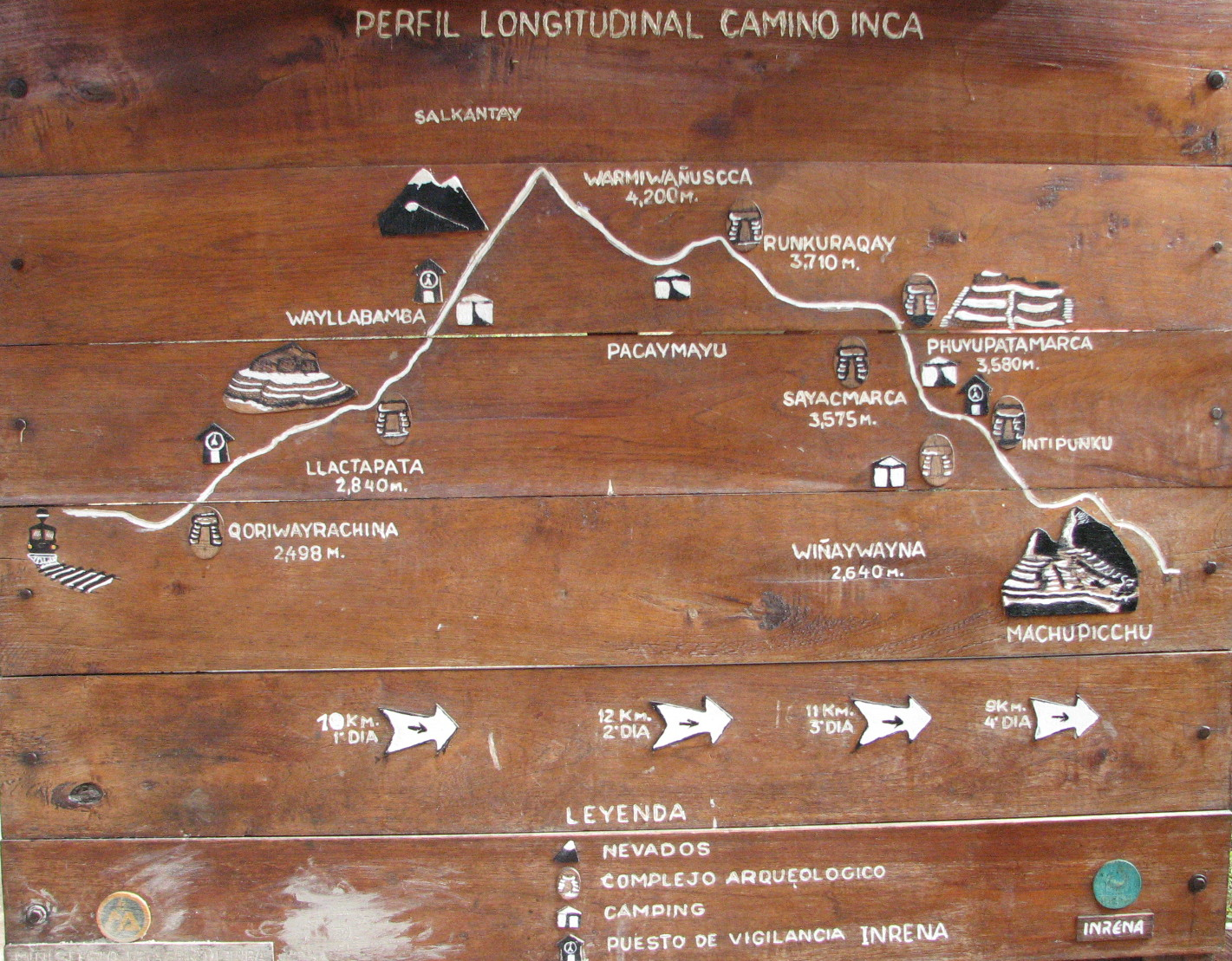
Location of Runkuraqay as shown on a sign near Willkaraqay

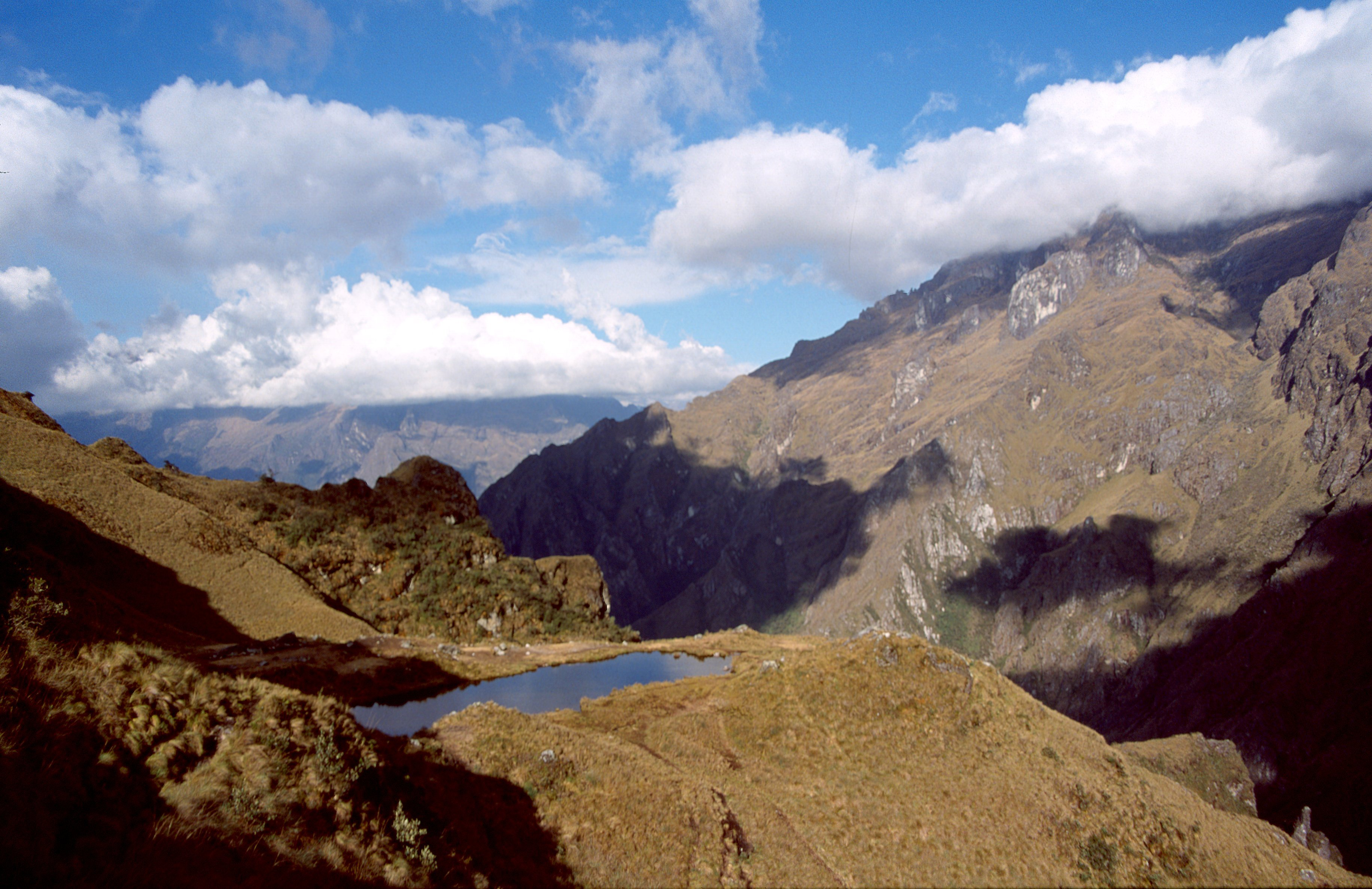
At the Runkuraqay pass

== See also ==
- Inti Punku
- Patallaqta
- Phuyupatamarka
- Warmi Wañusqa
- Willkaraqay
