= Huillca Raccay =

Archaeological site in Peru

- Willkaraqay
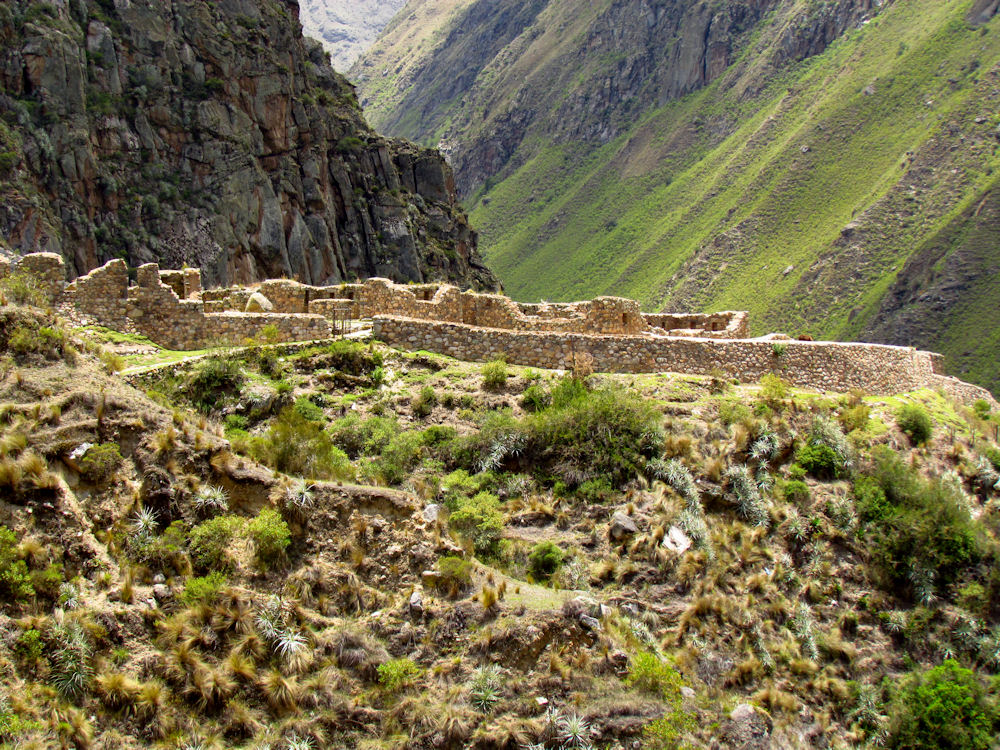
- The ruins of Huillca Raccay
- Interactive map of Huillca Raccay
- Cultures: Inca
- Location: Peru
- Region: Cusco Region

Huillca Raccay or Huillca Racay (also Willkaraqay or Willka Raqay) (possibly from Quechua willka grandchild / great-grandson / lineage / minor god in the Inca culture, an image of the Vilcanota valley worshipped as God / holy, sacred, divine, willka or wilka Anadenanthera colubrina (a tree), raqay ruin, a demolished building / shed, storehouse or dormitory for the laborers of a farm / a generally old building without roof, only with walls,) is an archaeological site in Peru located in the Cusco Region, Urubamba Province, Ollantaytambo District. It is situated southeast of the archaeological site Patallacta above the right bank of the little river Pampa Qhawa, an affluent of the Vilcanota River, near the village Chamana.

== See also ==
- Inti Punku
- Puyupatamarca
- Runkuraqay
- Warmiwañusqa
