= Pakaymayu =

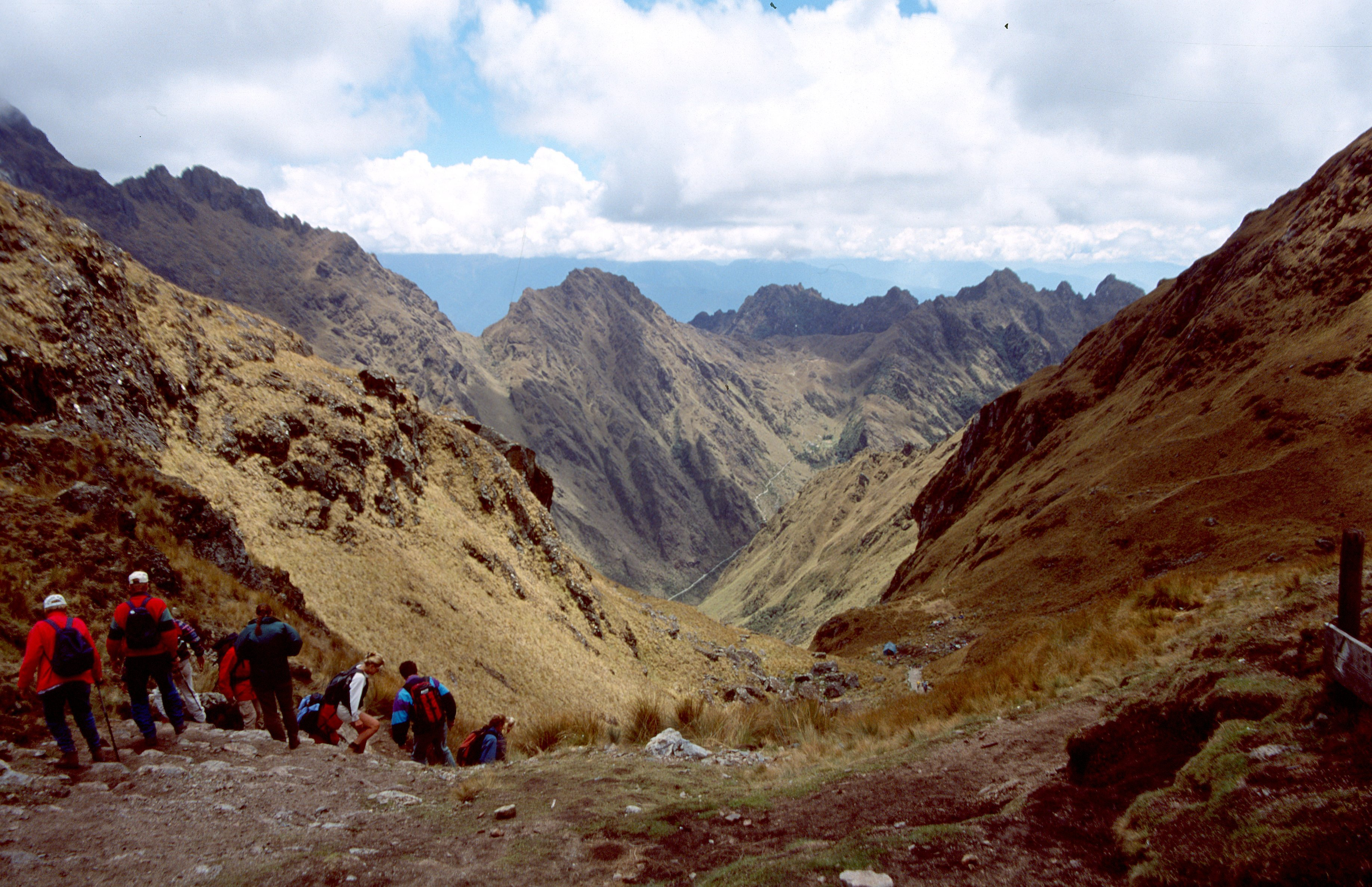
- The Pakaymayu valley as seen from Warmi Wañusqa pass
- Etymology: Quechua

Location
- Country: Peru
- Region: Cusco Region

Physical characteristics
- Mouth: Willkanuta River

The Pakaymayu or Paqaymayu (Quechua, Hispanicized spellings Pacaymayo, Pacaymayu, also Pacamayo) is a river in Peru located in the Cusco Region, Urubamba Province, Machupicchu District. It is a left tributary of the Willkanuta River.

The Pakaymayu originates in the Willkapampa mountain range northeast of Sallqantay and north of P'allqay (Paljay) near the Warmi Wañusqa pass, the archaeological site of Runkuraqay and the Runkuraqay pass. Its direction is mainly to the northeast, almost parallel to the Kusichaka River east of it. The confluence with the Willkanuta River is west of the village of Pampa Q'awa (Pampacahua).
