= Inti Punku =

Archaeological site in Peru

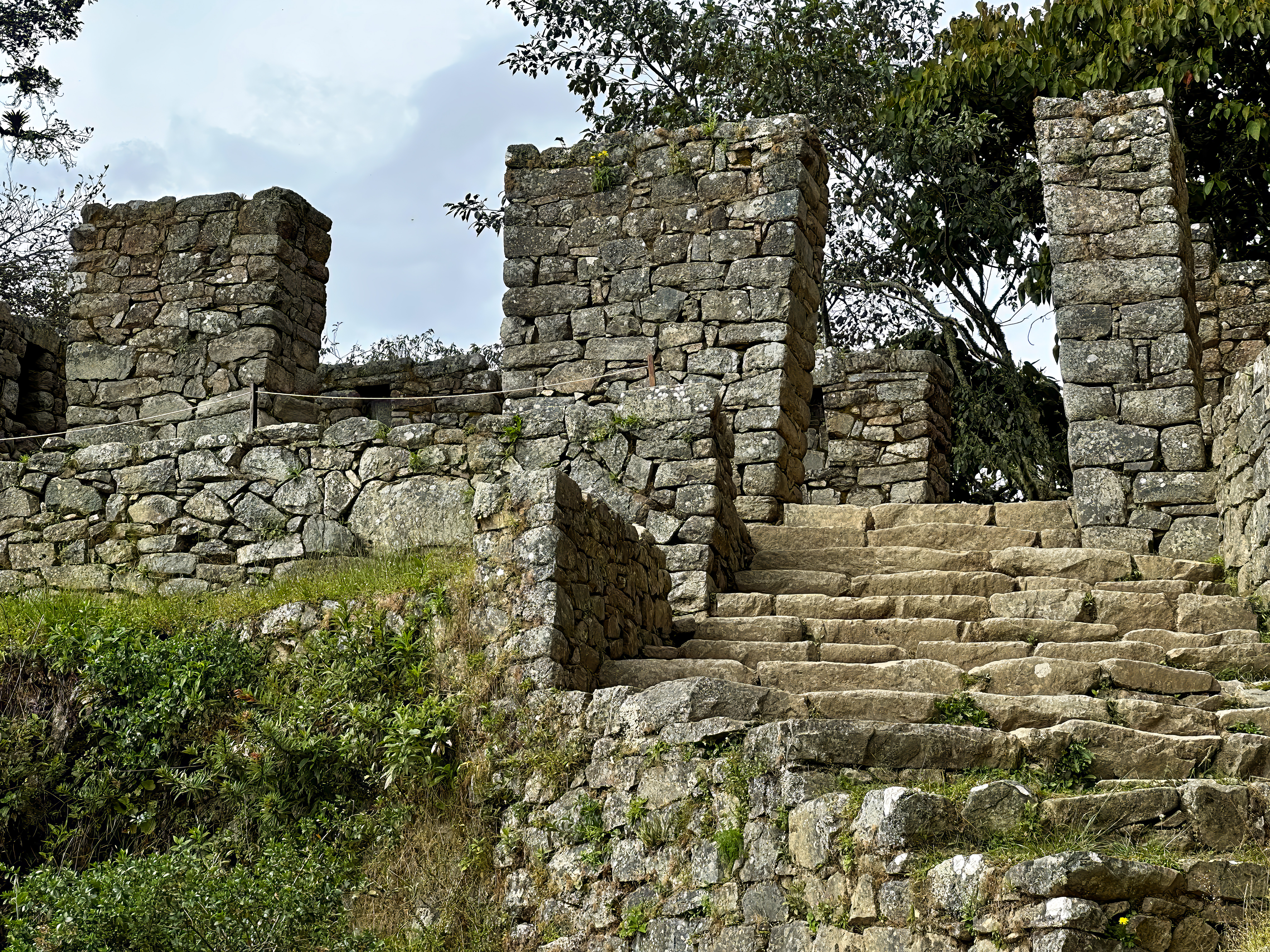
- Inti Punku in 2025
- Interactive map of Inti Punku
- 13.169759°S 72.533949°W
- Cultures: Inca
- Location: Peru, Cusco Region
- Region: Andes

Inti Punku or Intipunku (Quechua inti sun, punku door, "sun gate", Hispanicized spellings Intipunco, Intipuncu, Inti Puncu) is an archaeological site in the Cusco Region of Peru that was once a fortress of the sacred city, Machu Picchu. It is now also the name of the final section of the Incan Trail between the Sun Gate complex and the city of Machu Picchu. It was believed that the steps were a control gate for those who entered and exited the Sanctuary.

It is one of the most important archaeological constructions around the Machu Picchu site. Inti Punku was once the main entrance to Machu Picchu, in particular it was the primary approach from the then capital city of Cusco to the southeast. The gate likely would have been protected by Incan military. Inti Punku is dedicated to the cult of the Inti, the Sun god. Because of its location on a ridge southeast of Machu Picchu, the rising sun would pass through the Sun Gate each year on the summer solstice. It is located 2,745 m (9,006 ft) above sea level. The altitude of the climb to Inti Punku from Machu Picchu is 290 m (950 ft). It is a wide archaeological site with windows and gates that are held up by terraces. This is the first place that tourists can see the whole sanctuary. Tourists are able to see the sun rise over the mountains by Machu Picchu.

== Route description ==
The route covers a distance of approximately a mile, eventually rising above the ruins of Machu Picchu. The ruins themselves serve as a final stop for hikers completing an optional five-day hike from a point far back from Aguas Calientes, the city at the base of Machu Picchu. This hike has been recommended by many tour guides as giving a great view of the city of Machu Picchu.

In order to get to Inti Punku, the Inca Trail must be trekked, which takes about three to four hours round trip to complete. There are visible signs throughout the Inca Trail indicating directions of the Sun Gate. From the Sun Gate, the Machu Picchu Mountain, Huayna Picchu Mountain, Vilcabamba/Urubamba River, and Putukusi Mountain are all visible.

Although the trail to Inti Punku is open all year, there is more rainfall from November to April. Due to the region's unpredictable weather, tourists are advised to be prepared with rain gear and sun protection.

== Gallery ==
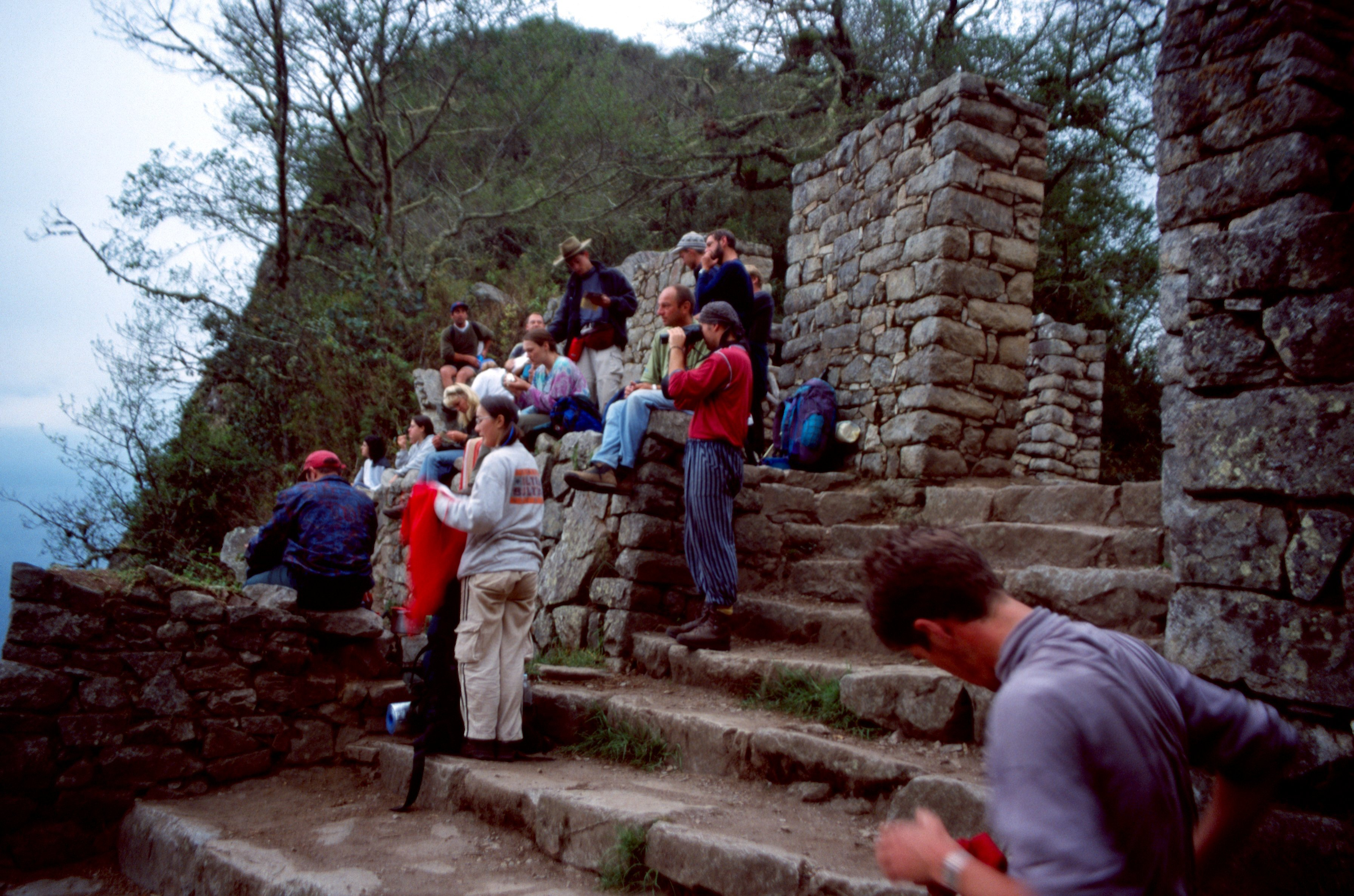
People waiting for the sunrise at Inti Punku

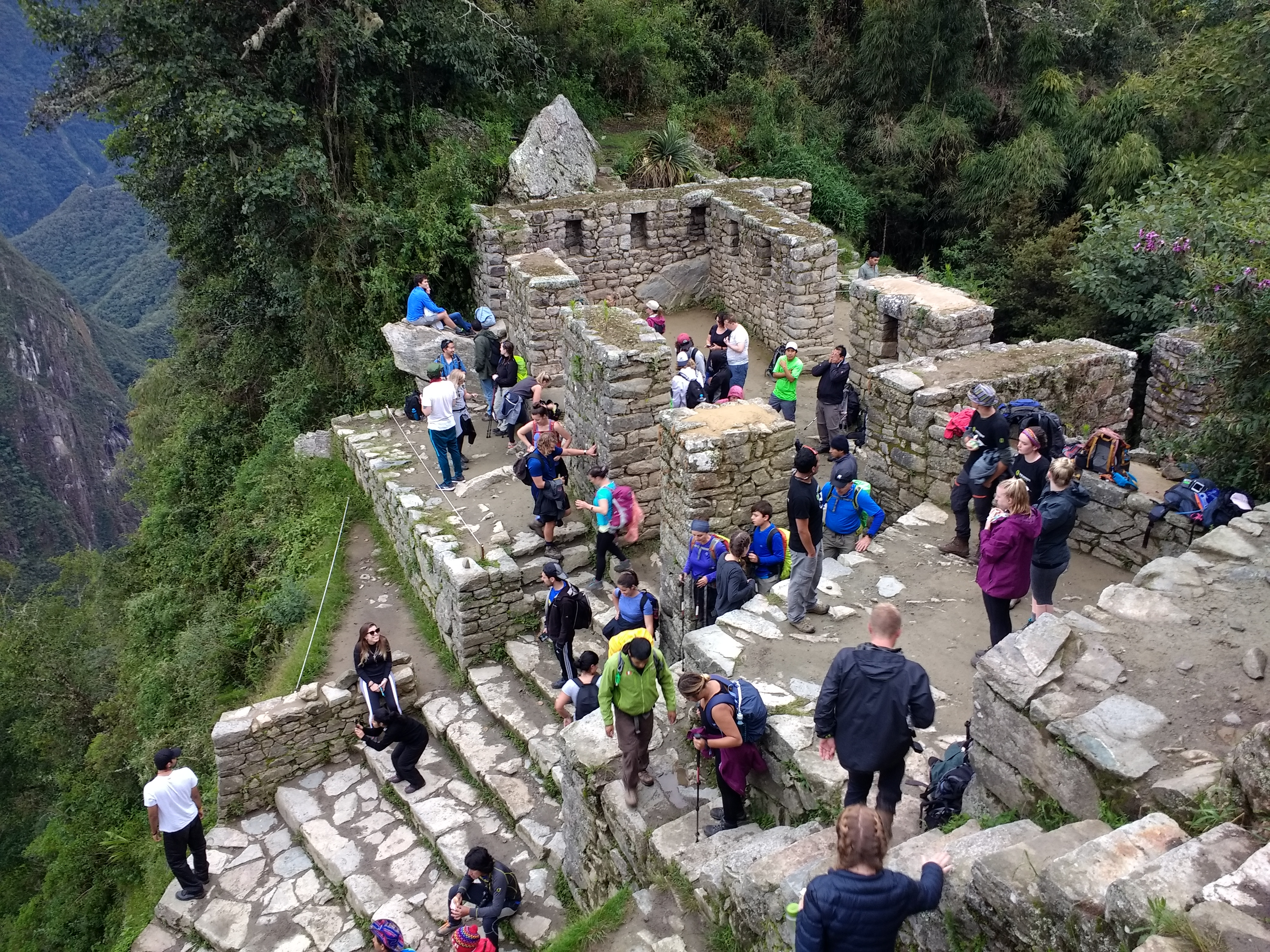
Top view of the Inti Punku

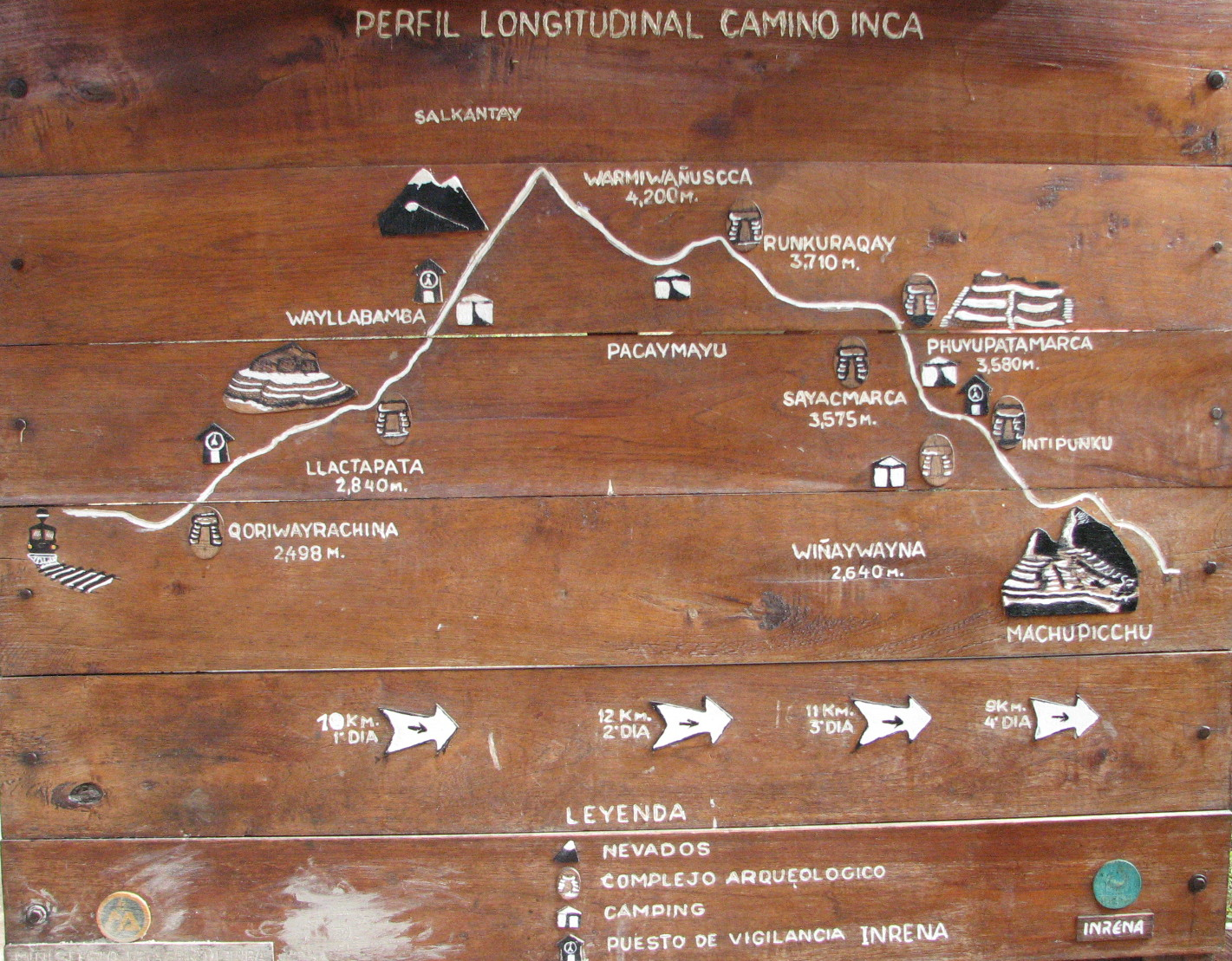
Sign at check-point near Willkaraqay showing the location of Inti Punku

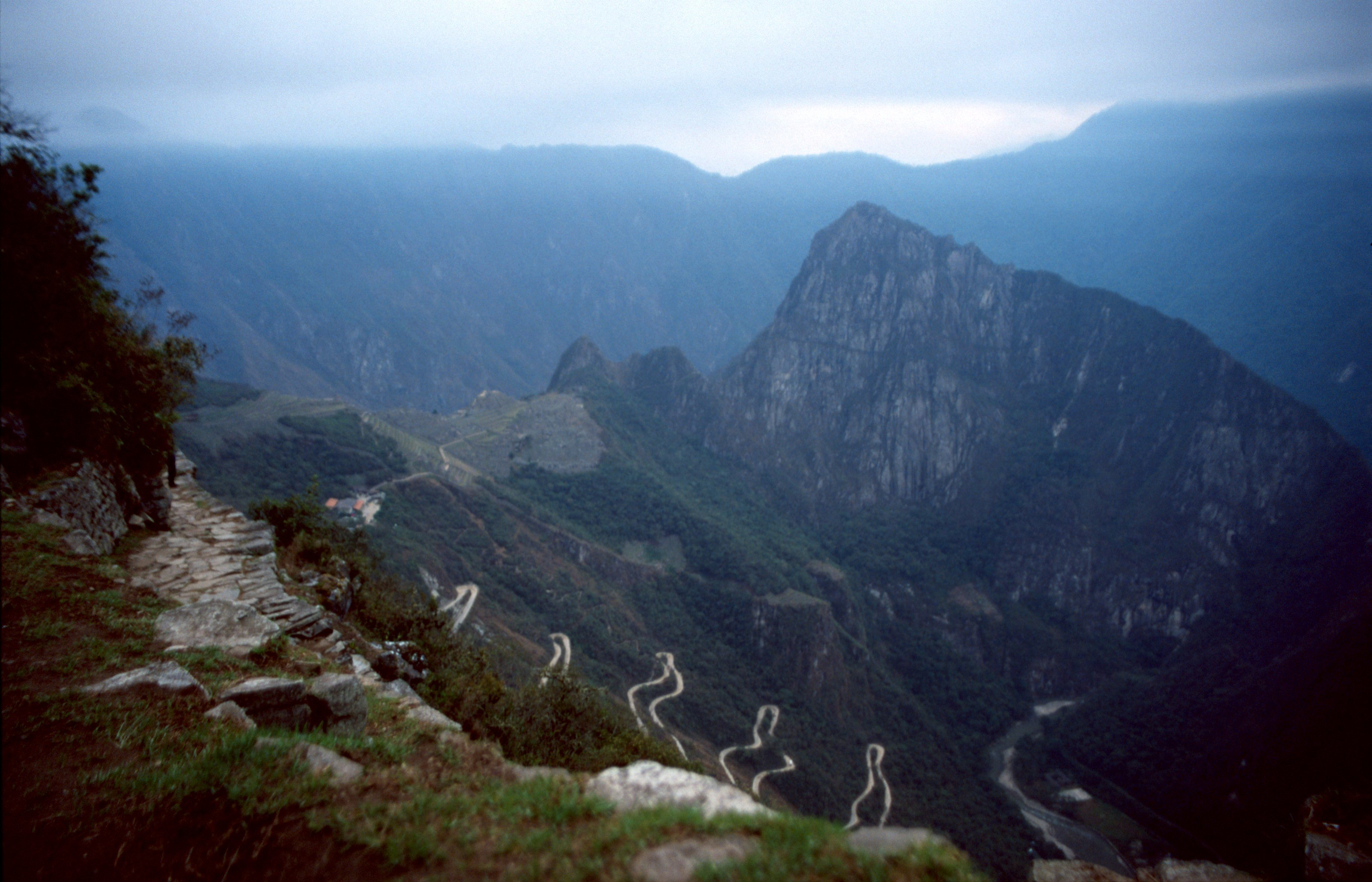
First view of Machu Picchu before sunrise from Inti Punku

== See also ==
- Patallaqta
- Phuyupatamaka
- Runkuraqay
- Warmiwañusqa
- Willkaraqay
