= Patallacta =

Archaeological site in Peru

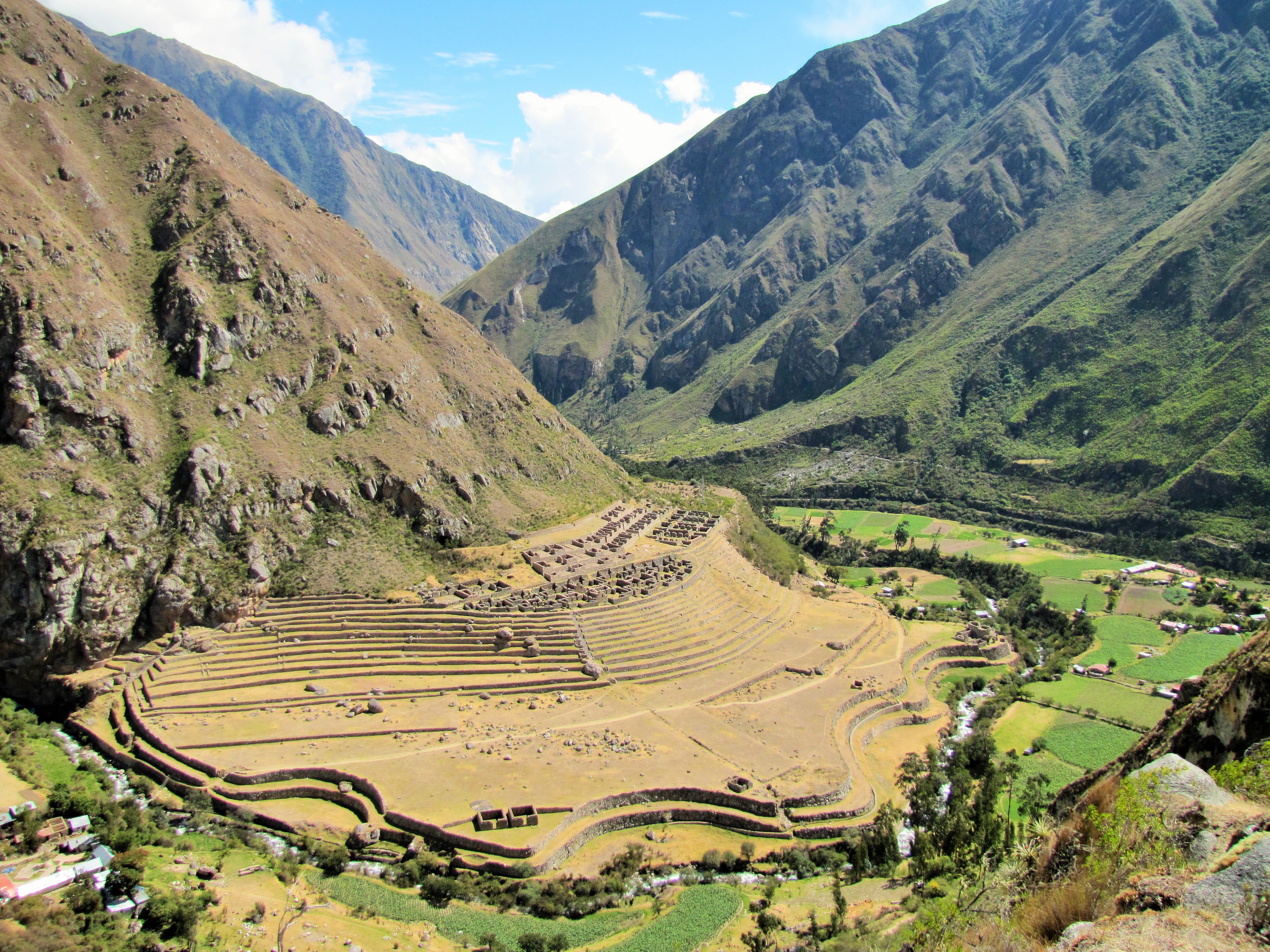
- Patallacta viewed from above on the Inca trail near Willkaraqay

- Location within Peru
- 13°13′53″S 72°25′53″W
- Type: Settlement
- Cultures: Inca
- Location: Peru, Cusco Region, Urubamba Province, Machupicchu District
- Region: Andes

Patallacta (possibly from Quechua pata elevated place / above, at the top / edge, bank (of a river), shore, llaqta place (village, town, city, country, nation), "settlement on a platform" pronounced "pahta-yakta"), Llactapata or Q'ente Marka (possibly from Quechua q'inti hummingbird, marka village, "hummingbird village") is an archaeological site in Peru located in the Cusco Region, Urubamba Province, Machupicchu District. It is situated southeast of the site Machu Picchu, at the confluence of the rivers Cusichaca and Vilcanota on a mountain named Patallacta.

On his way to Machu Picchu (at: 13°13′57″S 72°25′30″W) Hiram Bingham, discoverer of many Incan sites, passed Patallacta, sometimes given the name of Llaqtapata as evidenced by the photograph of a sign from a check-point along the Inca trail. His associate Mr. Herman Tucker reported that the name of the town was Patallacta containing about one hundred houses. Above it were several important sites including Huayllabamba. This site is located 1.5 km (1 mi) away from the start of the "Classic Inca Trail".

This site housed many occupants, including travellers and soldiers who manned the nearby "hill fort" of Willkaraqay, and a shrine with rounded walls known as Pulpituyuq that had religious and ceremonial functions.

Patallacta was burned by Manco Inca Yupanqui, who destroyed a number of settlements along the Inca road system during his retreat from Cusco in 1536 to discourage Spanish pursuit. In part due to these efforts, the Spanish never discovered the Inca Trail to Machu Picchu or any of its settlements.

== Gallery ==
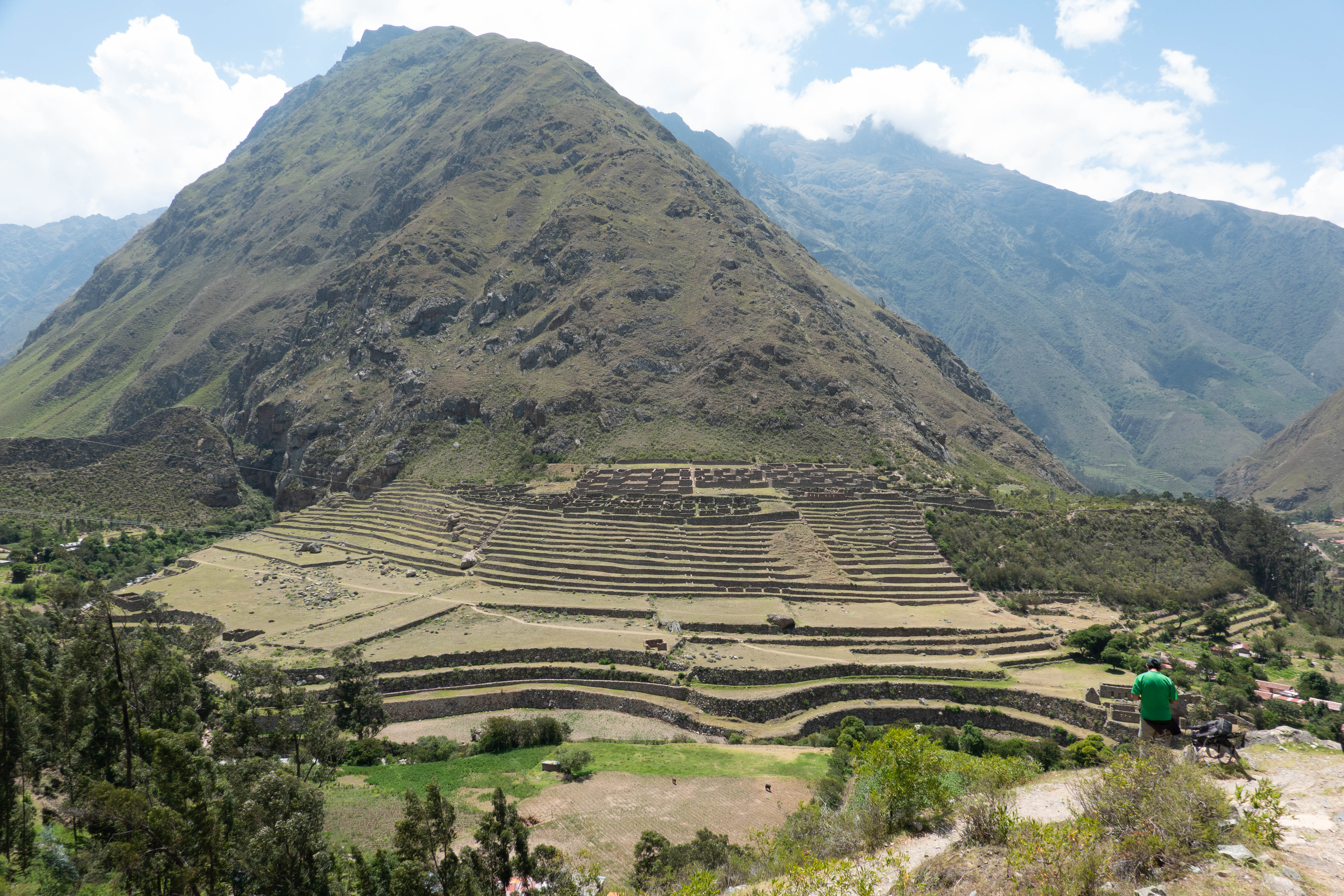
Patallacta

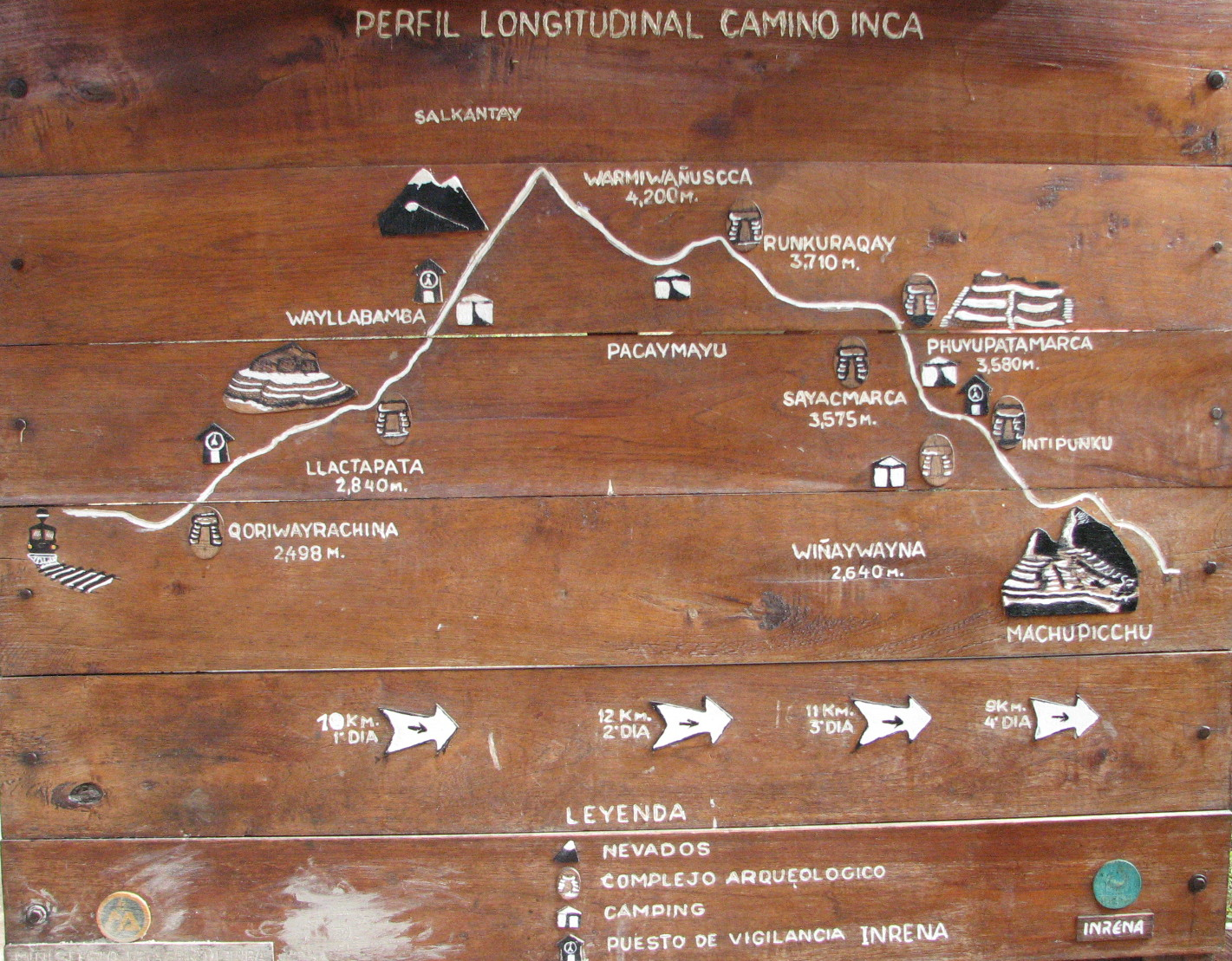
Sign at check-point near Willkaraqay identifying Patallacta as Llactapata

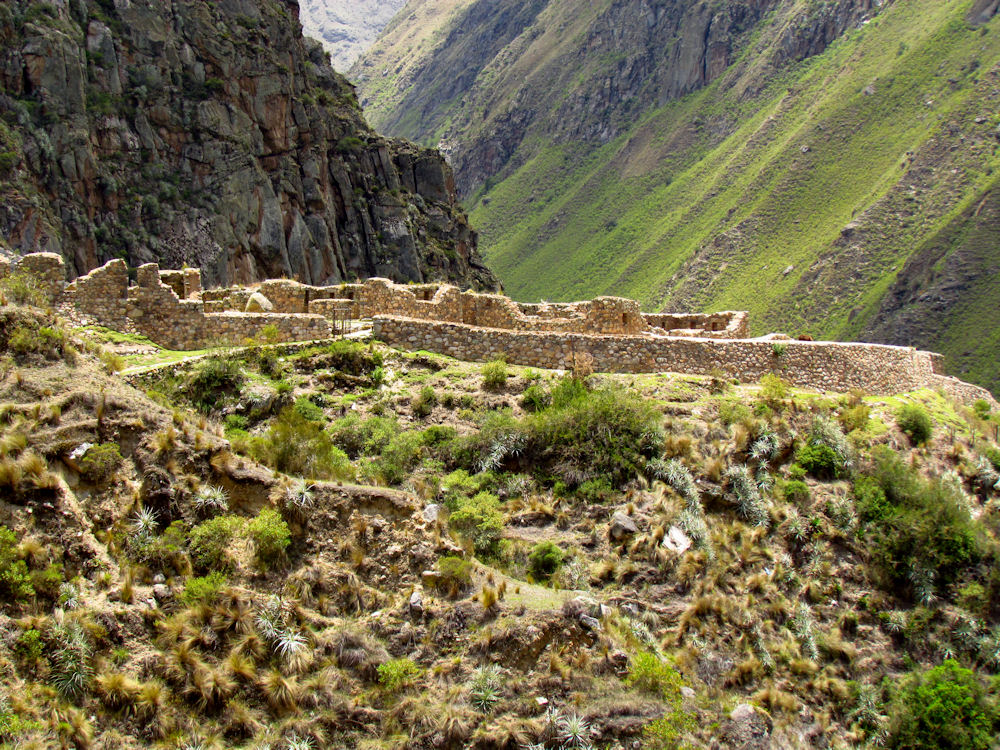
Willkaraqay ruins on hill above Patallacta

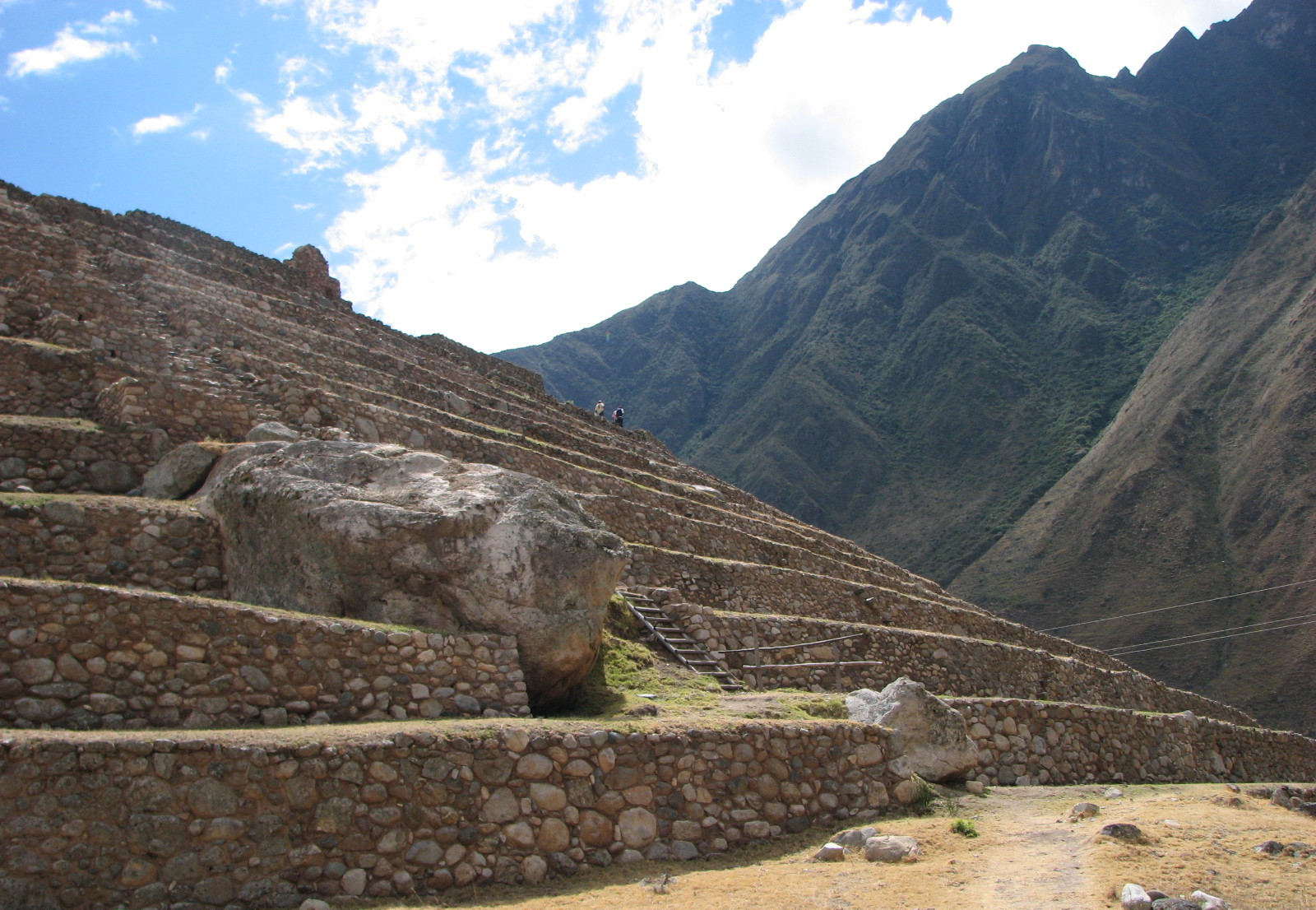
Workers are dwarfed by terraces, which are in turn dwarfed by the surrounding mountains

== See also ==
- Inti Punku
- Machu Q'inti
- Wayna Q'inti
