= Wiñay Wayna =

Archaeological site in Peru

- Huiñay Huayna
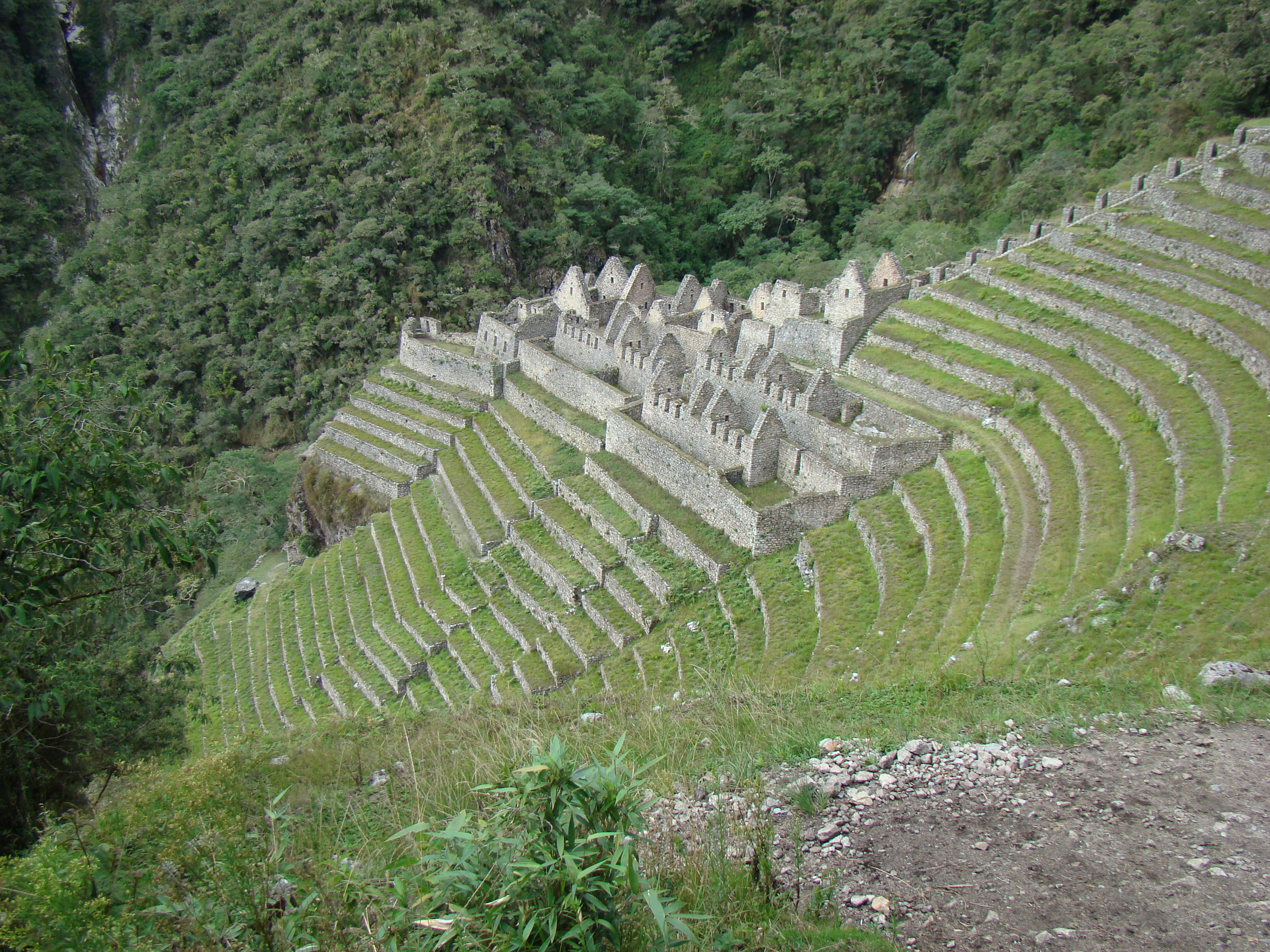
- View of Wiñay Wayna

- Location within Peru
- 13°11′34″S 72°32′11″W
- Type: Settlement
- Location: Cusco Region, Peru
- Region: Andes

Wiñay Wayna (2650 m) (Quechua for "forever young", Hispanicized spelling Huiñay Huayna) is an Inca ruin along the Inca Trail to Machu Picchu. It is built into a steep hillside overlooking the Urubamba River. The site consists of upper and lower house complexes connected by a staircase and fountain structures. Above and below the houses the people built areas of agricultural terraces or andenes, which are still visible.

A camp site for hikers with the same name is located in the vicinity and is usually used as the last overnight camping site for hikers undertaking the classical Inca Trail.

== Gallery ==
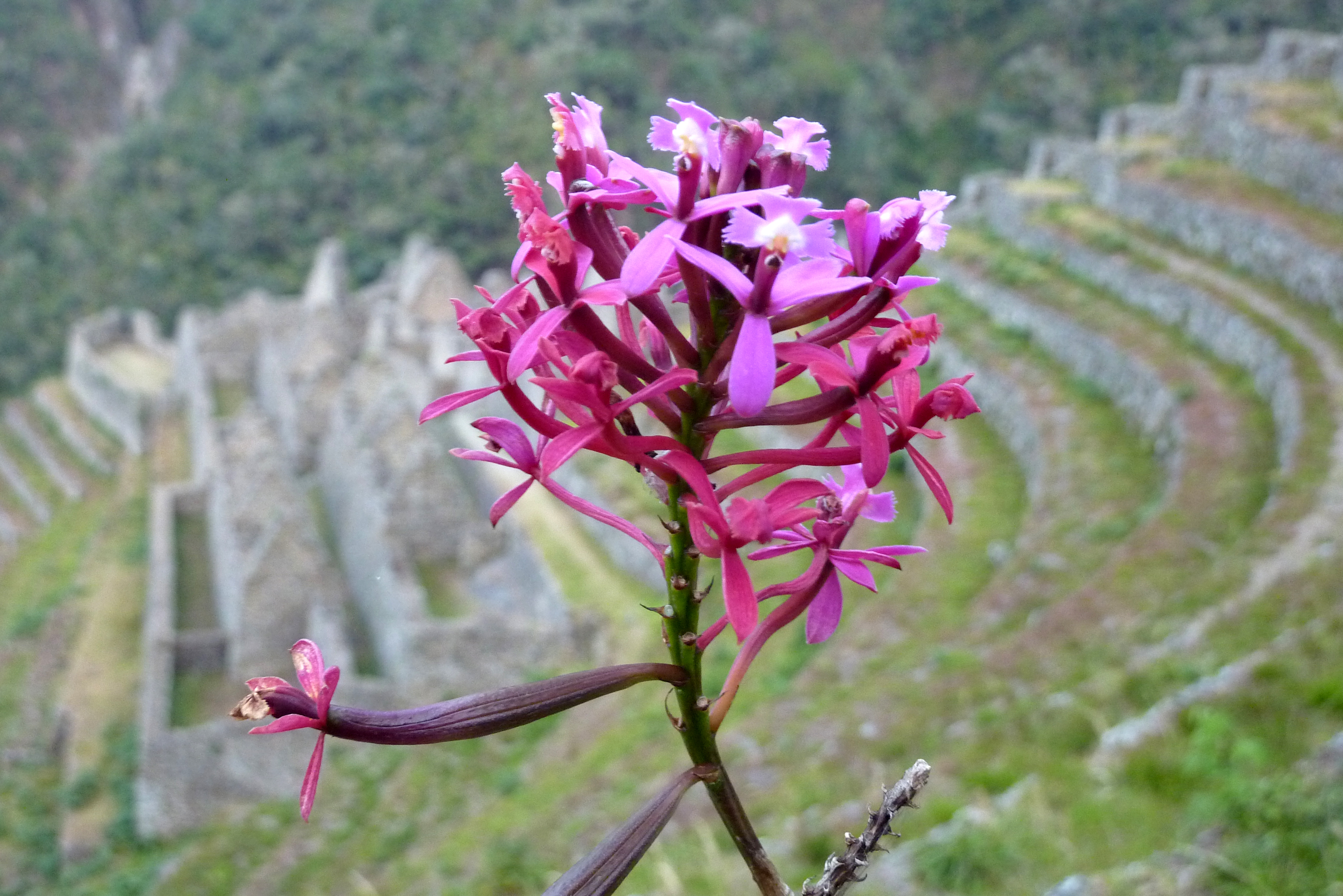
Epidendrum secundum, commonly called "Wiñay Wayna", in front of the ruins

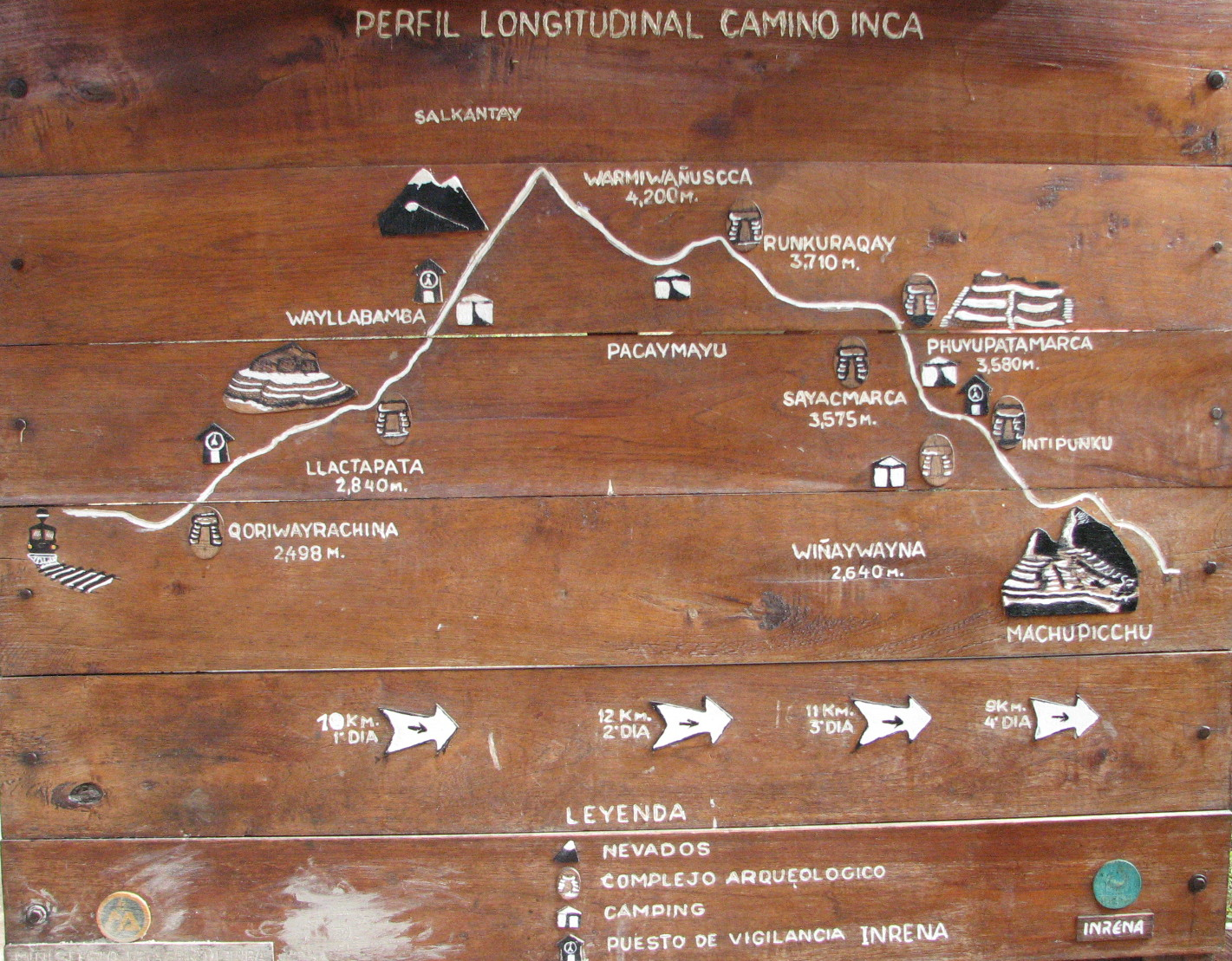
Location of Wiñay Wayna as shown on a sign near Willkaraqay

== See also ==
- List of archaeological sites in Peru
