= Puyupatamarca =

Archaeological site in Peru

Coordinates: 13.2064°S 72.5318°W

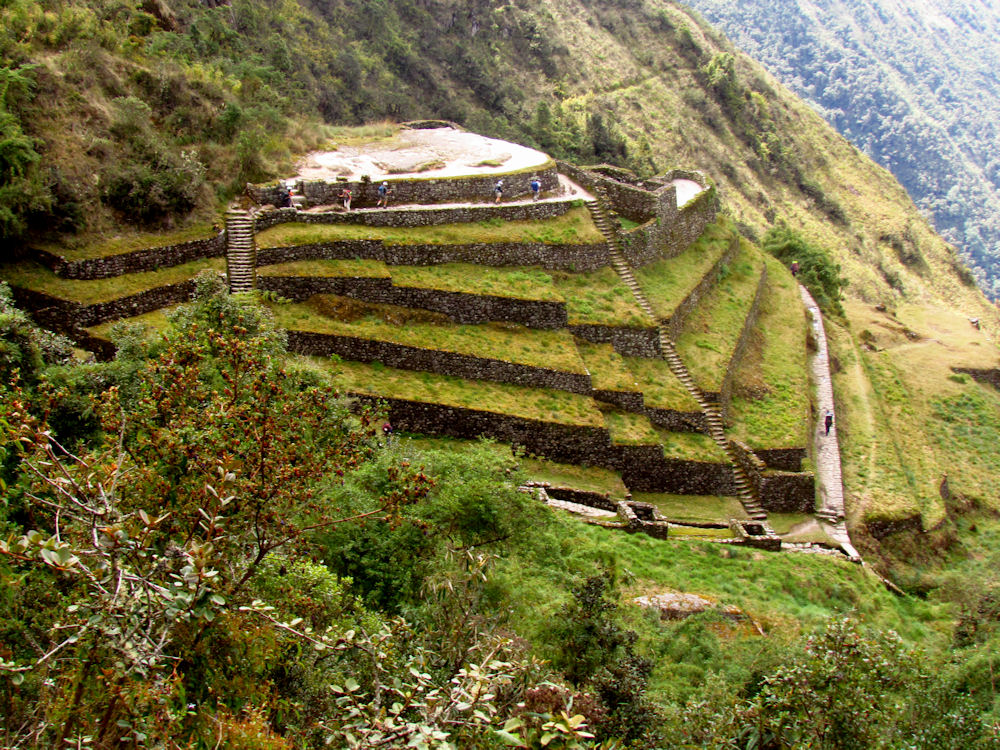
Inca trail to Machu Picchu

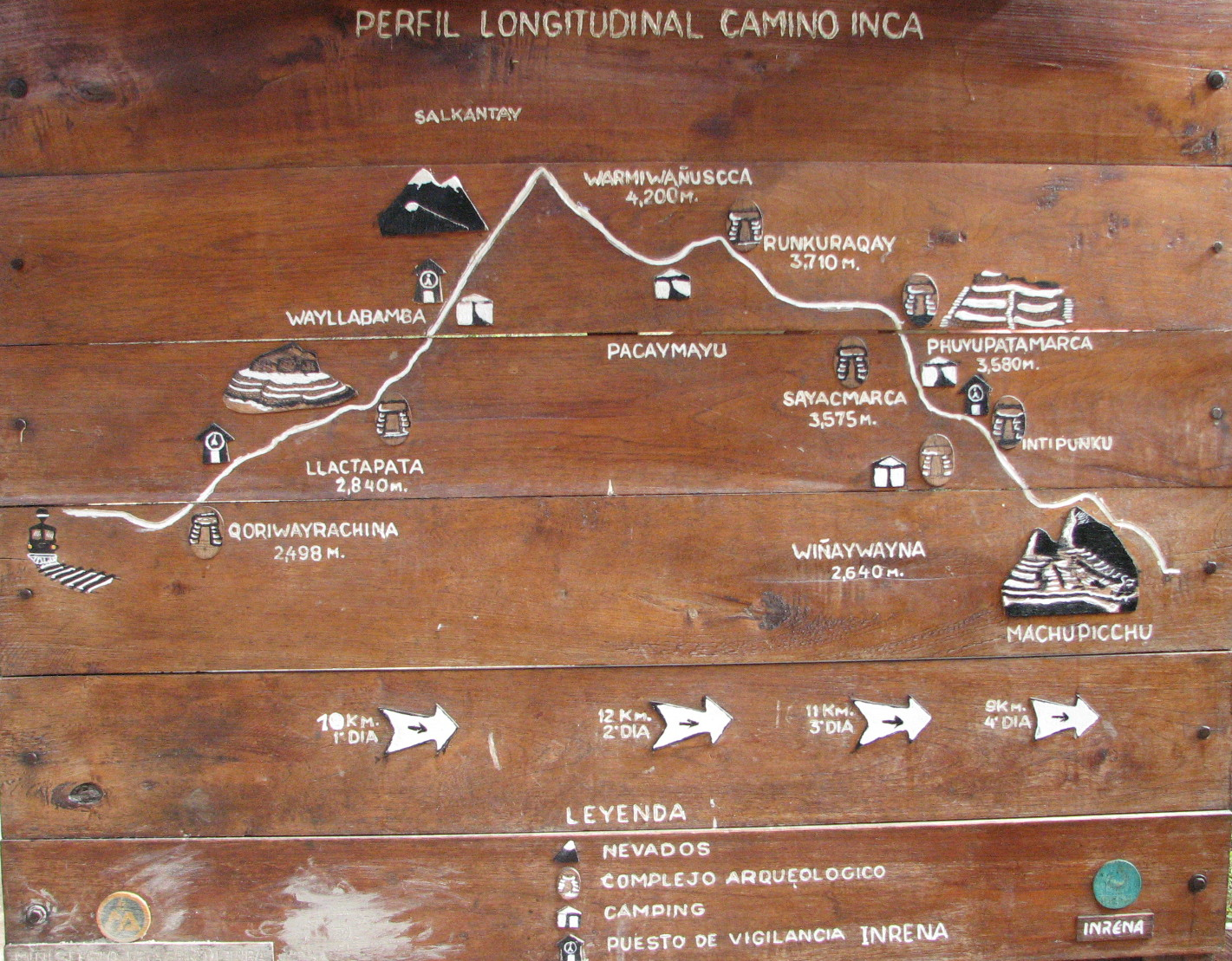
Location of Puyupatamarca as shown on a sign near Willkaraqay

Puyupatamarca or Phuyupatamarca is an archaeological site along the Inca Trail in the Urubamba Valley of Peru. Due to its altitude of roughly 3600 meters, it is known as "La Ciudad entre la Niebla" ("The City Above the Clouds"). It contains Inca ruins, with five small stone baths which during the wet season contain constant fresh running water.

== See also ==
- List of archaeological sites in Peru
