= Cusco Cathedral =

Cathedral in Peru

Coordinates: 13.5163°S 71.9781°W

- Spanish: Catedral Basílica de la Virgen de la Asunción del Cusco
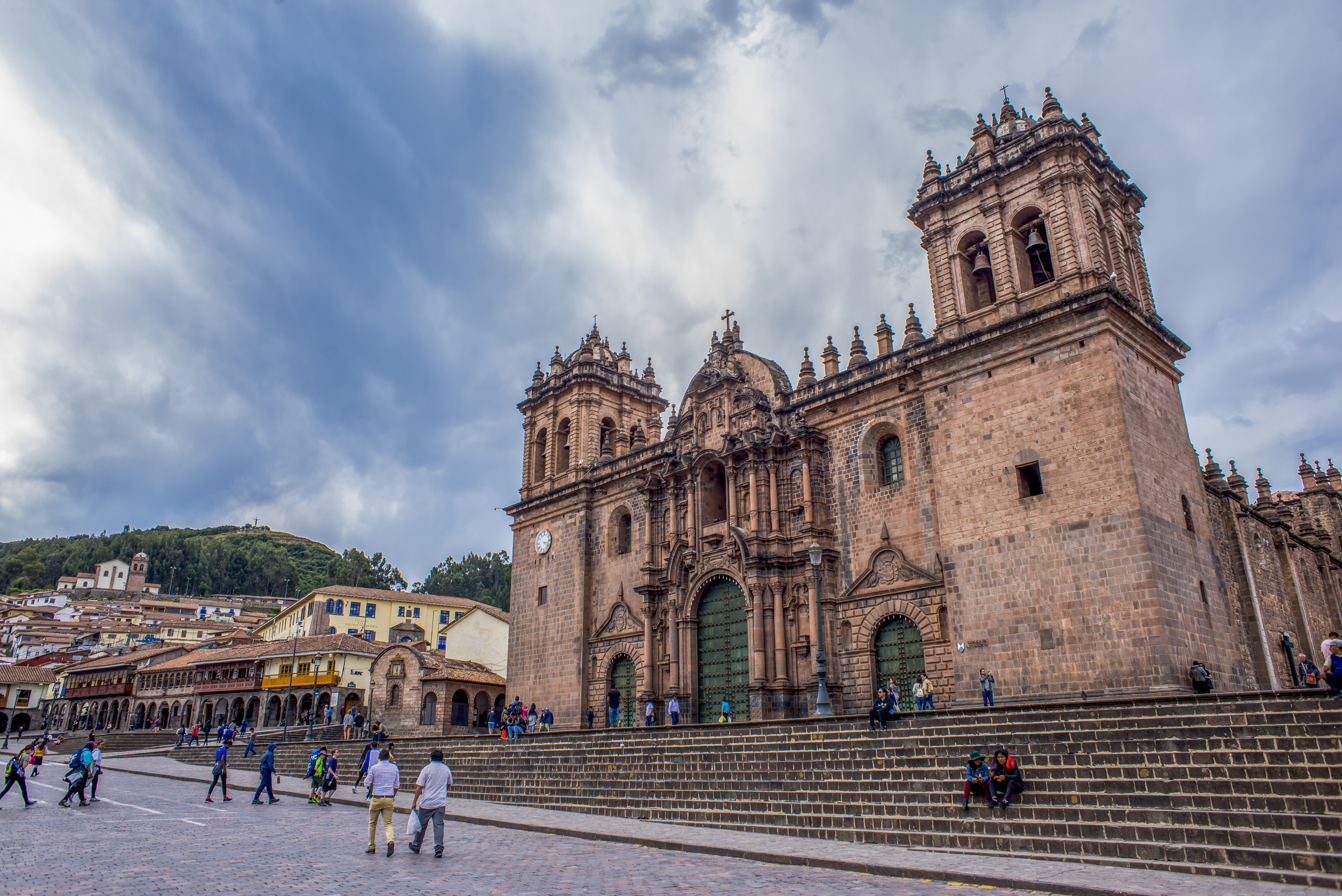
- Cusco Cathedral.

Religion
- Affiliation: Catholic Church
- Rite: Roman Rite
- Year consecrated: 1668
- Status: Active

Location
- Location: Cusco, Peru
- Interactive map of Cusco Cathedral

Architecture
- Architects: Juan Miguel de Veramendi, Juan Correa, Miguel Gutiérrez Sencio, Francisco Becerra
- Type: Basilica
- Style: Renaissance, late Gothic, Baroque, Plateresque
- Groundbreaking: 1559
- Completed: 1654

Specifications
- Direction of façade: Southwest
- Spire: 2
- Materials: Stone

UNESCO World Heritage Site
- Part of: City of Cuzco
- Criteria: Cultural: iii, iv
- Reference: 273
- Inscription: 1983 (7th Session)
- Area: Latin America and the Caribbean

Cultural Heritage of Peru
- Official name: Catedral de Cusco
- Type: Immovable tangible
- Criteria: Monument
- Designated: 28 December 1972; 53 years ago
- Legal basis: R.S. Nº 2900-72-ED

The Cathedral of Cusco (Spanish: Catedral de Cusco) or Cathedral Basilica of the Virgin of the Assumption (Spanish: Catedral Basílica de la Virgen de la Asunción) is the main temple of the city of Cusco, in Peru and houses the headquarters of the Archdiocese of Cusco. The Cathedral Basilica of Cusco, together with the Triunfo temple make up the Cathedral Complex, it is located in the northeast sector of the current Plaza de Armas of Cusco. In the place that, during the Inca period, was occupied by both the Suntor Wassi (lit. "Government House") and the Kiswarkancha or Palace of the eighth Inca Viracocha. The complex occupies an area of 3,920 square meters and is the most important religious monument in the Historic Center of Cusco.

Since 1972 the temple has been part of the Monumental Zone of Cusco declared as a Historical Monument of Peru. Also, in 1983, being part of the historic center of the city of Cusco, it is part of the central zone declared by UNESCO as World Heritage Site.

== History ==
=== Kiswarkancha ===
The Incas built the temple known as Kiswarkancha on the main square in Cusco. It was the Inca palace of Viracocha, ruler of the Kingdom of Cusco around a century before the Spanish colonists arrived. The aboriginal name of this city was Qusqu. Although it was used in Quechua, its origin has been found in the Aymara language. The word itself originated in the phrase qusqu wanka ("Rock of the owl"), attending to the foundational myth of the Ayar siblings.

Near to the Kiswarkancha was the Suntur Wasi, an armoury and heraldry centre for the Inca royalty. When the Spanish conquistadores arrived in Cuzco, they decided to take down the temple and build their Christian cathedral in that prominent site.

=== Basilica Cathedral of our Lady of Assumption ===
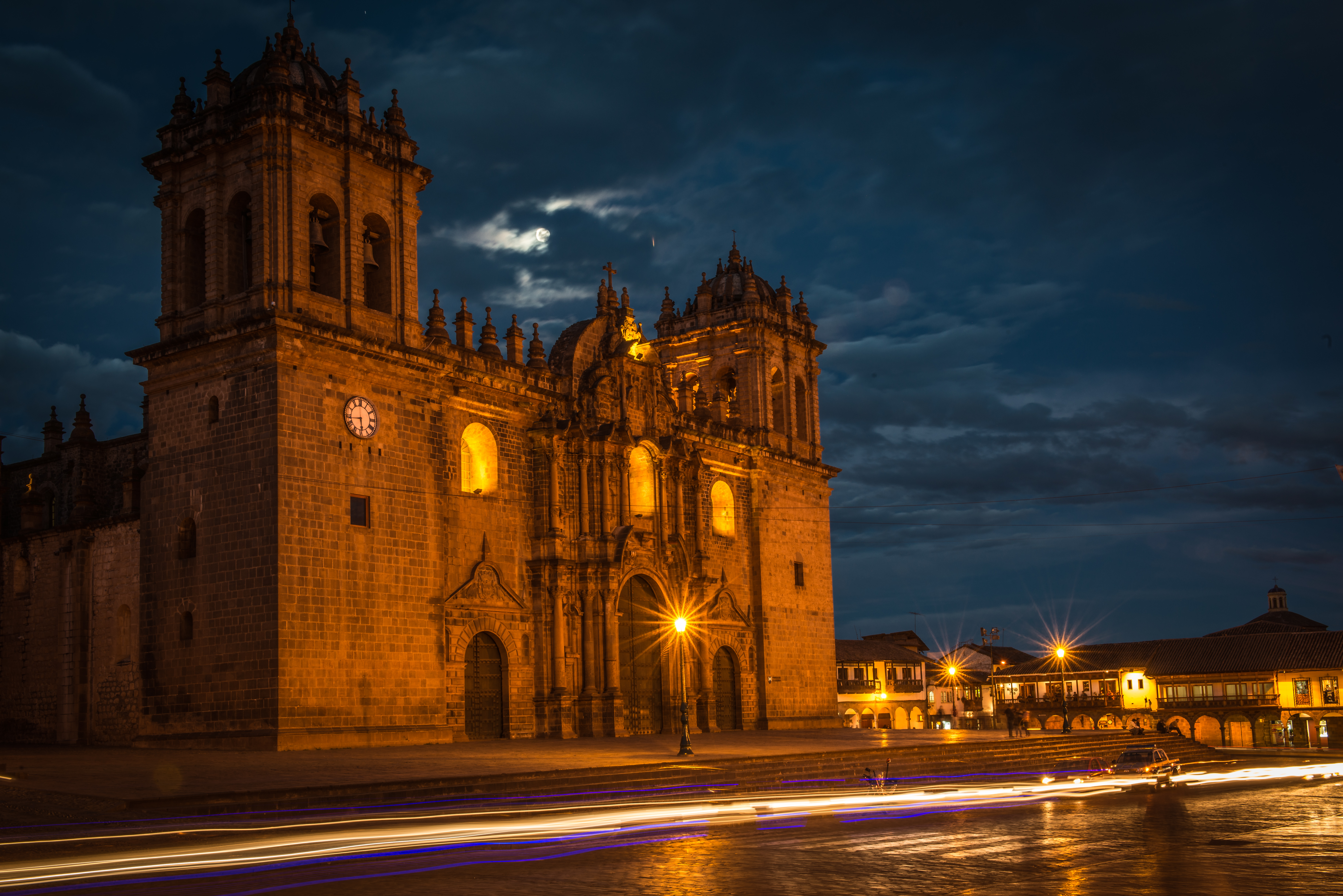
Nighttime

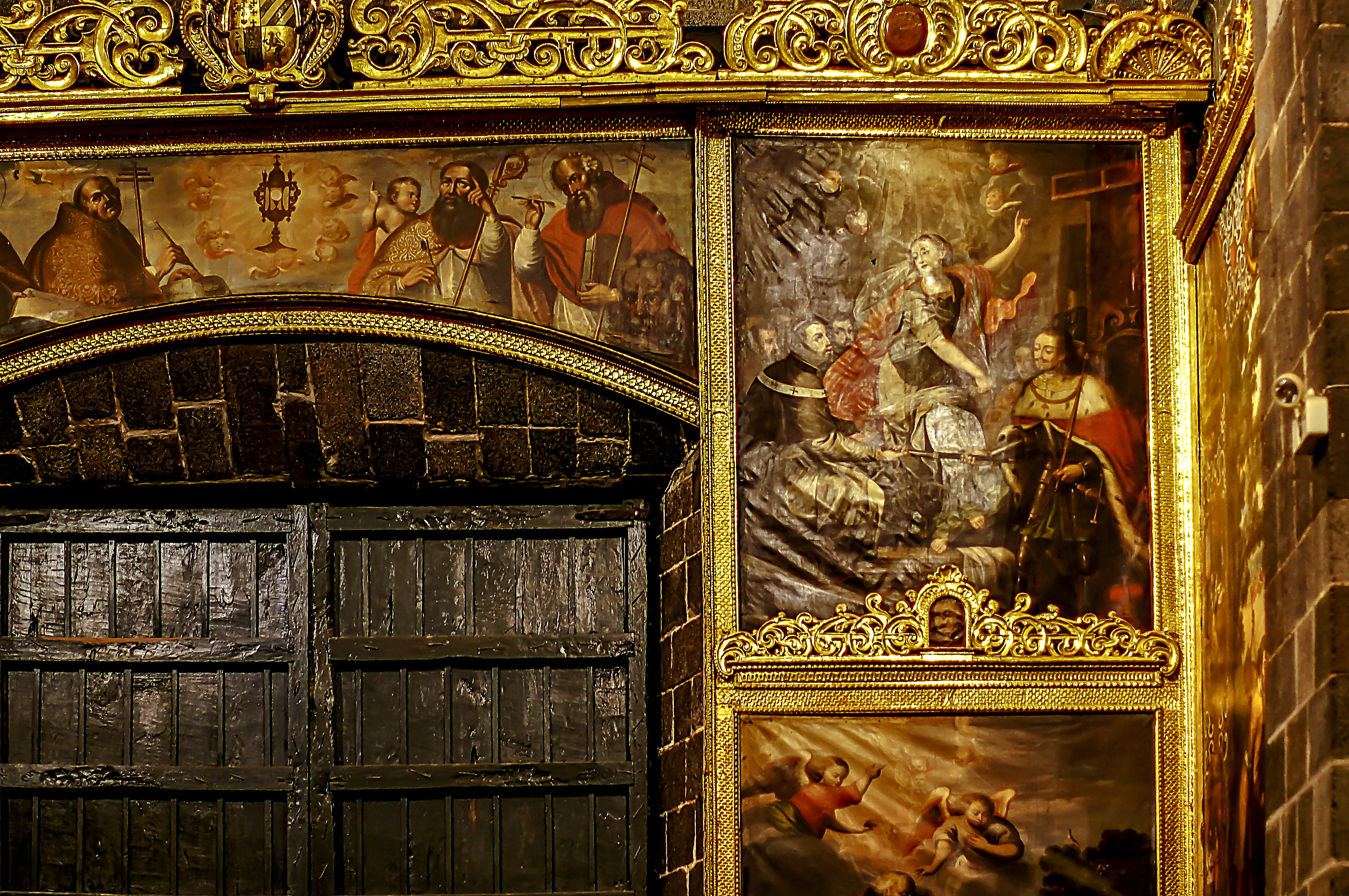
Colonial paintings in the interior

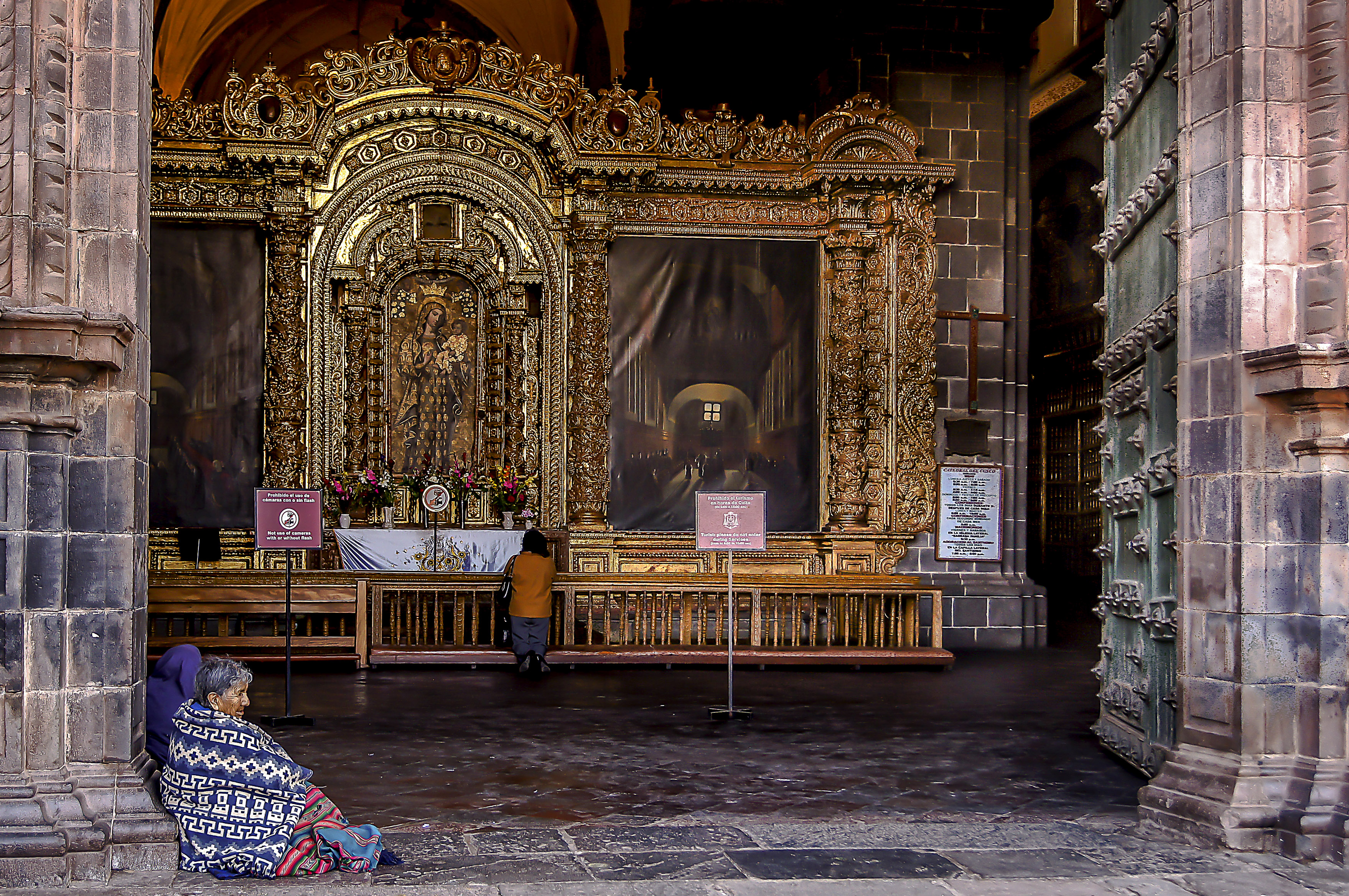
Interior of the cathedral and the late-Gothic image of the virgin

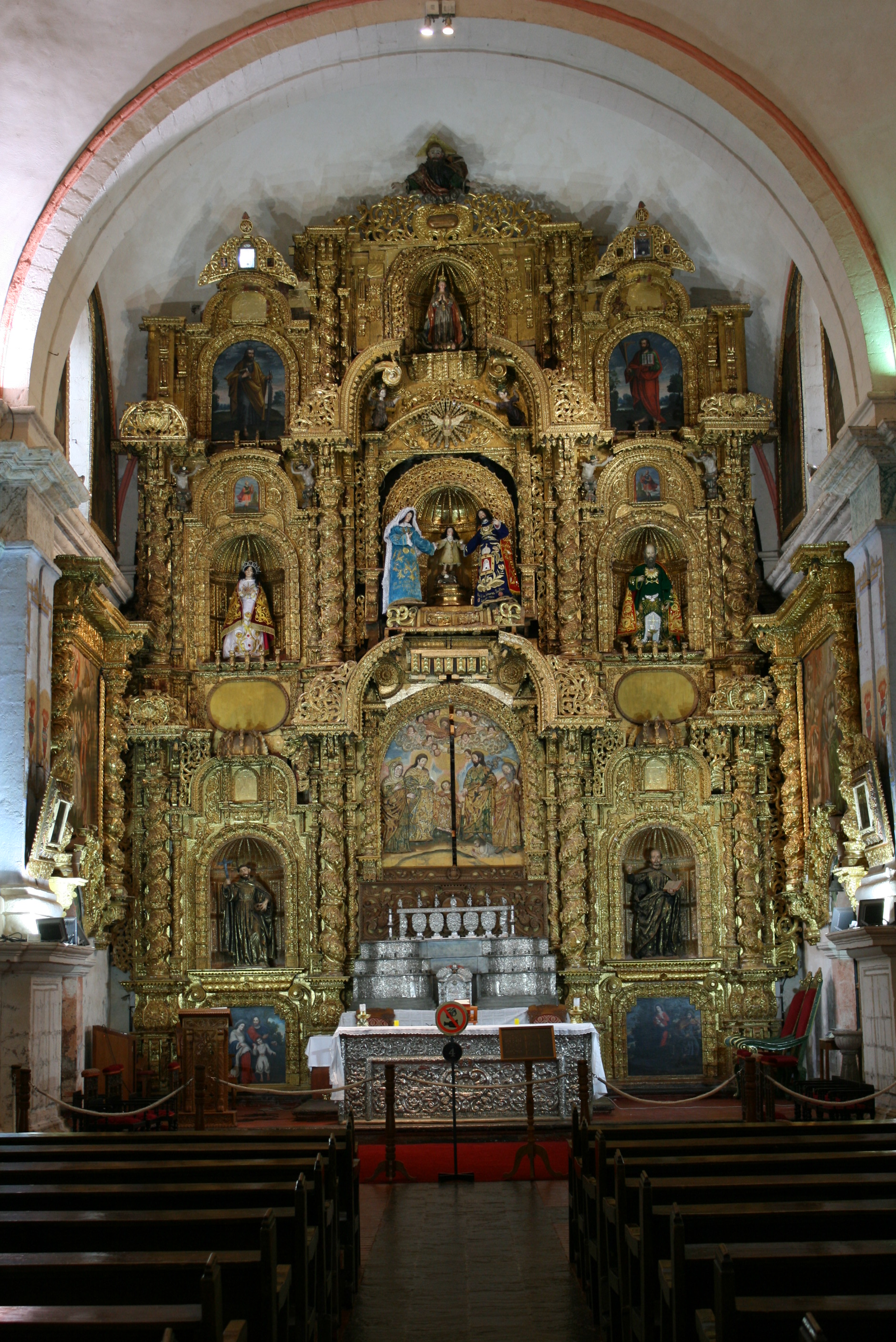
Altarpiece

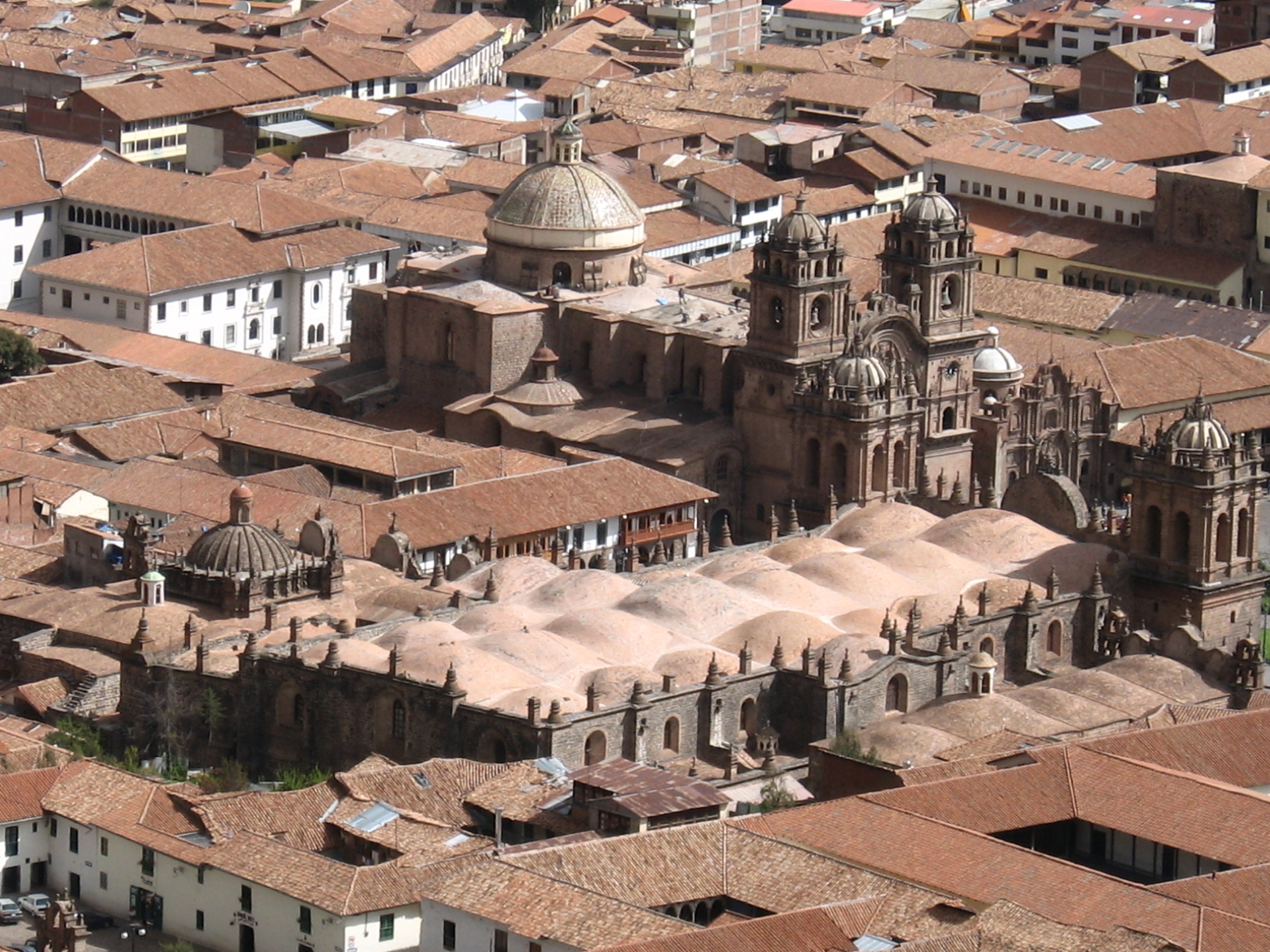
Church of la Compañía de Jesús and the cathedral roof

... Well, this reaches me highly, existing, among the regions recently discovered under the auspices of the ever augustus emperor of the Romans, our very beloved son Charles, who is at the same time king of Castile, León and Aragon, existing a region called Peru whose inhabitants are knowledgeable about the divine law, and in which region many Christian Indians live; and wishing the same Emperor and King Charles with religious affection, that in the aforementioned region of Peru, subject to his mandate, the cult of that most glorious name (Christ) of whom is the entire universe, and all its plenitude and everything in it exists; may its inhabitants be led to the light of truth and spread the salvation of souls; and also wishing that the city of Cusco located in the same region where there is already a Church under the title of Santa María, be elevated to the rank of City and Diocese and the former Church of Santa María to Cathedral Church. Given in Rome next to St. Peter year etc. February 13, one thousand five hundred thirty-six.

— Bull of the erection of the Cathedral Church and the Diocese of Cusco.

The Cathedral of Cusco is the result of various projects carried out by different architects who took over at the head of the works. The first cathedral in Cusco is the Iglesia del Triunfo, built in 1539 on the basis of the palace of Viracocha Inca. At present, this church is an auxiliary chapel of the Cathedral.

The cathedral of Cusco, like that of Lima, is a temple with three naves with two more chapels and a flat front wall. (...) The three naves are of equal height, as in the cathedrals of Lima and Jaén. This last one was the immediate precedent of the two Peruvian cathedrals.

— Extracted from El Arte Hispanoamericano (1988).

In 1538, after the return of Vicente Valverde with the cédulas reales that recognized him as bishop of Cusco, he began the construction of a cathedral by order of erection on September 4, 1538. However, this work would remain in its infancy, as can be deduced from the response of the Cabildo of Cusco to the request of the Cathedral dean Luis de Morales, which indicated that the work would be suspended until the following summer. In the following years, given the narrowness of the assigned site, an attempt was made to move the cathedral first to the part that formerly corresponded to the Palace of Pachacuti called Qasana and that Francisco Pizarro reserved for him (current Portal de Panes of the Plaza de Armas). However, that move was impossible because, in 1538, Pizarro had given that lot to the Franciscans. It was then sought to use the part of the old Cusipata where the Hotel de Turistas del Cusco currently stands, but this idea was also discarded around the 1540s due to the opposition of the Mercedarians who had already occupied the site that they still occupy today and who it would be very close to the cathedral.

Faced with this situation, at the initiative of the second Bishop of Cusco Juan Solano, the Cabildo decided to purchase the Alonso de Mesa lot adjacent to the one assigned for the construction of the cathedral and which corresponded to the old Kiswarcancha that was the Viracocha palace. This decision was made on May 17, 1552.

Between the years 1560 and 1664 the Cathedral Basilica of this city was built. Its construction was entrusted to Juan Miguel de Veramendi in 1560, who was replaced one year later by Juan Correa who worked until 1564. This was followed by Juan Rodríguez de Rivera, Juan Cárdenas, Juan Toledano and Bartolomé Carrión. However, when Viceroy Francisco de Toledo arrived in Cusco between 1570 and 1572, the construction of the cathedral was stopped. In 1615, Miguel Gutiérrez Sencio, an architect who followed Vitruvius and Giacomo Barozzi, and an admirer of the sober and pure style (Herrerian style) established by Juan de Herrera in El Escorial Monastery, took over the direction of the work, along with Francisco Becerra. Under their direction, the Cathedral of Cuzco was completed in 1654.

The 1650 earthquake caused little damage to the cathedral except for the collapse of the ribbed vault. This earthquake motivated the change of the planes of the façade in its upper part and the suppression of the third body in the towers, which is why there is too much volume in the body, leaving the towers short, giving the appearance of solidity to the building.

The premiere mass of the cathedral was on August 15, 1654 and its definitive consecration was on August 19, 1668 by the thirteenth bishop of Cusco Bernardo de Isaguirre Reyes.

The construction material was stone from nearby areas and red granite blocks were also reused from the fortress known as Sacsayhuamán.

It was recognized as a Basilica of the Catholic Church on February 8, 1928. The construction, with three naves, stands on a hall-type floor plan. A surprising detail is the fusion between the order of the capitals and friezes and the type of roof used: the ribbed vault, characteristic of the Gothic. This gives rise to a surprising amalgamation of styles, frequent in the Baroque style of Latin America. The famous image of the Lord of the Earthquakes is venerated in the cathedral.

This cathedral possesses a Renaissance façade and Baroque, late-Gothic and Plateresque interiors. It also features colonial gold work and carved wooden altars.

Since in this city the painting on canvas of the famous Cusco School of painting was developed, the most important in Colonial America, important samples of local artists who follow this school can be seen precisely in the cathedral.

== Architecture ==
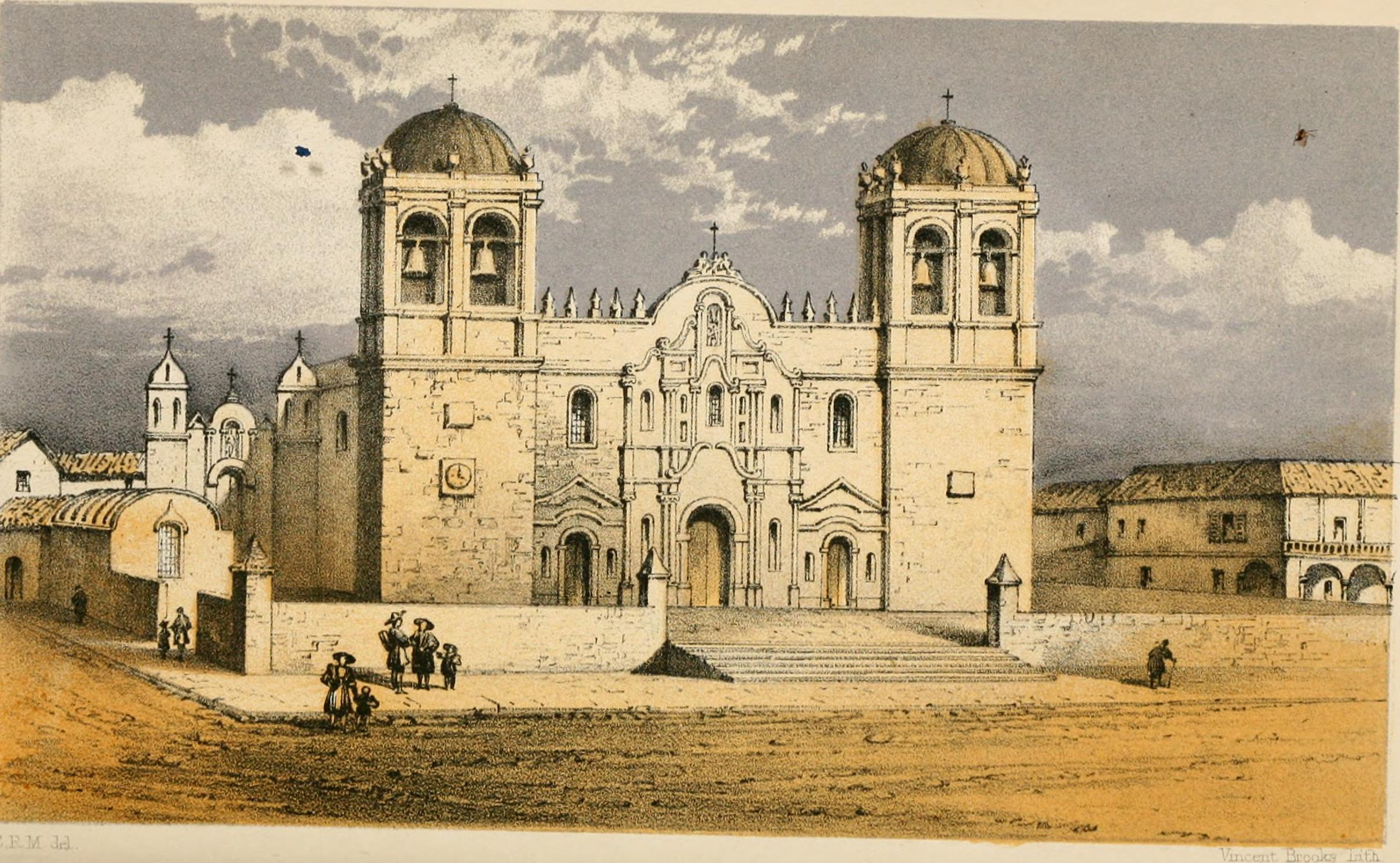
The Cusco Cathedral in 1856

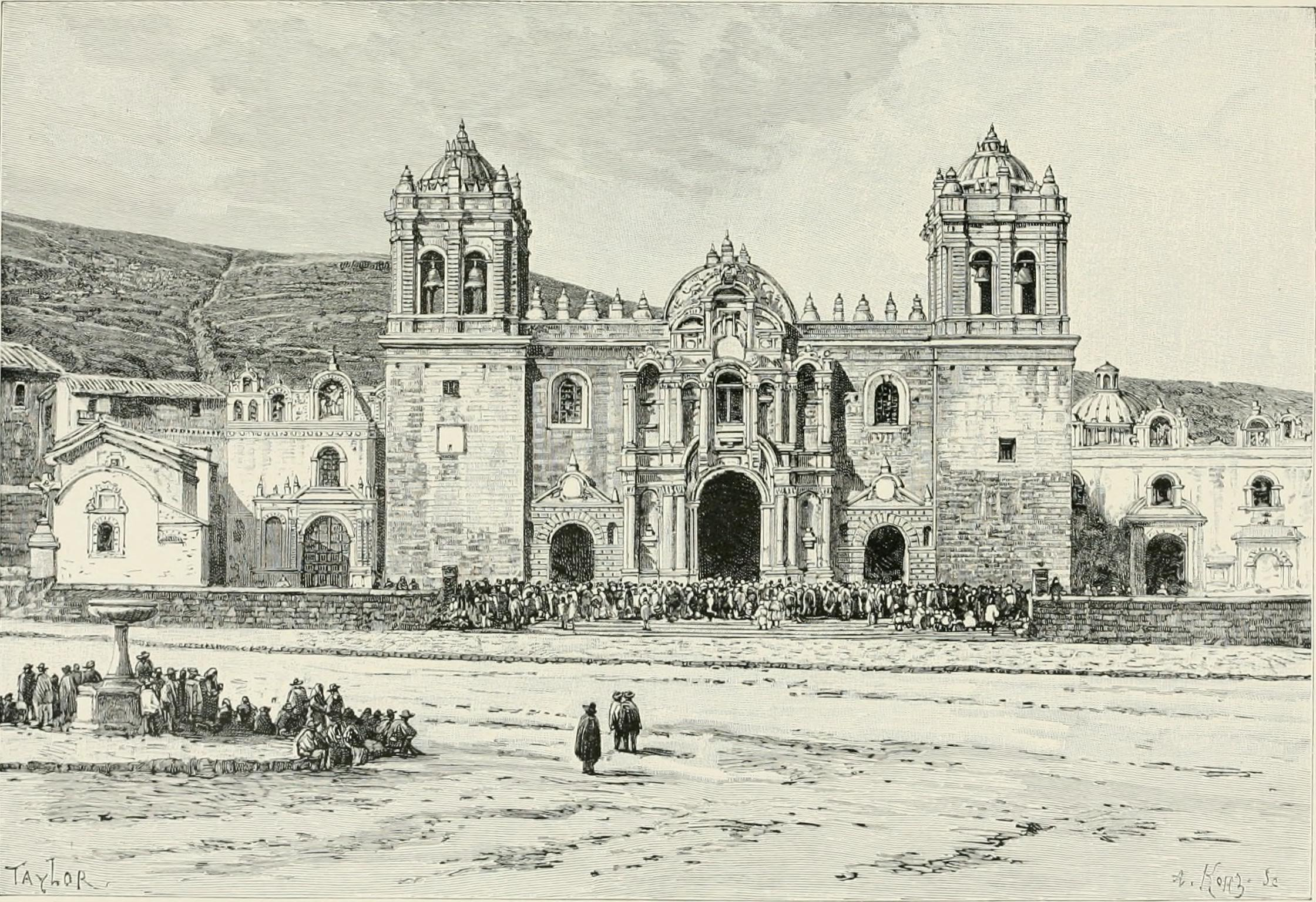
Cathedral of Cusco in 1894 by Élisée Reclus.

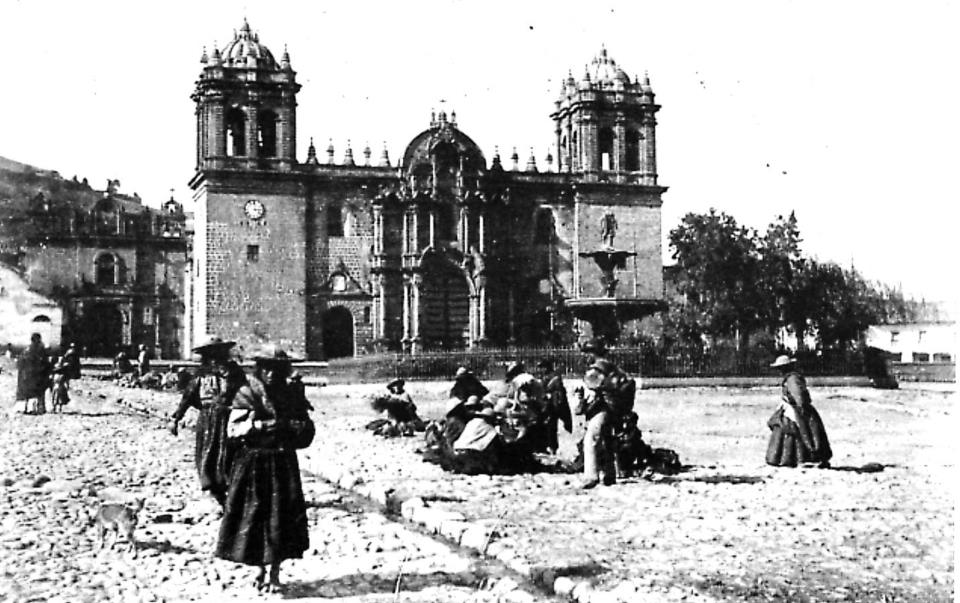
Cathedral of Cusco in 1900.

The Gothic-Renaissance style of the cathedral reflects that of Spain during the period of the Spanish conquest of South America and also Cusco. There is also evidence of Baroque influence in the façade on the Plaza de Armas.

The Cathedral of Cusco has a rectangular basilica-type floor plan with three naves: the epistle nave, the gospel nave and the central nave, coinciding with the three doors on the façade. It has fourteen cruciform pillars that define the distribution of the twenty-four rib vaults, the largest being the entrance vault and the crossing. The 24 vaults are supported by basic structures made up of 21 stone arches and 32 semicircular arches. All these structures are made of andesite stone (a fine-grained volcanic rock chemically and mineralogically similar to diorite)

The naves are covered with Gothic ribbed vaults, made from tiercerons joined together by spine and cross ribs and by ribs that draw circles and ogees. The chapels are covered with groin vaults.

The Incas incorporated some of their religious symbolism into the cathedral, for example, the carved head of a jaguar (an important god or religious motif found widely through much of ancient Peru) is part of the cathedral doors.

=== Artwork ===
Much of the artwork in the cathedral originated from the Escuela Cuzquena (Cusco School of art). This was a school that was built by the Spanish to educate the Incas and their descendants with the methods and disciplines of European renaissance style artwork. This school was famous throughout the colonial Americas, but the Quechua painters were limited to painting scenes of European and Catholic importance. The restrictions imposed on the Inca artists meant that they were not permitted to sign their own artwork, so much of it is unidentifiable. Also participated white criollo painters. Here is a list of some of the most notable pieces found within the cathedral:

- Pintura Señor de los Temblores. 17th century large painting, which depicts the whole of Cusco during the 1650 earthquake. Many of the townspeople can be seen carrying a crucifix (see the 'Cathedral Artifacts' section) around the Plaza de Armas, praying for the tremor to end.
- Vicente de Valverde. A portrait of the friar who became a bishop at Cusco, after accompanying Francisco Pizarro on his conquests.
- Christ's 12 Parables. An incomplete collection of twelve paintings by the Quechuan artist Diego Quispe Tito. There were initially twelve canvases (completed in 1681) to depict the twelve months and zodiac symbols of the year, incorporating the parables of Jesus into the pictures.

== Iglesia del Triunfo ==
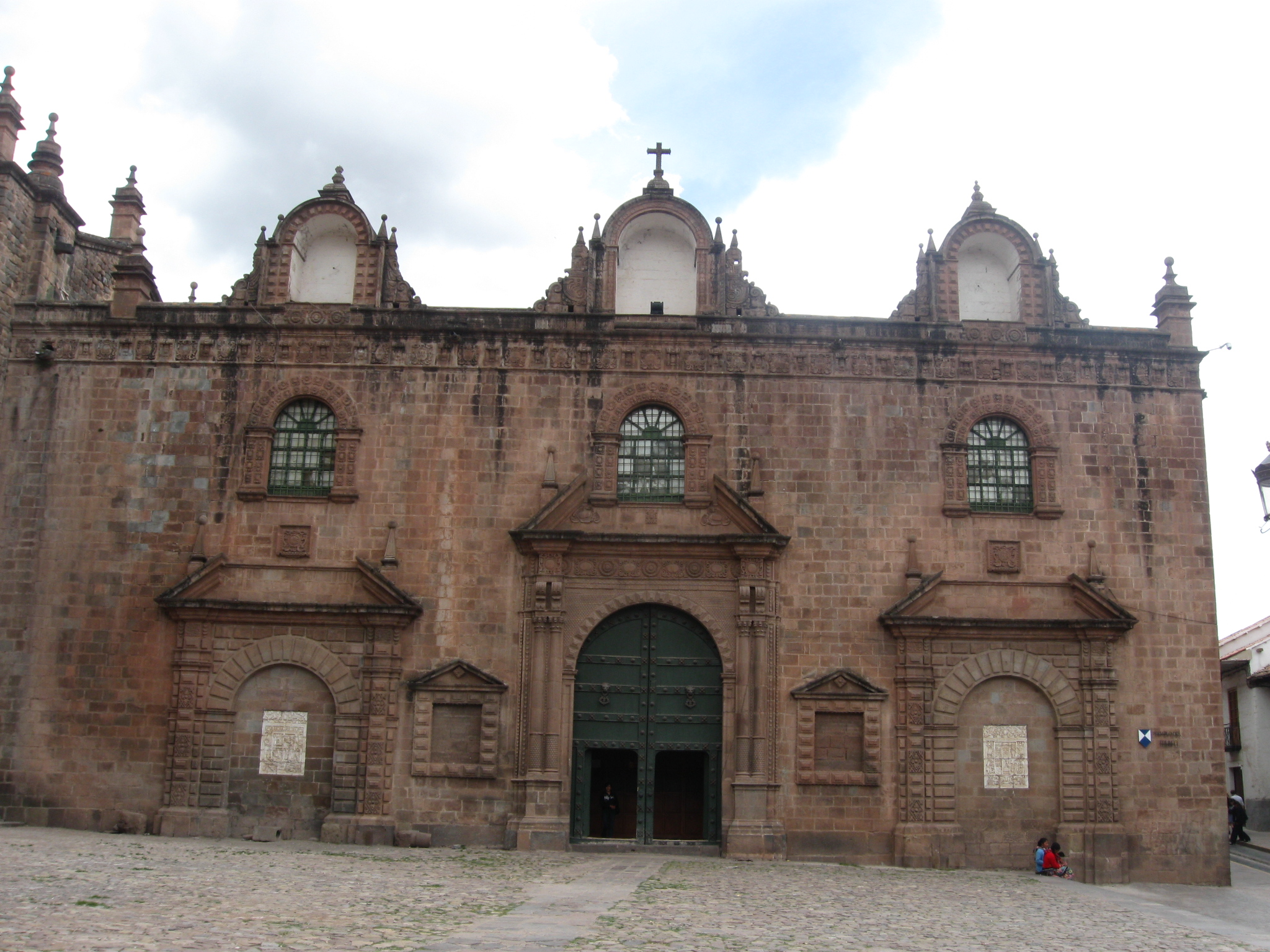
Façade of the Iglesia del Triunfo (Church of the Triumph)

The Iglesia del Triunfo or, in English, Church of the Triumph, was built in 1538, just three years after the conquistadores settled in Cusco. It was built over Suntur Wasi, which was an Inca ceremonial building adjoining the palace of Viracocha, in a similar way to the way that the cathedral is now adjoined to the earlier Iglesia del Triunfo.

The name of the Church of Triumph derives from the history of the Spanish settlers in Cusco. At one point, presumably between 1533, and 1536, the Spanish were cornered by a besieging army of Incas, led by Manko Inka. The final stand for the Spanish was in the Suntur Wasi, before its demolition, and just as it seemed that they were on the verge of defeat, the Spanish miraculously managed to drive back the Incas. The Catholic conquistadores attributed this victory to Saint James the Greater (the patron saint of Spain), who was reported at the time to descend from heaven to drive back the Incas. This is why the church is called the Church of Triumph, and also why there is a statue of St. James atop a horse within the Church, depicting him slaying an Inca.

== See also ==
- Señor de los Temblores
