= Iglesia de la Compañía de Jesús, Cusco =

Coordinates: 13°31′2.64″S 71°58′41.5626″W

Iglesia de la Compañía de Jesús
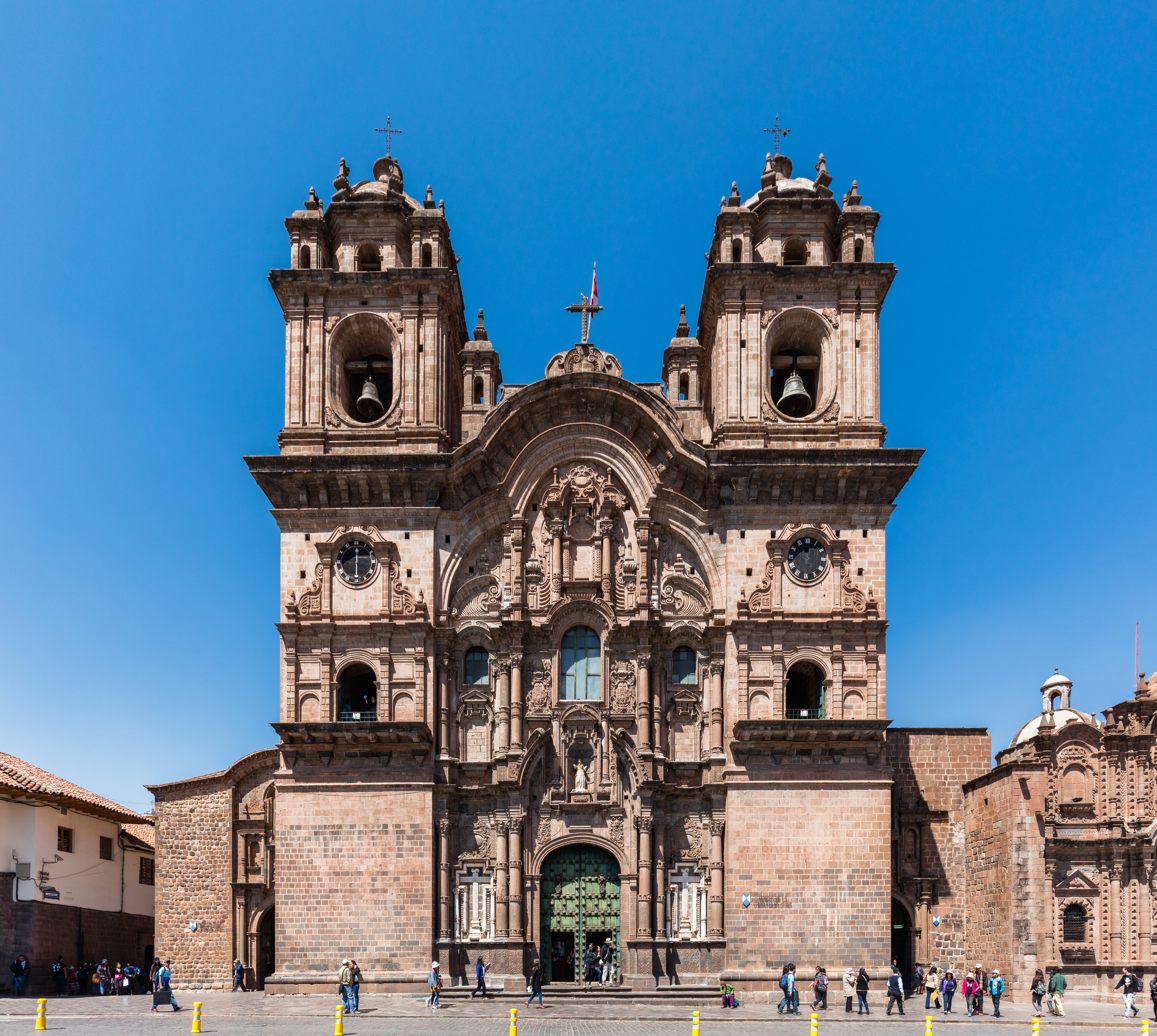
- Main façade
- Iglesia de la Compañía de Jesús
- Location: Cusco
- Country: Peru
- Denomination: Roman Catholic

History
- Founded: 1571

Architecture
- Architect(s): Jean-Baptiste Gilles, Diego Martínez de Oviedo
- Style: Baroque
- Groundbreaking: 1651
- Completed: 1673

UNESCO World Heritage Site
- Part of: City of Cuzco
- Criteria: Cultural: iii, iv
- Reference: 273
- Inscription: 1983 (7th Session)
- Area: Latin America and the Caribbean

Cultural Heritage of Peru
- Official name: Iglesia de la Compañía
- Type: Immovable tangible
- Criteria: Monument
- Designated: 28 December 1972; 53 years ago
- Legal basis: R.S. Nº 2900-72-ED

The Iglesia de la Compañía de Jesús (Church of the Society of Jesus) is a historic Jesuit church in Cusco, the ancient capital of the Inca Empire, in Cusco Region, Peru. It is situated in the Plaza de Armas de Cusco, the city center. It is built on an Inca palace. It is one of the best examples of Spanish Baroque architecture in Peru. The architecture of this building exerted a great influence on the development of many Baroque architecture in the South Andes. Its construction began in 1576, but it was badly damaged in an earthquake in 1650. The rebuilt church was completed in 1673.

== History ==
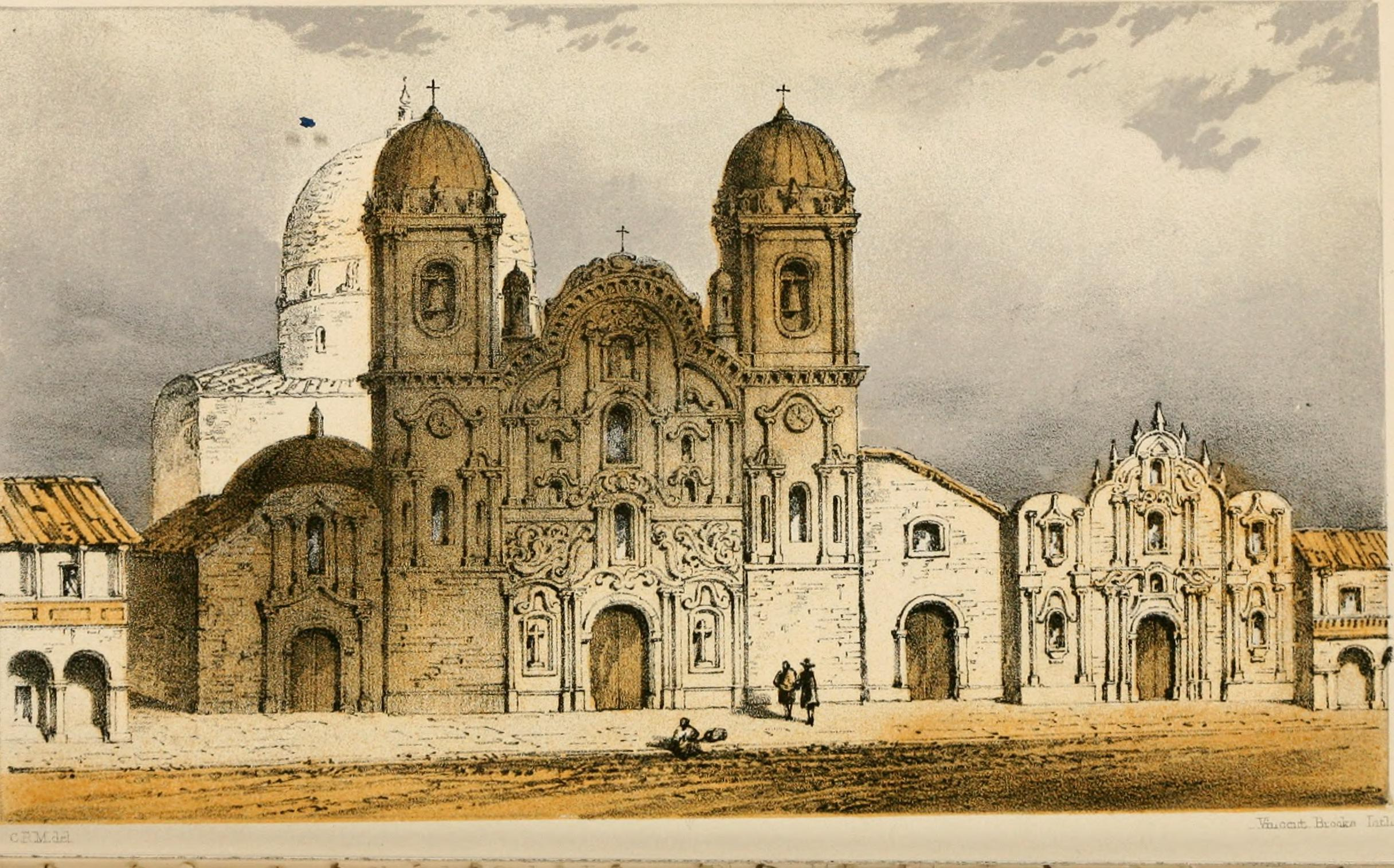
Iglesia de la Compañía de Jesús in 1856 by Robert Clements and Clements Markham

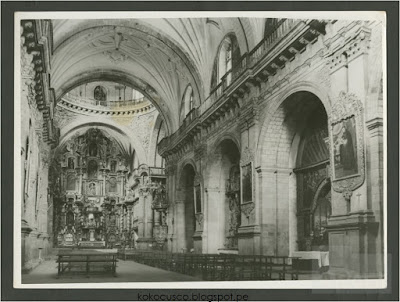
Church of La Compañía in 1906.

The Jesuits arrived in Peru on March 29, 1568, landing at the port of El Callao and entered Lima on April 1. The road to Cusco was made by the Provincial Father Jerónimo Ruíz de Portilla accompanied by Luis López, Antonio Gonzáles Ocampo and three more priests who left Lima together with Viceroy Francisco de Toledo. They arrived at the imperial city on January 12, 1571, before the viceroy who delayed attending to government issues of the country. Once in Cusco, Viceroy Toledo authorized the Jesuits to occupy Amarucancha, which then belonged to the heirs of Hernando Pizarro. The Jesuits building of a church on this site offered strategic and symbolic value as it was formally the palace of the Inca ruler Huayna Capac. Located directly on Cusco's main square the plot offered immediate visibility and proximity to both the cathedral and municipal authorities. Jesuit leaders argued that Amarucancha was spacious, suitable for public preaching and rich in reusable building materials. Its deeper importance lay in its connection to Inca royal lineage and its placement at the historic center of the Andean world. By constructing their church on this site the Jesuits aligned themselves with a location of long standing political and religious significance, strengthening their presence in everyday urban life.

The Jesuits also chose Amarucancha site because it connected their new church to Cusco's long architectural tradition of building important religious structures over older Inca foundations. Studies of Cusco's colonial churches show that Spaniards often reused Inca walls and palace sites when establishing major churches. This pattern appears throughout the historic center where many churches sit directly on former Inca complexes. These Churches acted as material symbols of Christianization and reflected the boarder colonial practice of reshaping indigenous religious sacred spaces. Amarucancha fits this model perfectly; it was centrally located and already contained strong stone foundations while also standing across from other major church's on the Plaza de Armas. Building on this spot gave the Jesuits a highly visible position and tied their influence in both spiritual and social world of the colonial city.

The price of the property of Amarucancha amounted to 12,000 pesos and was paid based on donations made by Teresa Orgóñez, daughter of Rodrigo Orgóñez - lieutenant of Diego de Almagro - and her husband Diego de Silva y Guzmán. On July 17, 1571, the Colegio de la Transfiguración del Señor and the Church of la Compañía de Jesús, were founded, beginning that same year the construction of the first building that served as a church. Likewise, near Intik'ijllu street, they built the Chapel of Nuestra Señora de Loreto destined for the Indians. This first church had a Plateresque-style façade and the main altarpiece was begun by Bernardo Bitti. The church was considered one of the beautiful and imposing in Peru and became the largest that Society of Jesus had in the viceroyalty. Around 1631, in addition to the church, portals were built on the square under the rectorship of the priest Luis Ferrer de Ayala. This church suffered extensive damage in the 1650 earthquake and had to be completely demolished.

The new project contemplated a larger church than the one demolished with two lateral chapels, three doors on the square and a bell of 100 quintals. Construction began on August 22, 1651, and the vault of the nave was completed in 1653 on the same August 22. The order requested permission from the Viceroy García Sarmiento de Sotomayor for the use of the Pucyura quarry, which was granted on September 16, 1653. The construction of the new church faced opposition because the plans were considered daring and would diminish dignity and importance to the Cathedral with which it kept very little distance. The written opposition was formulated by the bachelor Diego Arias de la Cerda on October 22, 1656, before the viceroy, who issued a ruling favorable to the Jesuits. This decision was appealed by the Bishop of Cusco Pedro de Ortega y Sotomayor before the Real Audiencia while the construction of the church continued. The construction lasted 17 years and included the 100 quintal bell, which, however, was withdrawn in 1694 when it cracked. The church was designed by the Flemish Jesuit and architect, Jean-Baptiste Gilles (Hispanized name was Juan Bautista Edigiano), the works on the façade were directed by Diego Martínez de Oviedo, Oviedo is very likely to follow the plan provided by Gilles.

According to Angles Vargas, in Noticias Cronológicas de la Gran Ciudad del Cuzco by Diego de Esquivel y Navia, there is the following news about the culmination of the church:

"Tuesday, July 24, 1668. The solemn transfer of images and relics and collation of the new church of la Compañía de Jesús, whose title is the Transfiguration of the Lord, was celebrated with the feast of the glorious Saint Ignatius of Loyola, Tuesday, July 31 of 1668, in which the venerable dean and Cabildo made the offices, and Dr. Don Eugenio Gómez de la Vaquera, canon of this church, said the panegyric prayer, with the assistance of the Cabildo, clergy and religions, being rector of said school Father Juan of Urquiza".

The church remained under the power of the Jesuit Order until the expulsion ordered by King Charles III of Spain. The Jesuits left Cusco on September 14, 1767. There were 41 religious who traveled to Moquegua and Ilo and to be transferred to Lima and then to Europe. After that, the church became the parish church of El Sagrario (the Sanctuary) until the return of the Jesuits.

== Description ==
=== Façade ===
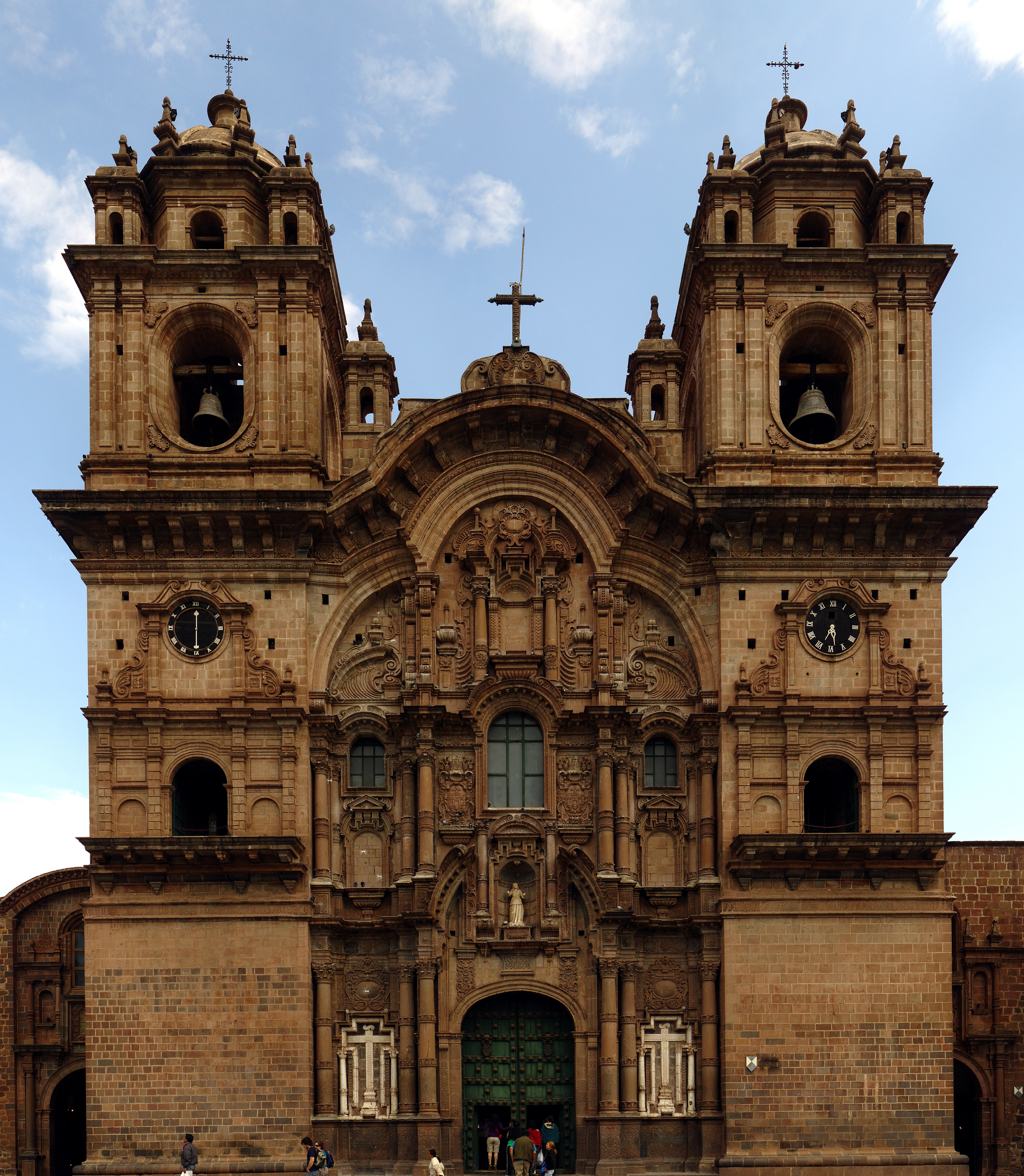
Detail of the church façade

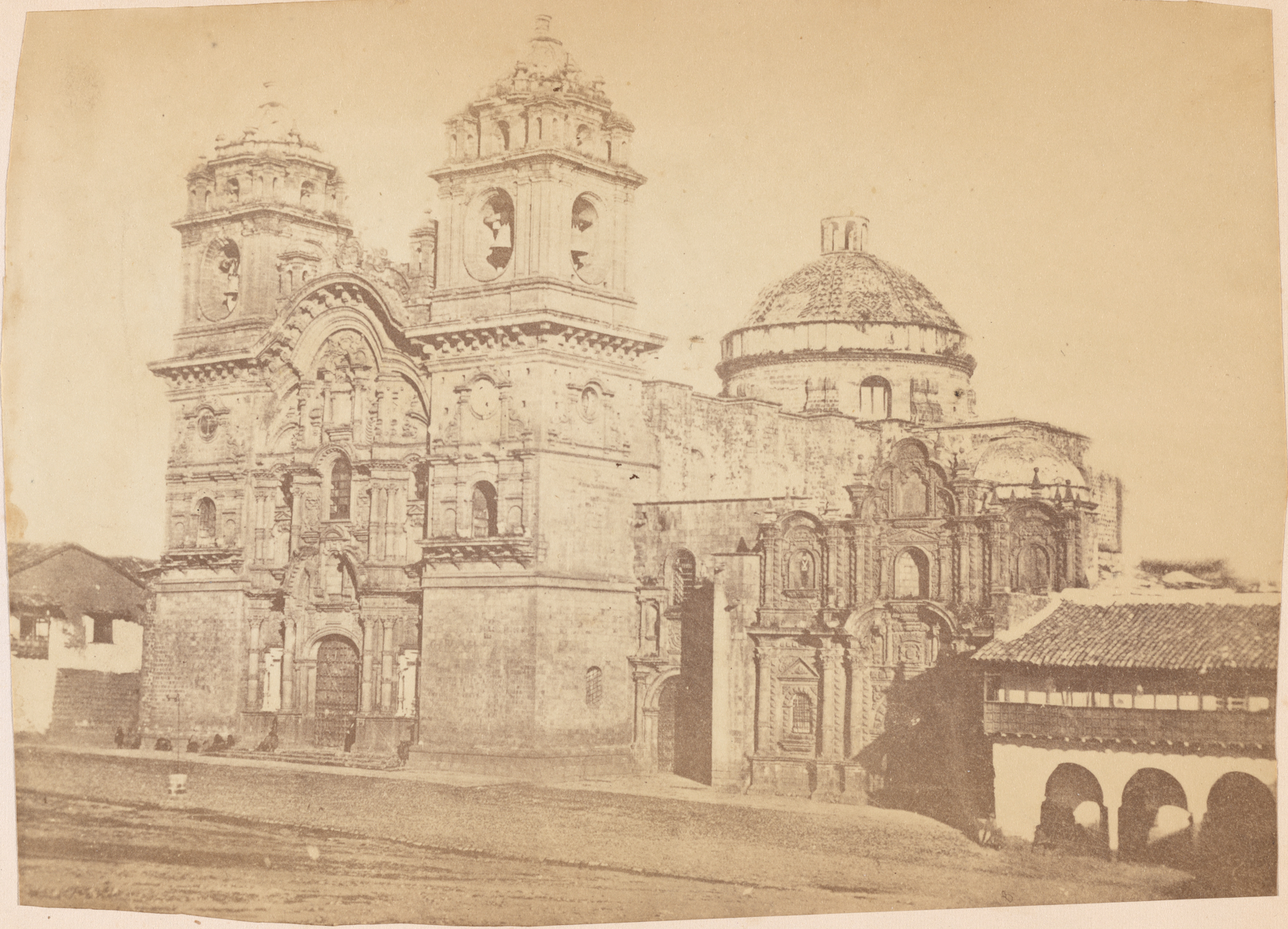
Church of la Compañía de Jesús in 1868. New York Public Library

The church is entirely made of stone, the material is pink basalt and andesite. It has a single nave and two side chapels. The main façade is a classic example of the Baroque style and consists of two identical lateral cubes that project towards the bell towers with a central façade limited by both. The bases of the cubes have a rectangular floor plan without decorations and end up in a cornice. The middle third has a central window on the lower cornice that gives it the shape of a balcony without a railing. On each side there are two false pilasters with their corresponding entablature. The bay occupies the central intercolumnium and a small niche opens in each of the side intercolumns. On top of the false entablature run two other false pilasters that in their upper third enclose the space for the clock. This body ends in a cornice supported by stone beams. The last third corresponds to the bell tower that has:

- Four openings with sill edges and quasi-elliptical shape.
- Four columns that constitute the framework of the bell tower.
- Several false pilasters that decorate the previous columns.
- A cornice that surrounds on all four sides.
- The dome of the bell tower with its capital. On the cornice, in each corner there is a lithic urn and another central lithic urn. On the horizontal line of the base of the mentioned urns, several small domes run.

The lower part of the facade has a large door with a wide opening that culminates in a segmental arch. Three Corinthian columns on each side of the door, two of them together and close to the door jamb and another separate. The columns have a common pedestal with plinth, cornice and base plus the upper false entablature, with architrave, frieze and cornice. In addition, each column has rings in the upper and lower limits of the middle third of the shaft. In the space that corresponds to each intercolumnium there is a Latin cross made of white brindle which makes it stand out from the rest. A rectangular surface extends over the door with two side ornaments plus a central one as a shelf. On the shelf there is a pedestal with a niche that culminates in a semi-vault. Inside the niche there is a statue of the Virgin Mary in brindle. On each side of this niche is a Corinthian column. From the internal ends of the cornices, the lateral entablatures follow a semicircular arch cut in its central and upper portion.

The middle part of the façade has a central window above the statue of the Virgin that culminates in a semicircular arch. On both sides are ornaments in high relief on two pedestals. On each side there are two Corinthian columns together, with pedestal and false entablature, the shafts with rings. Moving to each side, windows open and below each one, a simulated window. Outside the window, there is a last column almost next to the tower.

The final part of the façade forms a trilobe. The sides are identical and opposite in the arrangement of the elements. The central one is a semicircular arch. On each lateral lobe is a large fluted shell and ornaments. Inside the central one runs an altarpiece made up of two Corinthian columns with a complicated false entablature that culminates in a central medallion supported by two curved projections. in the intercolumnium there is a niche with a lower shelf.

=== Interior ===
Upon entering the church, we find the large central nave covered with Gothic ribbed vaults that unload their efforts on thick stone walls, following the design pattern of the Church of the Gesù in Rome, with its Latin cross plan.

In the transept, the overhead lighting coming from the lantern of the semicircular dome highlights the great decorative treatment in stone that the pendentives of both the dome and the pilasters possess, allowing us to see the great skill that the indigenous stonemasons possessed in the stereotomy of the stone.

Finally we arrive at the presbytery where the main altar stands out, made up of an altarpiece 21 meters high and 12 meters wide, carved in cedar and gilded entirely with gold leaves. It has Solomonic columns, a large number of paintings, a central canvas representing the Transfiguration of Jesus, a sculpture of the Virgin of the Immaculate Conception, and various ornaments and decorations made with precious stones that highlight the Baroque style of the complex.

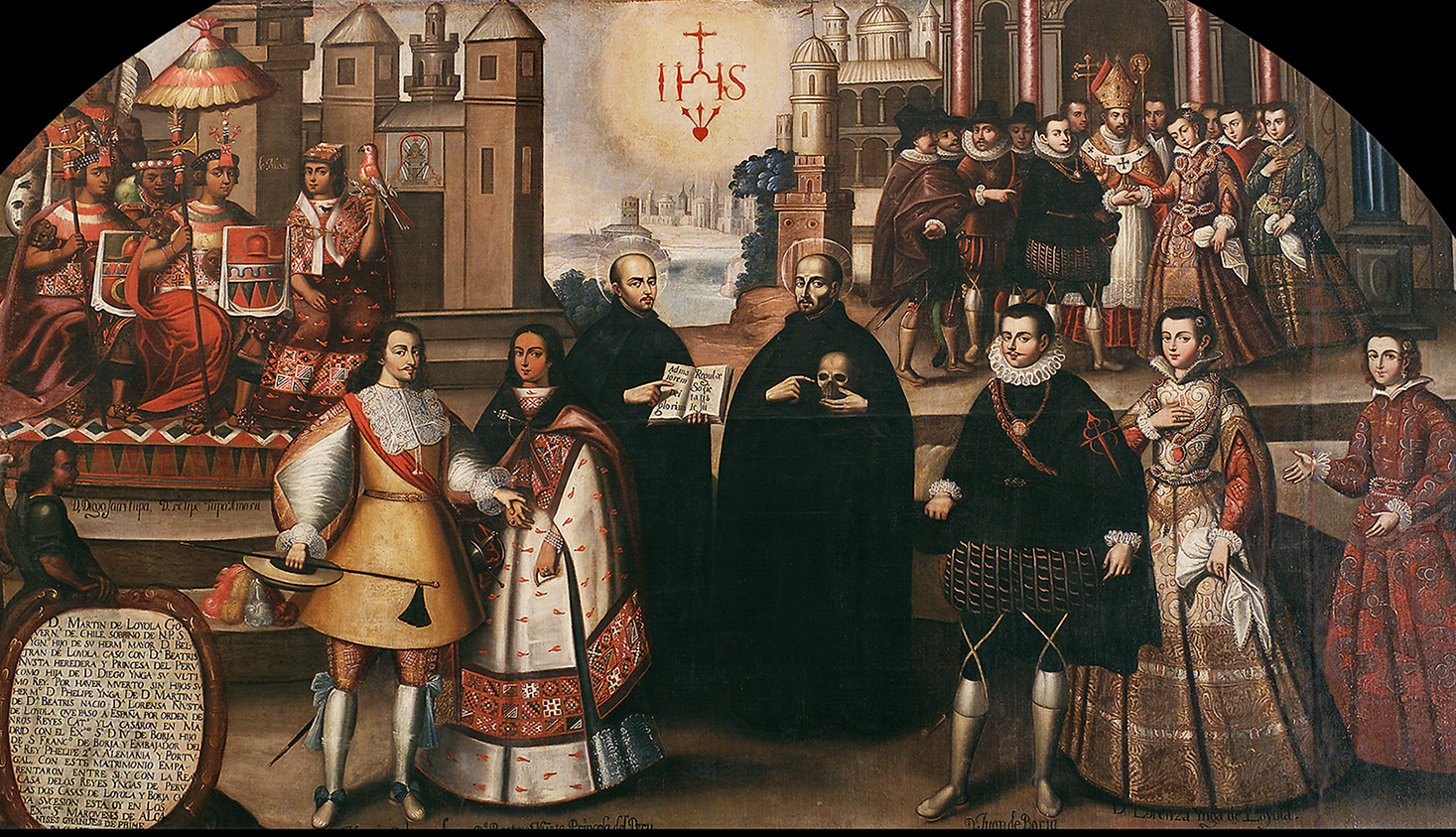
Large painting The Wedding of Captain Martín García Oñas de Loyola with Doña Ñusta Beatriz Clara Qoya, daughter of Sayri Túpac, 17th-century painting (Cusco School). It is located inside.

Similar sumptuousness is seen in the carved tribunes and the rest of the altarpieces, some of which belonged to the defunct Templo de San Agustín. The collection of sculptures and paintings within are noteworthy. The church exhibits, under the choir of the main altar, works of art by Marcos Zapata and his assistant Cipriano Gutiérrez. On both sides of the main gate of the main altar, around the alabaster windows (huamanga), there are two canvases that represent the life of St. Ignatius of Loyola: in one he is healing the sick and in the other he is victorious over the heretics and schismatics of the Reformation.

The interior also hosts two paintings of great historical value. The first, located on the northern wall, is The Wedding of Martín García Oñas de Loyola with Doña Ñusta Beatriz Clara Qoya, which depicts the union of this Spanish captain, nephew of St. Ignatius of Loyola (who is founder of the Society of Jesus) and apprehender of the last Incas of Túpac Amaru, and the ñusta of Inca lineage, daughter of Sayri Túpac and therefore niece of Túpac Amaru. This noble indigenous woman, Beatriz Clara, was heiress of the Lordship of Yucay. Their mestiza daughter, ñusta Lorenza de Loyola Qoya, was the first Marquiss of Santiago de Oropesa, the nobiliary title that granted claim to all the properties of the Yucay Valley and the surrounding Oropesa, with the power to rule them with complete independence of the local authorities. This daughter married Juan de Borja y Enríquez de Luna, son of St. Francis Borgia. Also on the canvas are Túpac Amaru and Sayri Túpac, who, like the princess, wear native clothes; behind them appears the achiwa, a kind of umbrella made of multicolored bird feathers and used only by the Inca. The second painting is on the south wall and represents the wedding of Beltrán García de Loyola with Teresa Idiáquez, daughter of Juan Idiáquez and Magdalena de Loyola.

In the church, there are paintings and sculptures by Diego de la Puente, Marcos Zapata, and Cristo de Burgos. The Jesuit college in Cusco was dedicated the Transfiguration of Christ, and the high altar features a painting of the Transfiguration attributed to the Jesuit Diego de la Puente.

=== Chapel of San Ignacio de Loyola ===
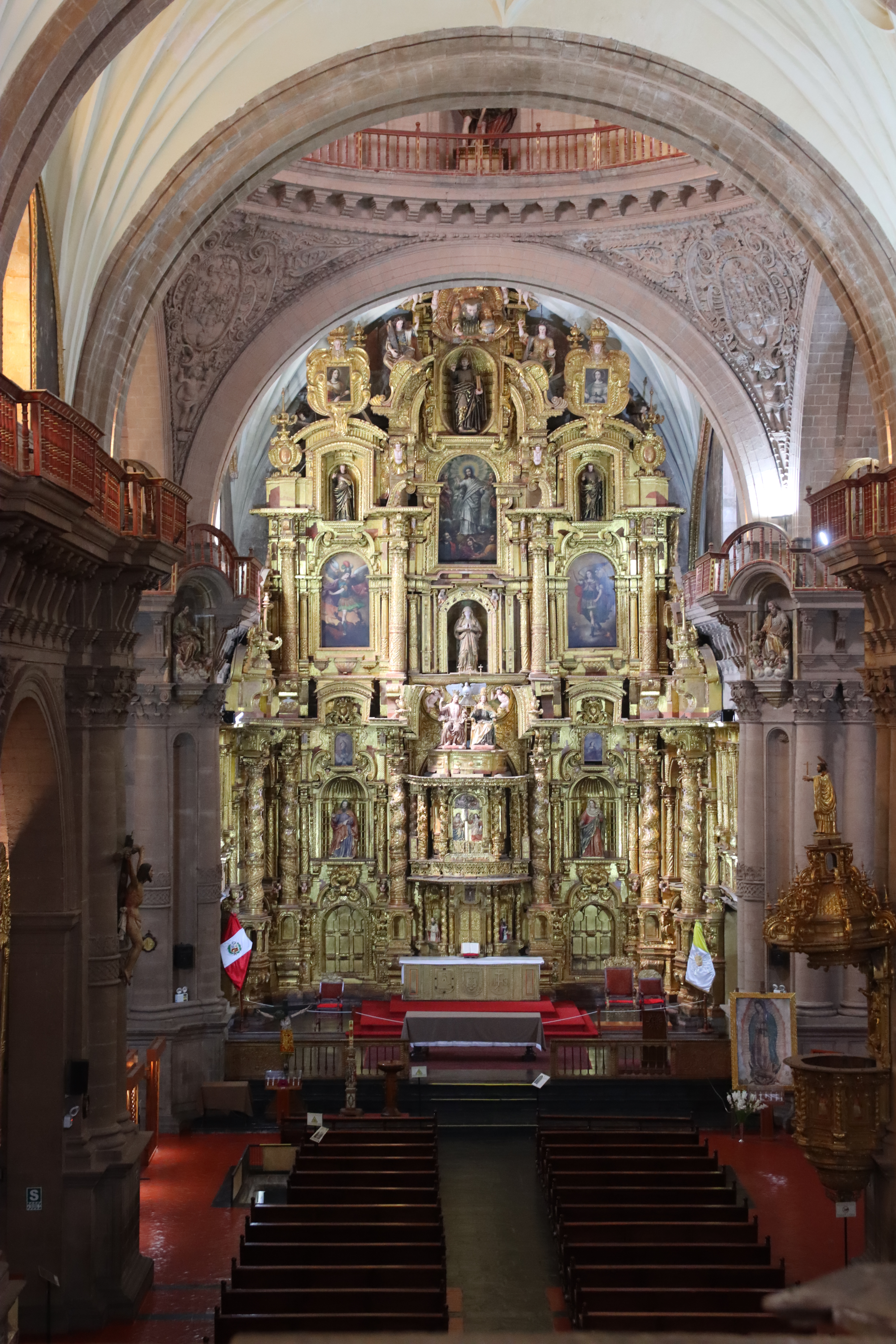
View of the interior

The chapel of San Ignacio de Loyola is located to the south, and adjacent to that is the central location of the modern-day National University of Saint Anthony the Abbot in Cuzco. That building originally served the Universidad San Ignacio de Loyola, which was part of the University of the Transfiguration, created by Pope Gregory XV in 1621. After the Jesuits were expelled in 1767, the site served as the army barracks and prison of José Gabriel Condorcanqui (Túpac Amaru II). At the end of the 19th century, it housed the Society of Artisans. The chapel is small and austere, with a single nave built in stone, and has a more sober portal than that of the main church. It is currently an exhibition hall.

=== University ===
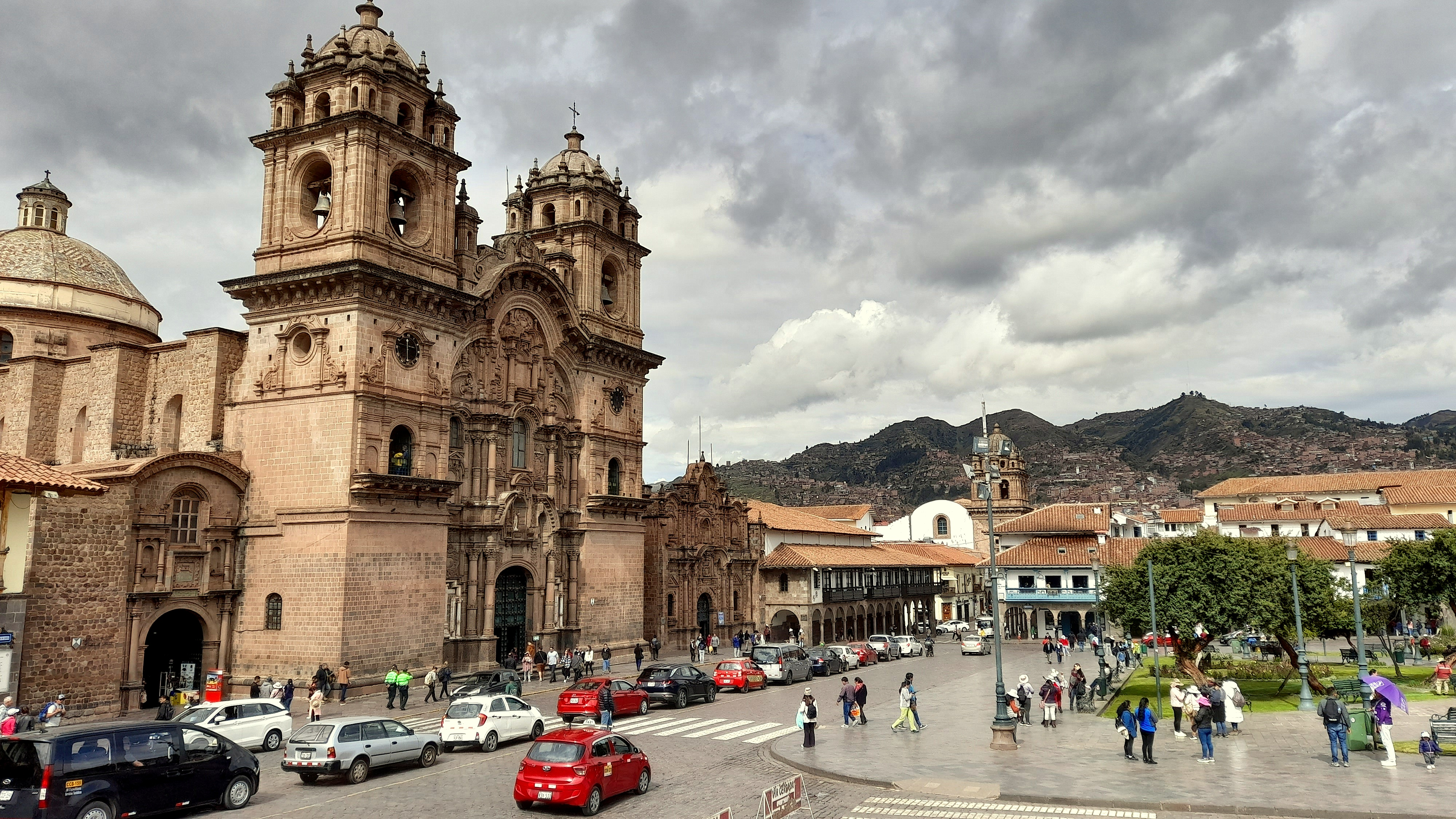
Complete façade

Next to their church, the Jesuits built their own university: the University of San Ignacio de Loyola, now the premises of the National University of Saint Anthony the Abbot. Paradoxically, the two institutions were major rivals at the end of the 17th century. The stone façade dates from that time, but its treatment is much freer than that of the main church.

Its composition, like an altarpiece, is adorned with a profuse padding and with blind, purely decorative windows. Its wide hall, crowned by a dome, is unique in Cusco. The inner cloister, which contains an austere stone arcade, served as a model for others in the city. It houses the Museum of Natural Sciences.

The Seminary of San Antonio de Abad was founded in 1598 in a building on the Calle de las Nazarenas (today the Hotel Monasterio); In 1692, through a document given by Pope Innocent XII, the University of Saint Anthony the Abbot was created on its base.

=== Side chapels ===
The complex includes two chapels located on both sides of the church. The "Chapel of the Indians" or "Chapel of la Virgen de Loreto" built in 1571 and rebuilt after the earthquake of 1650 and the Chapel of San Ignacio on the left side of the church that is currently the headquarters of the Society of Artisans of Cusco.

== See also ==
- List of Jesuit sites
