= Hotel de Turistas del Cusco =

Former hotel building in Cusco, Peru

Coordinates: 13.5177°S 71.9798°W

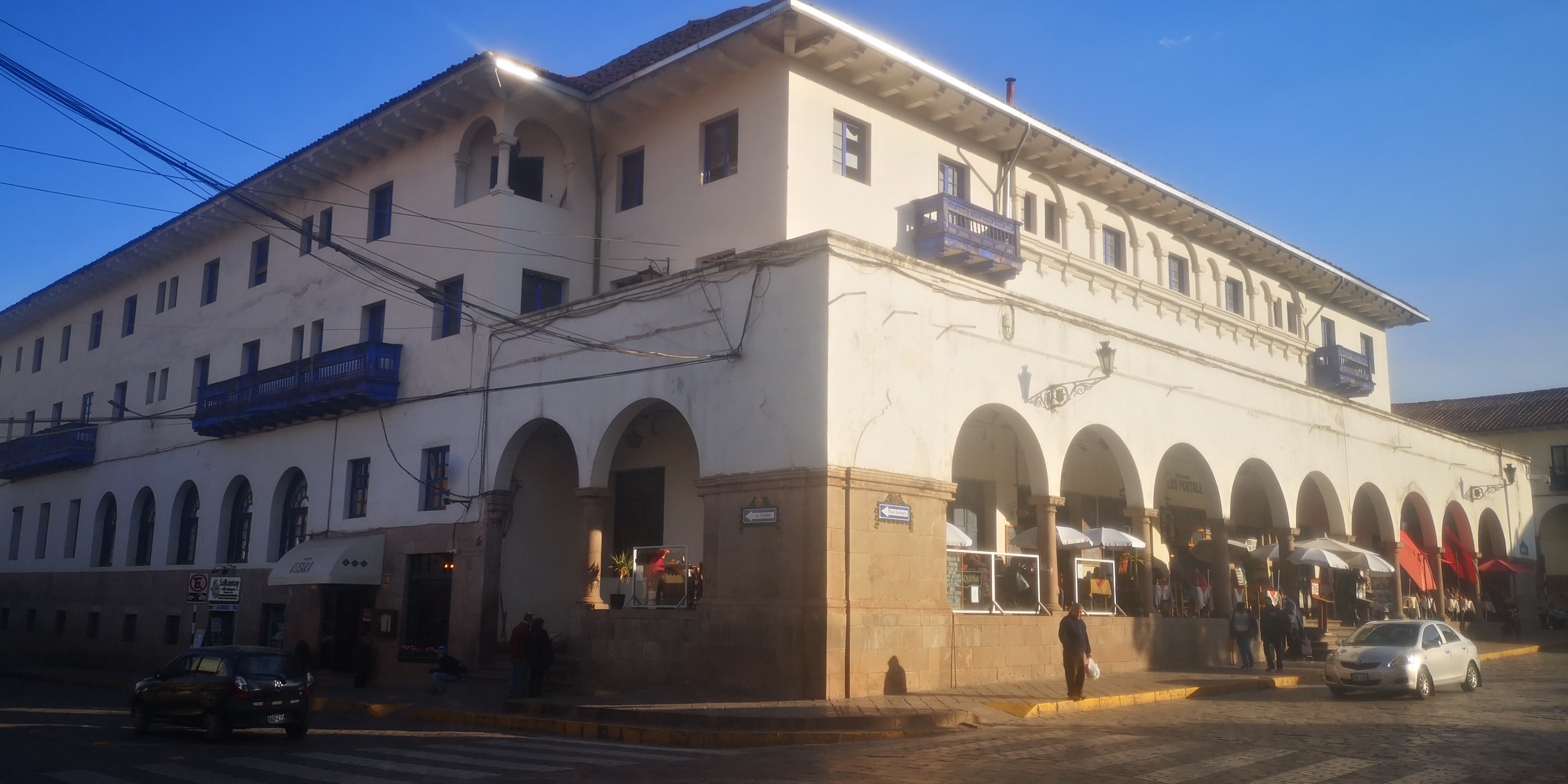
- View of the building from Portal Espinar on Plaza Regocijo
- Interactive map of the Hotel de Turistas del Cusco area
- Alternative names: El Cuadro; Cusco Mint; Hotel Cusco

General information
- Status: Unused
- Type: Hotel
- Location: Calle Heladeros 150, Cusco, Peru
- Completed: 1944
- Owner: Sociedad de Beneficencia Pública del Cusco

Technical details
- Floor count: 4
- Floor area: 1 hectare

Design and construction
- Architects: Emilio Harth Terré; José Álvarez Calderón

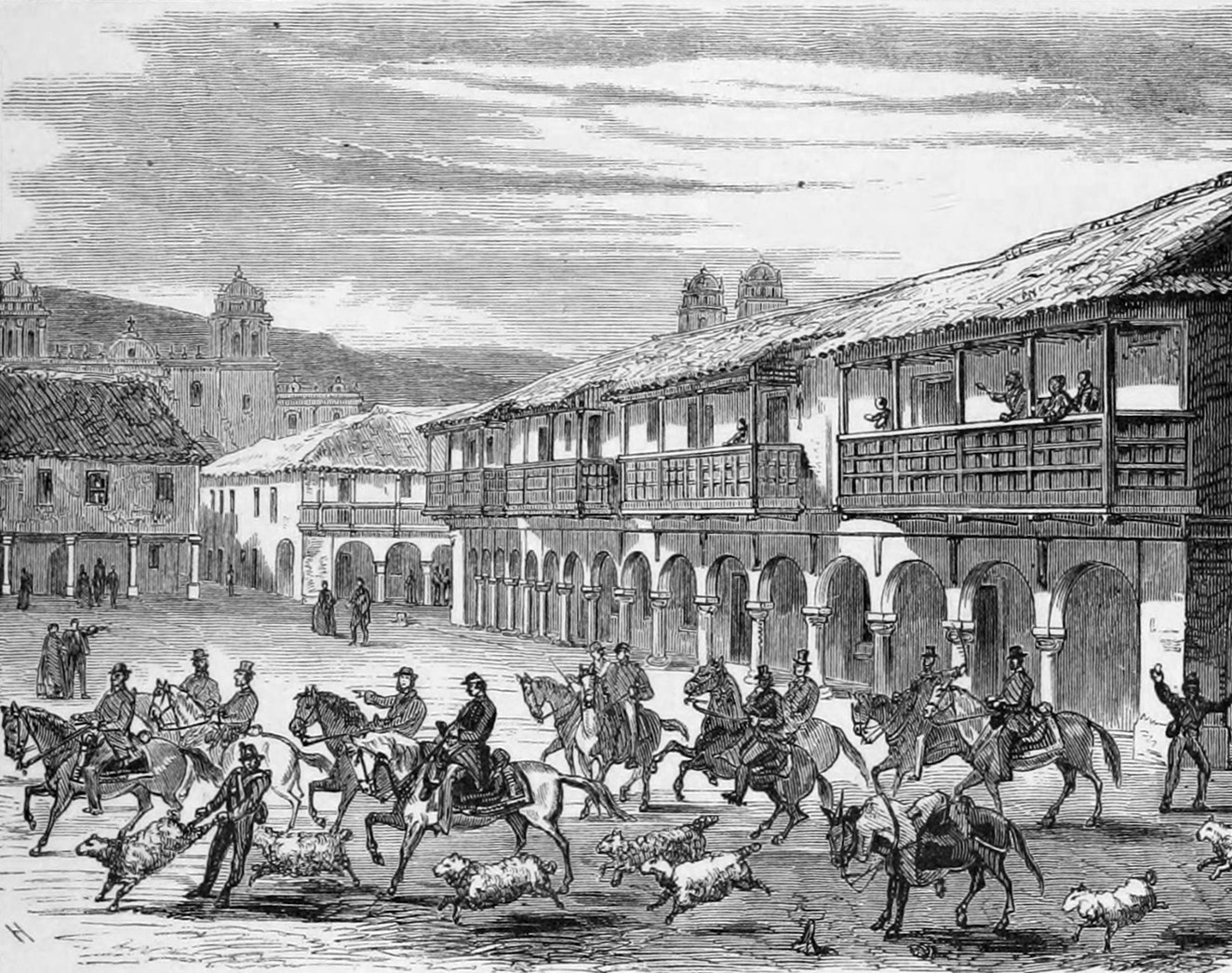
Engraving showing the balconies of the first mint of Cusco facing Plaza Regocijo

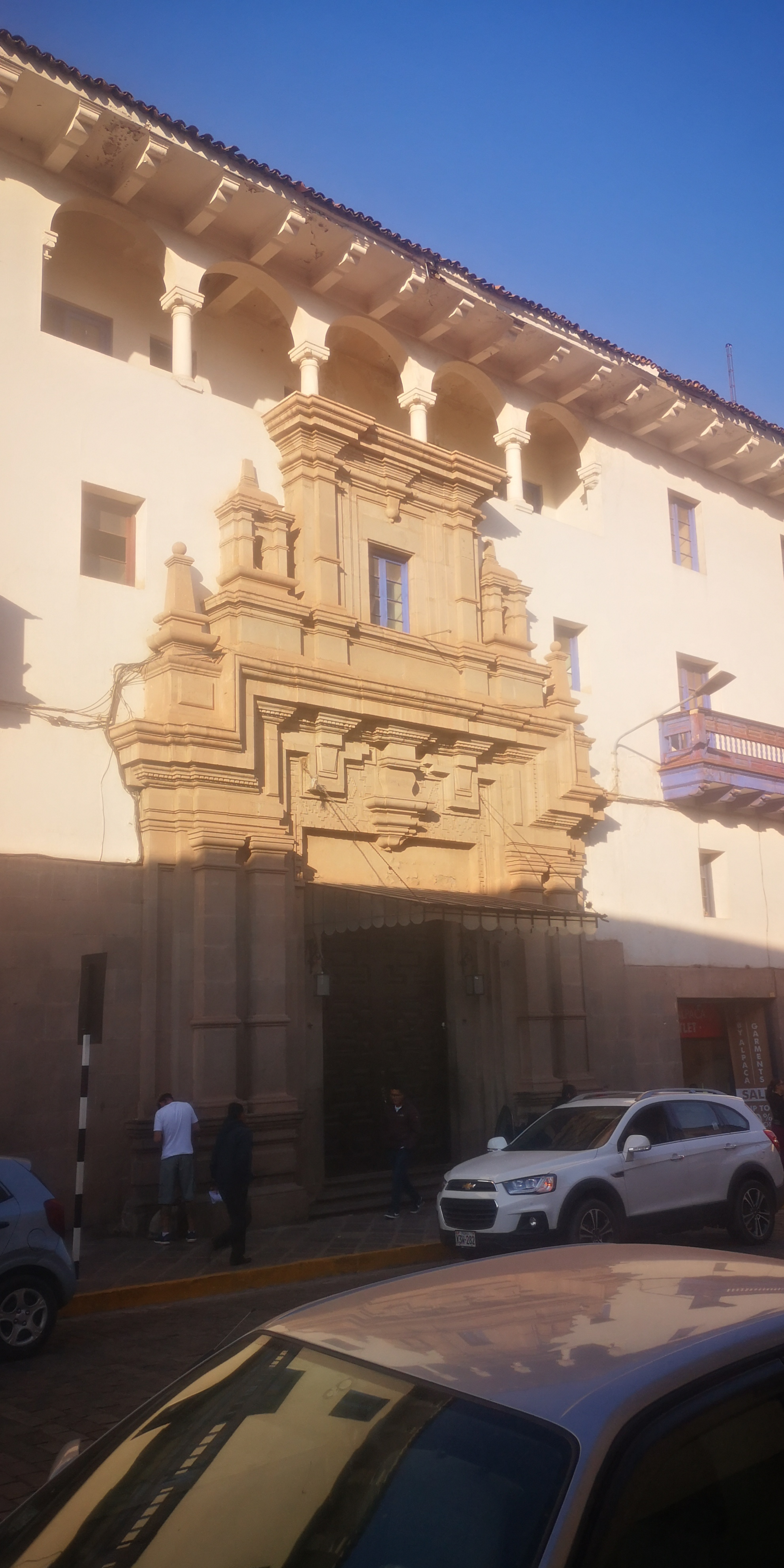
Main entrance on Calle Heladeros

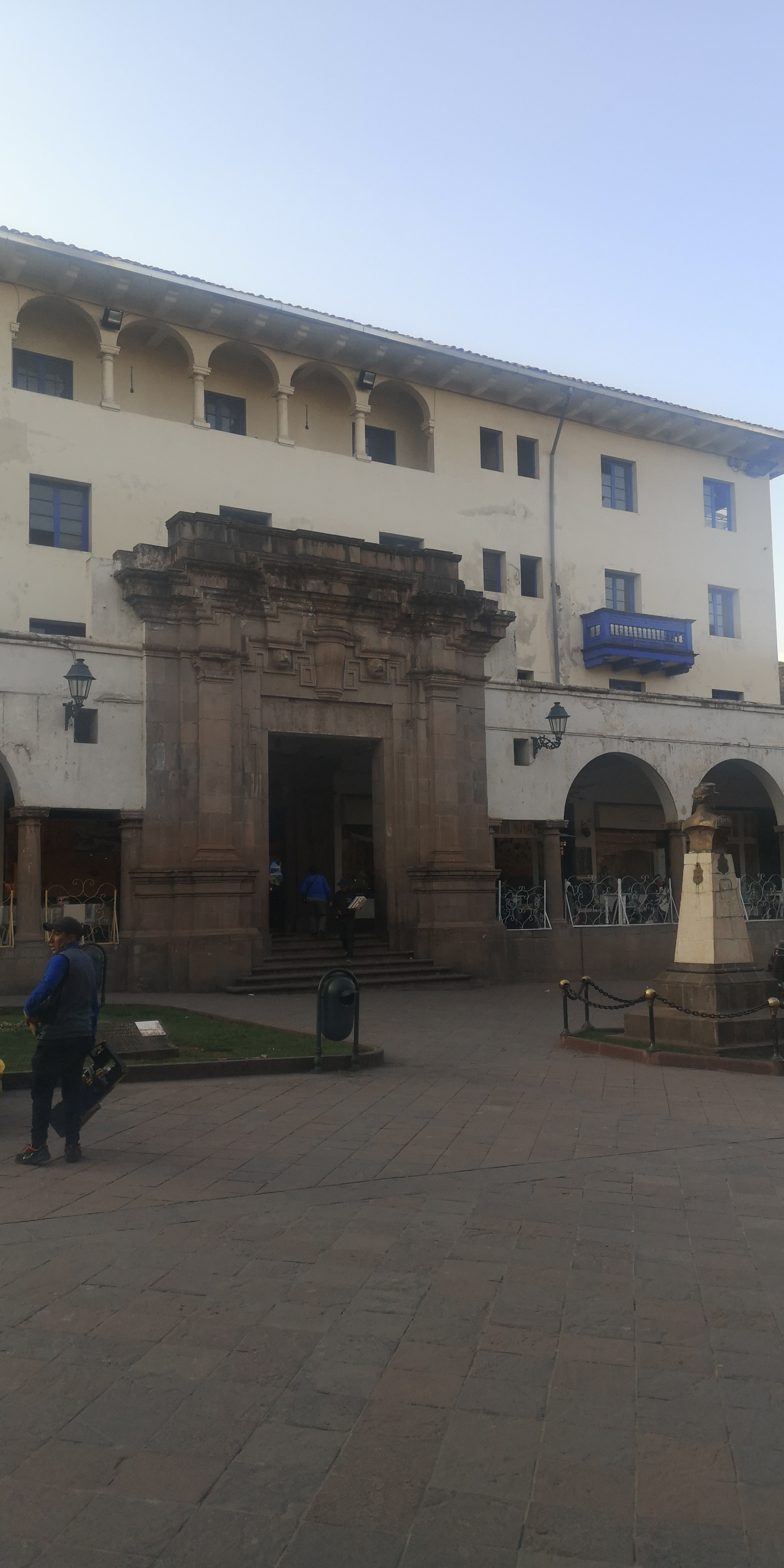
Portal of the building facing Plazoleta Espinar

The Hotel de Turistas del Cusco, popularly known as El Cuadro, is a former hotel building in the historic centre of Cusco, Peru. It is currently unused due to litigation between its owner, the Sociedad de Beneficencia Pública del Cusco, and the company that held the hotel's concession. The present building was completed in 1944 on the same plot where the first mint of Cusco was built in the late 17th century by order of Charles II of Spain.

== History ==
During the Inca period, the plot now occupied by the building formed part of the Huacaypata. Later, with the construction of the buildings on the eastern side of what is now the Plaza de Armas, the Plaza de Tlanguis was established, extending from the Cabildo to the north to La Merced Church to the south.

=== First mint of Cusco ===
On 6 January 1683, Charles II of Spain issued a royal decree ordering the reopening of the mint in Lima and the establishment of a mint in Cusco. The viceroy of Peru, Melchor de Navarra y Rocafull, objected to the plan on the grounds that a mint in Cusco might encourage counterfeiting, and he delayed its construction. The authorization responded to a local petition arising from a shortage of small change, but contrary to what the cabildo of Cusco had expected, the royal authorization allowed only the minting of gold, not silver. This change reduced local interest, even though members of the cabildo had offered the king a donation of 25,000 pesos for the mint. The authorization was later ratified by another decree of 26 February 1684.

In the face of the viceroy's objections and local disinterest, the project stalled for several years. On 13 December 1696, Fernando Calderón de la Barca was appointed justicia mayor of Cusco and promoted the construction of the mint. After a legal dispute with the Mercedarians, who claimed ownership of the chosen site, Calderón de la Barca pushed for the mint to be built in the middle of Plaza del Cabildo, reducing the square and creating a small plaza in front of the entrance to La Merced Church. Construction of this first mint began in May 1697 and was completed in July 1699, with the royal order considered fulfilled on 22 August 1699. The premises included not only the rooms necessary for coining money but also several shops that were to be rented out.

There is little evidence that the first mint performed an important function. Surviving documentation from the 18th century instead refers to its limited activity. Diego de Esquivel y Navia, as quoted by Eduardo Dargent, described the mint as a useless undertaking and stated that in 1736 the establishment was sold at auction to a local resident for 5,000 pesos, and that in 1744 it was acquired by the convent of La Merced.

=== After the mint ===
After its acquisition by the Mercedarians, the site remained in active use. By the early 20th century, the old building on the plot housed the Teatro Excélsior before being demolished for the construction of the present hotel.

=== Tourist hotel ===
In 1938, during the government of General Óscar R. Benavides, the national Plan Hotelero ("Hotel Plan") was launched as part of a broader infrastructure programme. The plan sought to create tourism infrastructure in several Peruvian cities at a time when accommodation was lacking in places with strong tourist potential. In 1938, the Ministry of Development called a competition for the construction of the Cusco hotel, the first project of the plan. According to Martuccelli, Fernando Belaúnde—then a noted Peruvian architect and later twice President of Peru—commented favourably on the competition rules, calling it one of the first architectural competitions in Peru to be conducted rigorously.

According to the same author, the competition brief called for a three-storey building with a basement and for amenities considered sophisticated at the time, including refrigeration chambers, safety deposit boxes, and an exhibition hall. The hotel's 100 rooms were to vary in size and hierarchy. On 15 July 1938, the jury, made up of architects Héctor Velarde and Augusto Guzmán, announced the winners: the Peruvian architects José Álvarez Calderón and Emilio Harth Terré, whose proposal was a neo-colonial design that can be considered part of an indigenista form of Art Deco.

In addition to its main frontage on Calle Heladeros, the building also addresses Plaza Regocijo and Plazoleta Espinar, and features open arcades on the exterior. Internally, it is arranged around two courtyards. Its construction required the demolition of the colonial building that had housed the first mint of Cusco. The hotel was completed in 1944, and then-president Manuel Prado Ugarteche attended its inauguration.

In 1989, by Resolución Jefatural No. 009-89-INC/J of 12 January, published on 26 April of the same year, the building was declared a national historical monument of Peru.

== In popular culture ==
The Hotel de Turistas became an iconic building in the city because of its location in the heart of Cusco's historic centre. Cast members of the film Secret of the Incas stayed there, and some scenes for the film were shot in the building. The film starred Charlton Heston and Yma Sumac.

Because of its geometric form, the building was also popularly known as El Cuadro.

== Bibliography ==
- Mendoza, Zoila (2006). Crear y sentir lo nuestro: folclor, identidad regional y nacional en el Cuzco, siglo XX [Creating and feeling what is ours: folklore, regional and national identity in Cuzco, 20th century] (in Spanish). Lima: Fondo Editorial de la PUCP. ISBN 9972-42-770-6.
