= Señor de los Temblores =

Peruvian statue of the crucifixion of Jesus

Lord of the Earthquakes
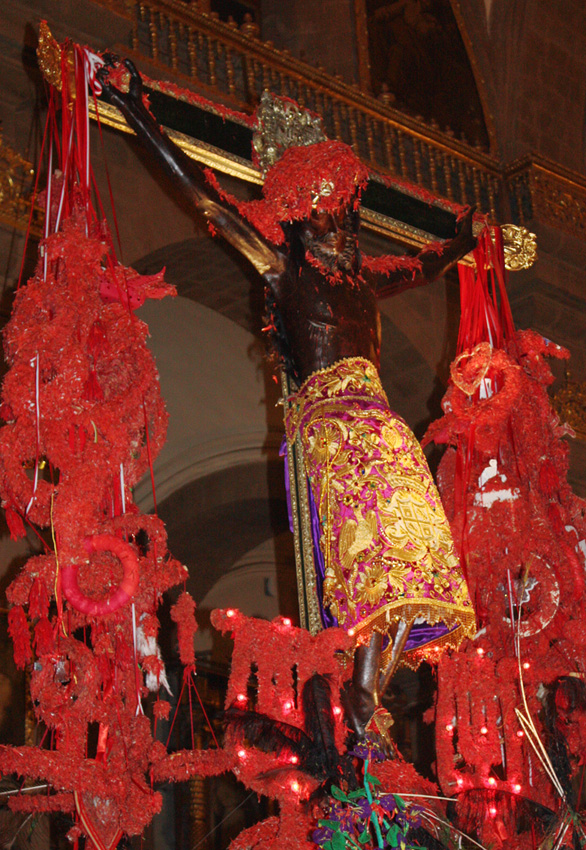
- Señor de los Temblores, Cusco
- Official name: El Señor de los Temblores
- Also called: Taytacha de los Temblores
- Observed by: Peruvians and people of Peruvian descent; Catholic Church (see calendar)
- Type: Ethnic, national, Christian
- Celebrations: Attending processions; Canticles
- Observances: Attending mass or service
- Date: Holy Monday
- Duration: Holy W month
- Frequency: Annual
- First time: 1650

Cultural Heritage of Peru
- Official name: Festividad del Señor de Los Temblores del Cusco
- Type: Intangible
- Criteria: Festivals and ritual celebrations
- Designated: 28 December 2007; 18 years ago
- Legal basis: RDN 1767/INC-2007

Señor de los Temblores (in Quechua known as Taytacha Temblores, meaning Christ or Lord of the Earthquakes) is a late 16th-century statue of the crucifixion of Jesus in Cusco Cathedral in Cusco, Peru. It is popularly believed to have reduced damage in the city during the 1650 earthquake. Taytacha Temblores became known as the patron of Cusco, and is carried in procession annually on Holy Monday. It is one of the most well-known sculptures in present-day Peru, and is represented in hundreds of paintings.

== History ==
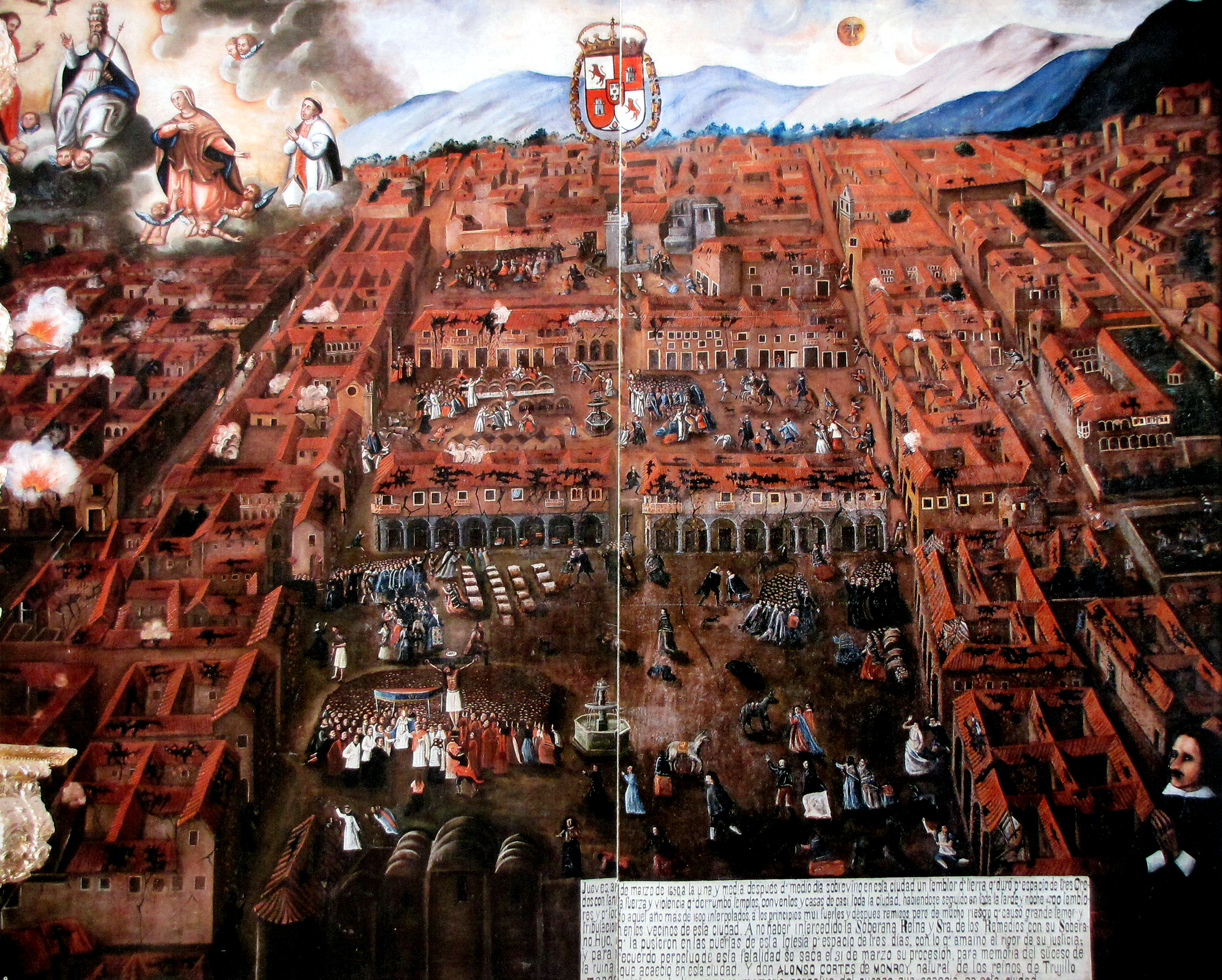
An anonymous 17th-century painting depicting the city of Cusco during the 1650 earthquake, as buildings crack apart. Christ of the Earthquakes is shown in the left foreground, carried in a procession. The sculpture is held permanently in the Cusco Cathedral.

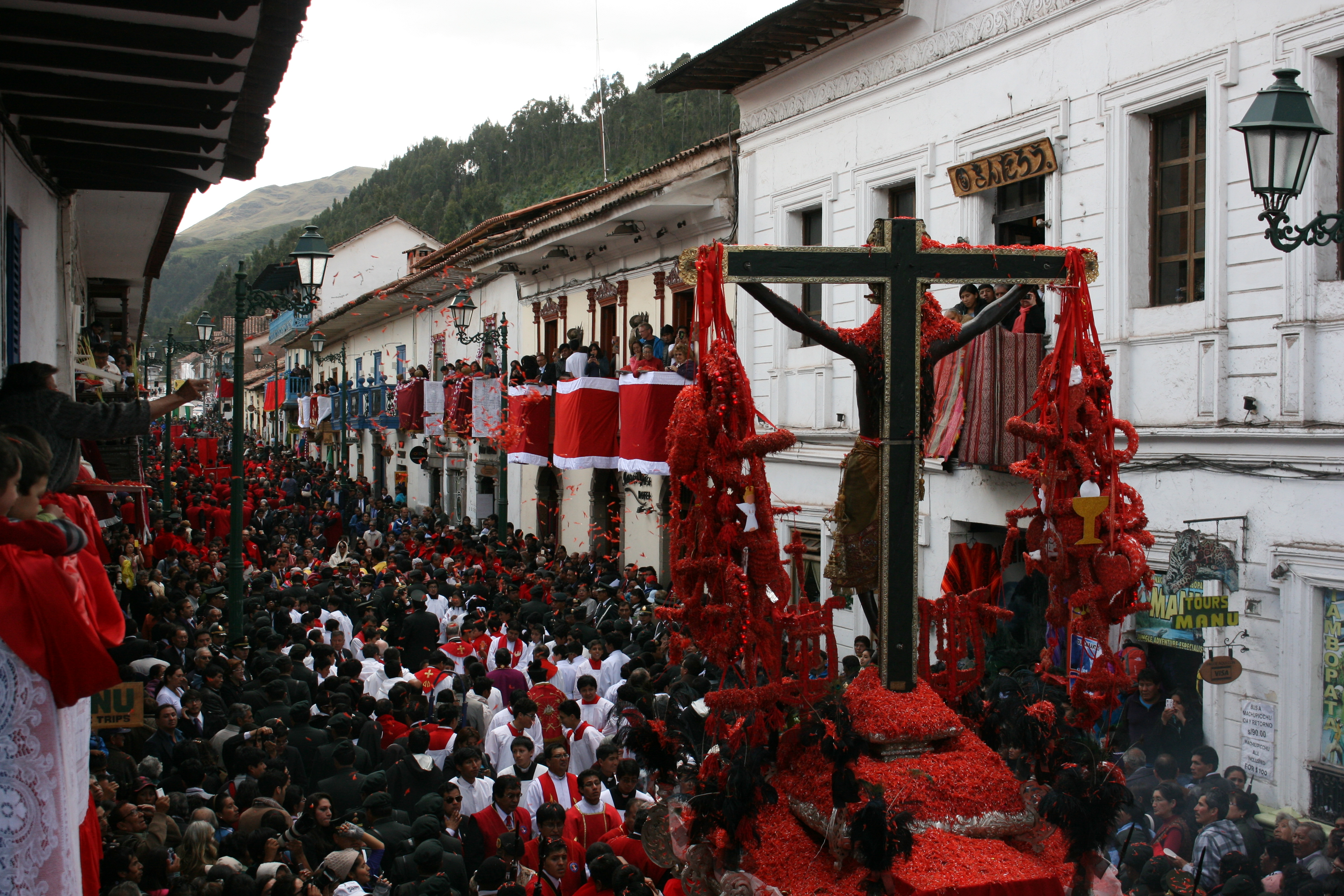
Annual procession in the streets of Cusco, Peru

The original statue is now believed to have been created in the Cusco region around 1570. However, according to popular belief, during the government of Philip II, upon hearing that the "Indians of Peru continued to worship the Sun and that in their festivities they remembered the deities of their paganism", Philip II ordered the sculpting of an image of Christ different from those venerated in Spain; it was to have a copper color and features that would allow the Indians to recognize themselves in the image. The statue was transported by ship to the Viceroyalty of Peru, where it was landed at the port of Callao. From there, the statue was to be taken to the city of Cusco. However, near its destination, in Mollepata, the chest containing the image became so heavy that could not be moved, the interpretation given by the local people was that the statue wished to remain in the town, where it was left. The muleteer then commissioned a copy a local indigenous artisan and then taken to Cusco and installed in the cathedral.

Another narration gives account of the shipment from Spain of three chests containing images, the history indicates that when the settlers of Inkillpata (Anta) found out about the event narrated previously for the Christ that stayed in Mollepata, they entertained the retinue asking for one of the images to stay with them. The muleteer again accepted and continued the journey to Cusco where he arrived with the last of the statues, which remained stored until the unfortunate day of the earthquake of 1650.

In spite of the history associated with its Hispanic origin, the technique used in the elaboration of the sculpture of the Señor de los Temblores confirms that it was a local work. This was explained in the report on the technical study carried out in 1978:

For the execution, the sculptor had to make a straw mannequin of which there are traces on which the first layers of glued cloth would be applied; once these were dry, he had to remove the straw (thus leaving the image hollow) helping himself to the effect with plaster paste; only in the hands and arms we find wooden elements, placed there because these support the image.

The historian Pedro Querejazu completes the previous explanation pointing out:

The arms have an internal wooden tenon that reaches the thorax of the image. On the general bulk of cloth, the modeling was done with maguey wood cut into small plates and partially carved, on which the final modeling would have been done with plaster paste.

== Description ==
The work is made of mixed materials, including sticks, plaques of agave fiber, and plaster. The black color is not original but the result of having been exposed for centuries to smoke and dust, the buildup of soot from candles and oil lamps, and pigment and pollen from the red ñuk'chu flowers that are showered on the statue when it is taken in procession on Holy Monday. The statue's surface has not been cleaned during recent restoration efforts, though its structure has been reinforced and insect damage mitigated.

The sculpture, of unusual features with asymmetrical anatomy, was believed to have been modeled in llama parchment, with a hollow bust and very little aesthetic value. When analyzing its composition during a restoration in 1985, the artists realized that the body was not made of parchment or camelid leather, but of linen vegetable fiber. The head is made of maguey, while the feet and hands are made of balsa wood, common materials in the Andean region. Therefore, it is considered that the Taytacha de los Temblores is autochthonous and original.

The Christ is carefully adorned. The nails of his hands and feet are of pure gold inlaid with precious stones, he had a crown of pure gold with stones weighing 1.3 kg, a gift of Viceroy Francisco de Borja y Aragon, which in the 1980s was stolen. The one he now wears is also golden, but it is lighter. With the passage of time, the images of the Virgin of Sorrows and St. John the Evangelist were added to the altar.

== See also ==
- List of statues of Jesus
