= Víctor Angles Vargas =

Peruvian historian (1927–2025)

- Born: September 9, 1927; Cuzco, Peru
- Died: February 22, 2025 (aged 97)
- Education: University of Cuzco
- Occupation: Historian

Víctor Angles Vargas (September 9, 1927 – February 22, 2025) was a Peruvian historian of Incan and Spanish periods of the history of Cuzco.

== Life and career ==
Angles was born in Cuzco on September 9, 1927, the son of Nicolas Angles and Rosa Vargas Corazao. He completed his primary studies at the Humberto Luna school in that city and his secondary studies at the National College of Sciences. He pursued higher education at the University of Cuzco, from which he graduated as a lawyer. He also has completed studies in philosophy and a doctorate in history. He was a principal professor at the same university.

Angles died on February 22, 2025, at the age of 97.
