= Francisco Becerra =

Spanish architect

Francisco Becerra (c. 1545–1605) was a Spanish architect. Born in Trujillo (Extremadura), he designed and worked on several cathedrals in the New World.

Becerra either designed the Puebla Cathedral, or worked on building it to designs by Claudio de Arciniega. He also built several convents in Puebla. He also designed a cathedral in Lima, Peru, a church in Cuzco and several bridges.
