= Sallqaqucha wallata warak'ay =

Peruvian Native American dance

Sallqaqucha wallata warak'ay (Quechua sallqa wild, qucha, lake, Sallqaqucha a lake of the Lares District, wallata Andean goose, warak'ay to hit with a sling or slingshot, which might be translated as "hitting the Andean goose of Sallqaqucha with a sling") is a typical dance of the Sacred Valley in the Cusco Region in Peru. It is mainly danced by the communities around the village and the lake named Sallqaqucha (Salcacocha, Salqa Qocha) in the Lares District of the Calca Province.

== See also ==
- Ch'iqun
- Killaqucha
- Lares trek
- Peruvian dances
- Pumawank'a
- Qhapaq Saya
- Qiwñaqucha
- Siriwani
