= Yanaorjo (Calca) =

Mountain in Peru

- Location within Peru

Highest point
- Elevation: 4,800 m (15,700 ft)
- Coordinates: 13°13′18″S 71°57′1″W

Naming
- Language of name: Quechua

Geography
- Location: Peru, Cusco Region, Calca Province
- Parent range: Andes, Urubamba

Yanaorjo (possibly from Quechua yana black, urqu mountain, "black mountain") is a mountain in the Urubamba mountain range in the Andes of Peru, about 4,800 metres (15,748 ft) high. It lies in the Cusco Region, Calca Province, Calca District. Yanaorjo is situated southeast of Sahuasiray, south of Ccerayoc, north of Ajosune or Aqosune and Apurinru, and northwest of Pumacallanca and Llamayojcasa.

The two small lakes northeast of Yanaorjo are named Ancascocha (possibly from Quechua for "blue lake") and Suirococha (possibly from Quechua for suyru a very long dress tracked after when worn, qucha lake).
