= Ancasmarca =

Mountain in Peru

- Pitusiray / Sallcasa
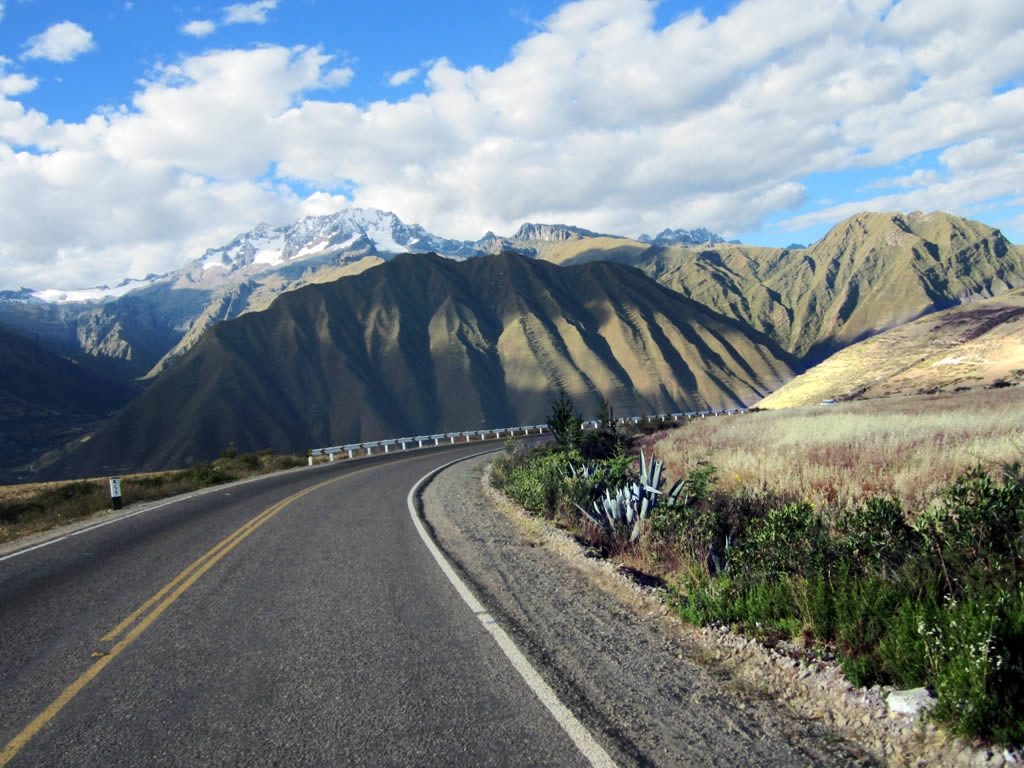
- The Urubamba mountain range as seen from the southwest. Chicón is on the left. Huamanchoque and Ancasmarca are visible on the right side in the background of this image.

Highest point
- Elevation: 5,198 m (17,054 ft)
- Coordinates: 13°15′06″S 71°59′07″W

Geography
- Location within Peru
- Location: Peru, Cusco Region
- Parent range: Andes, Urubamba

Ancasmarca, also known as Pitusiray or Sallcasa, is a 5,198-metre-high (17,054 ft) mountain in the Urubamba mountain range in the Andes of Peru. It is located in the Cusco Region, Calca Province, Calca District, north of the Vilcanota River. Ancasmarca is situated northeast of Huamanchoque, southeast of Canchacanchajasa, south of Sahuasiray, and southwest of Ccerayoc and Condorhuachana.

== Mythology ==
Around 1575, the Spaniard Cristòbal de Molina wrote about the origins of the site in Relación de las fábulas y ritos de los Incas (Account of the Fables and Rites of the Incas). According to him, after consulting with his llamas, a shepherd foresaw the great flood. He took refuge with his 6 children on top of the Ancasmarca hill, which elevated as the waters rose. When the water cleared, the shepherd's children repopulated the region. For Molina, this was proof that the Andes had experienced the great flood told in the Bible by Noah. Other versions of the story explain that the llamas were sad because the stars were high in the sky and the animals understood what was coming.

== Etymology ==
The word Ancasmarca is of Quechua origin and could have two different meanings:

- Anqas or ancash: blue; marka: village; "blue village"
- Anca: eagle; marka: village: "village inhabited by eagles"

== See also ==
- Periodization of pre-Columbian Peru
- Ancient Peru
