= Chulluncunayoc =

Mountain in Peru

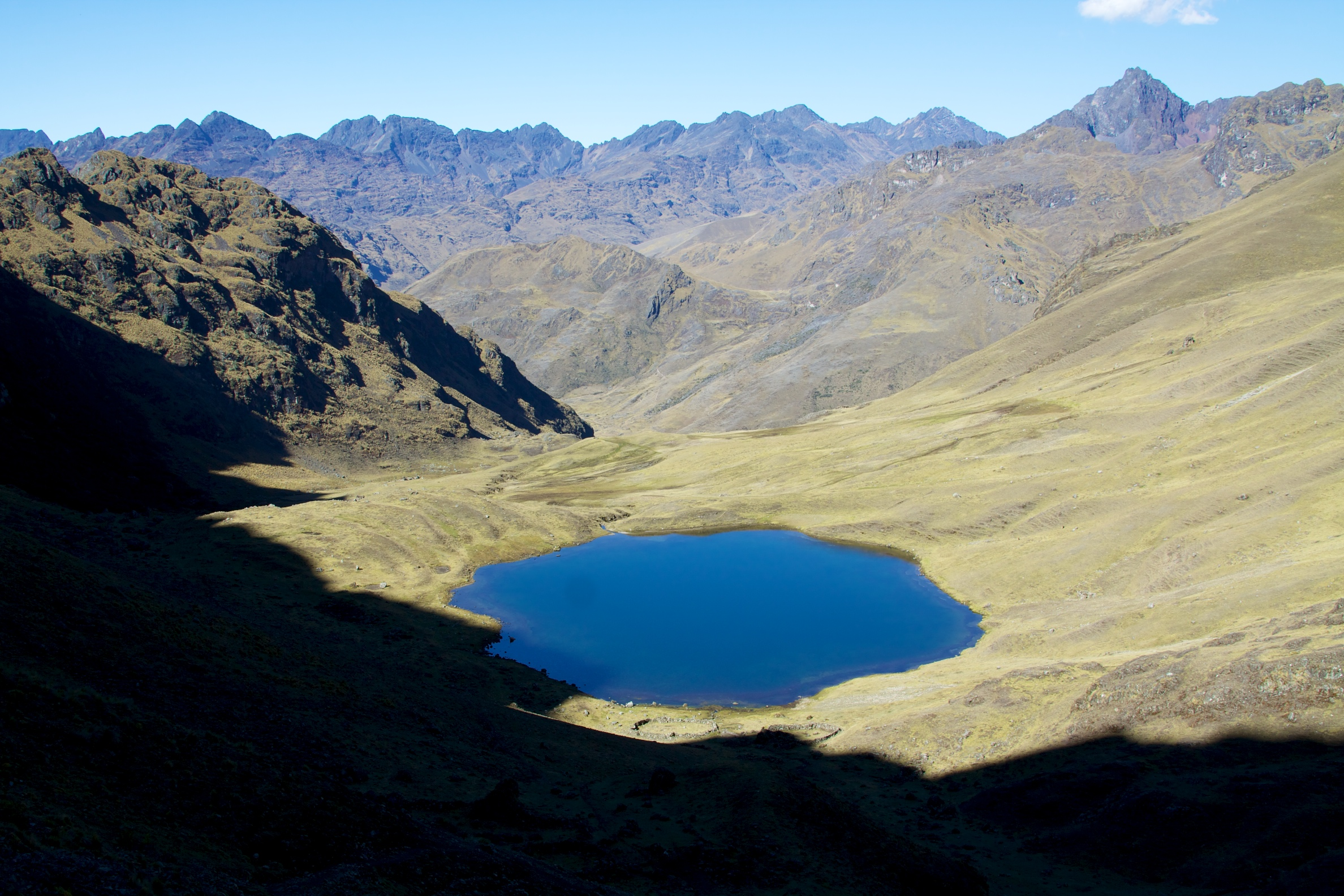
- Chulluncunayoc (center-right, in the background) and Pucaorjo (on the right) as seen from Queuñacocha

Highest point
- Elevation: 4,800 m (15,700 ft)
- Coordinates: 13°11′22″S 71°55′35″W

Naming
- Language of name: Quechua

Geography
- Location within Peru
- Location: Peru, Cusco Region, Calca Province
- Parent range: Andes

Chulluncunayoc (possibly from Quechua chhullunku, chhullunka, icicle / ice, -na, -yuq suffixes) is a mountain in the Andes of Peru, about 4,800 metres (15,748 ft) high. It lies in the Cusco Region, Calca Province, Calca District, east of the Urubamba mountain range. Chulluncunayoc is situated northeast of Ccerayoc and Pachacútec and southwest of Yanacaca (possibly from Quechua for "black rock").
