= Chaquicocha (mountain) =

Mountain in Peru

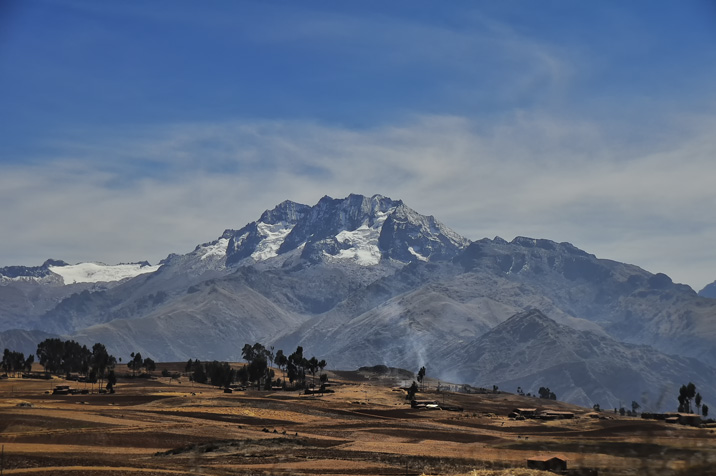
- Chicón (center) and Chaquicocha (on the right)

Highest point
- Elevation: 4,895 m (16,060 ft)
- Coordinates: 13°15′51″S 72°02′53″W

Geography
- Location within Peru Location within South America
- Location: Peru
- Parent range: Andes, Urubamba

Chaquicocha (possibly from Quechua ch'aki dry, qucha lake, "dry lake", Hispanicized spelling Chaquicocha) is a 4,895-metre-high (16,060 ft) mountain at a little lake of that name in the Urubamba mountain range in the Andes of Peru. It is located in the Cusco Region, Calca Province, Calca District, and in the Urubamba Province, in the districts of Huayllabamba and Yucay. It lies southwest of Huamanchoque and southeast of Chicon.

The lake named Chaquicocha is in the Yucay District south of the mountain at 13°16′40″S 72°03′01″W. It is about 8 m (26 ft) deep and its area is about two ha. Like Yanacocha ("black lake") south of it Chaquicocha is surrounded by woods of queñua or quewiña (polylepis).

== See also ==
- Lares trek
- Machu Qullqa
