= Maquimaquiyoc =

Mountain in Peru

- Location within Peru

Highest point
- Elevation: 4,200 m (13,800 ft)
- Coordinates: 13°17′07″S 71°57′21″W

Geography
- Location: Peru
- Parent range: Andes, Urubamba

Maquimaquiyoc (possibly from Quechua maki hand, maki maki a kind of tree with fingered leaves (Oreopanax incisus), -yuq a suffix, "the one with the maki maki tree) is a mountain in the eastern extensions of the Urubamba mountain range in the Andes of Peru, about 4,200 m (13,800 ft) high. It is located in the Cusco Region, Calca Province, Calca District. It lies east of Coscojahuarina and southeast of Huamanchoque and Pitusiray.
