= Parorjo =

Mountain in Peru

- Location within Peru

Highest point
- Elevation: 4,891 m (16,047 ft)
- Coordinates: 13°10′31″S 72°03′10″W

Geography
- Location: Peru
- Parent range: Andes, Urubamba

Parorjo (possibly from Quechua paru brownish, grey-brown, urqu mountain) is a mountain in the Urubamba mountain range in the Andes of Peru. It is situated in the Cusco Region, Calca Province, Lares District. Its summit is 4,891 m (16,047 ft) high. Parorjo is situated at the Lares trek north of Chicón and Sirihuani and west of Pucaorjo ("red mountain"). One of the nearest populated places is Quishuarani. There is a small lake at its feet named Parococha.

== See also ==
- Queuñacocha
