= Pucaccocha (Lares) =

Mountain in Peru

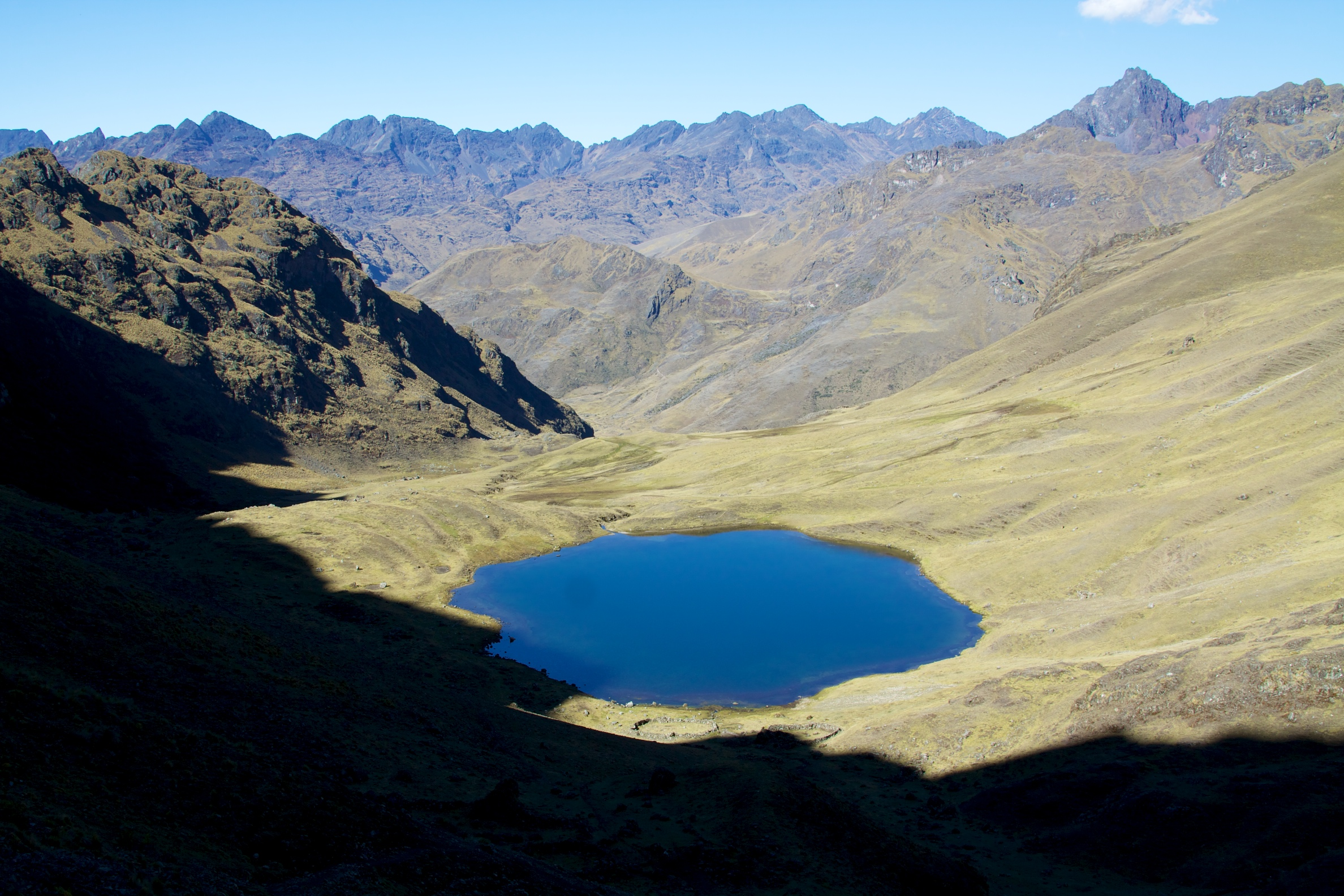
- Pucaccocha (in the background, on the left) as seen from Queuñacocha

Highest point
- Elevation: 4,600 m (15,100 ft)
- Coordinates: 13°08′10″S 71°57′31″W

Geography
- Location within Peru
- Location: Peru
- Parent range: Andes

Pucaccocha (possibly from Quechua puka red, qucha lake, "red lake") is a mountain in the Andes of Peru, about 4,600 m (15,100 ft) high It is located in the Cusco Region, Calca Province, Lares District. It lies in the eastern extensions of the Urubamba mountain range, northeast of Sahuasiray.
