= Jatun Huiscana =

Mountain in Peru

- Location within Peru

Highest point
- Elevation: 4,600 m (15,100 ft)
- Coordinates: 13°10′28″S 71°59′26″W

Naming
- Language of name: Quechua

Geography
- Location: Peru, Cusco Region, Calca Province, Lares District
- Parent range: Andes, Urubamba

Jatun Huiscana (possibly from Quechua hatun big, wisq'ana lock, wiskana a kind of pickaxe, "big lock" or "big pickaxe") is a mountain in the Urubamba mountain range in the Andes of Peru, about 4,600 metres (15,092 ft) high. It lies in the Cusco Region, Calca Province, Lares District. Jatun Huiscana is situated northwest of Ccerayoc and Yanaorcco, and northeast of Sahuasiray.
