= Qusqu Qhawarina (disambiguation) =

Qusqu Qhawarina (Quechua qusqu boundary stone; nucleus; navel; heap of earth and stones; bed, dry bed of a lake, Qusqu Cusco (a city), qhawarina viewpoint, Hispanicized spellings Coscocahuarina, Cusco Jahuarina, Coscojahuarina, Cuzcoccahuarina, Qosqoccahuarina, Qosqoqahuarina) may refer to:

- Qusqu Qhawarina, a mountain in the Canchis Province, Cusco Region, Peru
- Qusqu Qhawarina (Calca), a mountain near Calca in the Calca District, Calca Province, Cusco Region, Peru
- Qusqu Qhawarina (Quispicanchi), a mountain in the Quispicanchi Province, Cusco Region, Peru
- Qusqu Qhawarina (Totora), a mountain near Totora in the Calca District, Calca Province, Cusco Region, Peru
- Qusqu Qhawarina, Urubamba, an area of conservation in the Urubamba Province, Cusco Region, Peru
