= Pukaqucha (Calca) =

Mountain in Peru

- Location within Peru

Highest point
- Elevation: 4,400 m (14,400 ft)
- Coordinates: 13°14′32″S 71°51′55″W

Geography
- Location: Peru
- Parent range: Andes

Pukaqucha (Quechua puka red, qucha lake, "red lake", Hispanicized spelling Pucacocha) is a mountain in the Andes of Peru, about 4,400 m (14,400 ft) high. It is located in the Cusco Region, Calca Province, Calca District, east of the Urupampa mountain range and northwest of Suntur. The mountain is surrounded by some smaller lakes including Pampaqucha, Mankhaqucha, Q'umirqucha, Suntuqucha and Llulluchayuq.
