= Lares District =

Coordinates: 13.1040°S 72.0448°W

Lares
- District
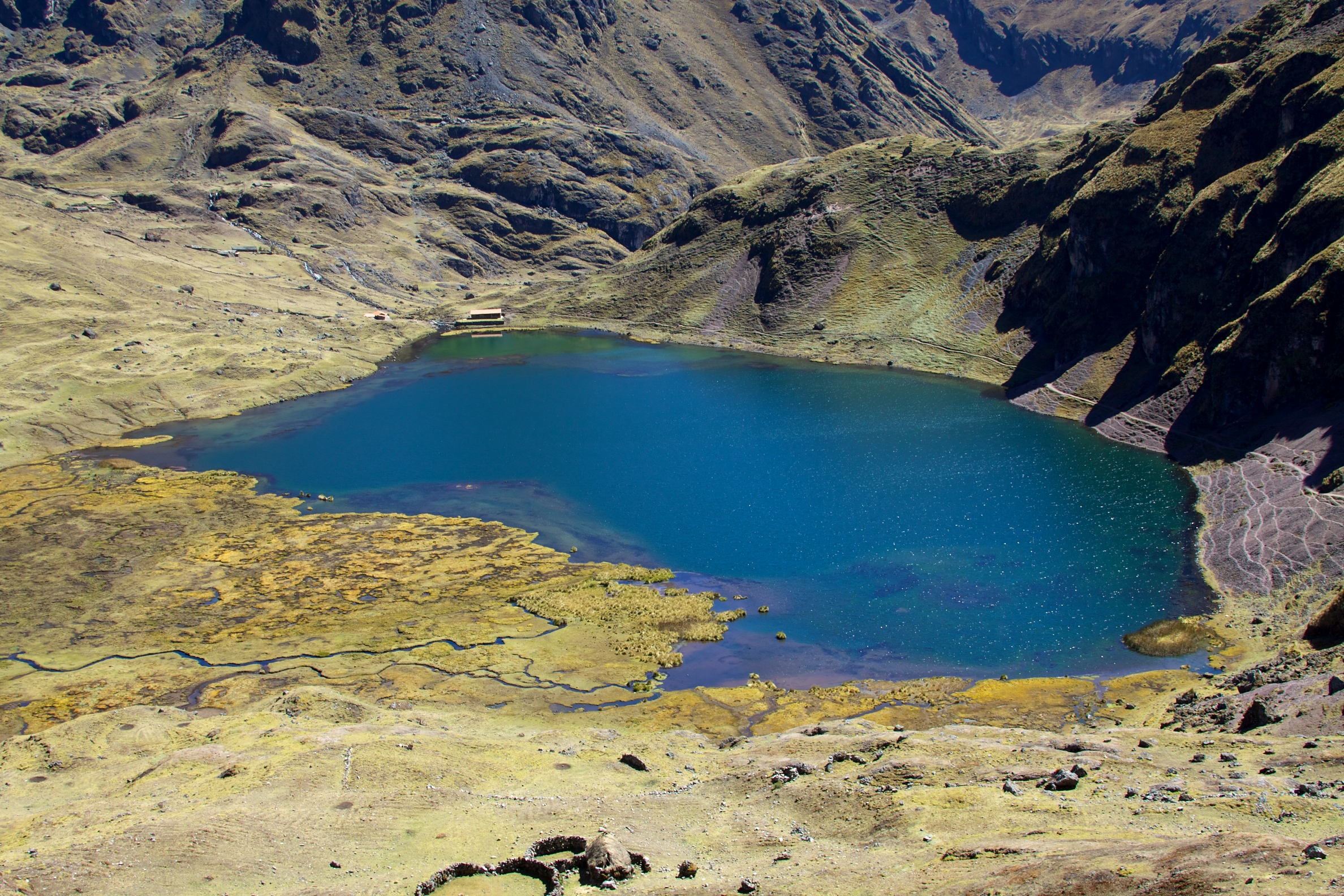
- A lake at the Lares trek
- Interactive map of Lares
- Country: Peru
- Region: Cusco
- Province: Calca
- Capital: Lares

Government
  - Mayor: Cirilo Huamanquispe Huancahuire

Area
  - Total: 527.26 km^{2} (203.58 sq mi)
- Elevation: 3,150 m (10,330 ft)

Population (2005 census)
  - Total: 6,251
  - Density: 11.86/km^{2} (30.71/sq mi)
- Time zone: UTC-5 (PET)
- UBIGEO: 080404

Lares District is one of eight districts of the province Calca in Peru.

== Geography ==
The Urupampa mountain range traverses the district. One of the highest peaks of the district is Sawasiray at 5,818 m (19,088 ft). Other mountains are listed below:

- Achupallayuq
- Asul Urqu
- Chawpi Urqu
- Ch'iqun
- Hatun Wisq'ana
- Kiswar Chaka
- Kiswarani
- Kunkani Punta
- Kuntur Qaqa
- Niwayuq
- Pachakutiq
- Paru Urqu
- Puka Urqu
- Pukaqucha
- Pumawank'a
- Puñayuq
- P'unqu Q'asa
- Qullpa Qaqa
- Quri Wayrachina
- Qhapaq Saya
- Rit'ipata
- Sallqayuq
- Saywayuq
- Siriwani
- Surayuq
- Tawa Urqu
- T'uturayuq
- Yana Chukchu
- Yanaqucha
- Yana Urqu

== Ethnic groups ==
The people in the district are mainly indigenous citizens of Quechua descent. Quechua is the language which the majority of the population (94.91%) learnt to speak in childhood, 4.77% of the residents started speaking using the Spanish language (2007 Peru Census).

== See also ==
- Killaqucha
- Qiwñaqucha
- Sallqaqucha Wallata Warak'ay
