= Condorhuachana (Cusco) =

Mountain in Peru

- Location within Peru

Highest point
- Elevation: 5,073 m (16,644 ft)
- Coordinates: 13°13′28″S 71°58′27″W

Geography
- Location: Peru, Cusco Region
- Parent range: Urubamba mountain range

Condorhuachana (possibly from Quechua kuntur condor, wacha birth, to give birth, -na a suffix, 'where the condor is born') is a 5,073-metre-high (16,644 ft) mountain in the Urubamba mountain range in the Andes of Peru. It is located in the Cusco Region, Calca Province, Calca District, north of the Vilcanota River. Condorhuachana is situated northeast of Huamanchoque, southeast of Sirihuani and Sahuasiray, and southwest of Ccerayoc.

== See also ==
- Kuntur Wachana (film)
- Pucaorjo
