= Calca District =

Coordinates: 13.3232°S 71.9785°W

Calca Khallka
- District
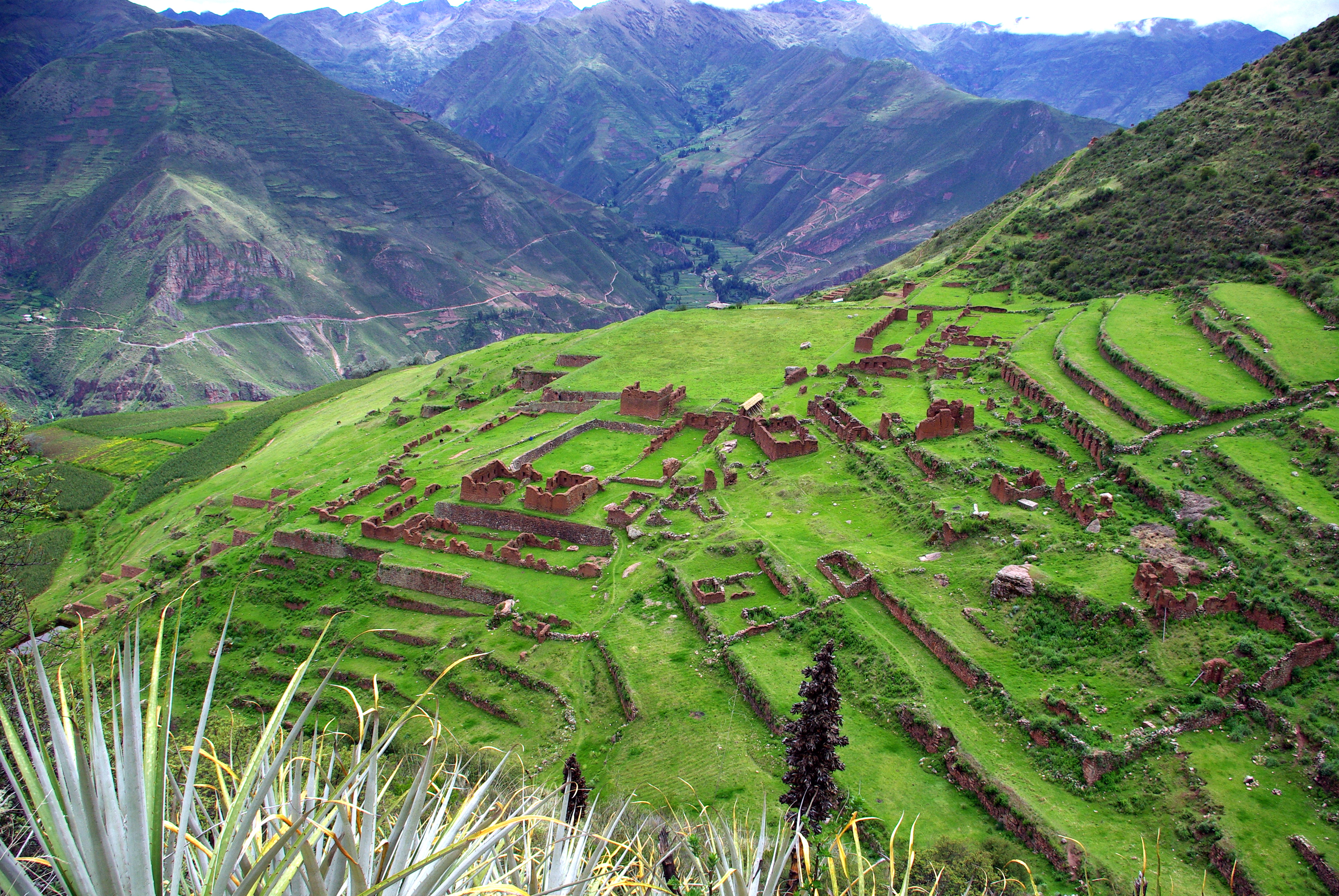
- Huch'uy Qusqu
- Interactive map of Calca
- Country: Peru
- Region: Cusco
- Province: Calca
- Capital: Calca

Government
  - Mayor: Ciriaco Condori Cruz

Area
  - Total: 311.01 km^{2} (120.08 sq mi)
- Elevation: 2,928 m (9,606 ft)

Population (2005 census)
  - Total: 18,491
  - Density: 59.455/km^{2} (153.99/sq mi)
- Time zone: UTC-5 (PET)
- UBIGEO: 080401

Calca District is one of eight districts of the province Calca in Peru. The capital of the district is Calca, also known as the capital of the Sacred Valley.

== Geography ==
Some of the highest mountains of the Urupampa mountain range, Ch'iqun, Q'irayuq, Sawasiray and Siriwani, lie in the northwestern part of the Calca District. Other mountains of the district are listed below:

- Anqasmarka
- Asul Urqu
- Aya Urqu
- Chhullunkunayuq
- Ch'akiqucha
- Hatun Punta
- Huch'uy Raqha Kay
- Kancha Kancha Q'asa
- Kuntur Wachana
- Llamayuq Q'asa
- Maki Makiyuq
- Mullu Urqu
- Pachakutiq
- Pintasqa Wayq'u
- Pitusiray
- Puka Q'asa
- Pukaqucha
- Pukyupata
- Puma Kallanka
- Qusqu Qhawarina
- Qusqu Qhawarina (Calca)
- Sapan Sach'ayuq
- Silla Q'asa
- Suntur
- Wallata Wachana
- Wamanchuqi
- Yana Qaqa
- Yana Urqu

== Climate ==
Climate data for Calca, elevation 2,926 m (9,600 ft), (1963–1998)
Month	Jan	Feb	Mar	Apr	May	Jun	Jul	Aug	Sep	Oct	Nov	Dec	Year
Mean daily maximum °C (°F)	21.5 (70.7)	21.8 (71.2)	21.8 (71.2)	22.5 (72.5)	22.6 (72.7)	22.2 (72.0)	22.3 (72.1)	22.6 (72.7)	23.0 (73.4)	23.4 (74.1)	23.2 (73.8)	22.3 (72.1)	22.4 (72.4)
Daily mean °C (°F)	14.6 (58.3)	14.7 (58.5)	14.7 (58.5)	14.1 (57.4)	13.1 (55.6)	11.9 (53.4)	11.6 (52.9)	12.7 (54.9)	14.1 (57.4)	15.0 (59.0)	15.5 (59.9)	15.0 (59.0)	13.9 (57.1)
Mean daily minimum °C (°F)	7.8 (46.0)	7.6 (45.7)	7.4 (45.3)	5.7 (42.3)	3.4 (38.1)	1.3 (34.3)	0.9 (33.6)	2.7 (36.9)	5.0 (41.0)	6.6 (43.9)	7.7 (45.9)	7.7 (45.9)	5.3 (41.6)
Average precipitation mm (inches)	112.0 (4.41)	93.4 (3.68)	82.2 (3.24)	35.0 (1.38)	5.1 (0.20)	5.2 (0.20)	3.1 (0.12)	7.7 (0.30)	13.2 (0.52)	33.4 (1.31)	60.0 (2.36)	83.7 (3.30)	534 (21.02)
Average relative humidity (%)	72.4	72.8	72.1	69.9	65.8	63.2	61.7	61.7	61.9	62.4	64.1	68.5	66.4
Source: Repositorio Institucional Continental

== See also ==
- Huch'uy Qusqu
- Llamayuq
