= Kiswarani (Cusco) =

Mountain in Peru

- Location within Peru

Highest point
- Elevation: 4,600 m (15,100 ft)
- Coordinates: 13°8′18″S 72°2′29″W

Geography
- Location: Peru, Cusco Region
- Parent range: Andes

Kiswarani (Aymara kiswara Buddleja incana, -ni a suffix to indicate ownership, "the one with kiswara", Hispanicized spelling Quisuarani) is a mountain in the Andes of Peru. Its summit reaches about 4,600 m (15,092 ft) above sea level. The mountain is located in the Cusco Region, Calca Province, Lares District, south of Lares. The village of Kiswarani and the Kiswarani River lie at its feet.

The private conservation area of 'Hatun Qiwña Kiswarani Qullana' (Hatun Queuña Quishuarani Collana) of the rural community of Kiswarani Qullana (Quishuarani Collana) lies at the mountain. It was founded in 2009. The aim of the project is to protect the polylepis pepei. The small area includes the southern slope of Kiswarani in the north and the lake Qiwñaqucha in the south.

== See also ==
- Lares trek
