= Pachakutiq (Cusco) =

Mountain in Peru

- Location within Peru

Highest point
- Elevation: 4,400 m (14,400 ft)
- Coordinates: 13°11′48″S 71°56′36″W

Geography
- Location: Peru, Cusco Region
- Parent range: Andes

Pachakutiq (Quechua pacha time, space, kuti return, "return of time", "change of time", pacha kuti "great change or disturbance in the social or political order", -q a suffix, Pachakutiq an Inca emperor, Hispanicized spelling Pachacútec) is a mountain in the Andes of Peru, about 4,400 metres (14,436 ft) high. It is located in the Cusco Region, Calca Province, on the border of the districts Calca and Lares. Pachakutiq is situated east of the Urupampa mountain range. It lies north-east of the mountain Q'irayuq and south-west of the mountains Yanaqaqa and Chhullunkunayuq.
