= Yanaorcco (Calca) =

Mountain in Peru

- Location within Peru

Highest point
- Elevation: 4,800 m (15,700 ft)
- Coordinates: 13°11′29″S 71°58′30″W

Naming
- Language of name: Quechua

Geography
- Location: Peru, Cusco Region, Calca Province, Lares District
- Parent range: Andes, Urubamba

Yanaorcco (possibly from Quechua yana black, urqu mountain, "black mountain") is a mountain in the Urubamba mountain range in the Andes of Peru, about 4,800 metres (15,748 ft) high. It lies in the Cusco Region, Calca Province, Lares District. Yanaorcco is situated northwest of Ccerayoc and northeast of Sahuasiray.
