= Quriqucha =

Quriqucha (Quechua quri gold, qucha lake, "gold lake", also spelled Ccoricocha, Coricocha, Curicocha, Joricocha, Qoricocha, Qoriqocha) may refer to:

- Quriqucha (Apurímac), a lake in the Apurímac Region, Peru
- Quriqucha (Cusco), a lake in the Cusco Region, Peru
- Quriqucha (Huánuco), a mountain at a small lake of that name in the Huánuco Region, Peru
- Quriqucha (Junín), a mountain in the Junín Region, Peru
