= Queuñacocha =

Lake in Peru

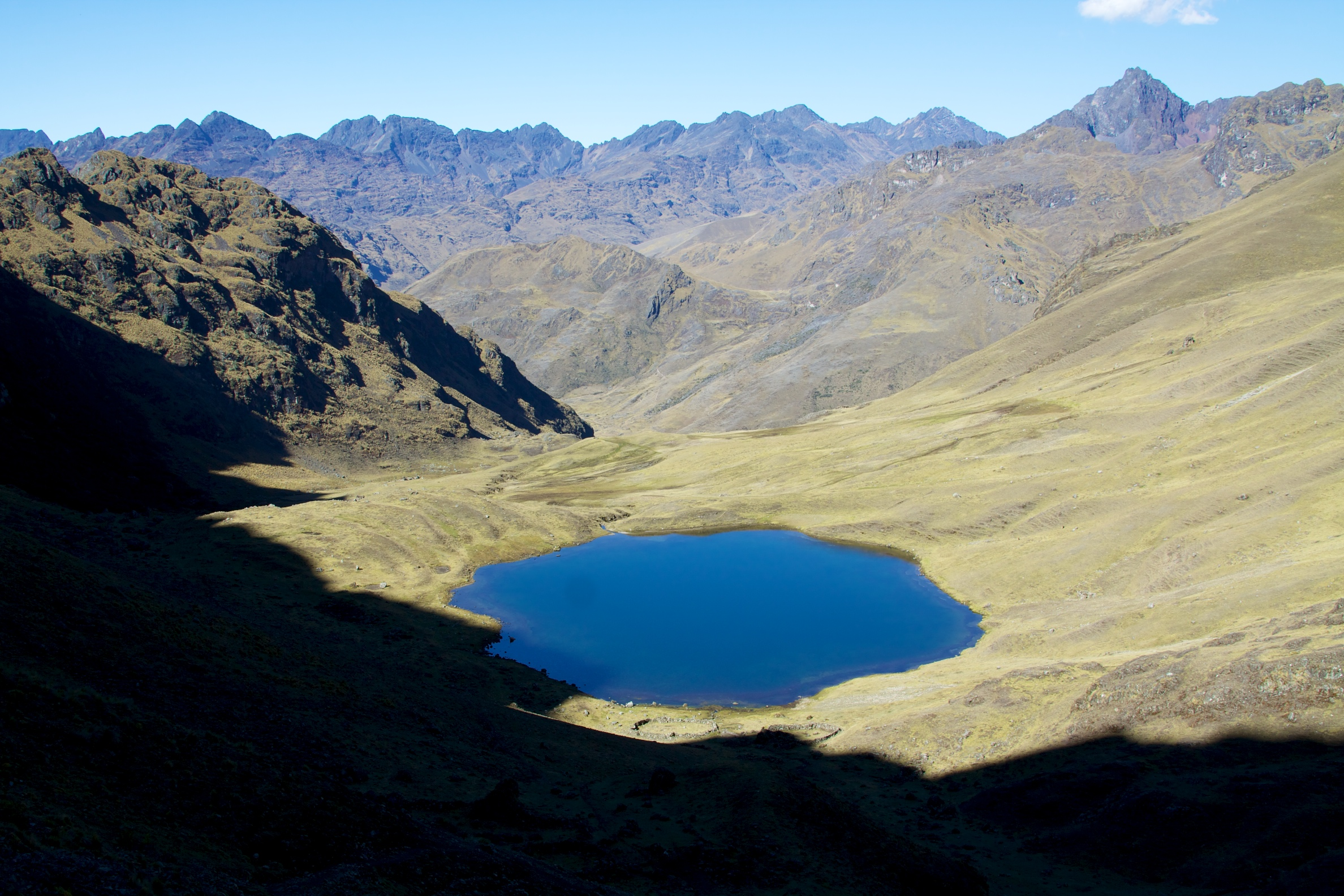

- Location within Peru
- Location: Cusco Region
- Coordinates: 13°09′14″S 72°02′49″W
- Basin countries: Peru
- Max. length: 0.2 km (0.12 mi)
- Max. width: 0.14 km (0.087 mi)
- Surface elevation: 4,170 m (13,680 ft)

Queuñacocha (possibly from Quechua qiwña, qiwuña polylepis, qucha lake) or Hatun Queuñacocha is a small lake in the Urubamba mountain range of the Cusco Region, Lares District, Calca Province, Peru. The lake lies north of Chicón, Sirihuani and Parorjo and southwest of Quisuarani, at an altitude of about 4,170 m. It is 200 metres (660 ft) long, and 140 metres (460 ft) wide at its widest point. West of it there is another small lake called Quellacocha.

Queuñacocha lies in the private conservation area 'Hatun Queuña Quishuarani Collana' (possibly from in the Quechua spelling Hatun Qiwña Kiswarani Qullana) of the rural community Quishuarani Collana, founded in 2009 to protect the threatened polylepis pepei plant.

== Images ==
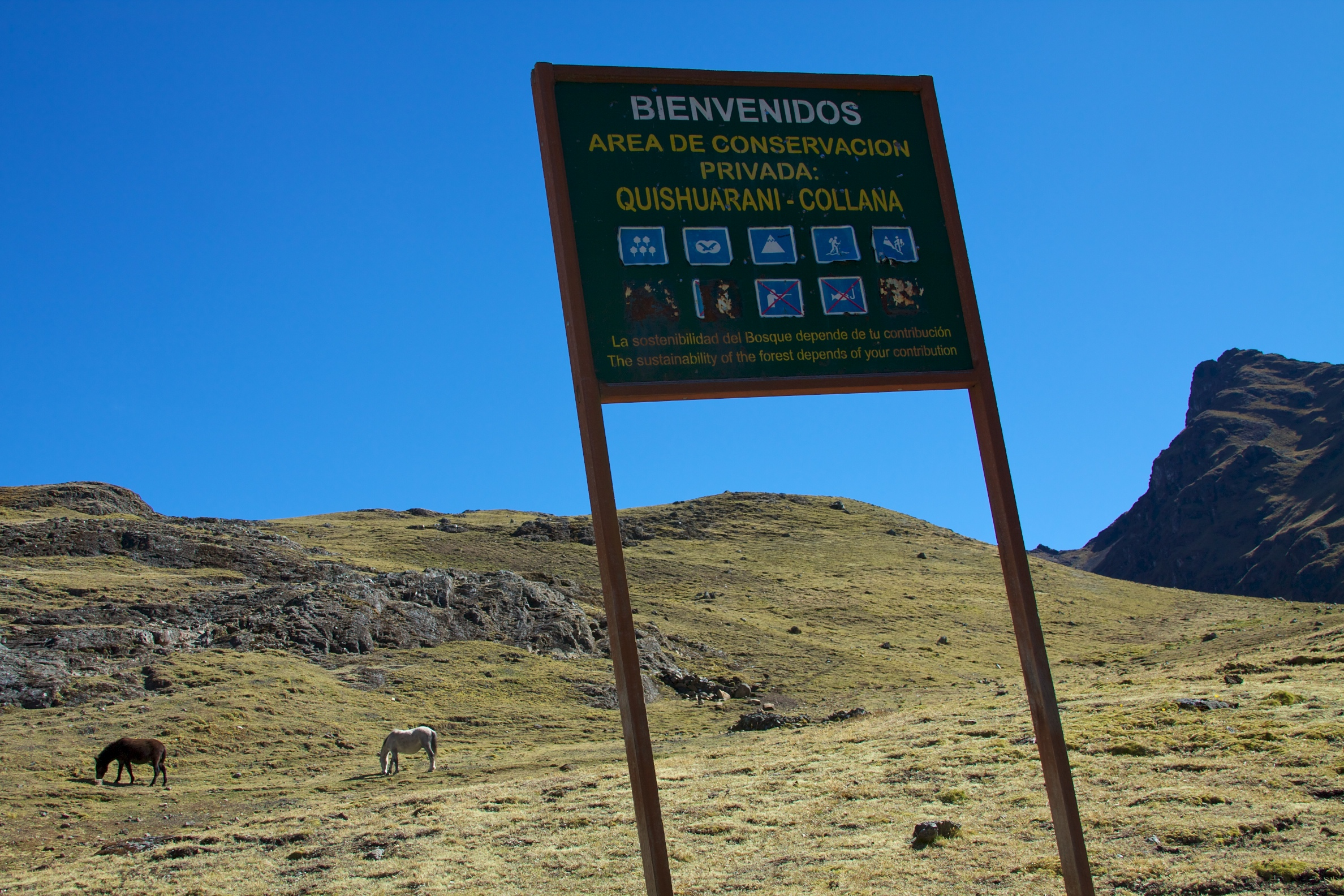
Sign for the private conservation area of 'Hatun Qiwña Kiswarani Qullana'

== See also ==
- List of lakes in Peru
