= Quellacocha =

Lake in Peru

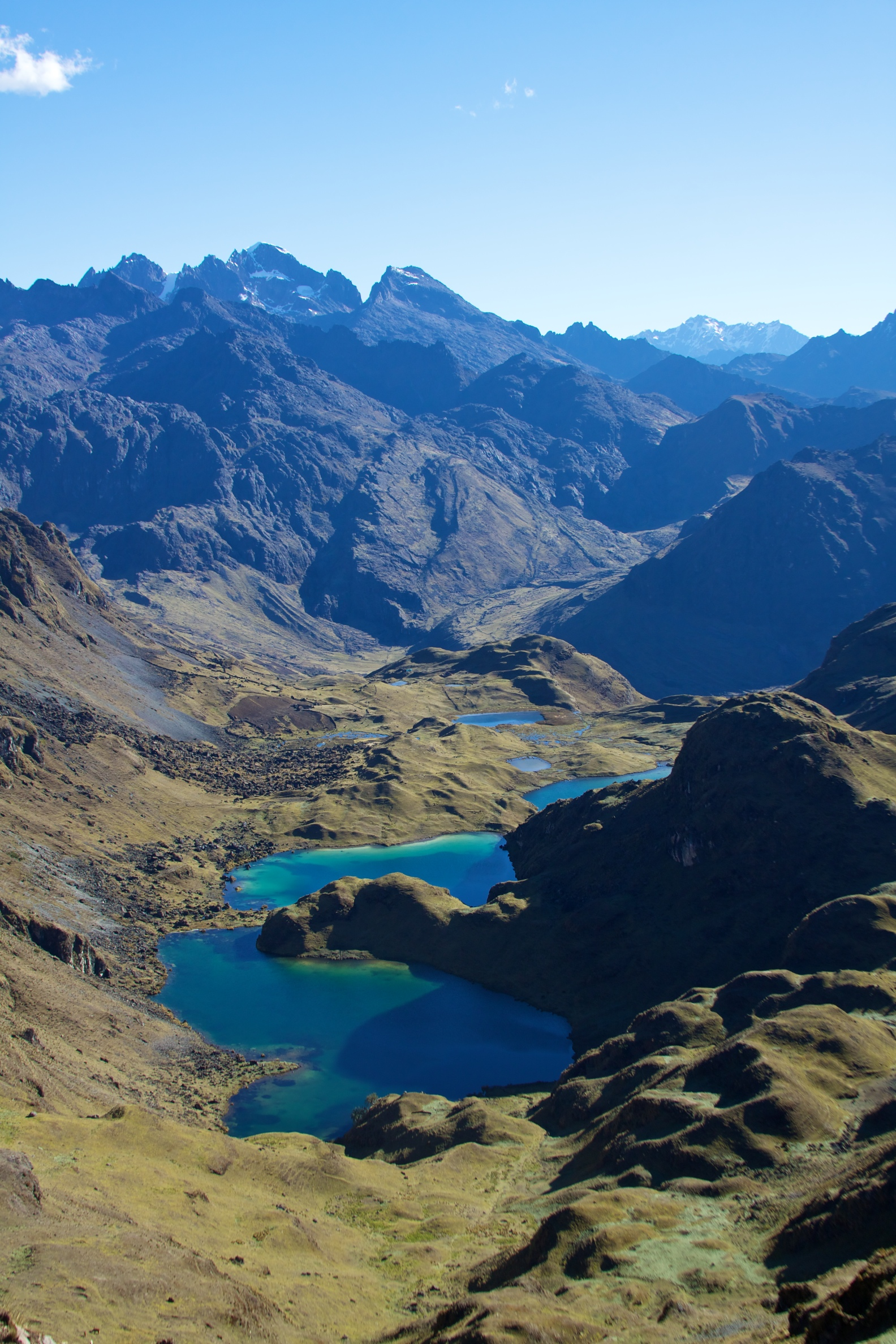
- Quellacocha as seen from the Willka Q'asa pass (looking to the west)

- Location within Peru
- Location: Peru; Cusco Region
- Coordinates: 13°09′29″S 72°03′47″W
- Surface elevation: 4,170 m (13,680 ft)

Quellacocha (possibly from Quechua killa moon, month, qucha lake, "moon lake") is a small lake in the Cusco Region in Peru. It is situated in the Urubamba mountain range at a height of about 4,170 metres (13,680 ft). Quellacocha lies south west of the village Lares and north of the mountains Chicón and Sirihuani.
