= Taray =

Taray can refer to:

- Taray District in Peru
- Taray, Peru, the capital of Taray District
- Cemal Hüsnü Taray (1893–1975), Turkish politician who was Minister of National Education of Turkey
