= Canchacanchajasa =

Mountain in Peru

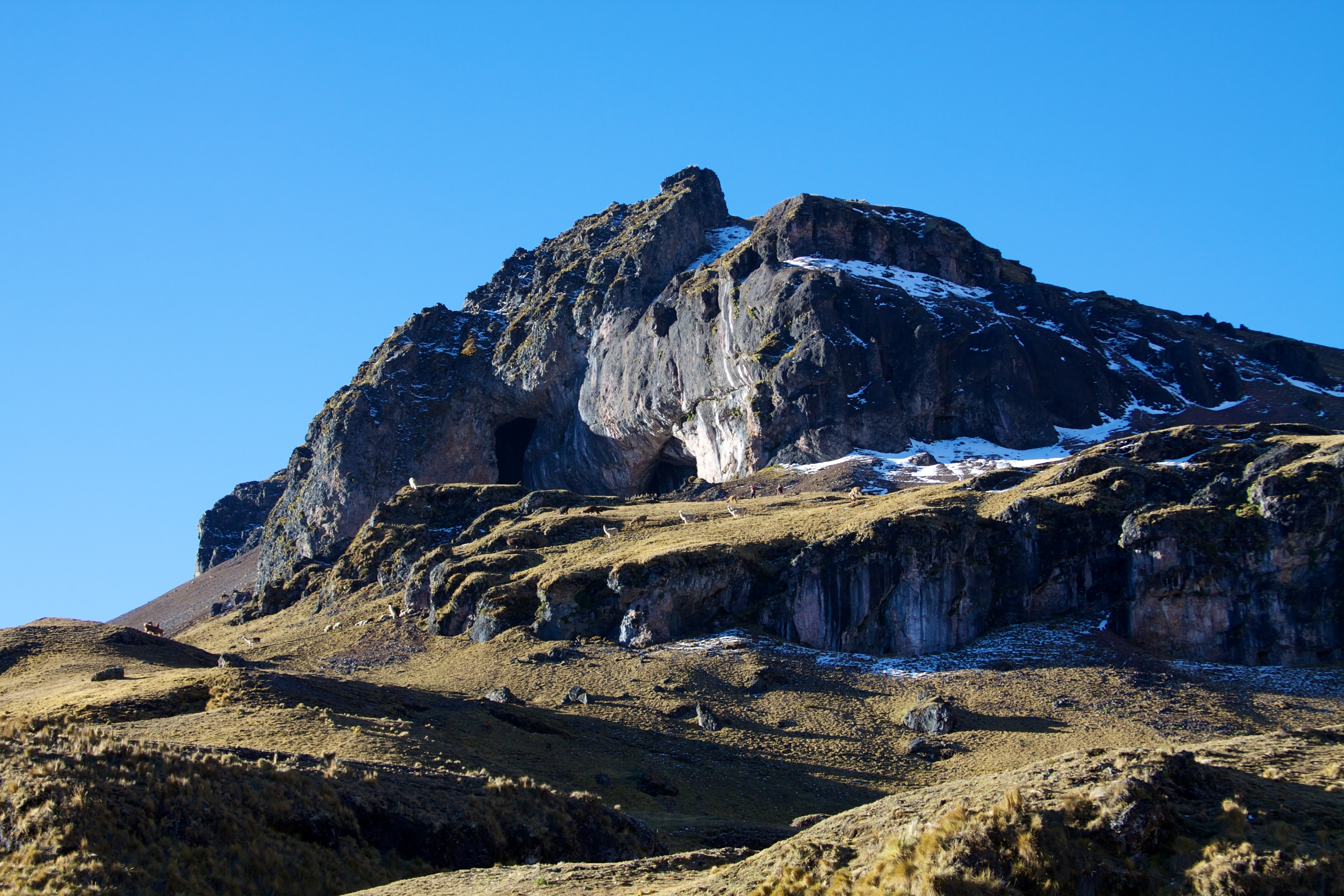
- Canchacanchajasa

Highest point
- Elevation: 4,987 m (16,362 ft)
- Coordinates: 13°13′12″S 72°0′32″W

Geography
- Location within Peru
- Location: Peru, Cusco Region
- Parent range: Urubamba mountain range

Canchacanchajasa (possibly from Quechua kancha enclosure, enclosed place, yard, a frame, or wall that encloses, q'asa mountain pass, the reduplication indicates that there is a group or a complex of something, "Cancha Cancha mountain pass") is a 4,987-metre-high (16,362 ft) mountain in the Urubamba mountain range in the Andes of Peru. It is located in the Cusco Region, Calca Province, Calca District, north of the Urubamba River. Canchacanchajasa is situated southeast of Sirihuani, north of Cóndorhuachana and Huamanchoque and southwest of Sahuasiray. It lies in the upper part of the Cancha Cancha valley (kancha kancha) at the Lares trek.

== See also ==
- Pucaorjo
