= Kimsaqucha (Pisac) =

Lake in Peru

- Quimsacocha, Kinsaqocha
- Location within Peru Location within South America
- Location: Peru; Cusco Region, Calca Province
- Coordinates: 13°20′55″S 71°49′42″W

Kimsaqucha or Quimsacocha (Quechua kimsa three, qucha lake, "three lakes", hispanicized spellings Kinsa Qocha, Quimsacocha) is a group of lakes in Peru located in the Cusco Region, Calca Province, Pisac District. The lakes lie in the north of the district, northeast of Pisac, in the community of Paru Paru.

== See also ==
- Chawaytiri
