= Pucaorjo (Calca) =

Mountain in Peru

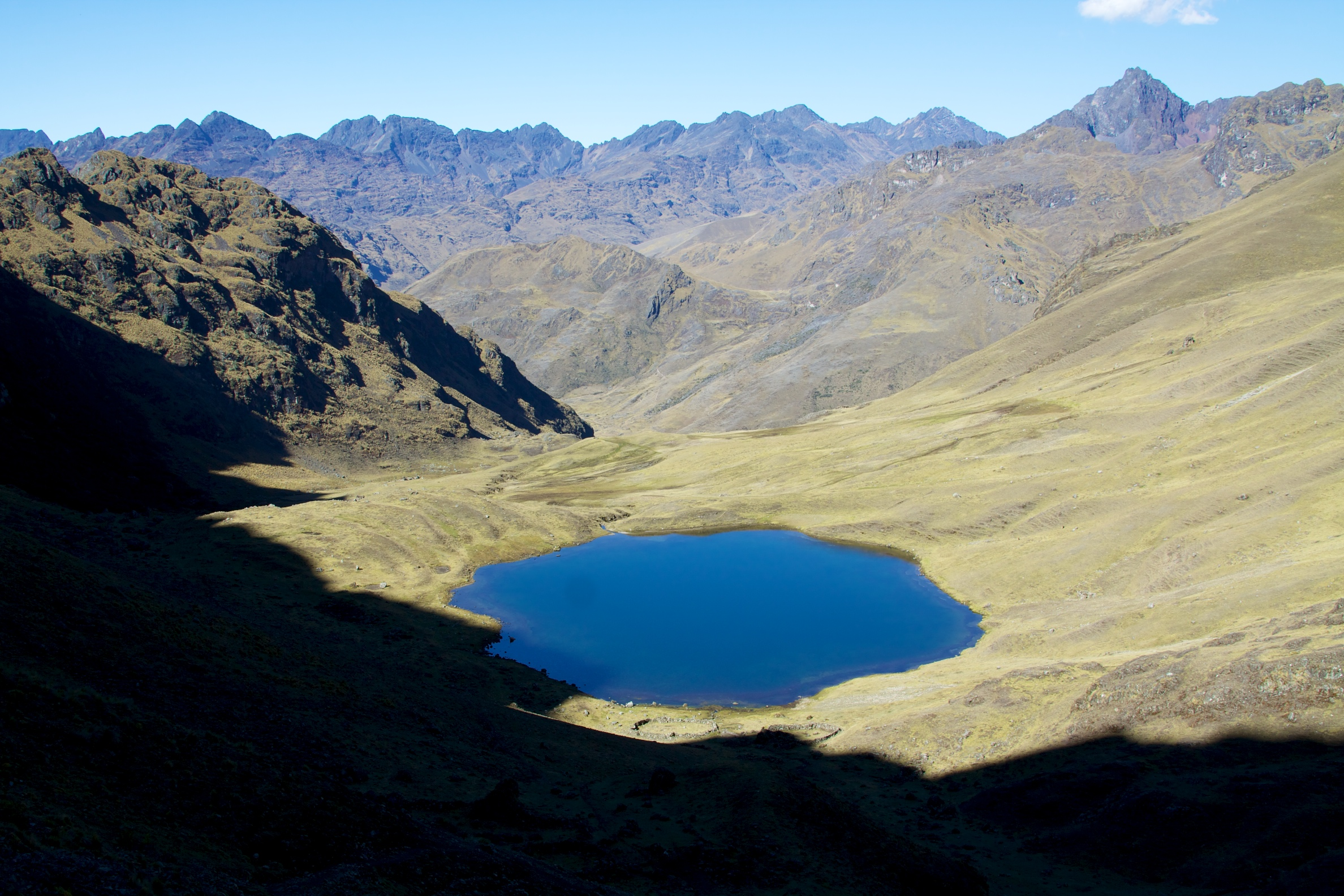
- Pucaorjo (on the right) as seen from Queuñacocha

Highest point
- Elevation: 4,776 m (15,669 ft)
- Coordinates: 13°10′29″S 72°01′13″W

Geography
- Location within Peru
- Location: Peru
- Parent range: Andes, Urubamba

Pucaorjo (possibly from Quechua puka red, urqu mountain, "red mountain") is a 4,776-metre-high (15,669 ft) mountain in the Urubamba mountain range in the Andes of Peru. It is situated in the Cusco Region, Calca Province, Lares District. Pucaorjo is situated northeast of Sirihuani, northwest of Sahuasiray and east of Parorjo, at the Lares trek. One of the nearest populated places is Quishuarani.

== See also ==
- Queuñacocha
