= Lake Challhuacocha (Cusco) =

Lake in Peru

Challhuacocha
- Location within Peru
- Location: Peru; Cusco Region, Calca Province
- Coordinates: 13°22′16.77″S 71°51′10.48″W
- Surface area: 1 ha (2.5 acres)
- Average depth: 5 m (16 ft)

Challhuacocha (possibly from Quechua challwa fish, qucha lake, "fish lake") is a lake in the Cusco Region in Peru. It is situated in the Calca Province, Pisac District.
