= Yanatile District =

Coordinates: 12.6818°S 72.2820°W

Yanatile
- District
- Flag
- Interactive map of Yanatile
- Country: Peru
- Region: Cusco
- Province: Calca
- Founded: May 18, 1982
- Capital: Quebrada Honda

Government
  - Mayor: Dimas Coronado Parra

Area
  - Total: 3,080.47 km^{2} (1,189.38 sq mi)
- Elevation: 1,124 m (3,688 ft)

Population (2005 census)
  - Total: 9,520
  - Density: 3.09/km^{2} (8.00/sq mi)
- Time zone: UTC-5 (PET)
- UBIGEO: 080408

Yanatile District is one of eight districts of the province Calca in Peru.

== Ethnic groups ==
The people in the district are mainly indigenous citizens of Quechua descent. Quechua is the language which the majority of the population (69.84%) learnt to speak in childhood, 28.33% of the residents started speaking using the Spanish language (2007 Peru Census).

== Climate ==
Climate data for Quebbrada Yanatile, elevation 1,183 m (3,881 ft), (1991–2020)
Month	Jan	Feb	Mar	Apr	May	Jun	Jul	Aug	Sep	Oct	Nov	Dec	Year
Mean daily maximum °C (°F)	28.9 (84.0)	28.8 (83.8)	29.1 (84.4)	29.0 (84.2)	29.2 (84.6)	29.3 (84.7)	29.6 (85.3)	30.8 (87.4)	31.2 (88.2)	30.8 (87.4)	30.4 (86.7)	28.9 (84.0)	29.7 (85.4)
Mean daily minimum °C (°F)	18.5 (65.3)	18.5 (65.3)	18.5 (65.3)	18.0 (64.4)	17.3 (63.1)	16.2 (61.2)	15.4 (59.7)	16.3 (61.3)	17.1 (62.8)	17.9 (64.2)	18.6 (65.5)	18.6 (65.5)	17.6 (63.6)
Average precipitation mm (inches)	220.3 (8.67)	222.7 (8.77)	187.5 (7.38)	104.4 (4.11)	53.1 (2.09)	25.2 (0.99)	29.4 (1.16)	34.4 (1.35)	45.9 (1.81)	154.8 (6.09)	114.1 (4.49)	188.4 (7.42)	1,380.2 (54.33)
Source: National Meteorology and Hydrology Service of Peru
