= Calca, Peru =

Calca
- Town
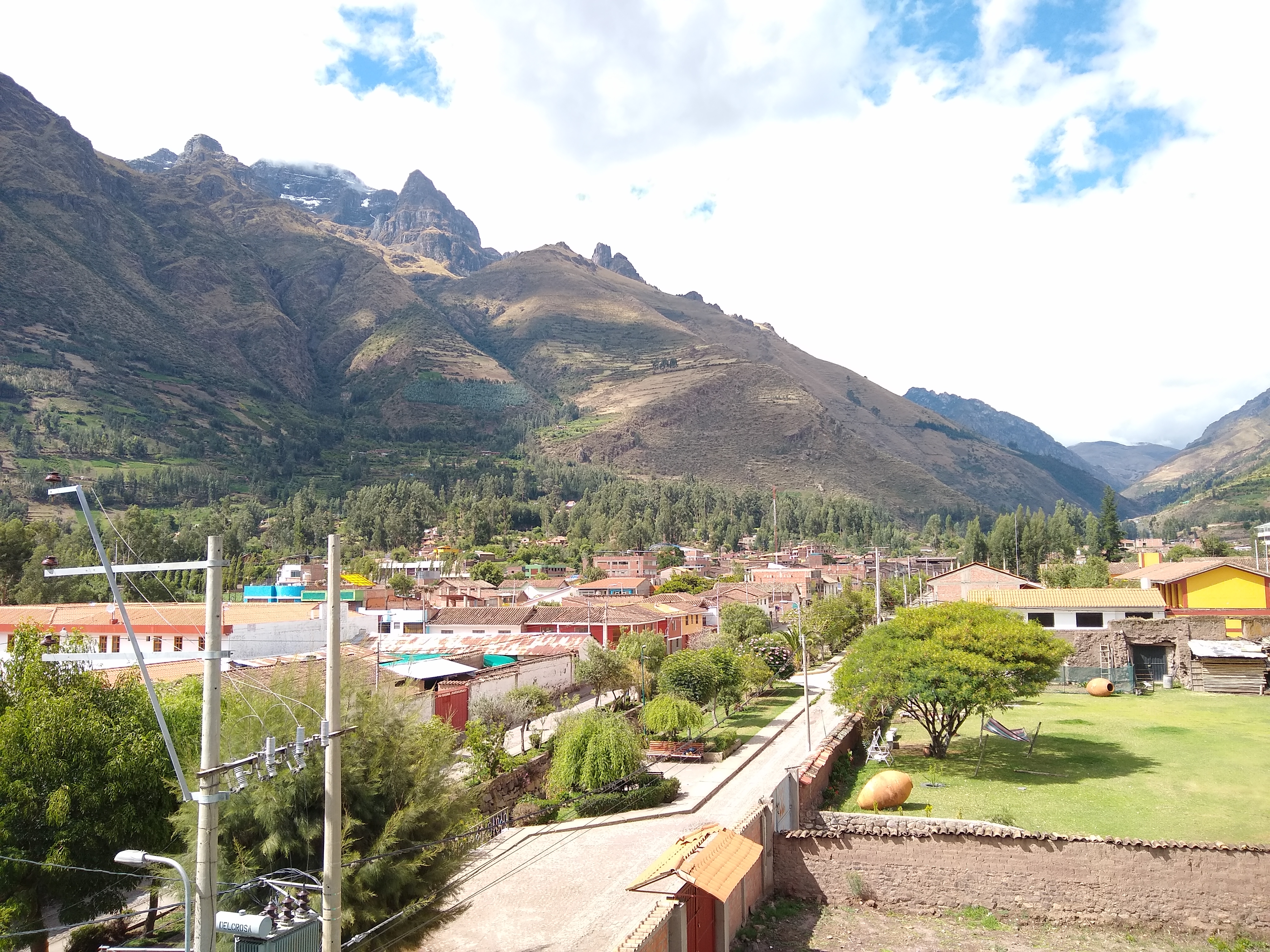
- Calca Avenue

- Location within Peru
- Coordinates: 13.323°S 71.956°W
- Country: Peru
- Region: Cusco
- Province: Calca
- District: Calca
- Elevation: 2,926 m (9,600 ft)

Population (2005)
  - Total: 9 732
- Time zone: UTC-5 (PET)

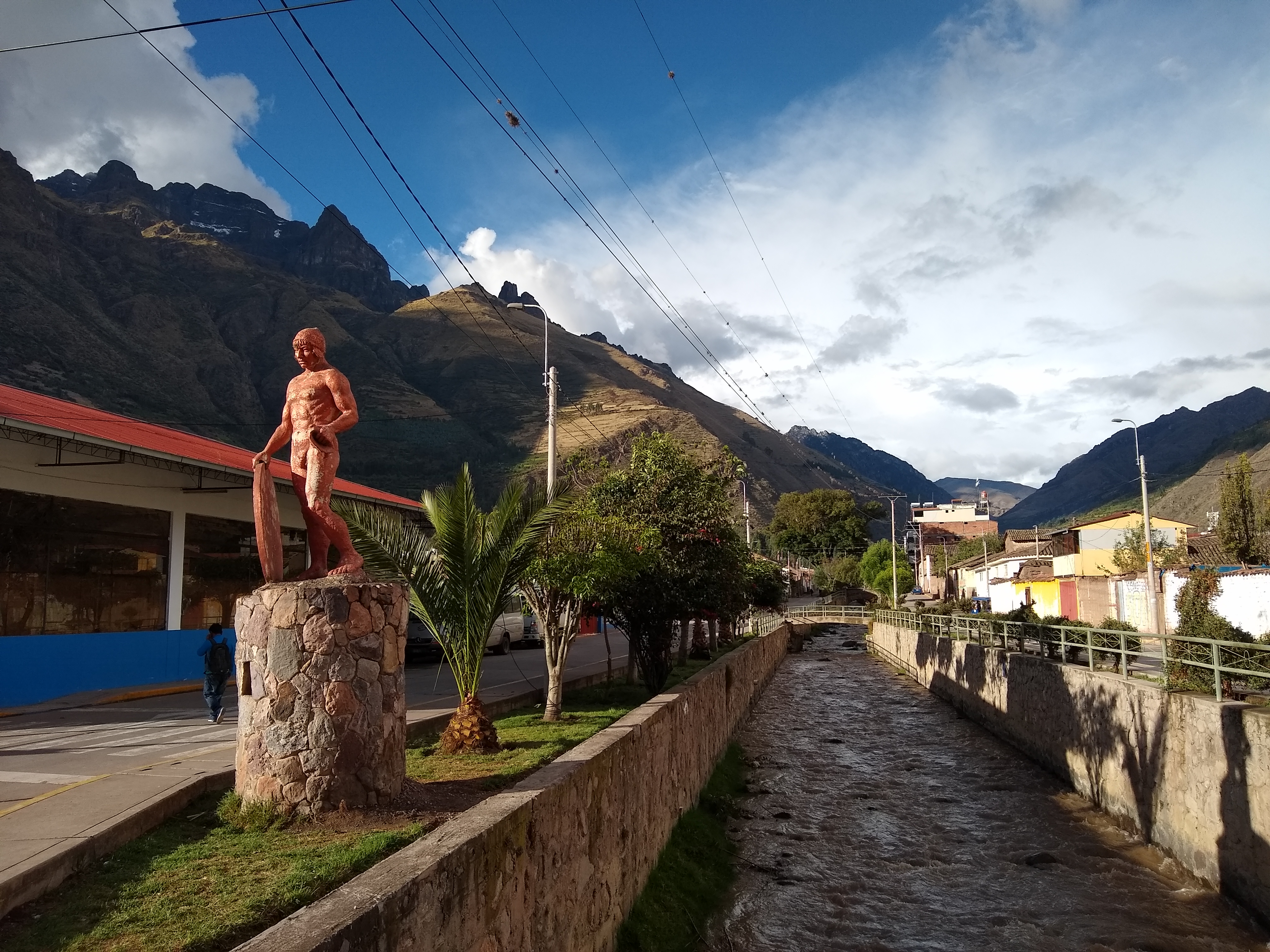
The town of Calca and old canal

Calca, also referred to as Villa de Zamora, is a town in southern Peru, capital of Calca Province in Cusco Region. It is at an elevation of around 2926 meters (9600 feet) above sea level.

== Climate ==
Climate data for Calca, elevation 2,926 m (9,600 ft), (1963–1998)
Month	Jan	Feb	Mar	Apr	May	Jun	Jul	Aug	Sep	Oct	Nov	Dec	Year
Mean daily maximum °C (°F)	21.5 (70.7)	21.8 (71.2)	21.8 (71.2)	22.5 (72.5)	22.6 (72.7)	22.2 (72.0)	22.3 (72.1)	22.6 (72.7)	23.0 (73.4)	23.4 (74.1)	23.2 (73.8)	22.3 (72.1)	22.4 (72.4)
Daily mean °C (°F)	14.6 (58.3)	14.7 (58.5)	14.7 (58.5)	14.1 (57.4)	13.1 (55.6)	11.9 (53.4)	11.6 (52.9)	12.7 (54.9)	14.1 (57.4)	15.0 (59.0)	15.5 (59.9)	15.0 (59.0)	13.9 (57.1)
Mean daily minimum °C (°F)	7.8 (46.0)	7.6 (45.7)	7.4 (45.3)	5.7 (42.3)	3.4 (38.1)	1.3 (34.3)	0.9 (33.6)	2.7 (36.9)	5.0 (41.0)	6.6 (43.9)	7.7 (45.9)	7.7 (45.9)	5.3 (41.6)
Average precipitation mm (inches)	112.0 (4.41)	93.4 (3.68)	82.2 (3.24)	35.0 (1.38)	5.1 (0.20)	5.2 (0.20)	3.1 (0.12)	7.7 (0.30)	13.2 (0.52)	33.4 (1.31)	60.0 (2.36)	83.7 (3.30)	534 (21.02)
Average relative humidity (%)	72.4	72.8	72.1	69.9	65.8	63.2	61.7	61.7	61.9	62.4	64.1	68.5	66.4
Source: Repositorio Institucional Continental
