= Qhapaq Kancha =

Archaeological site in Peru

- Interactive map of Qhapaq Kancha
- Periods: Inca
- Location: Peru, Cusco Region, Espinar Province
- Region: Andes

Qhapaq Kancha (Quechua qhapaq noble, principal, mighty, kancha corral, "principal corral", hispanicized spelling Ccapac Cancha) is an archaeological site in Peru of the Inca period on top of a mountain of the same name. It is located in the Cusco Region, Calca Province, Coya District.
