= Llamayuq =

Archaeological site in Peru

- Location: Peru
- Region: Cusco Region, Calca Province

Site notes
- Height: 4,000 metres (13,123 ft)

Llamayuq (Quechua llama llama, -yuq a suffix, "the one with a llama (or llamas)", also spelled Llamayoq) is an archaeological site with tombs and rock paintings in Peru. It is situated in the Cusco Region, Calca Province, Calca District. The site lies at a height of about 4,000 metres (13,123 ft) on the slope of Llamayuq Q'asa, also known as Qucha Quyllur (Quechua for "lake star"), in a valley called Wakan Wayq'u (Waqhanhuayq’o).
