= Pisac District =

Coordinates: 13.4217°S 71.8514°W

Pisac P'isaq
- District
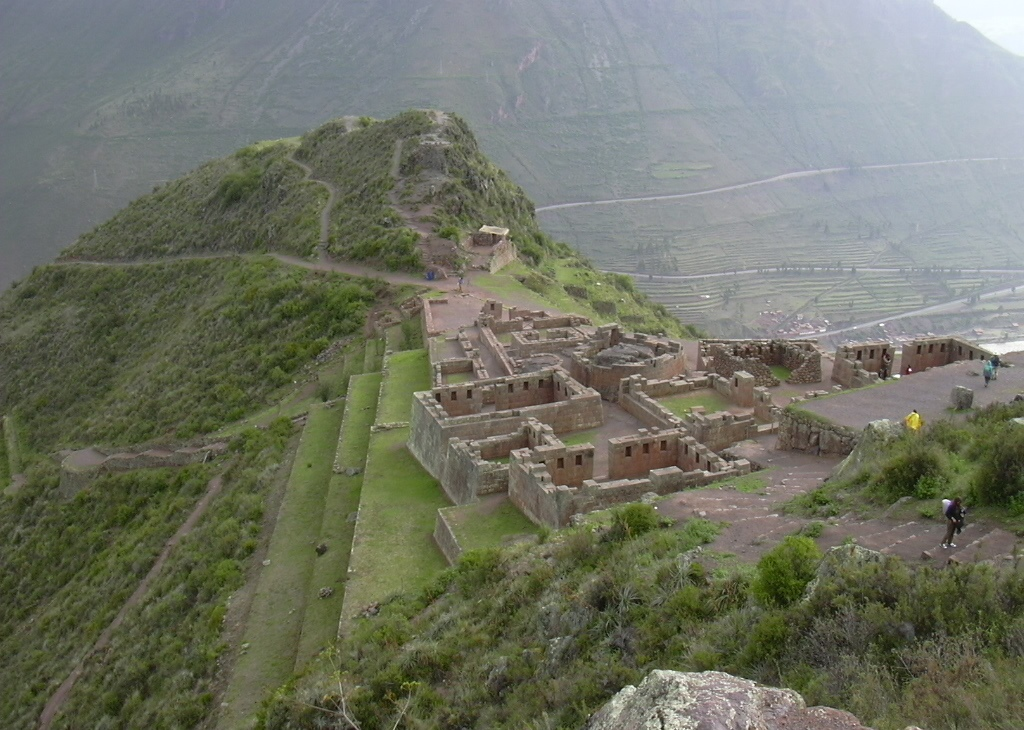
- Pisac
- Interactive map of Pisac
- Country: Peru
- Region: Cusco
- Province: Calca
- Capital: Pisac

Government
  - Mayor: Gavino Yucra Tunqui

Area
  - Total: 148.25 km^{2} (57.24 sq mi)
- Elevation: 2,972 m (9,751 ft)

Population (2005 census)
  - Total: 9,239
  - Density: 62.32/km^{2} (161.4/sq mi)
- Time zone: UTC-5 (PET)
- UBIGEO: 080405

Pisac District is one of eight districts of the province Calca in Peru.

== Geography ==
Some of the highest mountains of the district are listed below:

- Hatun Wayllarani
- Ichhunayuq
- Machu Kuntur Sinqa
- Ñustapata
- Pukayuq
- Q'ispi Urqu

== Ethnic groups ==
The people in the district are mainly indigenous citizens of Quechua descent. Quechua is the language which the majority of the population (72.23%) learnt to speak in childhood, 27.15% of the residents started speaking using the Spanish language (2007 Peru Census).

== Climate ==
Climate data for Pisac, elevation 2,990 m (9,810 ft), (1991–2020)
Month	Jan	Feb	Mar	Apr	May	Jun	Jul	Aug	Sep	Oct	Nov	Dec	Year
Mean daily maximum °C (°F)	21.8 (71.2)	21.5 (70.7)	22.0 (71.6)	22.7 (72.9)	23.4 (74.1)	23.2 (73.8)	23.0 (73.4)	23.4 (74.1)	23.6 (74.5)	23.7 (74.7)	24.3 (75.7)	22.7 (72.9)	22.9 (73.3)
Mean daily minimum °C (°F)	10.1 (50.2)	10.0 (50.0)	9.7 (49.5)	8.2 (46.8)	6.1 (43.0)	4.6 (40.3)	4.2 (39.6)	5.3 (41.5)	7.5 (45.5)	9.2 (48.6)	9.8 (49.6)	10.0 (50.0)	7.9 (46.2)
Average precipitation mm (inches)	119.1 (4.69)	99.8 (3.93)	83.2 (3.28)	26.4 (1.04)	7.0 (0.28)	4.6 (0.18)	5.6 (0.22)	6.3 (0.25)	11.2 (0.44)	39.7 (1.56)	56.7 (2.23)	99.3 (3.91)	558.9 (22.01)
Source: National Meteorology and Hydrology Service of Peru

== See also ==
- Challwaqucha
- Chawaytiri
- Inti Watana
- Kimsaqucha
- Willka Raymi
