= Mawk'ataray =

Archaeological site in Peru

- Cultures: Inca
- Location: Peru, Cusco Region, Calca Province
- Region: Andes

Mawk'ataray or Mawk'a Taray (Quechua mawk'a ancient, Taray a town, "old Taray", Hispanicized spelling Maukataray) is an archaeological site in Peru. It is located in the Cusco Region, Calca Province, Taray District.

== See also ==
- Pillku Urqu
