= Coya District =

Coordinates: 13.3875°S 71.8999°W

Coya
- District
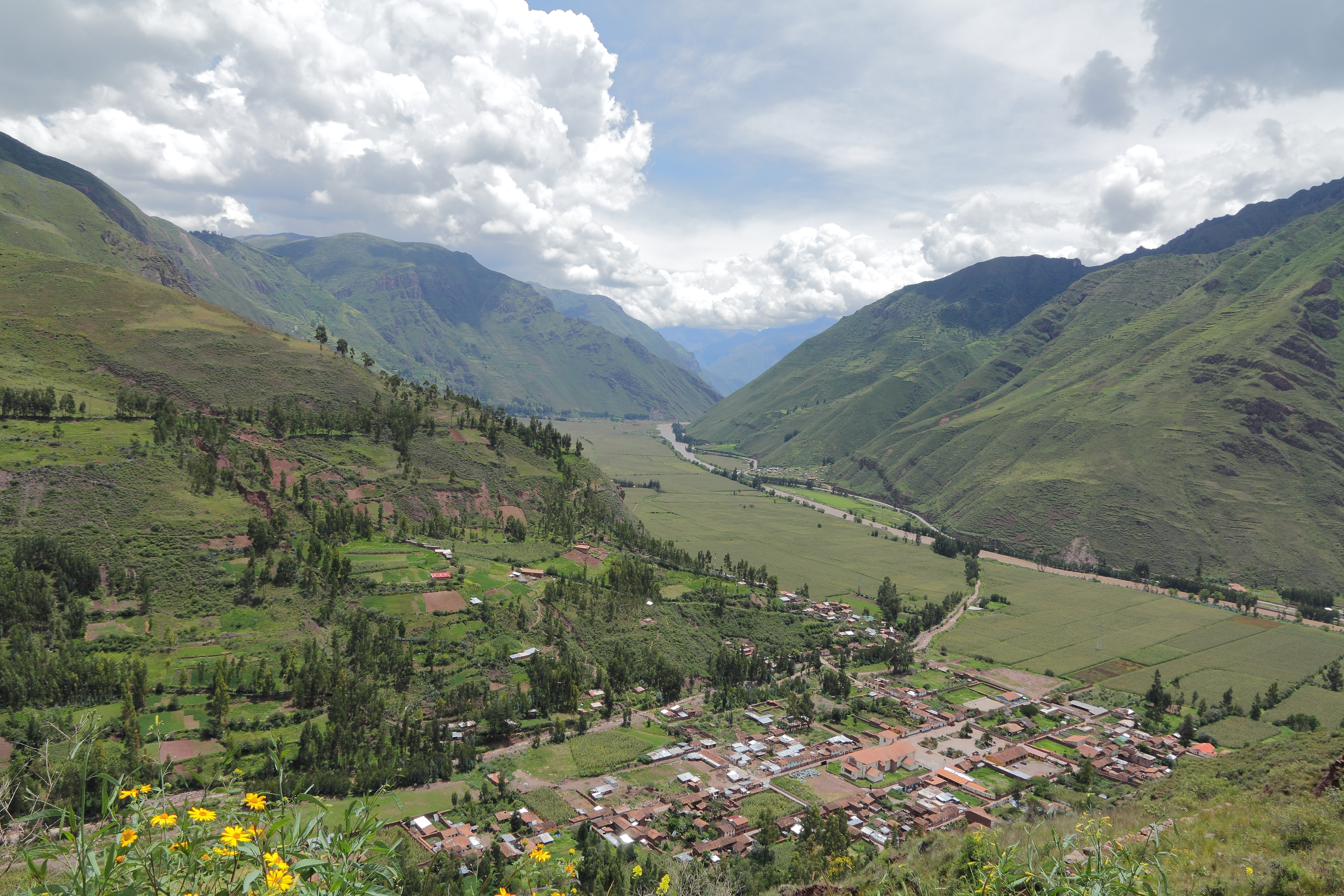
- The Willkanuta valley in the Coya District (background) as seen from Taray
- Interactive map of Coya
- Country: Peru
- Region: Cusco
- Province: Calca
- Founded: September 11, 1951
- Capital: Coya

Government
  - Mayor: Lizardo Emilio Palomino Ricalde

Area
  - Total: 71.43 km^{2} (27.58 sq mi)
- Elevation: 2,951 m (9,682 ft)

Population (2005 census)
  - Total: 3,698
  - Density: 51.77/km^{2} (134.1/sq mi)
- Time zone: UTC-5 (PET)
- UBIGEO: 080402

Coya District is one of eight districts of the Calca Province in the Cusco Region of Peru.

== Geography ==
Some of the highest mountains of the district are listed below:

- Hatun Pukara
- Hatun Raqha Kay
- Hatun Suyu Q'asa
- Ichhunayuq
- Quriqucha Punta
- Quriqucha Qaqa
- Q'umir
- Sirkapata
- Wanakawri
- Yawar Wak'a

== Ethnic groups ==
The people in the district are mainly indigenous citizens of Quechua descent. Quechua is the language which the majority of the population (79.19%) learnt to speak in childhood, 20.66% of the residents started speaking using the Spanish language (2007 Peru Census).

== See also ==
- Qhapaq Kancha
- Quriqucha
