= Ñust'apata =

Mountain in Peru

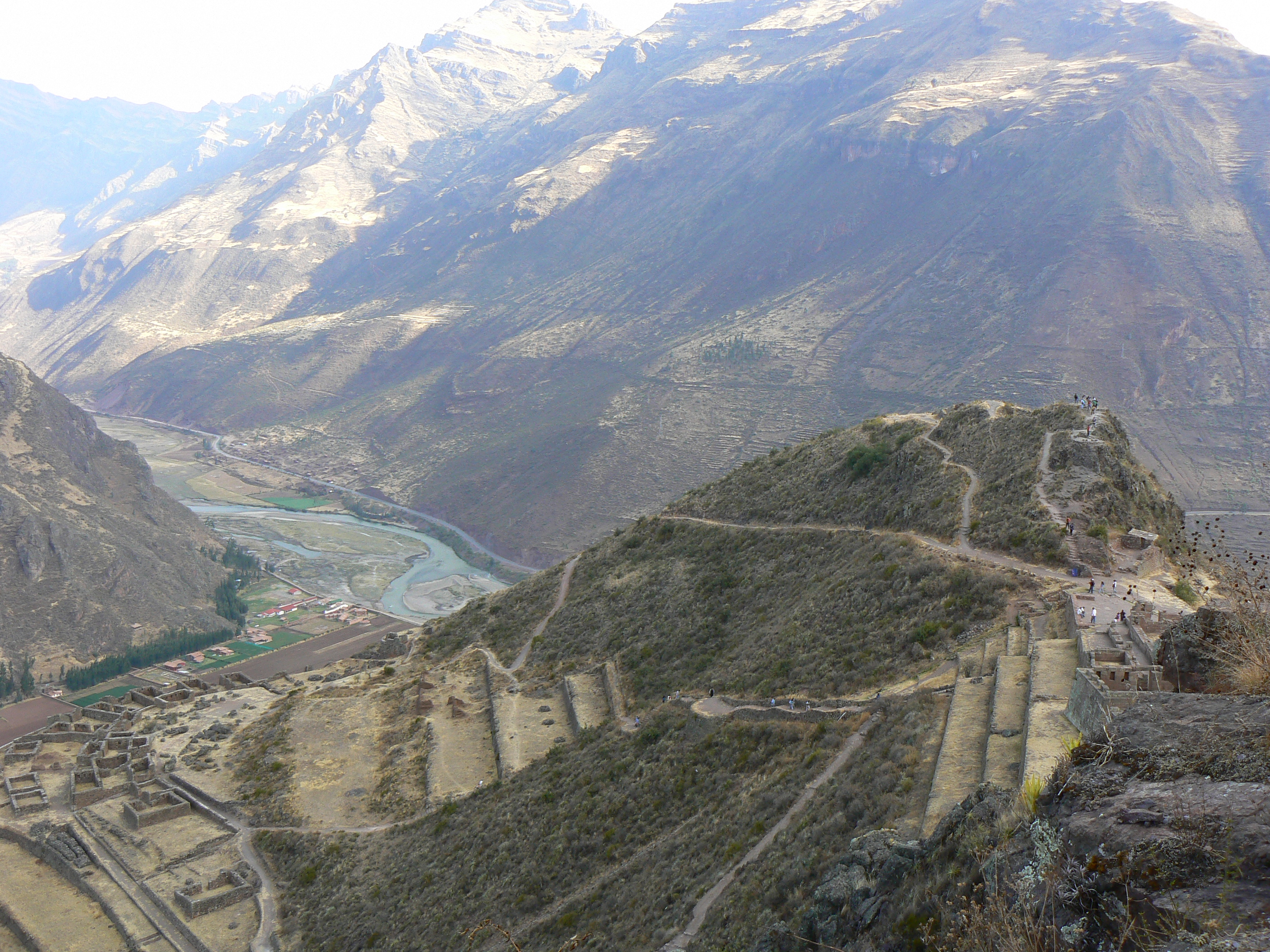
- View of the Sacred Valley and the Willkanuta River in Písac. Ñustapata is in the background on the right.

Highest point
- Elevation: 4,000 m (13,000 ft)
- Coordinates: 13°26′45″S 71°51′15″W

Naming
- Language of name: Quechua

Geography
- Location within Peru
- Location: Peru, Cusco Region
- Parent range: Andes

Ñust'apata (Quechua ñust'a princess, pata elevated place; above, at the top; edge, bank, shore, step) "princess bank") is a mountain in the Cusco Region in Peru, about 4,000 metres (13,123 ft) high. It is situated in the Calca Province, on the border of the districts of Pisac and Taray. Ñust'apata lies on the left bank of the Willkanuta River, near the archaeological park of Pisac.
