= Intiyuq K'uchu =

Archaeological site in Peru

- Pintasqa Wayq'u
- Interactive map of Intiyuq K'uchu
- Location: Peru
- Region: Cusco Region, Calca Province

Site notes
- Height: 3,800 metres (12,467 ft)

Intiyuq K'uchu (or Pintasqa Wayq'u) is an archaeological site in Peru with rock paintings. It is located in the Cusco Region, Calca Province, Lamay District. Intiyuq K'uchu is situated at a height of about 3,800 metres (12,467 ft).

Intiyuq K'uchu is a Quechuan name that means ""a corner with (a) sun". Inti means sun; -yuq is a suffix that denotes ownership; k'uchu means "corner". It is alternately spelled Intiyoqk'uchu.

Pintasqa Wayq'u (or Pintasqawayq'o) means "painted valley": Pintay ("to paint") is a borrowing from Spanish pintar; wayq'u/wayq'o means "valley".

Pintasqa Wayq'u (hispanicized as Pintashuayc) is also the name of the mountain at , at the right bank of the Willkanuta River.
