= Halancoma =

Mountain in Peru

- Location within Peru

Highest point
- Elevation: 5,367 m (17,608 ft)
- Coordinates: 13°11′09.5″S 72°15′13.4″W

Geography
- Location: Peru
- Parent range: Andes, Urubamba

Halancoma or Helancoma is a mountain in the Urubamba range in the Andes of Peru. Its peak is at 5,367 m (17,608 ft) m high. It is located above the town of Ollantaytambo in Urubamba Province, within the region of Cusco.
