= Calca province =

Coordinates: 13.319304°S 71.954656°W

Calca
- Province
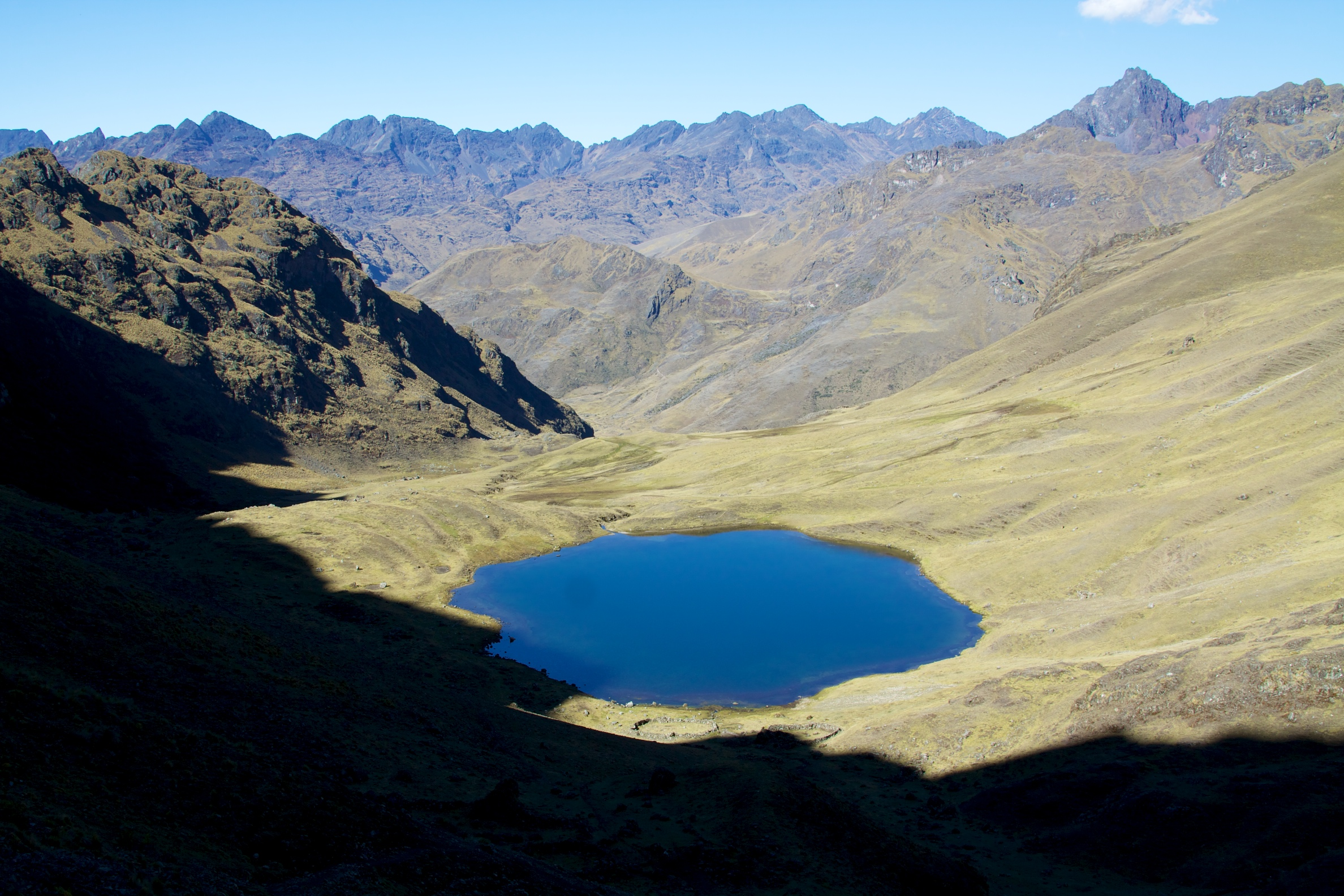
- Qiwñaqucha in the Calca Province

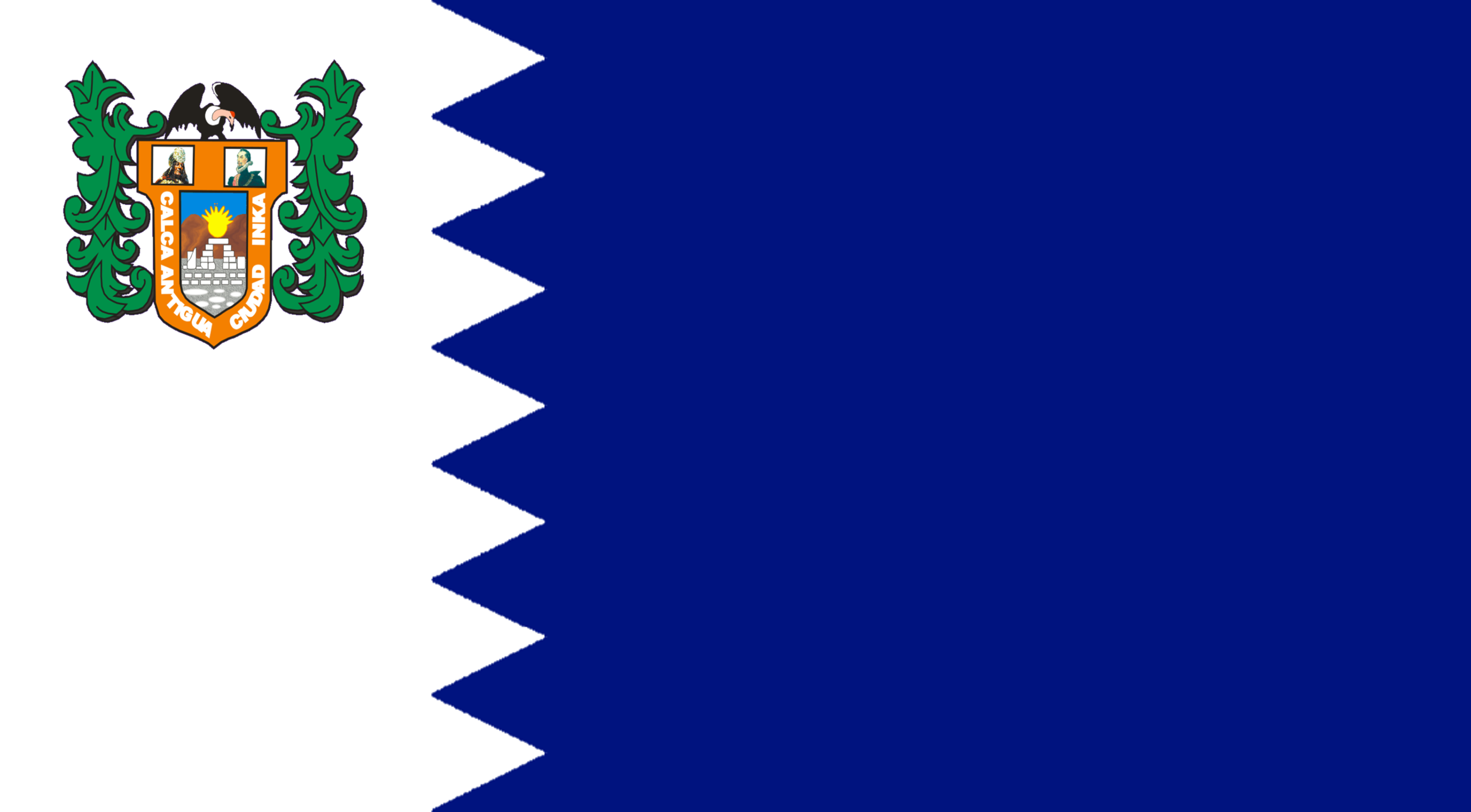
- Flag Coat of arms

- Location of Calca in the Cusco Region
- Country: Peru
- Region: Cusco
- Capital: Calca

Government
  - Mayor: Ciriaco Condori Cruz (2007)

Area
  - Total: 4,414.49 km^{2} (1,704.44 sq mi)

Population (2007 census)
  - Total: 65,407
  - Density: 14.816/km^{2} (38.374/sq mi)
- UBIGEO: 0804
- Website: www.municalca.gob.pe

Calca is one of thirteen provinces in the Cusco Region in the southern highlands of Peru. Its seat is Calca.

== Geography ==
The province is bounded to the north by the province of La Convención, to the east by the province of Paucartambo, to the south by the province of Cusco and the province of Quispicanchi, and to the west by the province of Urubamba.

It is traversed by the Urupampa mountain range. One of the highest peaks of the province is Sawasiray at 5,818 m (19,088 ft). Other mountains are listed below:

- Achupallayuq
- Anqasmarka
- Asul Urqu
- Aya Urqu
- Chawpi Urqu
- Chhullunkunayuq
- Ch'akiqucha
- Ch'iqun
- Hatun Parqu
- Hatun Pukara
- Hatun Punta
- Hatun Raqha Kay
- Hatun Suyu Q'asa
- Hatun Wayllarani
- Hatun Wisq'ana
- Huch'uy Raqha Kay
- Ichhunayuq
- Inti Qaqa
- Kancha Kancha Q'asa
- Kiswar Chaka
- Kiswarani
- Kunkani Punta
- Kuntur Qaqa
- Kuntur Wachana
- Llamayuq Q'asa
- Machu Kuntur Sinqa
- Maki Makiyuq
- Mullu Urqu
- Niwayuq
- Ñust'apata
- Pachakutiq
- Pachatusan
- Paru Urqu
- Pata Q'asa
- Pillku Urqu
- Pintas Wayq'u
- Pitusiray
- Puka Q'asa
- Puka Urqu
- Pukaqucha
- Pukaqucha (Lares)
- Pukayuq
- Pukyupata
- Puma Kallanka
- Puñayuq
- Phallchayuq
- Phuqchin
- P'unqu Q'asa
- P'unquchayuq
- Qullpa Qaqa
- Quri Wayrachina
- Quriqucha Punta
- Quriqucha Qaqa
- Qusqu Qhawarina
- Qusqu Qhawarina (Calca)
- Qhapaq Saya
- Qhiwar
- Q'irayuq
- Q'ispi Urqu
- Q'umir
- Rit'ipata
- Sallqayuq
- Sapan Sach'ayuq
- Saywayuq
- Silla Q'asa
- Siriwani
- Sirkapata
- Suntur
- Surayuq
- Surimpay
- Tawa Urqu
- Tawqa
- T'uturayuq
- Wallata Wachana
- Wallwa Qhata
- Wamanchuqi
- Wamantana
- Wanakawri
- Waypun
- Yana Chukchu
- Yana Qaqa
- Yana Urqu
- Yanaqucha
- Yawar Wak'a

The Willkanuta River which flows through the Sacred Valley is one of the most important rivers of the province.

== Political division ==
The province is divided into eight districts (Spanish: distritos, singular: distrito), each of which is headed by a mayor (alcalde). The districts, with their capitals in parentheses, are:

- Calca (Calca)
- Coya (Coya)
- Lamay (Lamay)
- Lares (Lares)
- Pisac (Pisac)
- San Salvador (San Salvador)
- Taray (Taray)
- Yanatile (Quebrada Honda)

== Ethnic groups ==
The people in the province are mainly indigenous citizens of Quechua descent. Quechua is the language which the majority of the population (69.92%) learnt to speak in childhood, 29.47% of the residents started speaking in Spanish.

== Archaeological sites ==
The archaeological complex of P'isaq including Inti Watana is one of the prominent sites with remains of the Inca period in the province. Other archaeological sites are Chawaytiri, Llamayuq, Qhapaq Kancha and Mawk'ataray.

== See also ==
- Challwaqucha
- Kimsaqucha (Lamay)
- Kimsaqucha (Pisac)
- Kuntur Wachana (film)
- Qiwñaqucha
- Quriqucha
- Sallqaqucha wallata warak'ay
- Saqra
- Willka Raymi
