= Pitusiray =

Mountain in Peru

- Location within Peru

Highest point
- Elevation: 4,991 m (16,375 ft)
- Coordinates: 13°16′31″S 71°59′13″W

Geography
- Location: Peru, Cusco Region
- Parent range: Andes, Urubamba

Pitusiray is a 4,991-metre-high (16,375 ft) mountain in the Urubamba mountain range in the Andes of Peru. It is located in the Cusco Region, Calca Province, Calca District, north of the Vilcanota River. Pitusiray is situated southeast of Huamanchoque and south of another mountain known as Ancasmarca, Pitusiray or Sallcasa which lies beyond the two valleys north of this mountain and northeast of Huamanchoque.
