= Quriqucha (Cusco) =

Lake in Cusco, Peru

- Location within Peru
- Location: PER Peru; Cusco Region
- Coordinates: 13°26′01″S 71°56′52″W
- Surface elevation: 4,020 m (13,190 ft)

Quriqucha (Quechua quri gold, qucha lake, "gold lake", hispanicized spelling Coricocha, Qoricocha) is a lake in Peru located in the Cusco Region, Calca Province, Coya District. It is situated at a height of about 4,020 metres (13,189 ft). Quriqucha lies west of the Willkanuta River and the little town Taray.
