= Hatun Pukara =

Mountain in Peru

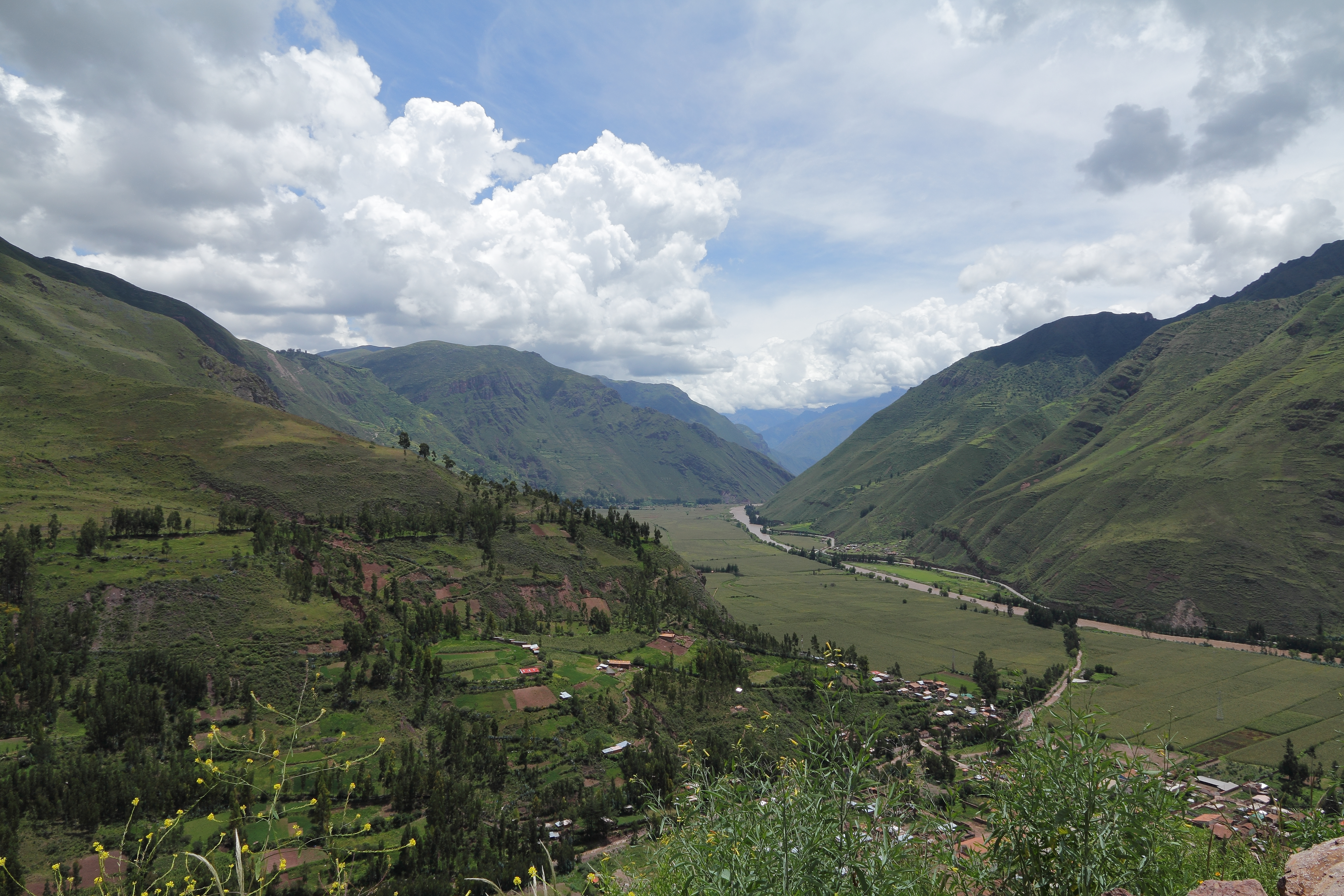
- The northern slope of Hatun Pukara (on the left), the village of Taray and the Willkanuta valley as seen from Ñustapata

Highest point
- Elevation: 4,000 m (13,000 ft)
- Coordinates: 13°26′23″S 71°53′18″W

Geography
- Location within Peru
- Location: Peru, Cusco Region
- Parent range: Andes

Hatun Pukara (Quechua hatun big, pukara fortress, "big fortress", hispanicized spelling Jatun Pucará) is a mountain in the Andes of Peru, about 4,000 metres (13,123 ft) high. It is located in the Cusco Region, Calca Province, on the border of the districts of Coya and Taray, southwest of Taray. It lies south of the Willkanuta River.
