= Coscojahuarina (Calca) =

Mountain in Peru

- Location within Peru

Highest point
- Elevation: 4,600 m (15,100 ft)
- Coordinates: 13°17′21″S 71°58′09″W

Geography
- Location: Peru
- Parent range: Andes, Urubamba

Coscojahuarina (possibly from Quechua qusqu boundary stone; nucleus; navel; heap of earth and stones; bed, dry bed of a lake, Qusqu Cusco (a city), qhawarina, qhawana viewpoint) is a mountain in the eastern extensions of the Urubamba mountain range in the Andes of Peru, about 4,600 m (15,100 ft) high. It is located in the Cusco Region, Calca Province, Calca District. It lies southeast of Huamanchoque and Pitusiray.
