= Coscojahuarina (Totora) =

Mountain in Peru

- Location within Peru

Highest point
- Elevation: 4,623 m (15,167 ft)
- Coordinates: 13°14′40″S 71°55′33″W

Geography
- Location: Peru
- Parent range: Andes, Urubamba

Coscojahuarina (possibly from Quechua qusqu boundary stone; nucleus; navel; heap of earth and stones; bed, dry bed of a lake, Qusqu Cusco (a city), qhawarina, qhawana viewpoint) is a 4,623-metre-high (15,167 ft) mountain in the eastern extensions of the Urubamba mountain range in the Andes of Peru. It is located in the Cusco Region, Calca Province, Calca District. It lies south of Llamayojcasa and west of the village of Totora.
