= Llamayojcasa =

Mountain in Peru

- Qochaqollur
- Location within Peru

Highest point
- Elevation: 4,600 m (15,100 ft)
- Coordinates: 13°13′52″S 71°55′22″W

Geography
- Location: Peru
- Parent range: Andes, Urubamba

Llamayojcasa (possibly from Quechua llama llama, -yuq a suffix, Llamayuq an archaeological site, q'asa mountain pass, "Llamayuq pass" or "mountain pass with llamas"), also known as Qochaqollur (possibly from Quechua for "lake star"), is a mountain in the eastern extensions of the Urubamba mountain range in the Andes of Peru, about 4,600 m (15,092 ft) high. It is located in the Cusco Region, Calca Province, Calca District. It lies southeast of Ccerayoc. This is where the archaeological site of Llamayuq is situated.
