= Sóndor (Cusco) =

Mountain in Peru

- Location within Peru

Highest point
- Elevation: 4,400 m (14,400 ft)
- Coordinates: 13°16′00″S 71°51′12″W

Naming
- Language of name: Quechua

Geography
- Location: Peru, Cusco Region, Calca Province
- Parent range: Andes

Sóndor (possibly from Quechua suntur: congress, meeting) is a mountain in the Cusco Region in Peru, about 4,400 metres (14,436 ft) high. It is situated in the Calca Province, on the border of the districts of Calca and Lamay. Sóndor lies southeast of a group of lakes. The largest of them is Pampacocha (possibly from Quechua for "plain lake"). South of the mountain there is an intermittent stream named Vilcabamba. It flows to the southwest as a right tributary of the Vilcanota River. The confluence is in Lamay.
