= Chawaytiri =

Archaeological site with rock paintings in Peru

- Interactive map of Chawaytiri
- 13°23′30″S 71°45′15″W
- Location: Peru
- Region: Cusco Region, Calca Province

Chawaytiri (Hispanicized Chahuaytire, Chahuaytiri) is an archaeological site with rock paintings in Peru. It is situated in the Cusco Region, Calca Province, Pisac District, near the village Chawaytiri. The principal section with paintings predominantly showing llamas is named Llamachayuq Qaqa (Quechua llama llama, -cha, -yuq suffixes, qaqa rock, "a rock with a little llama") or Chawaytiri. It lies on the slope of the mountain Muruwiksa (Moro-Wicsa, Morowiqsa, Morro Huicsa). The other sections are named Wamanwachana, Kawituyuq (Cahuituyoc), P'allqapata (Pallcapata), Musuqllaqta (Mosoqllaqta), Misaqaqa and Qaqa.
