= Huamanchoque =

Mountain in Peru

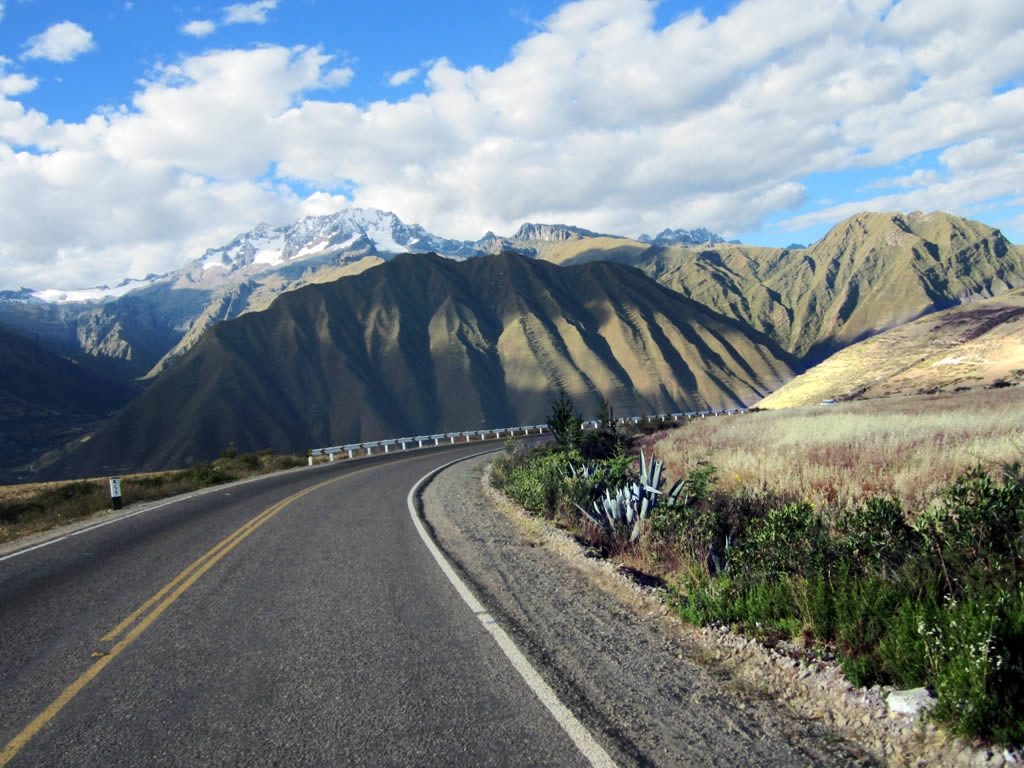
- The Urubamba mountain range as seen from the southwest. Chicón is on the left. Huamanchoque with Ancasmarca are visible on the right side in the background of this image.

Highest point
- Elevation: 5,156 m (16,916 ft)
- Coordinates: 13°15′25″S 72°00′42″W

Geography
- Location within Peru
- Location: Cusco, Peru
- Parent range: Andes, Urubamba

Huamanchoque (possibly from Quechua waman falcon or variable hawk, chuqi metal, every kind of precious metal / gold (<Aymara)) is a 5,156-metre-high (16,916 ft) mountain in the Urubamba mountain range in the Andes of Peru. It is located in the Cusco Region, Calca Province, Calca District, north of the Vilcanota River. Huamanchoque lies at the Cancha Cancha valley where the Lares trek route passes by. It is situated south of Canchacanchajasa, southwest of Sahuasiray and Cóndorhuachana, and north of a lower peak named Cóndorhuachana. One of the nearest towns is Huayllabamba.
