= Kuntur Wachana (film) =

- Directed by: Federico García
- Release date: 22 December 1977
- Running time: 87 minutes
- Country: Peru
- Languages: Quechua, Spanish

Kuntur Wachana (Quechua for 'where the condor is born') is a Peruvian docudrama directed by Federico García Hurtado (born in Cusco, 1937). It was released in 1977. Kuntur Wachana won the FIPRESCI international critics' prize at the 10th Moscow International Film Festival.

== Summary ==
Indigenous Peruvians led by Quechua peasant and trade union leader Saturnino Huillca struggle for land reform.

== See also ==
- Peru pre-land reform
