= Taray District =

Coordinates: 13.4283°S 71.8672°W

Taray
- District
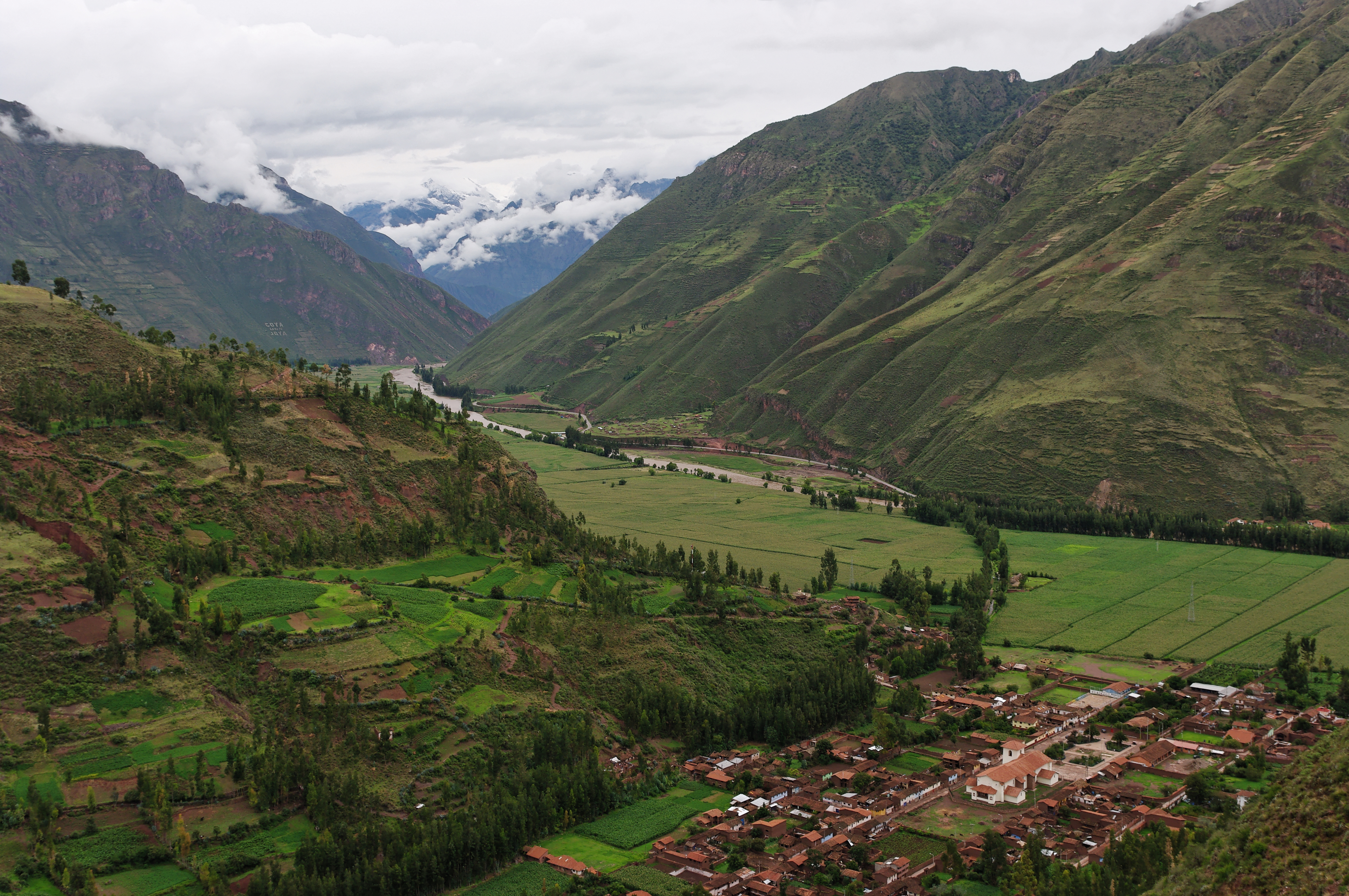
- Taray and the Willkanuta River
- Interactive map of Taray
- Country: Peru
- Region: Cusco
- Province: Calca
- Founded: May 6, 1964
- Capital: Taray

Government
  - Mayor: Gorki Bejar Mejia

Area
  - Total: 53.78 km^{2} (20.76 sq mi)
- Elevation: 2,968 m (9,738 ft)

Population (2005 census)
  - Total: 3,917
  - Density: 72.83/km^{2} (188.6/sq mi)
- Time zone: UTC-5 (PET)
- UBIGEO: 080407

Taray District is one of eight districts of the Calca Province in the Cusco Region in Peru. Its seat is Taray. The town lies near Pisac, southwest of it, at a stream called Pawayuq (Pahuayoc), an affluent of Willkanuta River.

== Geography ==
Some of the highest mountains of the district are listed below:

- Hatun Pukara
- Inti Qaqa
- Ñust'apata
- Pata Q'asa
- Pillku Urqu
- Silla Q'asa
- Wanakawri
- Yana Qaqa

== Ethnic groups ==
The people in the district are mainly indigenous citizens of Quechua descent. Quechua is the language which the majority of the population (86.14%) learnt to speak in childhood, 13.37% of the residents started speaking using the Spanish language (2007 Peru Census).

== See also ==
- Mawk'ataray
