= Polylepis pepei =

Conservation status
- Vulnerable (IUCN 2.3)

Scientific classification
- Kingdom: Plantae
- Clade: Tracheophytes
- Clade: Angiosperms
- Clade: Eudicots
- Clade: Rosids
- Order: Rosales
- Family: Rosaceae
- Genus: Polylepis
- Species: P. pepei

Binomial name
- Polylepis pepei B. Simpson

Species of tree

Polylepis pepei is a species of plant in the family Rosaceae. It is found in Bolivia and Peru. It is threatened by habitat loss.
