= Ccerayoc =

Mountain in Peru

- Location within Peru

Highest point
- Elevation: 5,092 m (16,706 ft)
- Coordinates: 13°12′41″S 71°57′16″W

Geography
- Location: Peru
- Parent range: Andes, Urubamba

Ccerayoc (possibly from Quechua q'ira a species of wild lupin, Lupinus platiphyllus) is a 5,092-metre-high (16,706 ft) mountain in the Urubamba mountain range in the Andes of Peru. It is located in the Cusco Region, Calca Province, in the districts Calca and Lares. It lies immediately east of Sahuasiray (Colque Cruz) and northeast of Condorhuachana.

== See also ==
- Lares trek
