= Sirihuani =

Mountain in Peru

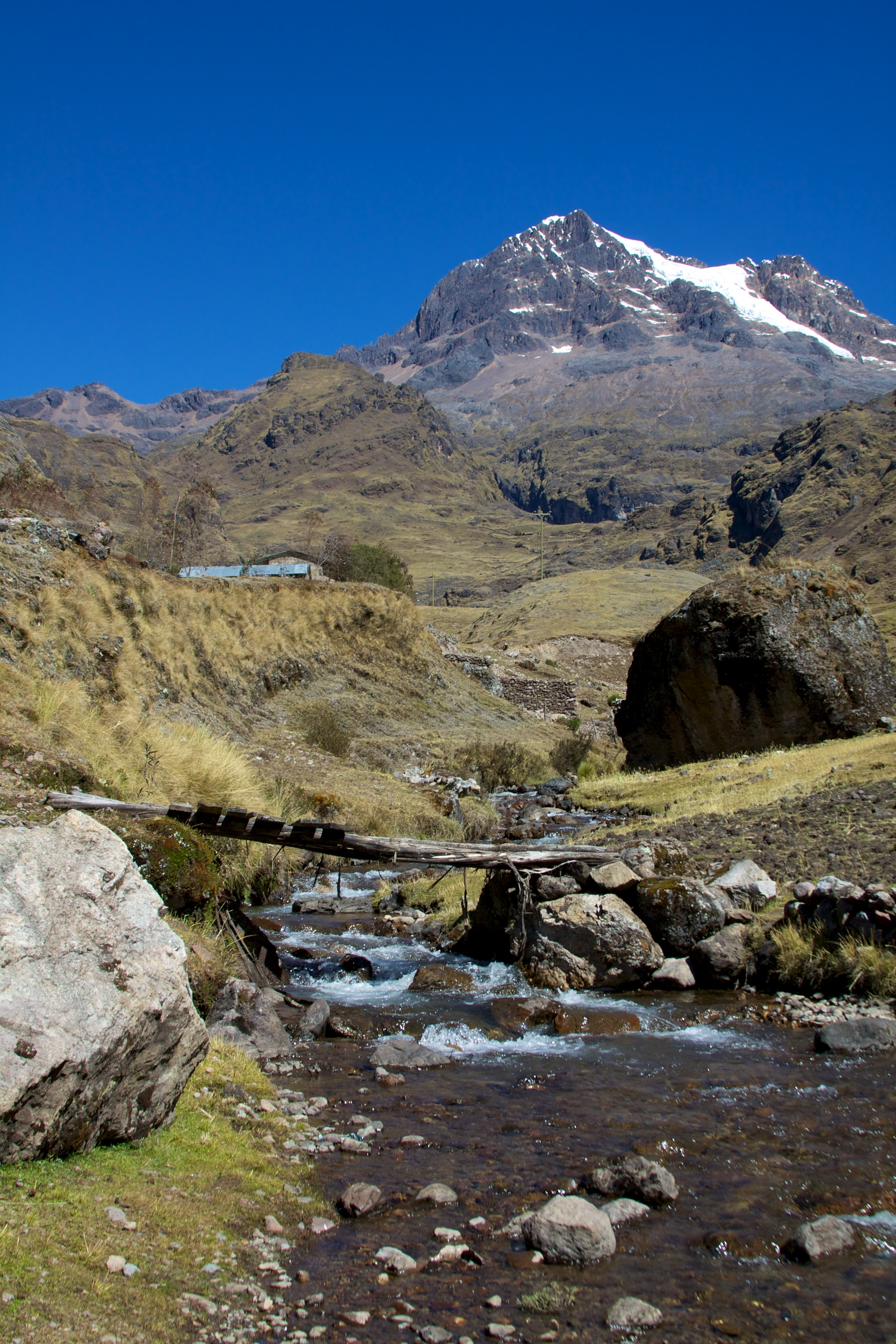
- Sirihuani as seen from the Lares trek.

Highest point
- Elevation: 5,359 m (17,582 ft)
- Coordinates: 13°11′57″S 72°02′39″W

Geography
- Location within Peru
- Location: Peru
- Parent range: Andes, Urubamba

Climbing
- First ascent: -1964 via S.E. face: N.E. ridge-1964: E. face, descend N. face-1976

Sirihuani or Sirijuani is a 5,359-metre-high (17,582 ft) mountain in the Urubamba mountain range in the Andes of Peru. It is located in the Cusco Region, Calca Province, in the districts of Calca and Lares. It is situated northwest of Sahuasiray and Canchacanchajasa mountains, and northeast of Chicón.
