= Lares trek =

High-altitude hike in Peru near Machu Picchu

Lares Trek
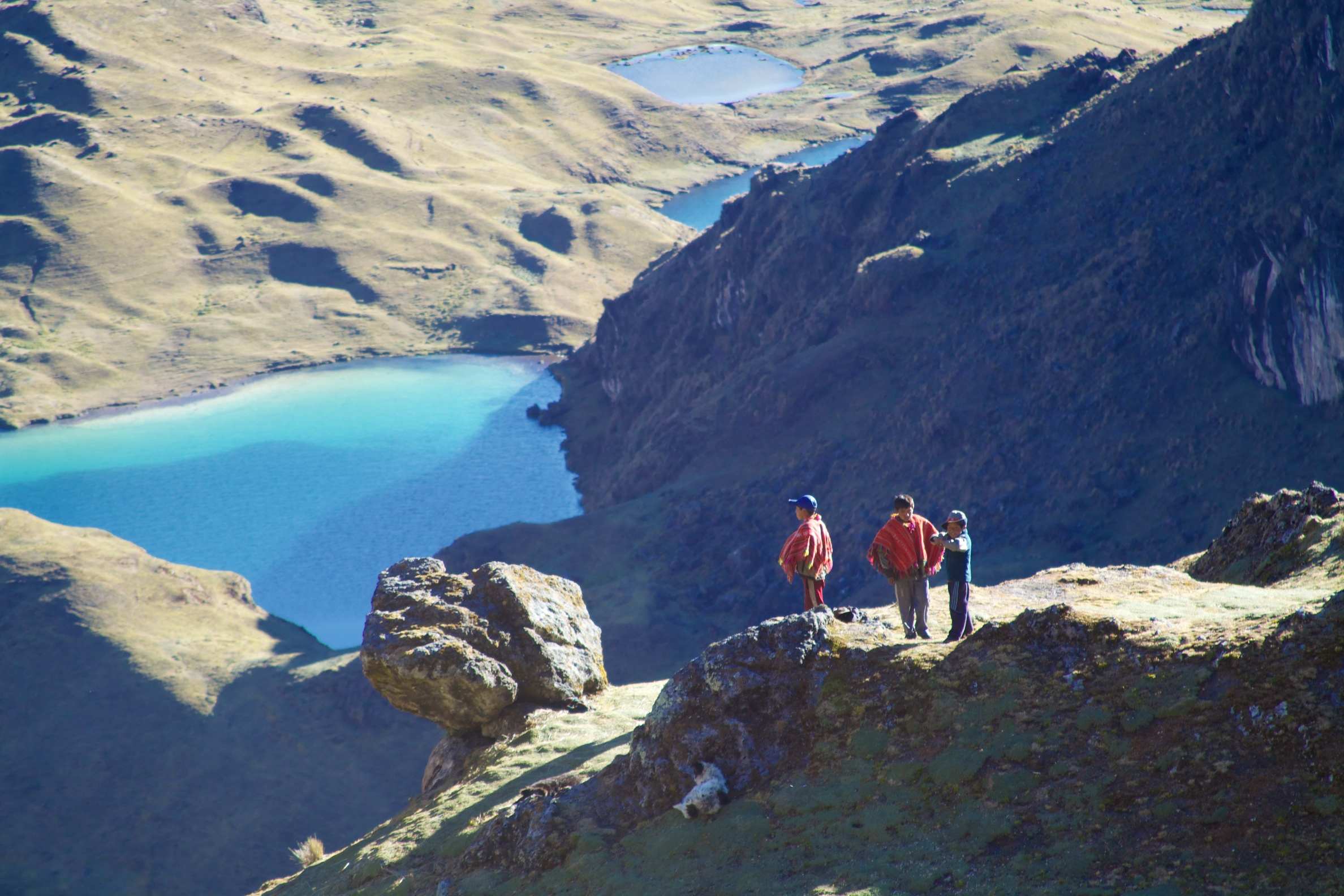
- Rural boys watching the herds along the Lares trek
- Length: 33 kilometres (21 mi)
- Location: Cusco, Peru
- Trailheads: Lares
- Use: Hiking

The Lares trek is a two- or three-day high-altitude hike in Cusco, Peru, starting near the village Lares, approximately 40 mi (64 km) north of Cusco and 35 mi (56 km) east of Machu Picchu. The Lares Valley lies in the east of the Urubamba mountain range, traversing part of the Sacred Valley. Reaching the start of the trek requires a bus or van trip of approximately five hours from the village of Lares. The trek route transverses typical Peruvian Andean mountain areas.

The Lares Valley is home of many traditional weavers and farmers and famous for homemade textiles. The indigenous people of this area speak Quechua and Spanish.

The Lares trek is one of the main alternatives to the Inca Trail to Machu Picchu. It is slightly shorter and higher in altitude than the Inca Trail; it is accessible from Cusco. Unlike the Inca Trail, permits are not required to hike the Lares trek.

There are a number of different route itineraries and variations available on the Lares trek. It is far quieter than the Inca Trail, as it is not as well known. While slightly easier than the Inca Trail based on terrain, the increased altitude can be more physically challenging as there are three high passes to cross, the highest being 4,400 m (14,400 ft).

== The classic route ==
The standard Lares trek route is the shortest (33 km [21 mi]) and easiest route, and only crosses one high pass. The route usually takes three days to trek.

Trekkers depart Cusco (3,400 m [11,200 ft]) early on the first day, often around 6am, and drive for several hours to Calca, a small town at 2,928 m (9,606 ft) altitude. From Calca, trekkers are driven a further three hours north until they arrive at Lares. The hot springs in Lares are popular. From Lares the trek is five hours to the first night's camping spot at Huacahuasi (3,750 m [12,300 ft]).

Huacahuasi is a traditional weaving village and trekkers often try their hand at weaving here. The second day of trekking is the shortest and steepest as one crosses over the Ipsaycocha Pass (4,450 m [14,600 ft]), the highest point on the trail. One may camp beside Ipsaycocha Lake.

The final day of trekking is all downhill, passing through several traditional weaving villages. including Patacancha (3,700 m [12,100 ft]) and Huilloc, before finishing at Ollantaytambo (2,792 m [9,160 ft]). The treck finishes at a train station with trains available to Aguas Calientes and Cusco.

There are several additional routes in the area, including some where trekkers can stay with local families instead of camping.
