= Sahuasiray =

Mountain in Peru

- Ccolque Cruz
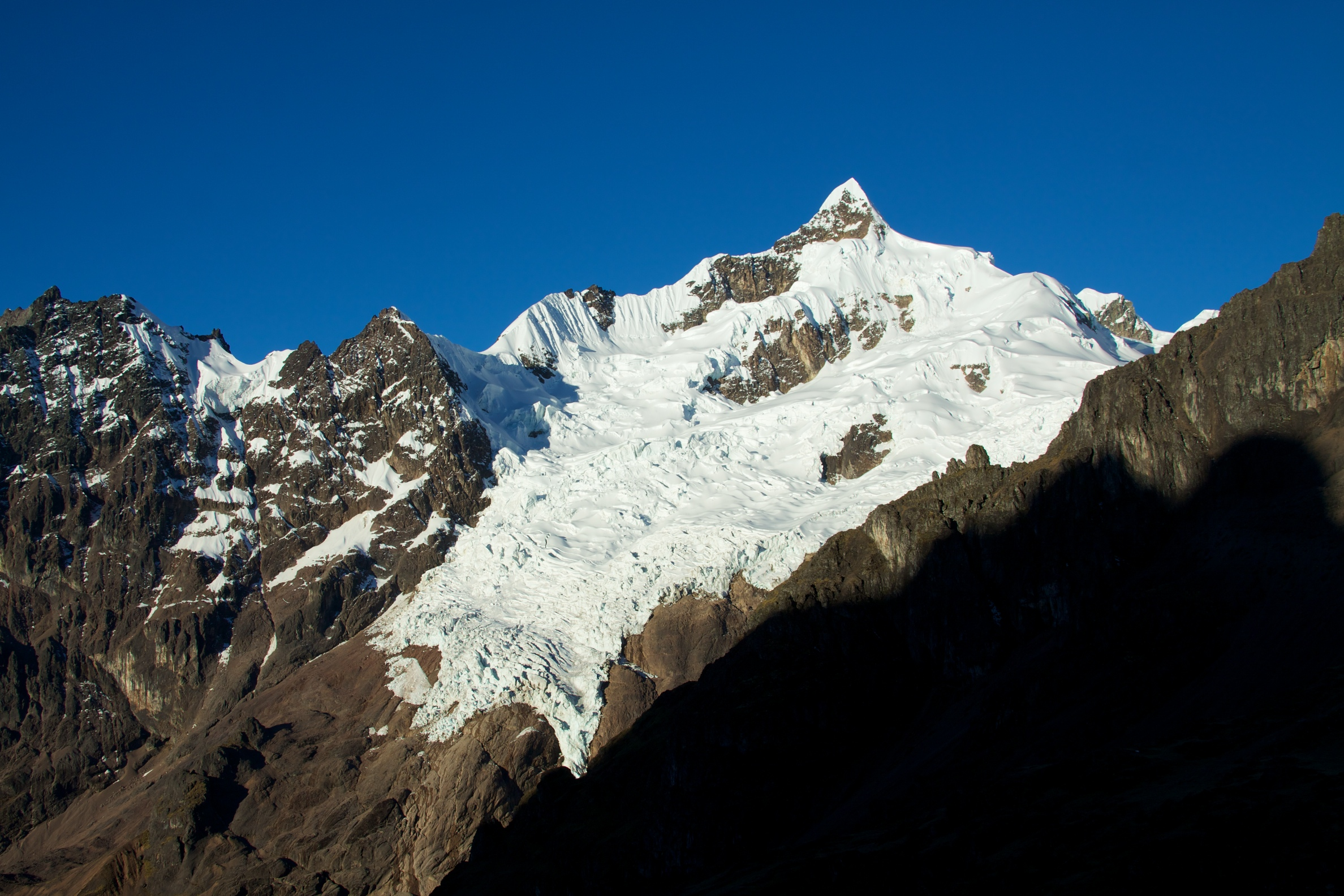
- The snow-covered Sahuasiray.

Highest point
- Elevation: 5,818 m (19,088 ft)
- Prominence: 1,920 m (6,300 ft)
- Listing: Ultra
- Coordinates: 13°12′50″S 71°59′18″W

Geography
- Location within Peru
- Location: Cusco, Peru
- Parent range: Urubamba, Andes

Climbing
- First ascent: Sahuasiray N: 1-1963 via E. ridge. Sahuasiray S: 1-1968

Sahuasiray (possibly from Quechua sawa matrimony, siray to sew,), Sawasiray, Colque Cruz or Ccolque Cruz (possibly from Aymara and Quechua qullqi silver, money, Spanish cruz cross, "silver cross"), is one of the highest mountains in the Urubamba mountain range in the Andes of Peru, about 5,818 metres (19,088 ft) high. It lies in the Cusco Region, Calca Province, northwest of Calca. It is situated northeast of Chicón and Canchacanchajasa, southeast of Sirihuani and northwest of Condorhuachana.

== See also ==
- List of Ultras of South America
