= Chicón =

Mountain in Peru

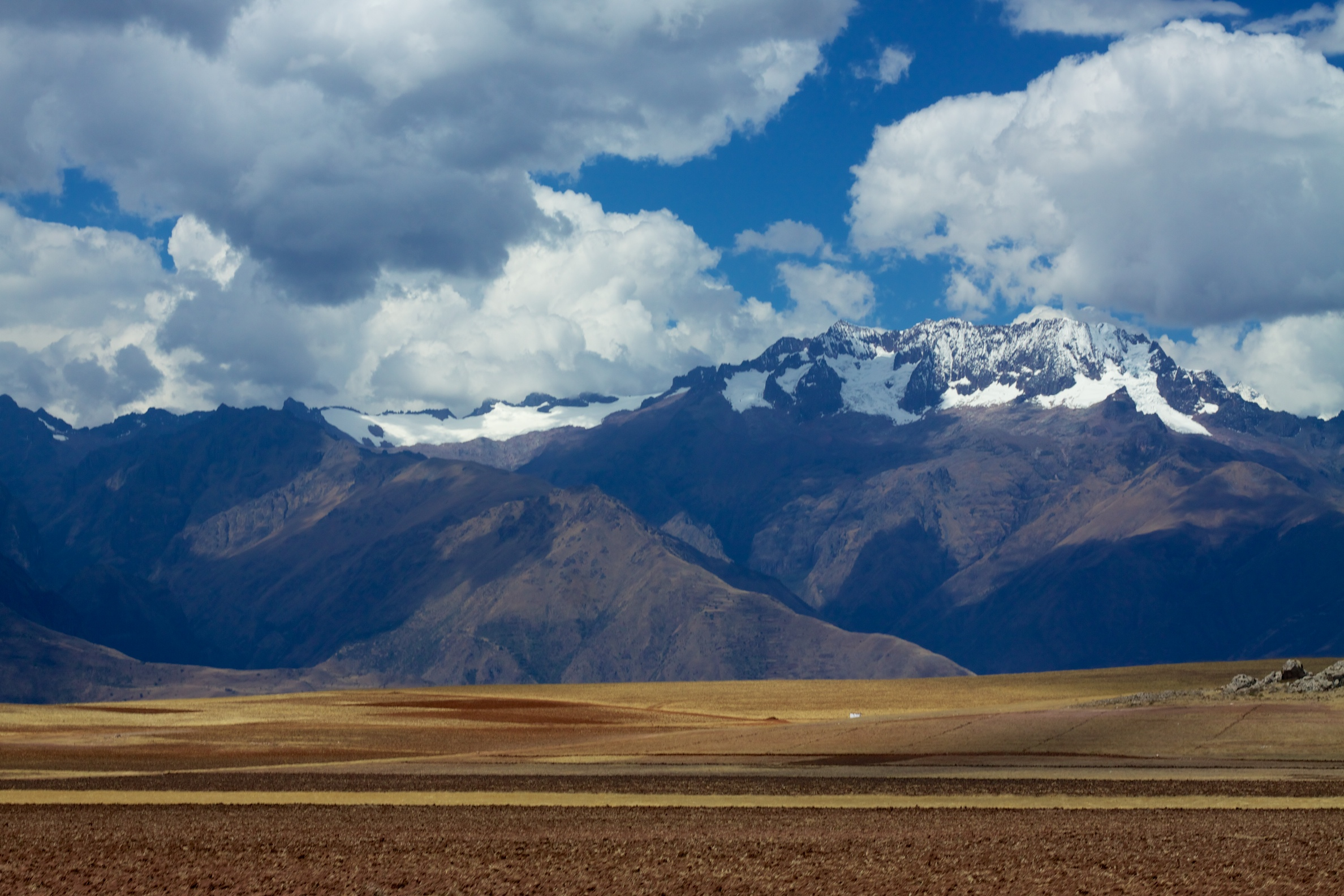
- Mount Chicón as seen from the southwest

Highest point
- Elevation: 5,530 m (18,140 ft)
- Listing: Andes
- Coordinates: 13°14′12″S 72°03′22″W

Geography
- Location within Peru Location within South America
- Location: Urubamba, Cusco Province, Peru
- Parent range: Urubamba, Andes

Climbing
- First ascent: 1-1958: Via prominent snow gully on S.face & ridge

Chicón or Chicon (possibly from Quechua ch'iqu workable stone) is a mountain in the Urubamba mountain range in the Andes of Peru, about 5,530 m (18,140 ft) high. It is located in the Cusco Region, Calca Province, Calca District and in the Urubamba Province, Urubamba District. It is situated northeast of the town of Yucay, southeast of Pumahuanca and southwest of the Sirihuani. The southern part of Chicón is also known as Illahuamán. It belongs to the Yucay District. It reaches a height of 5,060 m (16,601 ft).
