= Urubamba mountain range =

Mountain range in Cusco, Peru

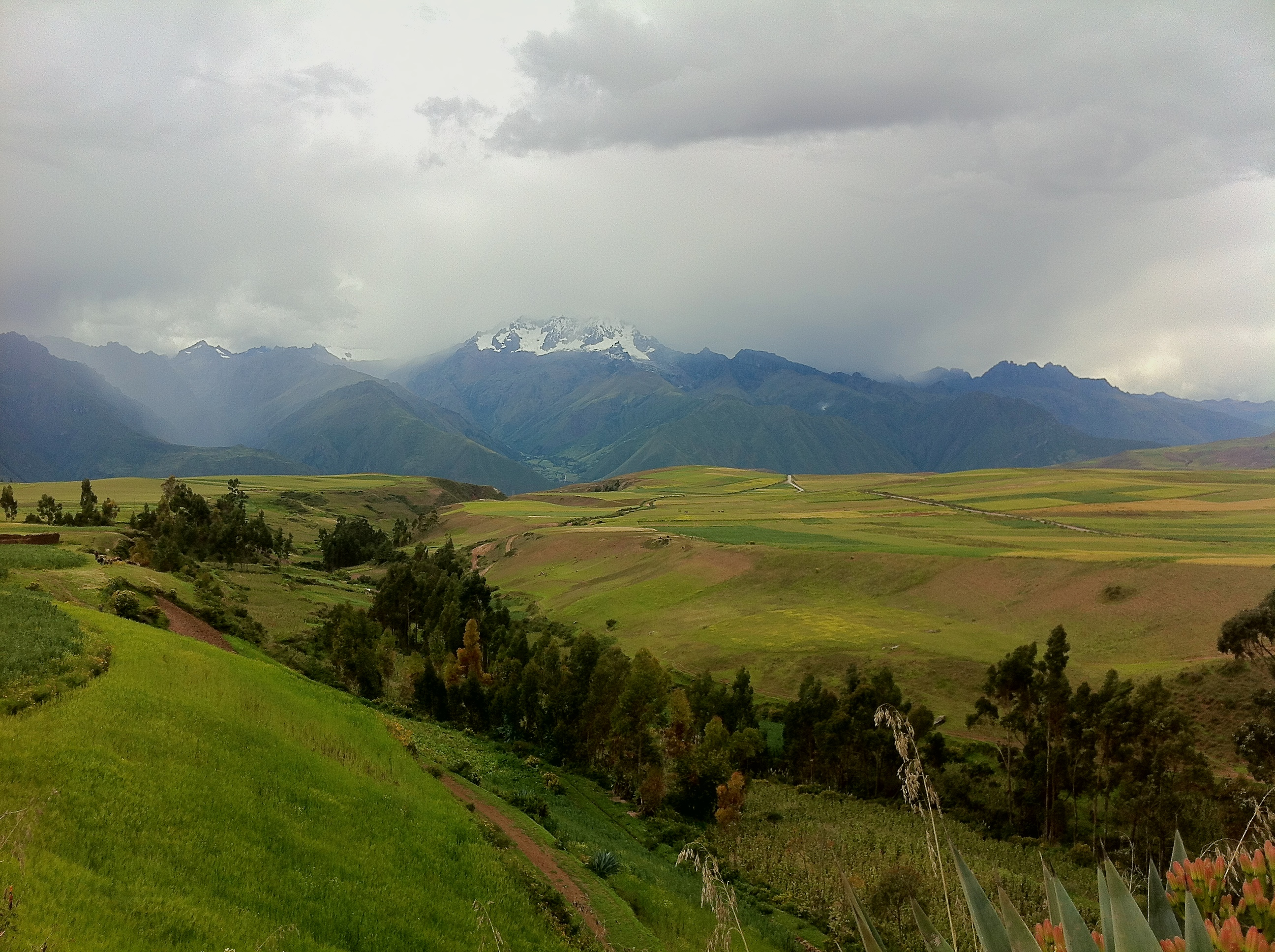
- Chicón (center) as seen from the south west

Highest point
- Peak: Veronica, Sahuasiray
- Elevation: 5,818 m (19,088 ft)
- Coordinates: 13°09′S 72°19′W

Dimensions
- Length: 30 km (19 mi) N-S

Geography
- Country: Peru
- Region: Cusco Region
- Parent range: Andes

The Urubamba mountain range (possibly from Quechua uru spider, pampa a plain) lies in the Cusco Region in Peru. It extends in a northwesterly direction between 13°08' and 13°17'S and 71°58' and 72°16'W for about 30 km.

== Toponyms ==
Most of the names in the range originate from Quechua and Aymara languages. They used to be spelled according to a mainly Spanish-based orthography which is incompatible with the normalized spellings of these languages and Law 29735 which regulates the 'use, preservation, development, recovery, promotion and diffusion of the original languages of Peru'. According to Article 20 of Decreto Supremo No 004-2016-MC (Supreme Decree) which approves the Regulations to Law 29735, published in the official newspaper El Peruano on July 22, 2016, adequate spellings of the toponyms in the normalized alphabets of the indigenous languages must progressively be proposed with the aim of standardizing the namings used by the IGN. The IGN realizes the necessary changes in the official maps of Peru. These changes are part of a process to promote and preserve the indigenous languages.

Hints to wrong spellings are terms containing hua and hui (instead of wa and wi), "e", "o", "ca", "cu", "qu" or diphthongs among others.

== Mountains ==
The highest mountains in the range are Veronica at 5,893 metres (19,334 ft) and Sahuasiray at 5,818 metres (19,088 ft). Other mountains are listed below:

- Chicón, 5,530 metres (18,143 ft)
- Sirihuani, 5,399 metres (17,713 ft)
- Halancoma, 5,367 metres (17,608 ft)
- Huajayhuillca, 5,361 metres (17,589 ft)
- Marconi, 5,340 metres (17,520 ft)
- Pumahuanca, 5,318 metres (17,448 ft)
- Ancasmarca, 5,198 metres (17,054 ft)
- Condorhuachana, 5,073 metres (16,644 ft)
- Huamanchoque, 5,156 metres (16,916 ft)
- Ccerayoc, 5,092 metres (16,706 ft)
- Capacsaya, 5,044 metres (16,549 ft)
- Huacratanca, 5,024 metres (16,483 ft)
- Ajosune, 5,000 metres (16,404 ft)
- Huarmaripayoc, 5,000 metres (16,404 ft)
- Pitusiray, 4,991 metres (16,375 ft)
- Canchacanchajasa, 4,987 metres (16,362 ft)
- Azulorjo, 4,958 metres (16,266 ft)
- Chaquicocha, 4,895 metres (16,060 ft)
- Parorjo, 4,891 metres (16,047 ft)
- Apurinru, 4,880 metres (16,010 ft)
- Pucajasa, 4,800 metres (15,748 ft)
- Pumacallanca, 4,800 metres (15,748 ft)
- Yana Orjo, 4,800 metres (15,748 ft)
- Yanaorcco (Lares), 4,800 metres (15,748 ft)
- Pucaorjo, 4,776 metres (15,669 ft)
- Sutoc, 4,735 metres (15,535 ft)
- Patacancha, 4,666 metres (15,308 ft)
- Coscojahuarina, 4,623 metres (15,167 ft)
- Jatun Huiscana, 4,600 metres (15,092 ft)
- Llamayojcasa, 4,600 metres (15,092 ft)
- Coscojahuarina (Calca), 4,600 metres (15,092 ft)
- Quellorjo, 4,600 metres (15,092 ft)
- Puquiopata, 4,400 metres (14,436 ft)
- Yurac Orjo, 4,400 metres (14,436 ft)
- Maquimaquiyoc, 4,200 metres (13,780 ft)

== Tourism and attractions ==
- Machu Picchu: One of the most famous archaeological sites in the world, Machu Picchu is located near the Urubamba range and attracts millions of tourists annually.
- Hiking and trekking: The area has several trekking routes such as the Inca Trail, Salkantay Trek, and the Lares Trek.
- Adventure activities: Besides trekking, activities like rafting, zip-lining, and mountain biking are also undertaken by tourists.
