= Qurimarka, Cusco =

Archaeological site in Peru

Qurimarka
- Cultures: Inca
- Location: Peru, Cusco Region, Urubamba Province, Ollantaytambo District

Qurimarka (Quechua quri gold, marka village / storey) is an archaeological site in Peru. It is located in the Cusco Region, Urubamba Province, Ollantaytambo District. It is situated at the river Rayanniyuq (Rayanniyoc) and it belongs to the community Rayanniyuq.

== See also ==
- Kusichaka River
- Pinkuylluna
- Pumamarka
- Willka Wiqi
- Willkaraqay
