= Llamahuasi =

Mountain in Peru

- Location within Peru

Highest point
- Elevation: 4,728 m (15,512 ft)
- Coordinates: 13°21′53″S 72°27′43″W

Naming
- Language of name: Quechua

Geography
- Location: Peru, Cusco Region
- Parent range: Andes, Vilcabamba

Llamahuasi (possibly from Quechua llama llama, wasi house, "llama house") is a 4,728-metre-high (15,512 ft) mountain in the Vilcabamba mountain range in the Andes of Peru. It is located in the Cusco Region, Anta Province, Limatambo District, and in the Urubamba Province, Ollantaytambo District. Llamahuasi lies southwest of Mount Huayanay and Ocobamba.
