= Runtuqucha Q'asa =

Mountain in Peru

- Location within Peru

Highest point
- Elevation: 4,200 m (13,800 ft)
- Coordinates: 13°20′05″S 72°24′26″W

Naming
- Language of name: Quechua

Geography
- Location: Peru, Cusco Region
- Parent range: Andes, Willkapampa

Runtuqucha Q'asa (Quechua runtu egg, qucha lake, q'asa mountain pass, "egg lake pass", Hispanicized spelling Runtocochajasa) is a mountain in the Willkapampa mountain range in the Andes of Peru, about 4,200 m (13,780 ft) high. It is located in the Cusco Region, Urubamba Province, Ollantaytambo District. Runtuqucha Q'asa lies southwest of Mount Wayanay. The Pukamayu ("red river"), an intermittent stream which later is called Kiskamayu ("thorn river"), flows along its eastern slopes. It is a right tributary of the Kusichaka River.
