= Jean-Pierre Protzen =

Swiss architect (1934–2021)

- Born: 1934; Switzerland
- Died: 10 January 2021 (aged 86–87); Bern, Switzerland
- Occupation: Architect
- Spouse: Elsbeth Protzen

Academic background
- Education: Collège Saint-Michel; EPFL

Jean-Pierre Protzen (1934 – 10 January 2021) was a Swiss architect and design theorist known for his research on Inca and Tiwanaku architecture. He completed his diploma in architecture at EPF Lausanne in 1962, concurrently working on several architectural design projects. He moved to the United States to work with design theorist Horst Rittel and joined University of California, Berkeley's Department of Architecture faculty in 1968. In the early 1980s, he gained an interest in Inca masonry techniques, beginning fieldwork and research at Incan archaeological sites such as Ollantaytambo.

== Early life and education ==
Jean-Pierre Protzen was born in Switzerland in 1934. He obtained a Matura in Latin sciences at the Collège Saint-Michel in Fribourg in 1954. He completed his diploma in architecture at EPF Lausanne in 1962.

== Career ==
After graduating from the University of Lausanne, Protzen went on to work in the offices of several architects, including that of Swiss-French architect Le Corbusier. From 1957 to 1967, he worked on several architectural design projects, some involving prefabricated buildings. He taught at ETH Zürich's architecture department from 1964 to 1967. He obtained a research fellowship from the Swiss National Science Foundation in 1967, taking him to the United States to conduct research on information storage and retrieval on the urban rental housing market. While in the United States he worked with design theorist Horst Rittel, and in 1968 he began teaching at UC Berkeley in California, joining its Department of Architecture at a time when the study of design methods was taking shape. From 1972 to 1975, he worked as an editor at the journal Design Methods. He became vice-chair of UC Berkeley's Department of Architecture in 1979, becoming its chair in 1983 (a position he would hold a further two times).

In the early 1980s, Protzen made his first trip to Peru. He visited the Inca ruins at Cusco and Machu Picchu. Impressed by the construction of the ruins, he submitted a research proposal to UC Berkeley with the encouragement from an archaeological scholar. Around this time, Incan masonry techniques were still unknown to archaeologists. He made his first research trip in 1982–83. He visited the site at Ollantaytambo in 1982, carrying out fieldwork and investigating the quarries at Kachi Qhata and Rumicolca. He worked with fellow architect Mary C. Comerio to research Incan construction methods—one of their more humorous hypotheses was that the Incans used animal fat to slide stones into place. Protzen and Comerio's research at Cuzco ultimately showed that river rocks could have been used to hammer stones into the needed shapes. His work at Ollantaytambo would span a decade, which including researching Pachacuti's estate at the site.

He worked with Stella Nair on researching Tiwanaku masonry techniques. The two focused on determining if Inca masonry techniques had been imported from the Tiwanaku, concluding that the Inca independently developed their own technique. They published their results in 1997–2013. He served on the Institute of Andean Studies's board of directors from 1998 to 2002. He was a part of the advisory committee for UC Berkeley's Archaeological Research Facility from 2004 to 2007.

== Personal life and death ==
He was married to his wife, Elsbeth Protzen. He died on 10 January 2021 in Bern, Switzerland. His wife died a few days prior.

== Publications ==
=== Books ===
Protzen published three books:

- Inca Architecture and Construction at Ollantaytambo. Illustrated by Robert Batson. Oxford University Press. 1993.
- with Harris, David J. (2010). The Universe of Design. Horst Rittel's Theories of Design and Planning. Routledge.
- with Nair, Stella (2013). The Stones of Tiahuanaco: A Study of Architecture and Construction. Cotsen Institute of Archaeology Press.

=== Selected articles ===
Some of Protzen's articles include:

- Protzen, Jean-Pierre (May 1985). "Inca Quarrying and Stonecutting". Journal of the Society of Architectural Historians. 44 (2): 161–182.
- Protzen, Jean-Pierre (February 1986). "Inca Stonemasonry". Scientific American. 254 (2): 94–105.
- "The fortress of Saqsa Waman: Was it ever finished?". Ñawpa Pacha. 25 (1): 155–175. June 1987.
- with Morris, Craig (April 2004). "Los colores de Tambo Colorado: una reevaluación". Boletín de Arqueología PUCP (8): 267–276.
- "Max Uhle and Tambo Colorado a century later". Ñawpa Pacha. 28 (1): 11–40. June 2006.
- "Times go by at Tambo Colorado". Ñawpa Pacha. 29 (1): 221–240. June 2008.
