= Destilería Andina =

Distillery in Cusco, Peru

- Industry: Alcoholic Beverage
- Founded: 2010s
- Headquarters: Ollantaytambo, Peru
- Products: Cañazo
- Brands: Matacuy, Salqa
- Website: destileriaandina.com/

Destilería Andina is a distillery located in Ollantaytambo, Cusco in Peru's Sacred Valley. The company produces sugarcane-based spirits inspired by Andean distillation traditions.

== History ==
Destilería Andina was established in the early 2010s by brothers Ishmael Randall-Weeks and Joaquín Randall and their friend Haresh Bhojwani. The company makes rhum agricole spirits from freshly-pressed and distilled sugarcane, commonly known in Peru as cañazo.

== Products ==
One of the company's first products, Matacuy, is an adaptation of a traditional macerated spirit made from sugarcane alcohol infused with Andean herbs and botanicals. In 2019, Matacuy was included in an editorial list of notable spirits published by Bon Appétit.

Salqa is the company's range of sugarcane-based spirits previously marketed under the name Caña Alta.
