= Quellorjo (Cusco) =

Mountain in Peru

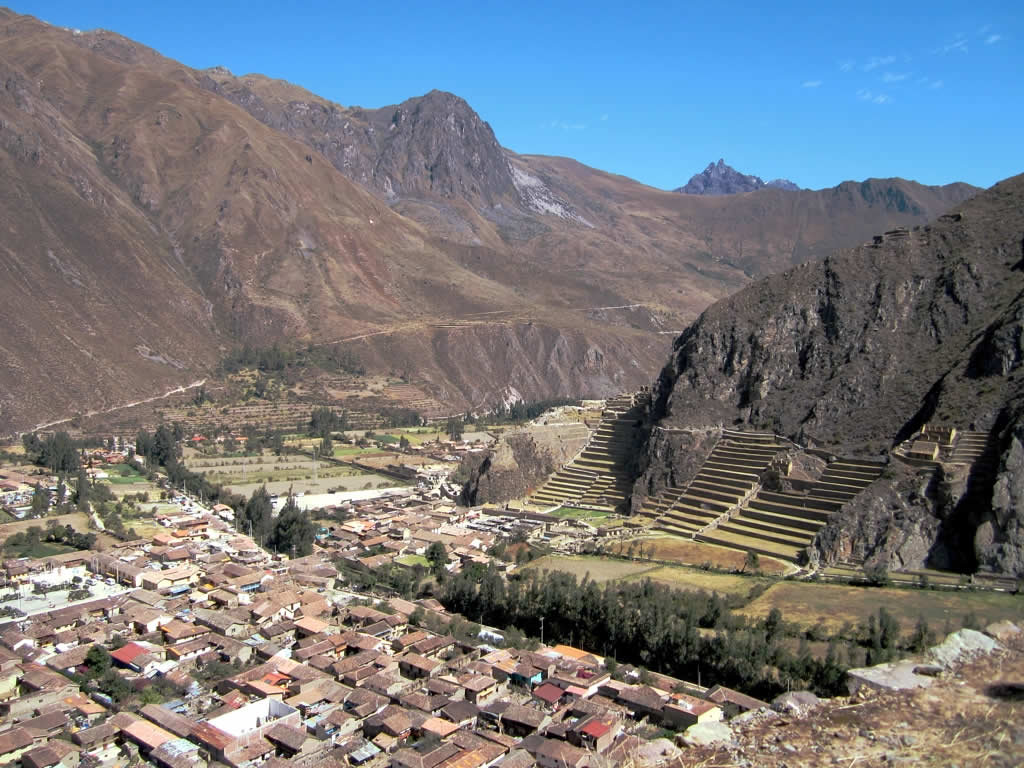
- Inca runis on the southern slope of Quellorjo (on the right) in Ollantaytambo

Highest point
- Elevation: 4,600 m (15,100 ft)
- Coordinates: 13°13′12″S 72°16′02″W

Naming
- Language of name: Quechua

Geography
- Location within Peru
- Location: Peru, Cusco Region
- Parent range: Andes, Urubamba

Quellorjo (possibly from Quechua q'illu yellow, urqu mountain, "yellow mountain") is a mountain in the Urubamba mountain range in the Andes of Peru, about 4,600 m (15,092 ft) high. It is located in the Cusco Region, Urubamba Province, Ollantaytambo District, northwest of Ollantaytambo. It lies southwest of Yurac Orjo ("white mountain").
