= Huarmaripayoc =

Mountain in Peru

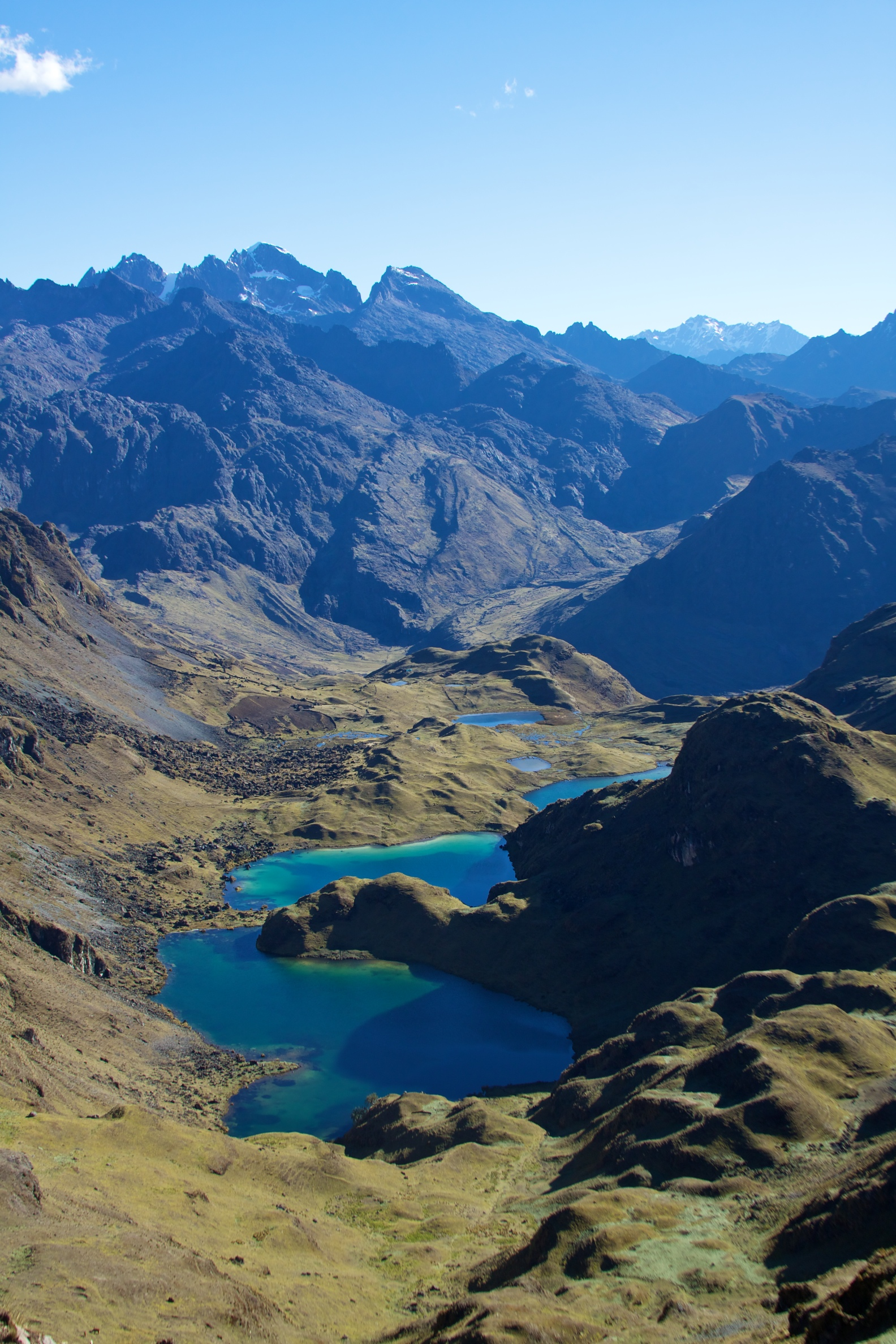
- Pumahuanca (on the left) and snow-covered Halancoma (in the background on the right) as seen from Quellacocha

Highest point
- Elevation: 5,000 m (16,000 ft)
- Coordinates: 13°09′54″S 72°14′35″W

Geography
- Location within Peru
- Location: Peru
- Parent range: Andes, Urupampa

Huarmaripayoc (possibly from Quechua wamanripa Senecio, -yuq a suffix) is a mountain in the Urubamba mountain range in the Andes of Peru, about 5,000 m (16,404 ft) high. It is located in the Cusco Region, Urubamba Province, Ollantaytambo District. It lies southwest of Patacancha and northwest of Salcayoc.
