= Kachi Qhata =

Coordinates: 13°15′31″S 72°17′18″W

Kachi Qhata (Quechua kachi salt, qhata slope, hillside, "salt slope", also spelled Cachiccata) is a slope in the Cusco Region in Peru with quarries used as a source of porphyry by the Incas. It is located in the Urubamba Province, Ollantaytambo District, about 9 km southwest of Ollantaytambo. It lies near the peak of Yana Urqu.

Kachi Qhata is also the name of two little villages (Cachiccata and Ccacheccata) and a stream (Cachijata) near the slope.
