= Pumamarka, Urubamba =

Archaeological site in Peru

Pumamarka
- Interactive map of Pumamarka
- 13°13′43″S 72°14′02″W
- Location: Peru, Cusco Region, Urubamba Province
- Region: Andes

Pumamarka (Aymara and Quechua puma cougar, puma, marka village, "puma village", Hispanicized spelling Pumamarca) is an archaeological site in Peru. It is located in the Cusco Region, Urubamba Province, Ollantaytambo District, at the confluence of the rivers Patakancha and its affluent Yuraqmayu (Quechua for "white river", Hispanicized Yuracmayo).

== See also ==
- Kusichaka River
- Ullantaytampu
- Pinkuylluna
- Willka Wiqi
- Willkaraqay
