= Qosqoccahuarina, Urubamba =

Conservation area in Peru

Coordinates: 13°09′12″S 72°11′58″W

Qosqoccahuarina
- Qosqoccahuarina is a area of conservation in the Andes of Peru
- Interactive map of Qosqoccahuarina
- Location: Peru; Cusco Region, Urubamba Province, Ollantaytambo District

Qosqoccahuarina (possibly from Quechua qusqu boundary stone; nucleus; navel; heap of earth and stones; bed, dry bed of a lake, Qusqu Cusco (a city), qhawarina, qhawana viewpoint) is a private area of conservation in the Urubamba mountain range in the Andes of Peru. It is located in the Cusco Region, Urubamba Province, Ollantaytambo District. It lies in the community of Rumira Sondormayo (Rumira Sondor Mayo, Sondor Mayo Rumira or Sunturmayu Rumira) at the Patacancha valley near Patacancha. The area of conservation of Qosqoccahuarina is recognized by Resolución Ministerial No. 089-2011-MINAM. The aim is to protect the Polylepis forest and its avifauna, the hydrographical basins of the community and the wild flora and fauna of the Andean highlands.
