= Huacratanca =

Mountain in Peru

- Location within Peru

Highest point
- Elevation: 5,024 m (16,483 ft)
- Coordinates: 13°08′36″S 72°13′54″W

Geography
- Location: Peru
- Parent range: Andes, Urubamba

Huacratanca (possibly from Quechua waqra horn, tanka fork) is a 5,024-metre-high (16,483 ft) mountain in the Urubamba mountain range in the Andes of Peru. It is located in the Cusco Region, Urubamba Province, Ollantaytambo District. It lies northwest of Salcayoc and Patacancha, and northeast of Huarmaripayoc.
