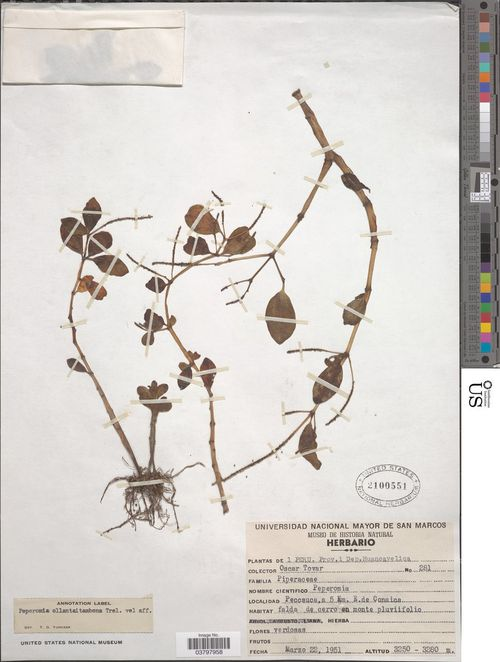

Scientific classification
- Kingdom: Plantae
- Clade: Tracheophytes
- Clade: Angiosperms
- Clade: Magnoliids
- Order: Piperales
- Family: Piperaceae
- Genus: Peperomia
- Species: P. ollantaitambona

Binomial name
- Peperomia ollantaitambona Trel.

= Peperomia ollantaitambona =

Species of plant

Peperomia ollantaitambona is a species of terrestrial or epiphytic herb in the genus Peperomia that is native to Peru. It grows on wet tropical biomes. Its conservation status is Threatened.

== Description ==
The type specimen were collected at Ollantaitambo, Peru at an altitude of 2300-3100 meters above sea level.

Peperomia ollantaitambona is a somewhat small, ascending, succulent herb with a stem 2–3 mm thick and short internodes densely covered in papillose-puberulous hairs. The leaves are mostly opposite. They are elliptic, obtuse or abruptly bluntly short-acuminate, with an acute base, measuring 1.5–3 cm long and 1–2 cm wide. They are delicately 5-nerved, with the midrib obscurely branched, and when dry are thin and pellucid. The petiole is 5 mm long. The spikes are terminal and from the uppermost axils, 25 mm long and 1 mm thick, with loosely arranged flowers, and are borne on a 1 cm peduncle.

== Taxonomy and naming ==
It was described in 1936 by William Trelease in Publications of the Field Museum of Natural History, Botanical Series 13, from specimens collected by Francis W. Pennell.

The epithet is derived from the type locality.

== Distribution and habitat ==
It is native to Peru. It grows as a terrestrial or epiphytic herb. It grows on wet tropical biomes.

== Conservation ==
This species is assessed as Threatened, in a preliminary report.
