= Qhispi Rumiyuq =

Mountain in Peru

- Location within Peru

Highest point
- Elevation: 4,600 m (15,100 ft)
- Coordinates: 13°11′41″S 72°13′21″W

Naming
- Language of name: Quechua

Geography
- Location: Peru, Cusco Region, Urubamba Province
- Parent range: Andes

Qhispi Rumiyuq (Quechua qhispi rumi, obsidian (qhispi, q'ispi, qispi glass, transparent body, rumi stone, literally glass stone or transparent stone, -yuq a suffix to indicate ownership, "the one with obsidian", Hispanicized spelling Esperumiyoc) is a mountain in the Cusco Region in Peru, about 4,600 m (15,100 ft) high. It is situated in the Urubamba Province, Ollantaytambo District, northeast of Ollantaytambo.
