= Huajayhuillca =

Mountain in Peru

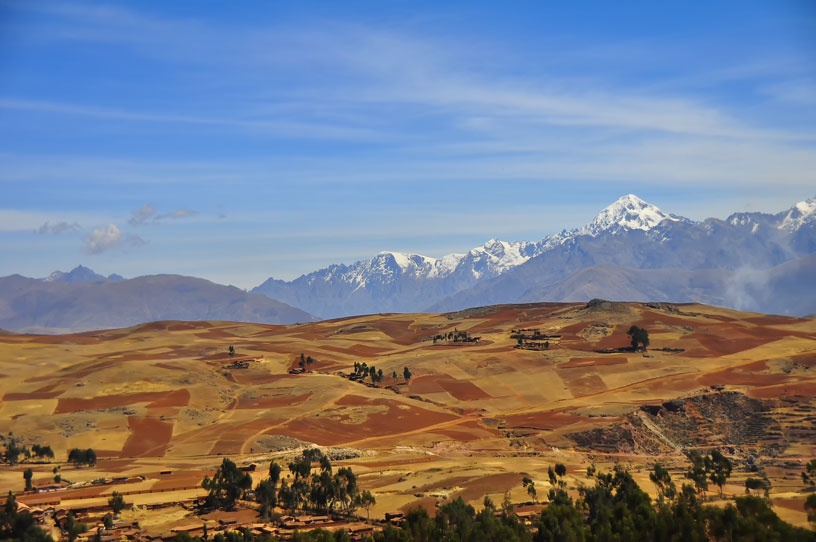
- Fields with the Urubamba range and Huajayhuillca (center) in the background

Highest point
- Elevation: 5,361 m (17,589 ft)
- Coordinates: 13°09′54″S 72°22′14″W

Geography
- Location within Peru Location within South America
- Location: Cusco, Peru
- Parent range: Andes, Urubamba

Huajayhuillca (possibly from Quechua waqay to cry, willka Anadenanthera colubrina) is a mountain in the Urubamba mountain range in the Andes of Peru, with an elevation of 5,361 m (17,589 ft). It is located in the Cusco Region, La Convención Province, Huayopata District, and in the Urubamba Province, Ollantaytambo District. Huajayhuillca lies southwest of Marconi.
