= Inkapintay =

Archaeological site in Peru

- Inkapintayuq
- Interactive map of Inkapintay
- Location: Peru
- Region: Cusco Region, Urubamba Province

Inkapintay (Quechua Inka Inca, pintay to paint / painting (a borrowing from Spanish pintar to paint), "Inka painting") or Inkapintayuq (-yuq a suffix to indicate ownership, "the one with an Inka painting", also spelled Inkapintayoq) is an archaeological site in Peru with a rock painting. It is situated in the Cusco Region, Urubamba Province, Ollantaytambo District, near Ollantaytambo. The figure which draws the attention possibly depicts a noble person.
