= Awamaki =

Peruvian non-profit organization

- Industry: NGO
- Founded: 2009
- Headquarters: Ollantaytambo, Peru and Seattle, Washington, United States
- Key people: Kennedy Leavens (Executive Director)
- Website: http://www.awamaki.org

Awamaki is a non-profit with a stated goal of creating economic opportunities and uplifting social well-being in rural Peru. It is registered in the United States as a 501(c)(3) and in Peru as a non-profit civil association. Awamaki is diversified and currently provides programs in health, education, cultural preservation and sustainable tourism.

Awamaki is located in the town of Ollantaytambo, which is between the Inca Capital city of Cusco and Machu Picchu, a U.N. World Heritage site. Ollantaytambo is the departure point to Machu Picchu, which welcomes nearly 1 500 000 tourists annually. Nearly all tourists pass through Ollantaytambo on their way to Machu Picchu. Ollantaytambo also has its own ruins which tourists navigate daily. While the tourism industry has brought prosperity and modern conveniences to Ollantaytambo, the mission of Awamaki is to assure these benefits support the population of the entire region.

== Brief history ==
Awamaki was founded by Kennedy Leavens, Paula Reiss and Miguel Galdo in January 2009. Awamaki's principal program is the fair trade weaving project which, as of 2015, supports five associations of women from impoverished rural Quechua communities in the Patacancha Valley.

Prior to this, the program had run for five years under the auspices of another local NGO called CATCCO, after important changes in the board of directors, the project was set up anew under the name Awamaki. Awamaki's mission is to collaborate with the people of Ollantaytambo and its surroundings to create lasting economic opportunities and to improve social well-being.

Awamaki has grown and increase the number of its activities, but remains centered around the common objective of using international resources and market knowledge to help improve the incomes and wellbeing of economically marginalized individuals. Currently, the Awamaki Women's Cooperative Program includes 60 women in two weaving cooperatives in Indigenous communities, a knitting cooperative of over 15 women and a sewing cooperative of three. Additionally, Awamaki has initiated collaboration with a group of 10 young Quechua adults, engaged in the hand-spinning of luxury alpaca yarns for export.

Awamaki's homestay program is expanding as more tourists choose homestay accommodations. Awamaki's newest women's cooperative, the Spanish Teachers' Cooperative, which will teach Spanish to volunteers and tourists while providing rural women with the opportunity to improve their income

=== Awamaki Lab ===
Awamaki Lab hosts young designers in an internship that connects them to the textile weaving production process. The designers incorporate the textiles into contemporary pieces which are later reproduced by a local sewing cooperative of underemployed women. The sale of these pieces online provides yet another channel of sale for the weavers.

Stemming from the Weaving Project are the Awamaki Knitting Project and Awamaki Lab. The Knitting Project works with a cooperative of 14 women from Huayroncoyocpampa, a neighborhood just outside Ollantaytambo. The homes of these 14 women were destroyed in floods that swept through the valley in 2010, and in an effort to earn extra income, the women formed a knitting coop and established a partnership with Awamaki. With a similar business model to the Weaving Project, the knitters have had much success in their first year and are looking to expand their market access with international sales.

== Economic Survival for Quechua Culture ==
Animals, Fibers and Spinning

Most of the wool that Awamaki weavers work with is shorn from their own sheep and alpaca. Llama wool is also used, but being very coarse it is used only for utilitarian items such as sacks, ropes and horse blankets.

Iconography

Andean weaving includes a rich tradition of iconography. The designs and motifs used in Quechua textiles are passed down from generation to generation and are repeated over and over again in the weavings. Each pallay (or design) has an important meaning for the weaver, although the meanings attributed to each pallay may vary between regions and villages. Each weaver chooses how to use the multitudes of pallays that she knows in each of her pieces.

The textile designs are based on the daily lives of the Quechua weavers. They are inspired by agriculture, flora and fauna of the region, astrological phenomenon, human forms, bodies of water, and geometric designs. Often pallay are loosely based on their inspiration and may show a highly stylized version of the objects or event it is depicting. For example, instead of showing the entire animal, weavers may choose to represent an animal through a footprint. Complicated patterns are made by combining and repeating many different pallay.

== Tourism ==
=== Background ===
The Awamaki Sustainable Tourism Program works to connect women, families and the rural poor with the economic opportunities that tourism brings. Tourism programs include: homestay program, Quechua community visits, weaving education tourism program, artisanal workshops and Spanish language classes.

Awamaki works to encourage visitors to stay longer in Ollantaytambo and spend their money in ways that produce tangible benefits for the local economy through homestays & workshops with local artisans.

Awamaki's tourism program also focuses on the promotion of Ollantaytambo as the ultimate Andean vacation destination and gateway to the deservedly famous Inca citadel Machu Picchu.

The non-profit administrates a Tourist Welcome Center on the street leading to the Ollanta ruins. Visitors can receive information about adventure activities such as trekking, bike tours and can direct tourists to local guides and taxi drivers. They also have a hotel directory, information about volunteering in Ollantaytambo and restaurant recommendations.

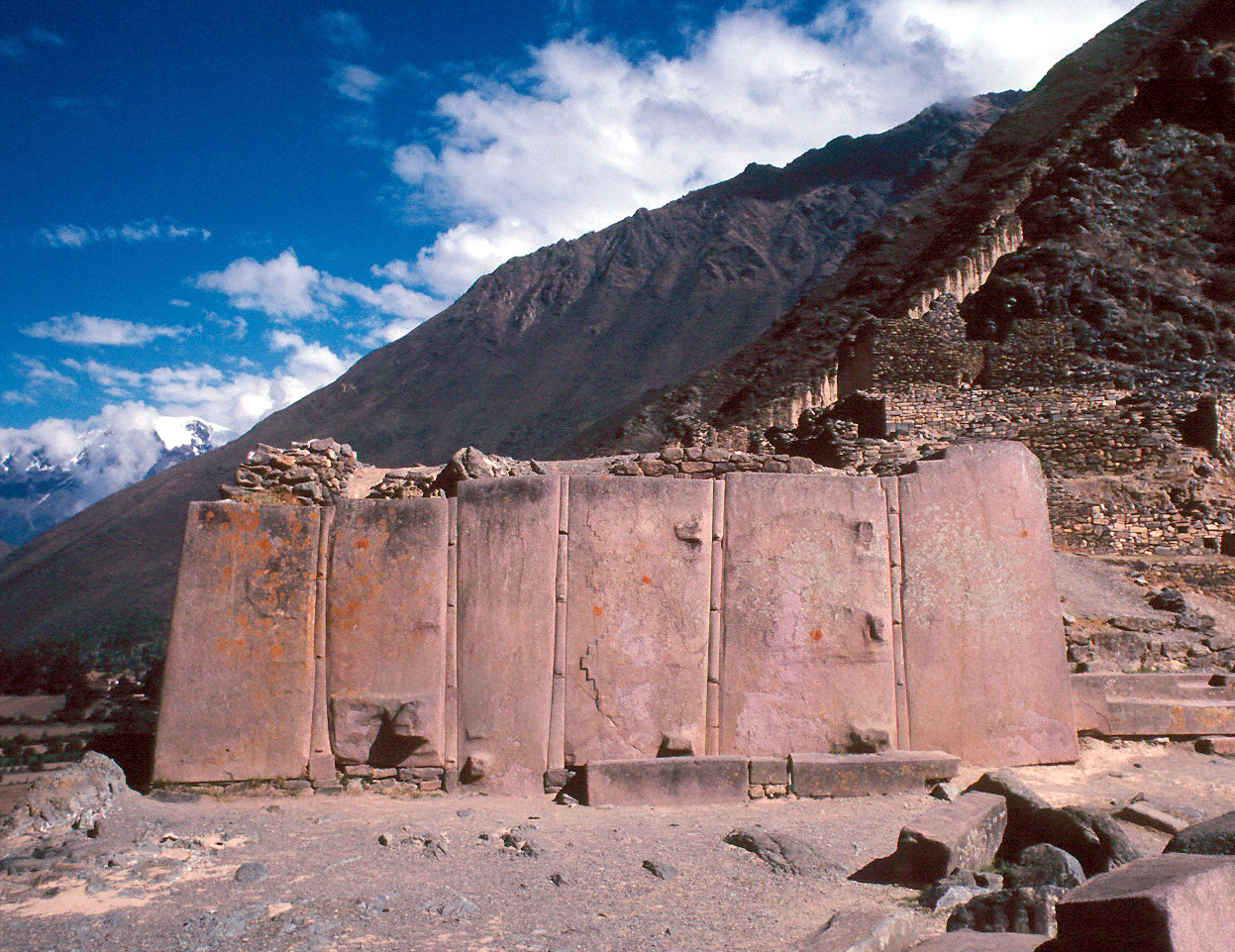
Wall of the Six Monoliths
