= Ocobamba =

Mountain in Peru

- Location within Peru

Highest point
- Elevation: 5,126 m (16,818 ft)
- Coordinates: 13°20′38″S 72°26′18″W

Naming
- Language of name: Quechua

Geography
- Location: Peru, Cusco Region
- Parent range: Andes, Vilcabamba

Ocobamba (possibly from Quechua uqhu swamp, pampa a large plain, "swamp plain") is a 5,126-metre-high (16,818 ft) mountain in the Vilcabamba mountain range in the Andes of Peru. It is located in the Cusco Region, Anta Province, Limatambo District, and in the Urubamba Province, Ollantaytambo District. Ocobamba lies southwest of Mount Huayanay.
