= Yana Urqu (Urubamba) =

Mountain in Peru

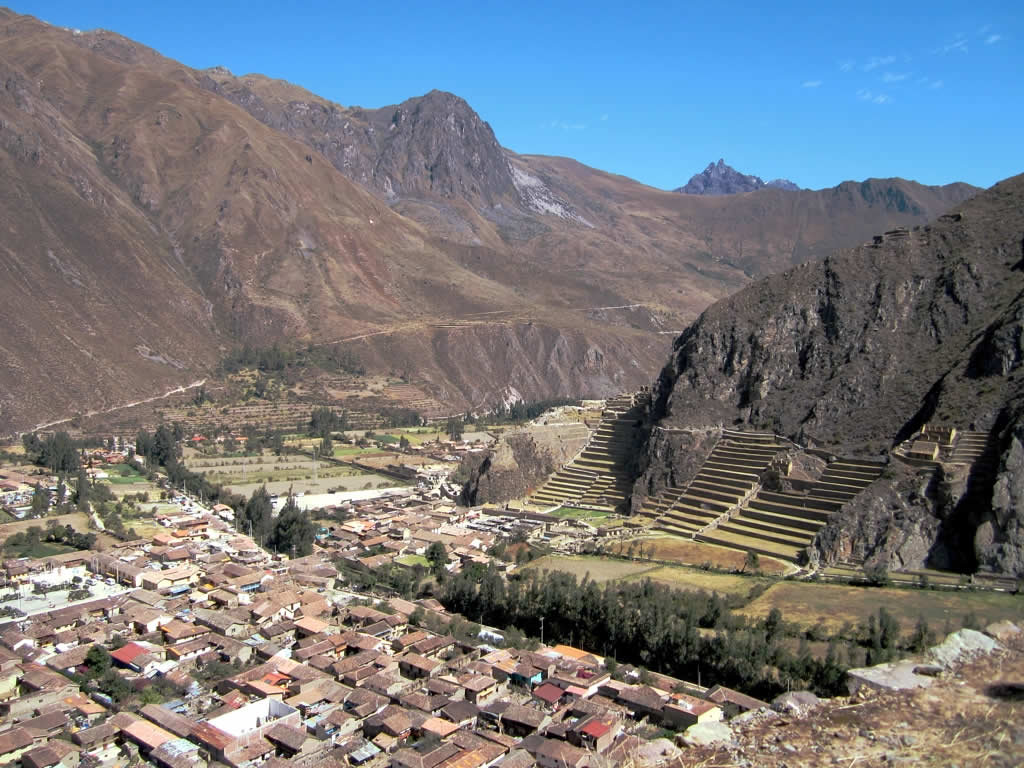
- Yana Urqu (center-left) as seen from Ollantaytambo

Highest point
- Elevation: 4,460 m (14,630 ft)
- Coordinates: 13°16′24″S 72°18′18″W

Naming
- Language of name: Quechua

Geography
- Location within Peru
- Location: Peru, Cusco Region
- Parent range: Andes

Yana Urqu (Quechua yana black, urqu mountain, "black mountain", Hispanicized spelling Yanaorjo) is a 4,460-metre-high (14,633 ft) mountain in the eastern extensions of the Willkapampa mountain range in the Andes of Peru. It is located in the Cusco Region, Urubamba Province, Ollantaytambo District, southwest of Ollantaytambo.
