= Urubamba province =

Coordinates: 13.310334°S 72.12°W

Urubamba
- Province
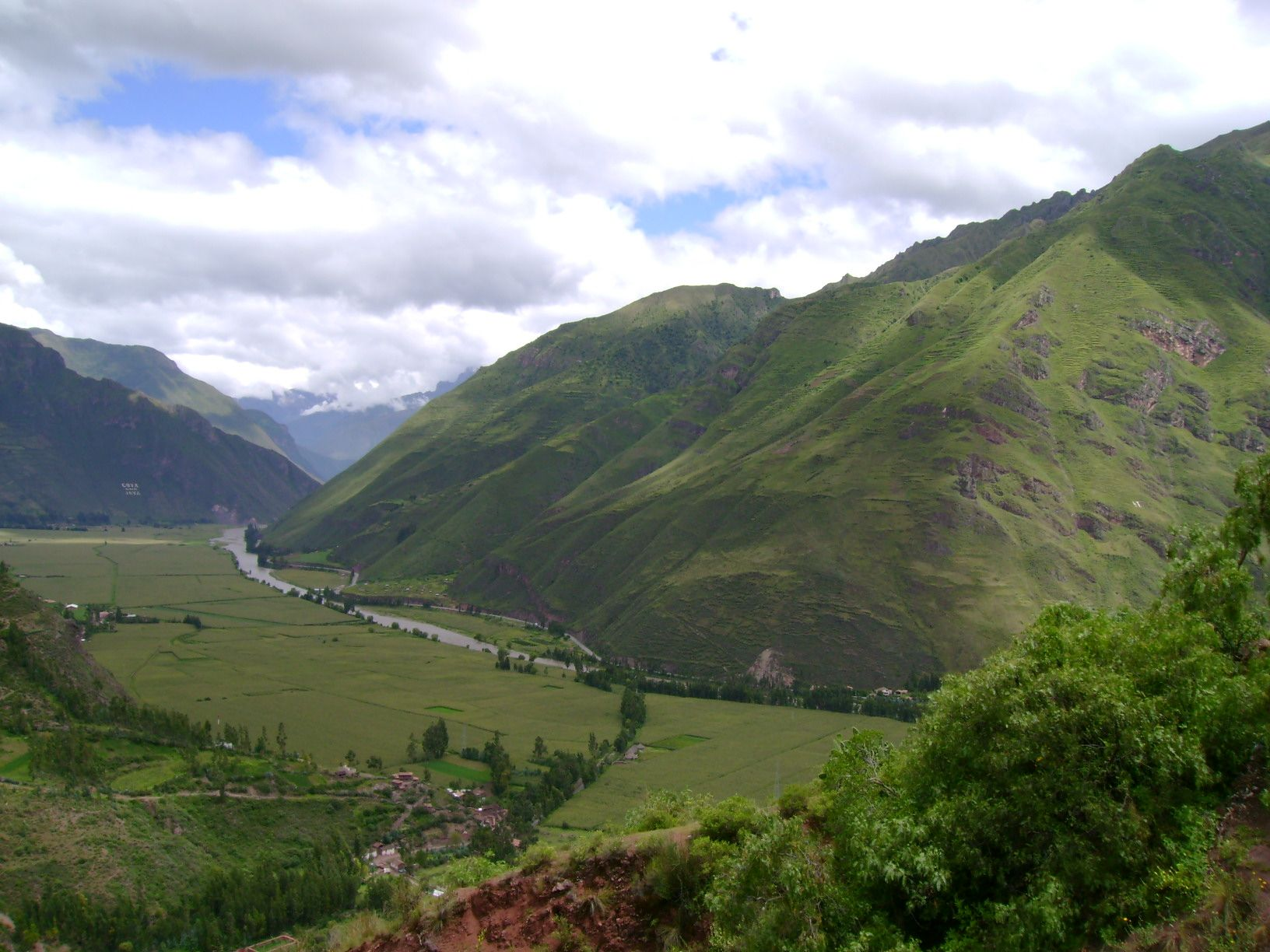
- The Urubamba River in the Sacred Valley of the province of Urubamba

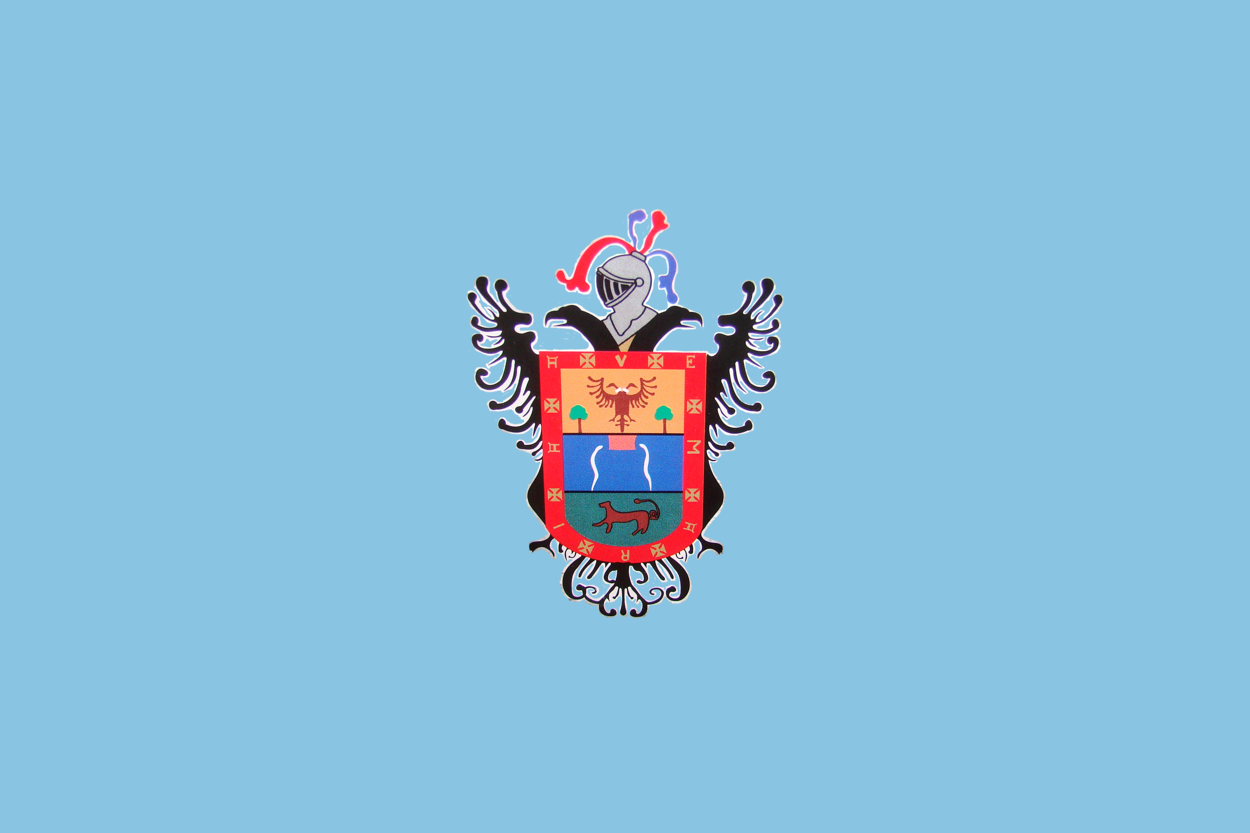
- Flag

- Location of Urubamba in the Cusco Region
- Country: Peru
- Region: Cusco
- Capital: Urubamba

Government
  - Mayor: Luis Alberto Valcarcel Villegas (2019–2022)

Area
  - Total: 1,439.4 km^{2} (555.8 sq mi)

Population
  - Total: 60,739
  - Density: 42.197/km^{2} (109.29/sq mi)
- UBIGEO: 0813
- Website: www.muniurubamba.gob.pe

Urubamba is one of thirteen provinces in the Cusco Region in the southern highlands of Peru.

== Geography ==
The province is bounded to the north by the province of La Convención, to the east by the province of Calca, to the south by the province of Cusco and the province of Anta, and to the west by the province of La Convención.

The Urupampa and Willkapampa mountain ranges traverse the province. Some of the highest peaks of the province are listed below:

- Ana Willka Q'asa
- Ch'akiqucha
- Ch'iqun
- Hatun Luychu
- K'urkur Urqu
- Llama Wasi
- Llawlliyuq
- Marquni
- Masanayuq
- Minasniyuq
- Muyuq
- Pata Kancha
- Pinkuylluna
- Puka Q'asa
- Pumawank'a
- Phutuq K'usi
- P'allqay
- Qhapaq Saya
- Qhispi Rumiyuq
- Q'illu Urqu
- Runtuqucha Q'asa
- Sallqantay
- Sallqayuq
- Sut'uq
- Tampu Mach'ay
- Taruka Kancha
- Uqhupampa
- Waqay Willka
- Waqra Tanka
- Wamanripayuq
- Wayanay
- Wayna Pikchu
- Willka Wiqi
- Yana Urqu
- Yuraq Urqu

== Political division ==
The province is divided into seven districts (Spanish: distritos, singular: distrito), each of which is headed by a mayor (alcalde). The districts, with their capitals in parentheses, are:

- Chinchero (Chinchero)
- Huayllabamba (Huayllabamba)
- Machupicchu (Machupicchu)
- Maras (Maras)
- Ollantaytambo (Ollantaytambo)
- Urubamba (Urubamba)
- Yucay (Yucay)

== Ethnic groups ==
The people in the province are mainly indigenous citizens of Quechua descent. Quechua is the language which the majority of the population (51.34%) learnt to speak in childhood, 46.78% of the residents started speaking using the Spanish language (2007 Peru Census).

== Archaeological sites ==
The UNESCO World Heritage Site of Machu Pikchu is probably the most famous site among the numerous archaeological remains of the province. Other places are listed below:

- Ayawayq'u
- Inkapintay
- Khichuqaqa
- Machu Q'inti
- Machu Qullqa
- Pumamarka
- Qurimarka
- Wayna Q'inti

== See also ==
- Kachi Qhata
- Kusichaka River
- Pakaymayu
- Qusqu Qhawarina
- Q'illuqucha
- Warmi Wañusqa
- Yanaqucha

== Images ==
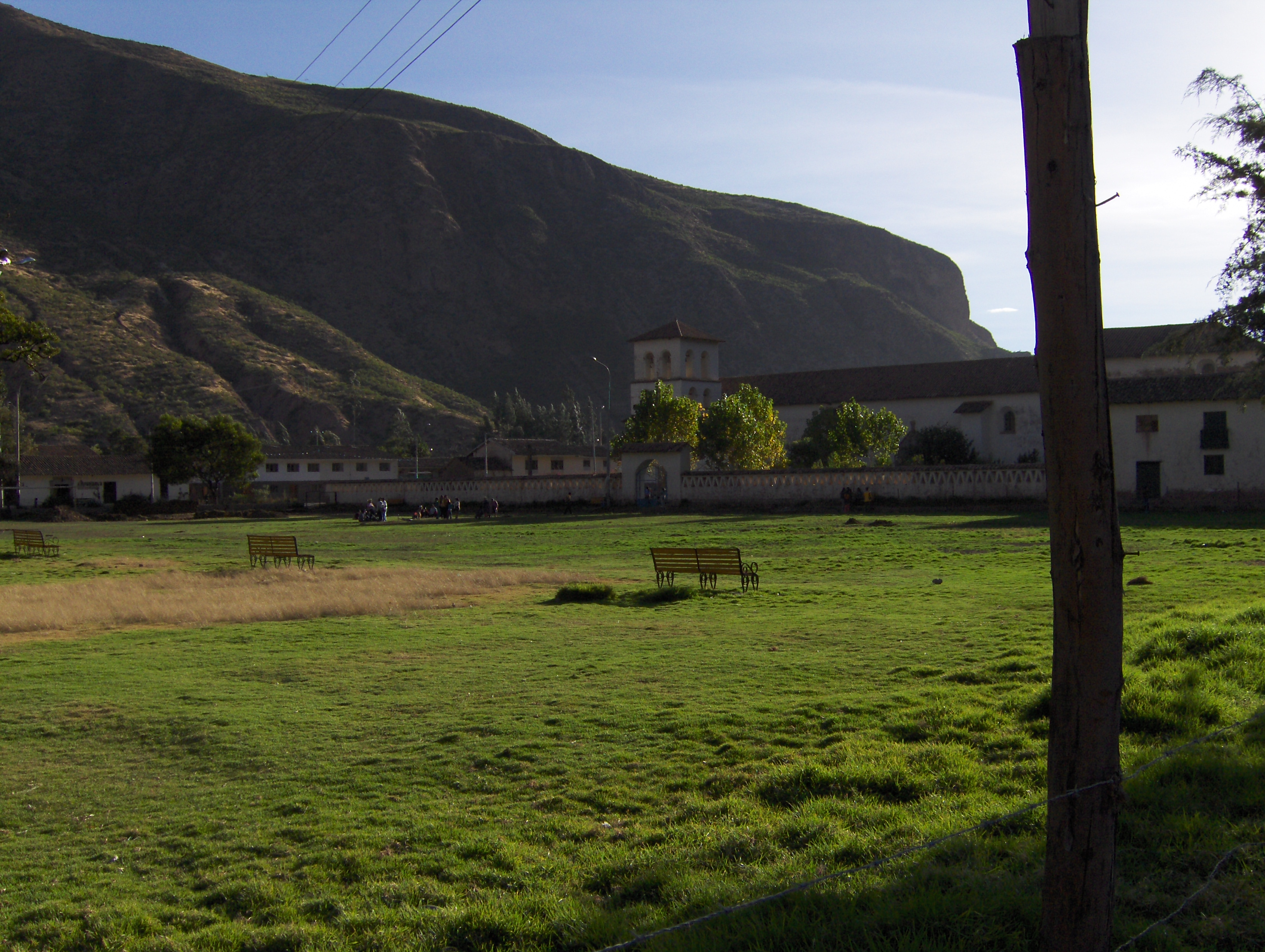
A view across one of two central parks of Yucay
