= Patacancha =

Mountain in Peru

- Location within Peru

Highest point
- Elevation: 4,666 m (15,308 ft)
- Coordinates: 13°09′12″S 72°12′58″W

Naming
- Language of name: Quechua

Geography
- Location: Peru, Cusco Region
- Parent range: Andes, Urubamba

Patacancha (possibly from Quechua pata step, bank of a river, kancha corral, "step corral" or "bank corral") is a 4,666-metre-high (15,308 ft) mountain in the Urubamba mountain range in the Andes of Peru. It is located in the Cusco Region, Urubamba Province, Ollantaytambo District. Patacancha lies at the Patacancha River above the village of Patacancha, northeast of Huarmaripayoc and southeast of Huacratanca.
