= Marconi (mountain) =

Mountain in Peru

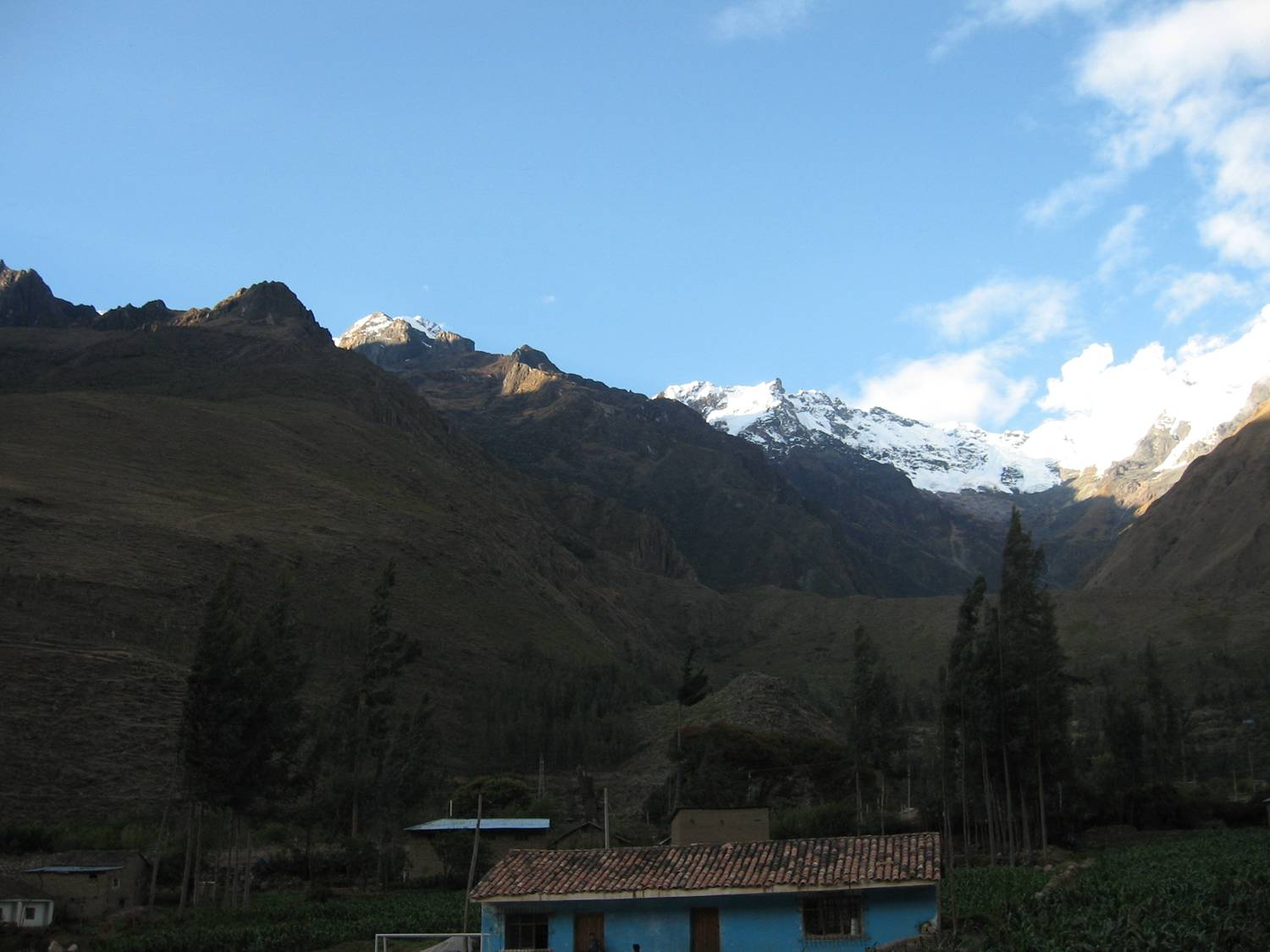
- Marconi (center) and Veronica (on the right)

Highest point
- Elevation: 5,300 m (17,400 ft)
- Coordinates: 13°09′33″S 72°21′07″W

Geography
- Location within Peru
- Location: Peru
- Parent range: Andes, Urubamba

Marconi (possibly from Aymara marqu a medical plant, -ni a suffix, "the one with the marqu plant") is a mountain in the Urubamba mountain range in the Andes of Peru, about 5,340 m (17,520 ft) high. It is located in the Cusco Region, La Convención Province, Huayopata District, and in the Urubamba Province, Ollantaytambo District. It lies north of the Urubamba River, west of Veronica.
