= Ollantaytambo District =

Coordinates: 13.2574°S 72.2631°W

Ollantaytambo Ullantaytampu
- District
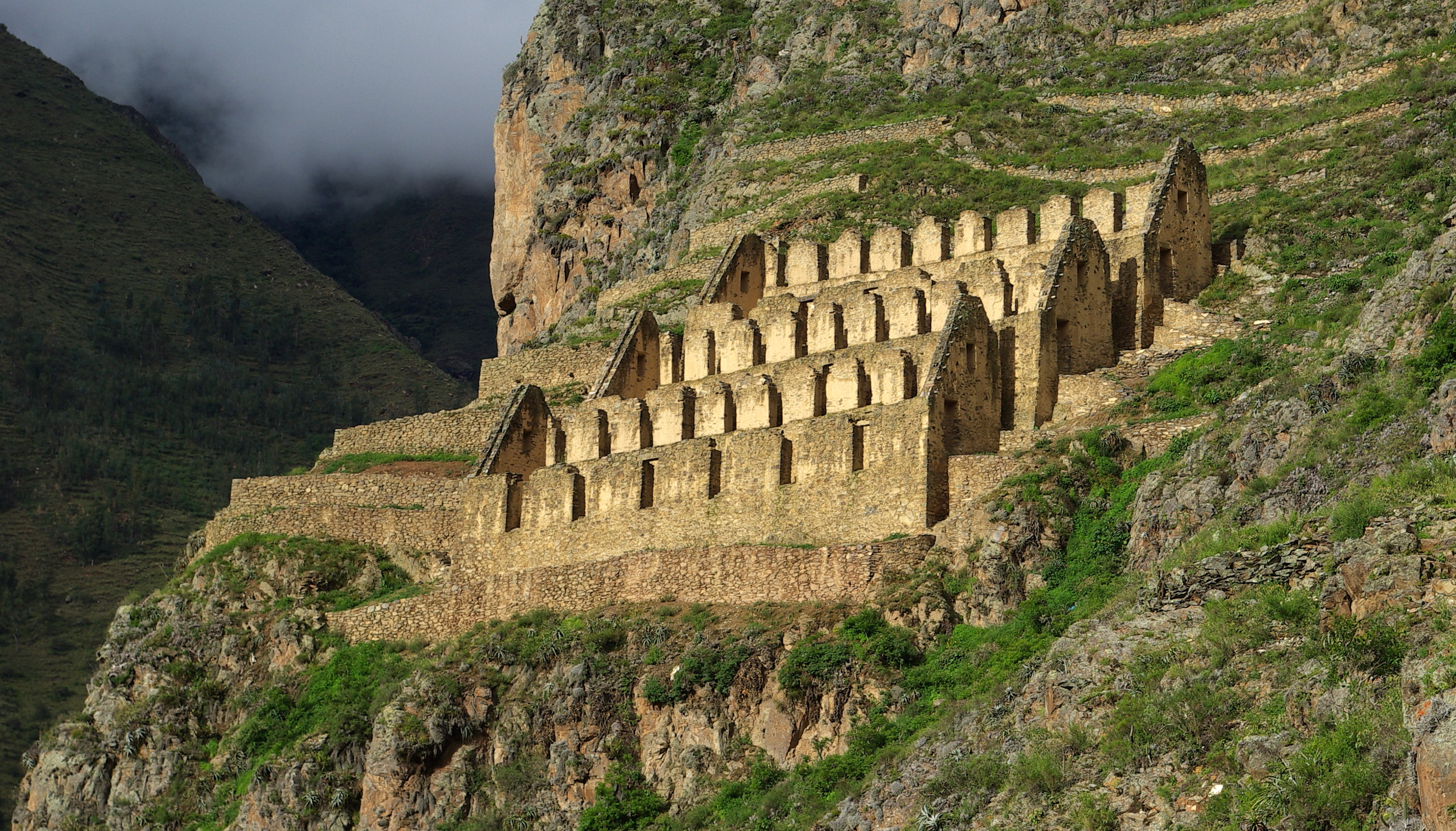
- Ruins of granaries on the hillside over Ollantaytambo.

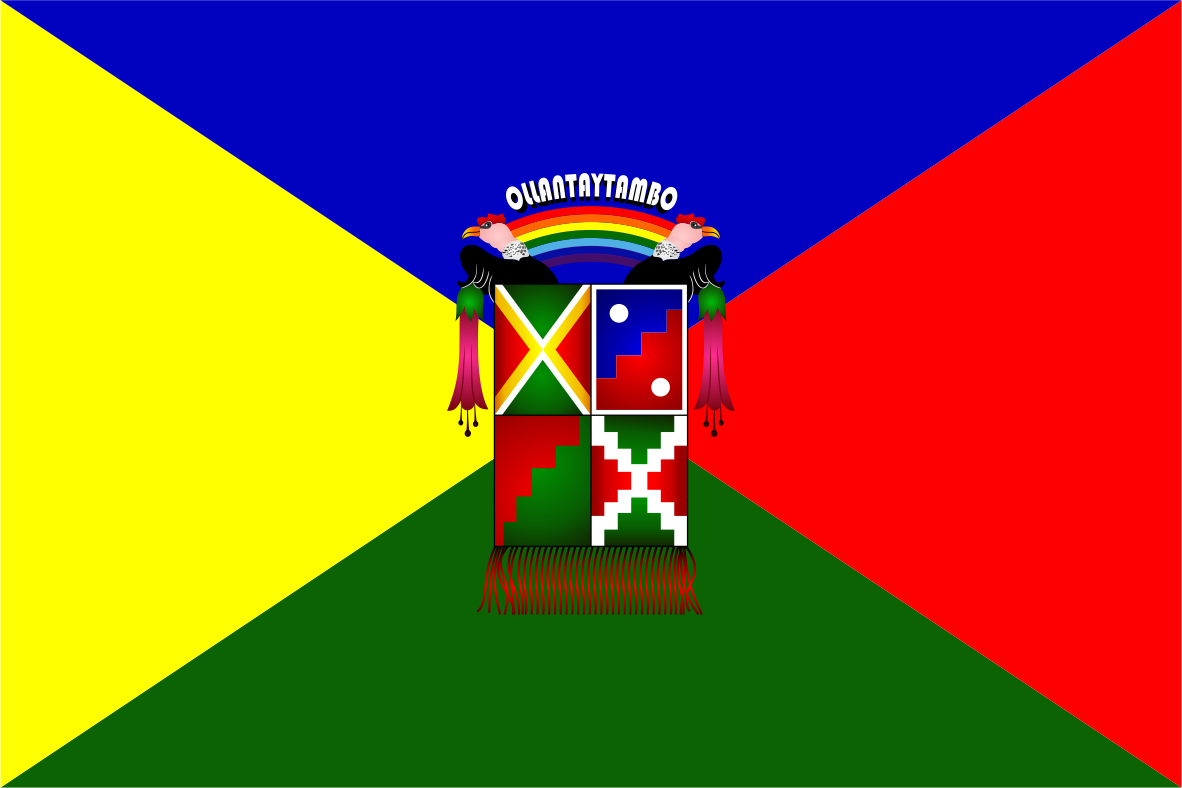
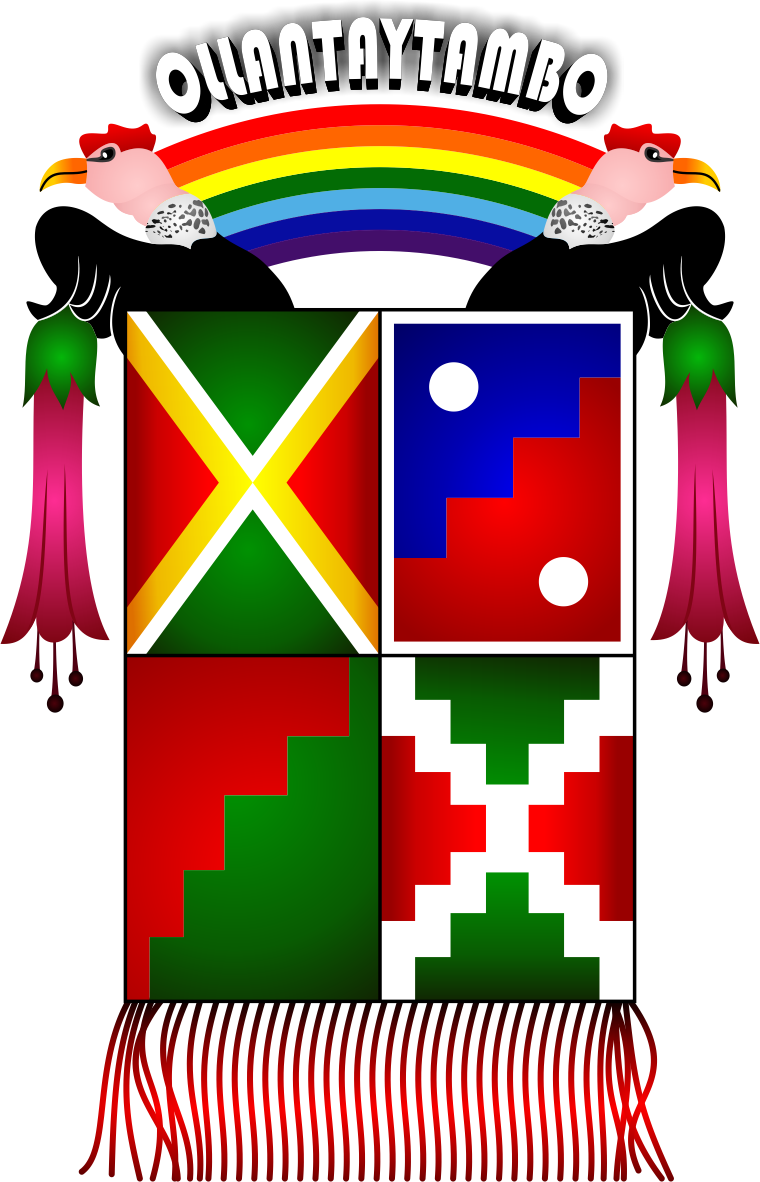
- Flag Coat of arms
- Interactive map of Ollantaytambo; Ullantaytampu
- Country: Peru
- Region: Cusco
- Province: Urubamba
- Founded: January 2, 1857
- Capital: Ollantaytambo

Government
  - Mayor: Jose Rios Coronel

Area
  - Total: 640.25 km^{2} (247.20 sq mi)
- Elevation: 2,846 m (9,337 ft)

Population (2025)
  - Total: 11,278
  - Density: 17.615/km^{2} (45.623/sq mi)
- Time zone: UTC-5 (PET)
- UBIGEO: 081306
- Website: muniollantaytambo.gob.pe

Ollantaytambo District is one of seven districts of Urubamba Province in Peru. The town of Ollantaytambo is the capital of the district.

== Geography ==
The Urupampa and Willkapampa mountain ranges traverse the district. The highest peak of the district is Sallqantay at 6,271 metres (20,574 ft). Other mountains are listed below:

- Anawillka Q'asa
- Llama Wasi
- Llawlliyuq
- Marquni
- Masanayuq
- Minasniyuq
- Muyuq
- Pata Kancha
- Pinkuylluna
- Qhispi Rumiyuq
- Q'illu Urqu
- Runtuqucha Q'asa
- Sallqayuq
- Tampu Mach'ay
- Uqhupampa
- Waqra Tanka
- Wamanripayuq
- Waqay Willka
- Wayanay
- Willka Wiqi
- Yana Urqu
- Yuraq Urqu

== Ethnic groups ==
The people in the district are mainly indigenous citizens of Quechua descent. Quechua is the language which the majority of the population (58.55%) learnt to speak in childhood, 38.74% of the residents started speaking using the Spanish language (2007 Peru Census).

== See also ==
- Inkapintay
- Kachi Qhata
- Kusichaka River
- Pumamarka
- Qurimarka
- Qusqu Qhawarina
- Willkaraqay
