= Salcayoc =

Mountain in Peru

- Location within Peru

Highest point
- Elevation: 4,838 m (15,873 ft)
- Coordinates: 13°10′39″S 72°13′09″W

Naming
- Language of name: Quechua

Geography
- Location: Peru, Cusco Region
- Parent range: Andes

Salcayoc (possibly from Quechua sallqa wild, -yuq a suffix) is a 4,838-metre-high (15,873 ft) mountain in the Urubamba mountain range in the Andes of Peru. It is located in the Cusco Region, Urubamba Province, Ollantaytambo District.
