= Cusichaca River =

River in Peru

Cusichaca
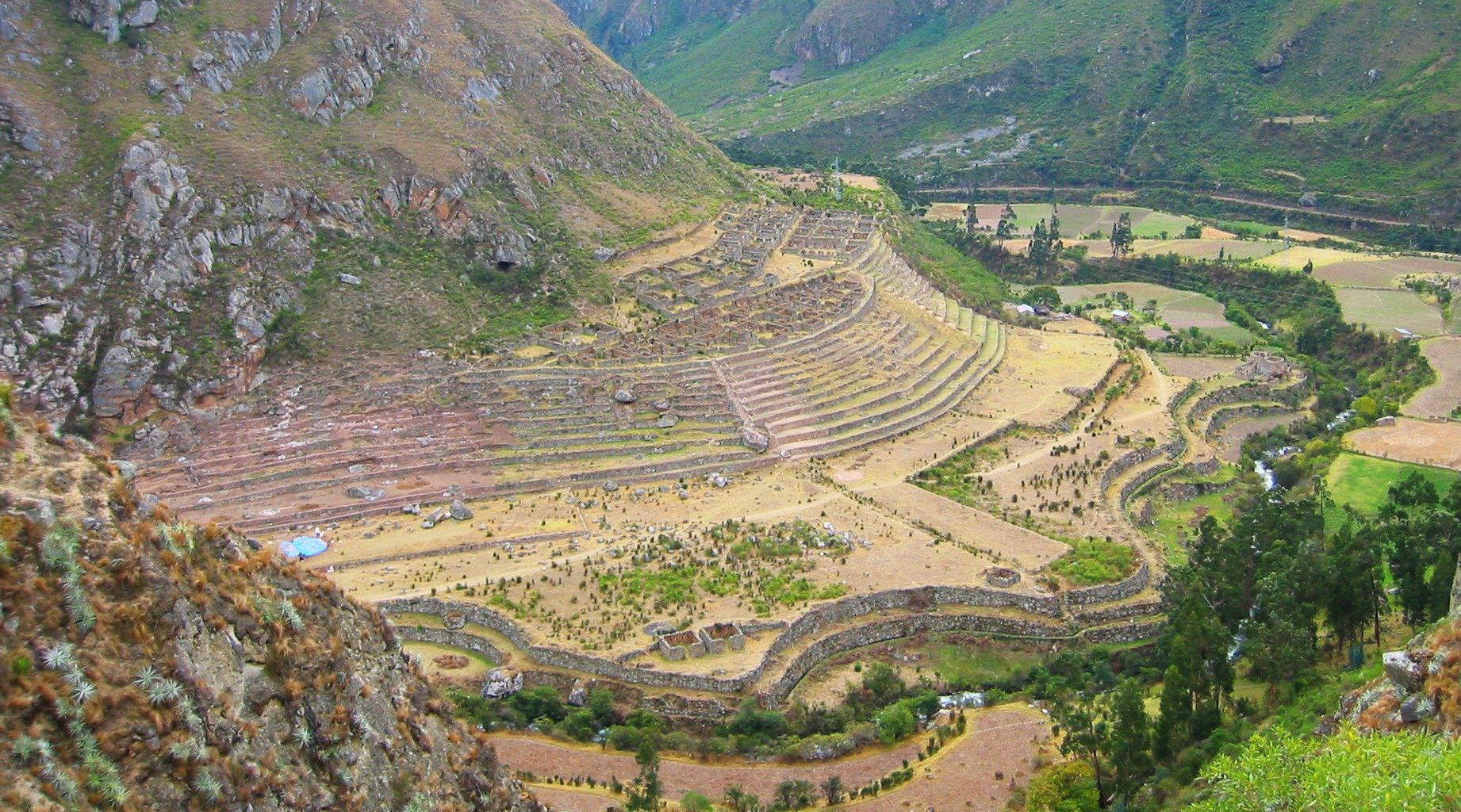
- Cusichaca River as it flows along Patallacta just before its confluence with the Vilcanota River (background)
- Etymology: Quechua

Location
- Country: Peru
- Region: Cusco Region

Physical characteristics
- Mouth: Vilcanota River

Basin features
- Tributaries
  - left: Chawpiwayq'u-Llulluch'apampa
  - right: Kiskamayu, Ch'urumayu

Cusichaca River (possibly from Quechua kusi delight, joy, happiness / merry, joyful, content, happy, chaka bridge, "joy bridge", or k'usi a cucurbit species, a small zucchini or Cucurbita pepo, "zucchini (or Cucurbita pepo) bridge"), is a river in Peru located in the Cusco Region, Urubamba Province, on the border of the districts Machupicchu and Ollantaytambo. Its waters flow to the Vilcanota River.

Cusichaca River originates in the Vilcabamba mountain range east of the mountain Salcantay, south of the Paljay and southwest of the Huayanay. Its direction is mainly to the northeast along the villages Pampacahuana, Churo, Paucarcancha, Ranrapata and Incachimpa.

Some of its little affluents are Llullucha River from the left and Churomayo and Quesjamayo from the right. Shortly before the Cusichaca River meets the Vilcanota River it flows along the archaeological site Patallacta. The confluence of the rivers is between the villages Qoriwayrachina and Pichanuyoc or Pinchaunuyoc.

The Cusichaca valley is an archaeologically important region in Peru, significant for the evidence that it has provided of Inca civilization. It was an agriculturally important part of the Inca Empire.

The valley has been the subject of intensive archaeological study over many years under the direction of Dr. Ann Kendall O.B.E., of the Cusichaca Trust. Since its inception the trust has evolved and now also works with highland farming communities in the rehabilitation of abandoned systems of irrigation canals and agricultural terraces, along with the revitalization of other traditional technologies. Throughout the 1980s and 1990s, numerous archaeological volunteers from Britain, Peru, North America and other countries worked on the Cusichaca Project and as a result it is one of the most comprehensively studied areas of Peru.

== See also ==
- Willkaraqay
