= Pinkuylluna =

Archaeological site in Peru

Coordinates: 13°15′22″S 72°15′40″W

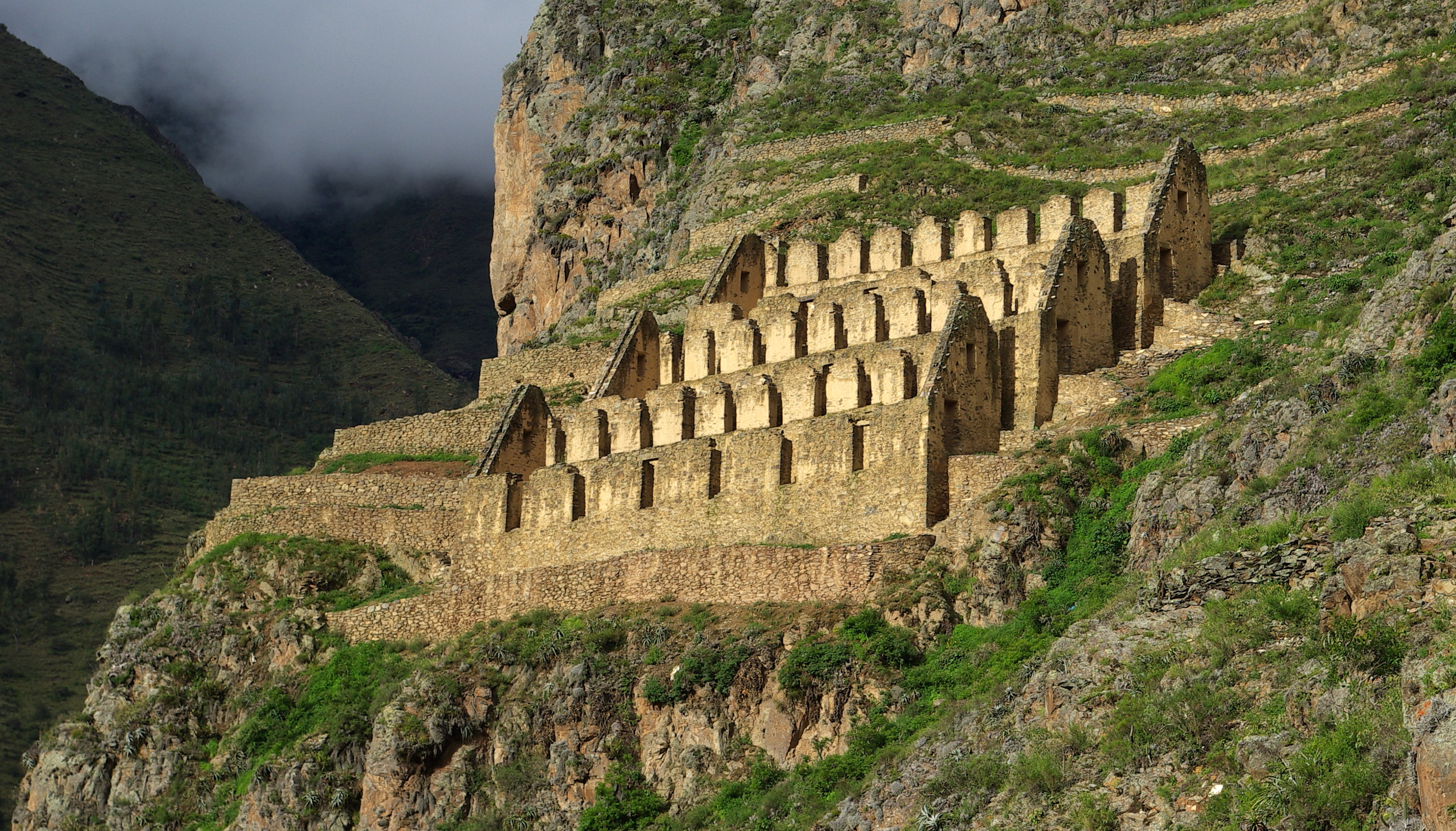
- The site Pinkuylluna
- Interactive map of Pinkuylluna
- Cultures: Inca
- Location: Peru
- Region: Cusco Region
- Part of: Ollantaytambo Archaeological Park

Pinkuylluna or Pinkulluna (Quechua, Hispanicized spellings Pincuylluna, Pinculluna) is an archaeological site on a mountain of the same name in Peru located in the Cusco Region, Urubamba Province, Ollantaytambo District.

It is situated between the rivers Patakancha (Patacancha) and Willkanuta, northeast of the town Ollantaytambo.

== Etymology ==
The name "Pinkuylluna" derives from the Pinkuyllu, a type of flute found throughout the Andes. It is unknown if literal Pinkuyllu were played at the site, as the name may be a reference to the prominent local mountain winds.

== Gallery ==
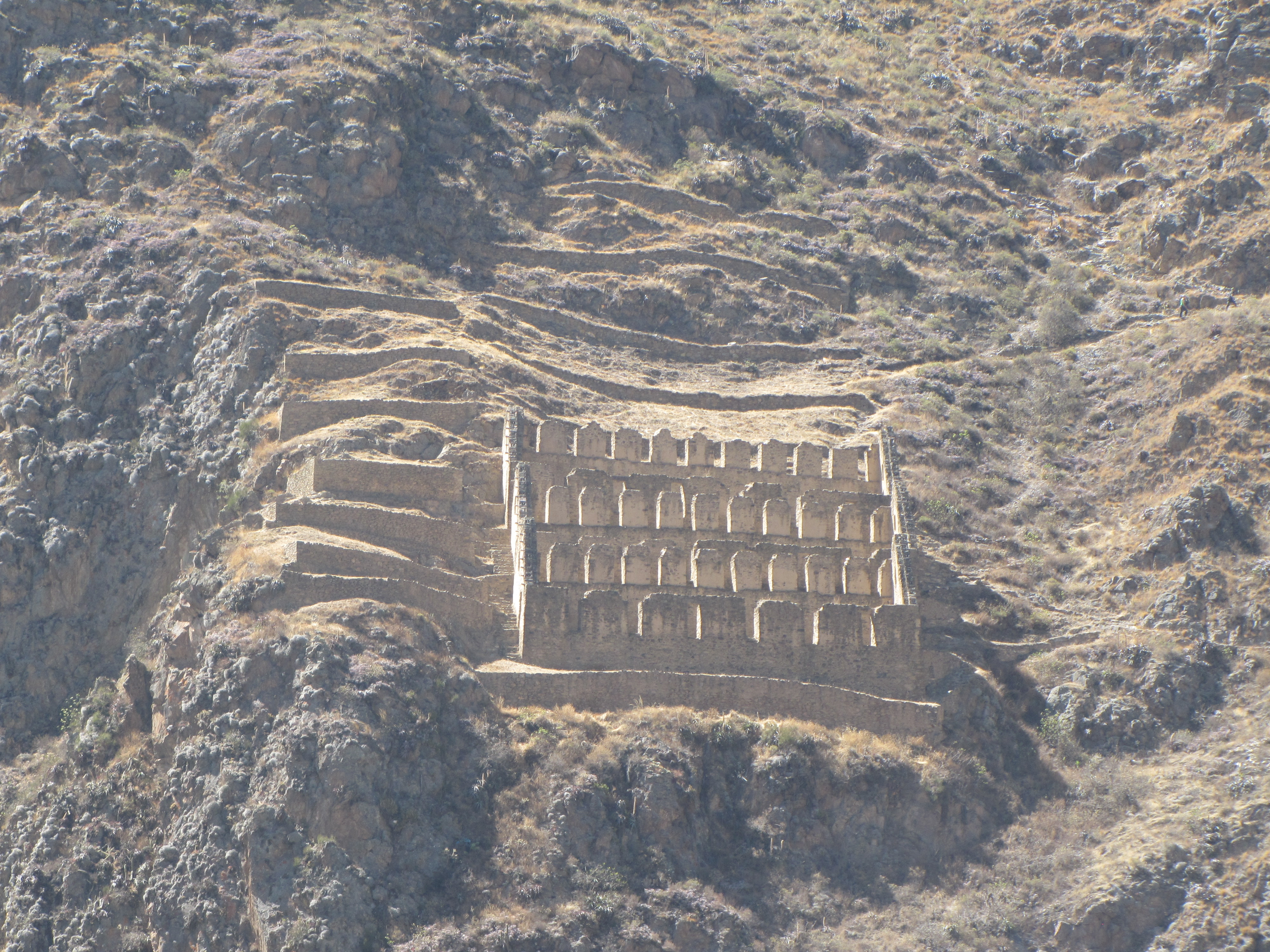
Pinkuylluna ruins

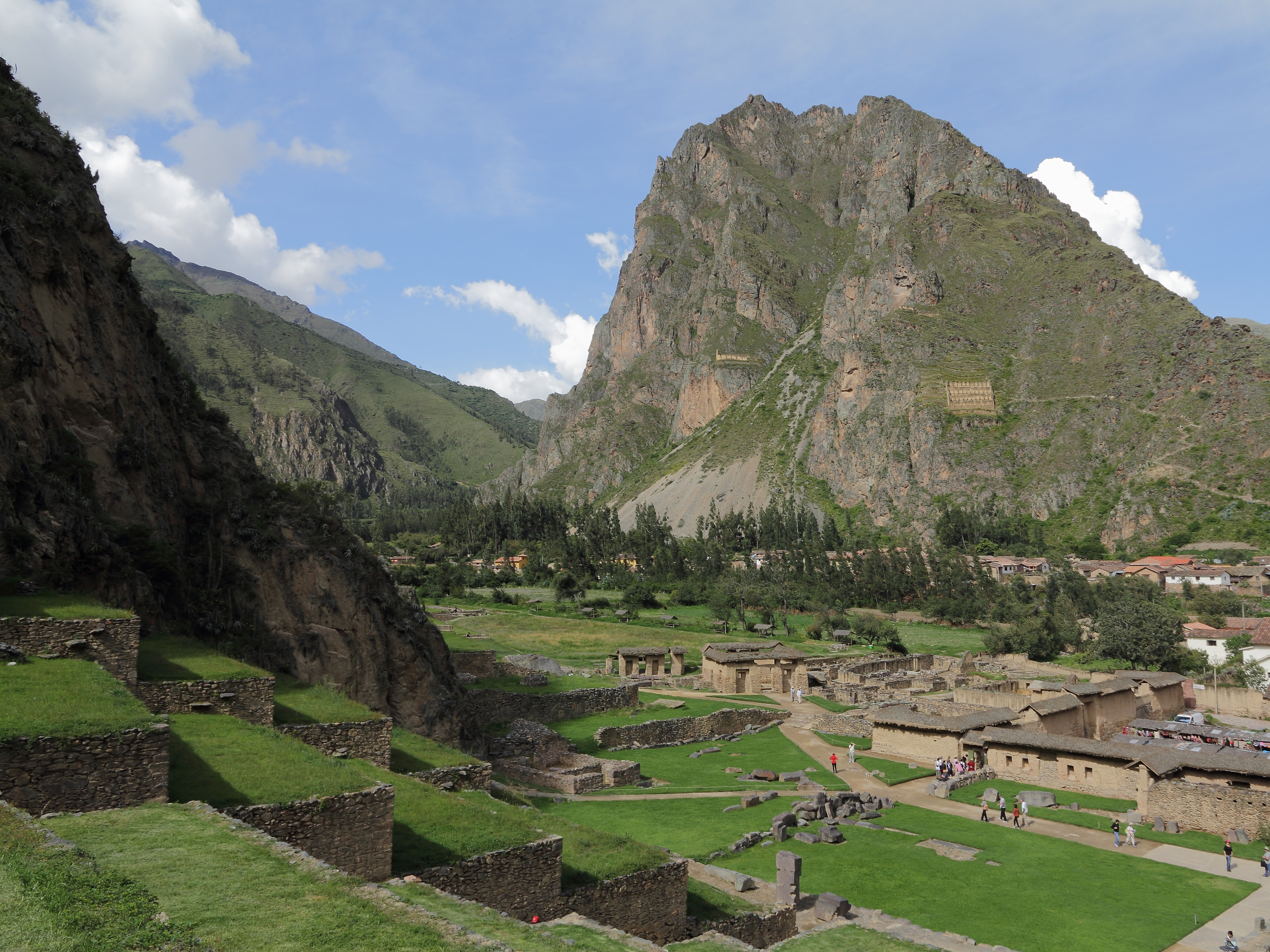
The mountain Pinkuylluna (on the right) above the town Ollantaytambo. A huge face of stone is visible beside the Pinkuylluna ruins.

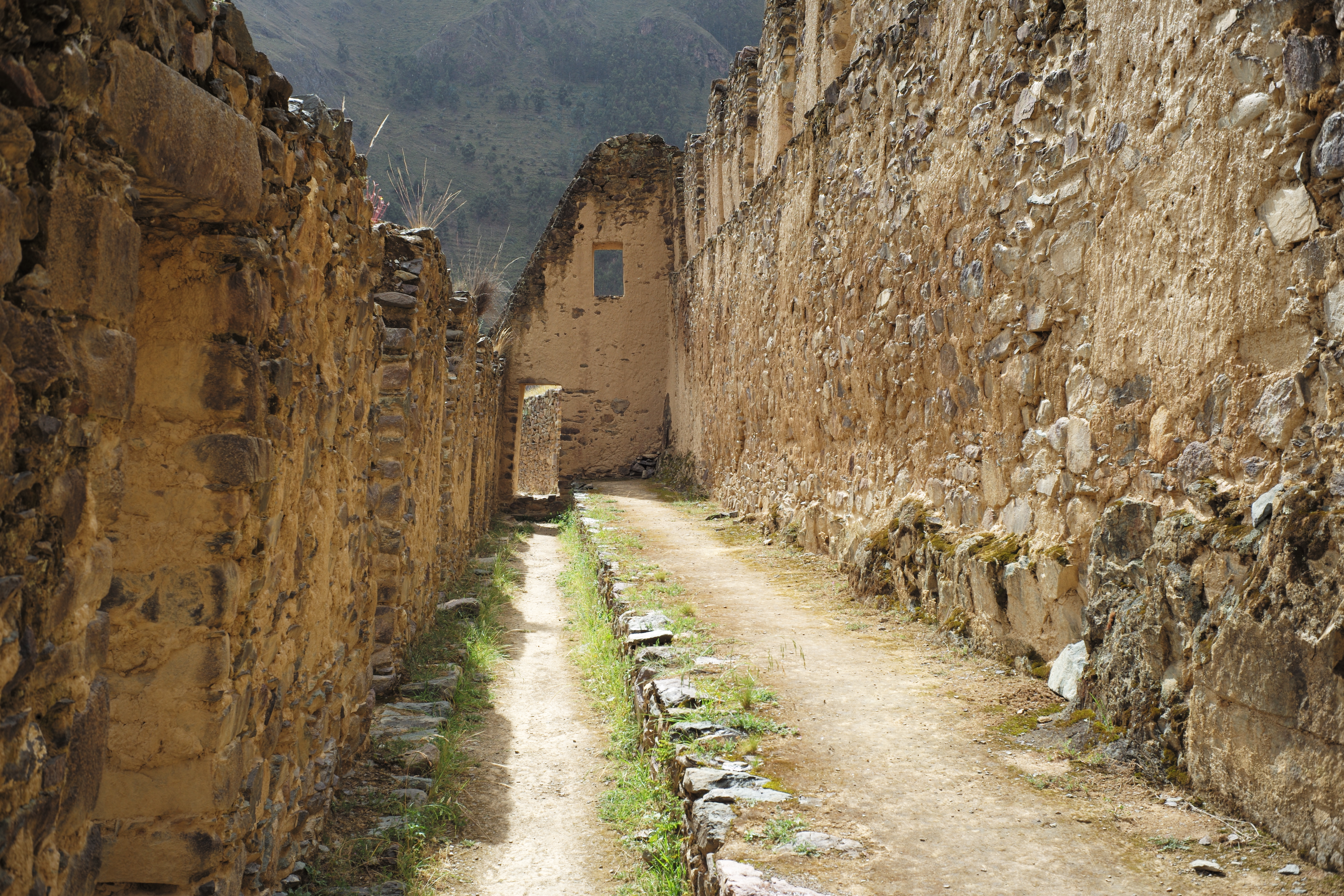
Interior of the central store room.

== See also ==
- List of archaeological sites in Peru
