= Mount Huayanay =

Mountain in Peru

Huayanay
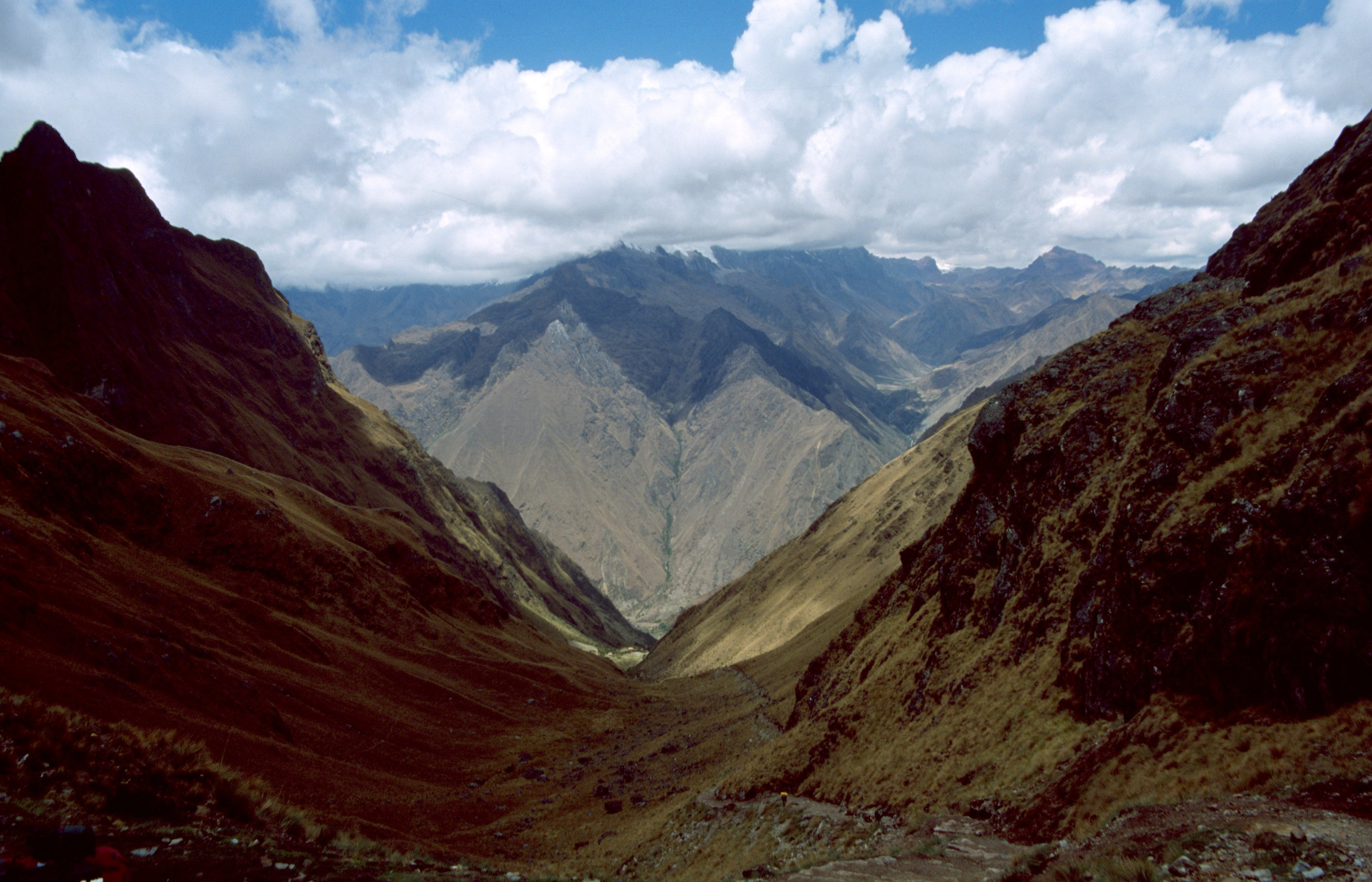
- Huayanay in the clouds as seen from the Warmi Wañusqa mountain pass

Highest point
- Elevation: 5,464 m (17,927 ft)
- Coordinates: 13°17′54″S 72°23′35″W

Naming
- English translation: swallow
- Language of name: Quechua

Geography
- Location within Peru
- Location: Cusco, Peru
- Parent range: Andes, Vilcabamba

Climbing
- First ascent: 1-1966 via N. ridge.

Huayanay (Quechua for swallow) is a mountain and a massif in the Vilcabamba mountain range in the Andes of Peru, about 5,464 metres (17,927 ft) high. The massif is located in the Cusco Region, Anta Province, Huarocondo District and in the Urubamba Province, Ollantaytambo District. Huayanay lies east of Salcantay and Paljay.
