= Inca complex at Písac =

Archaeological site in Cusco, Peru

Písac
- Pisaq
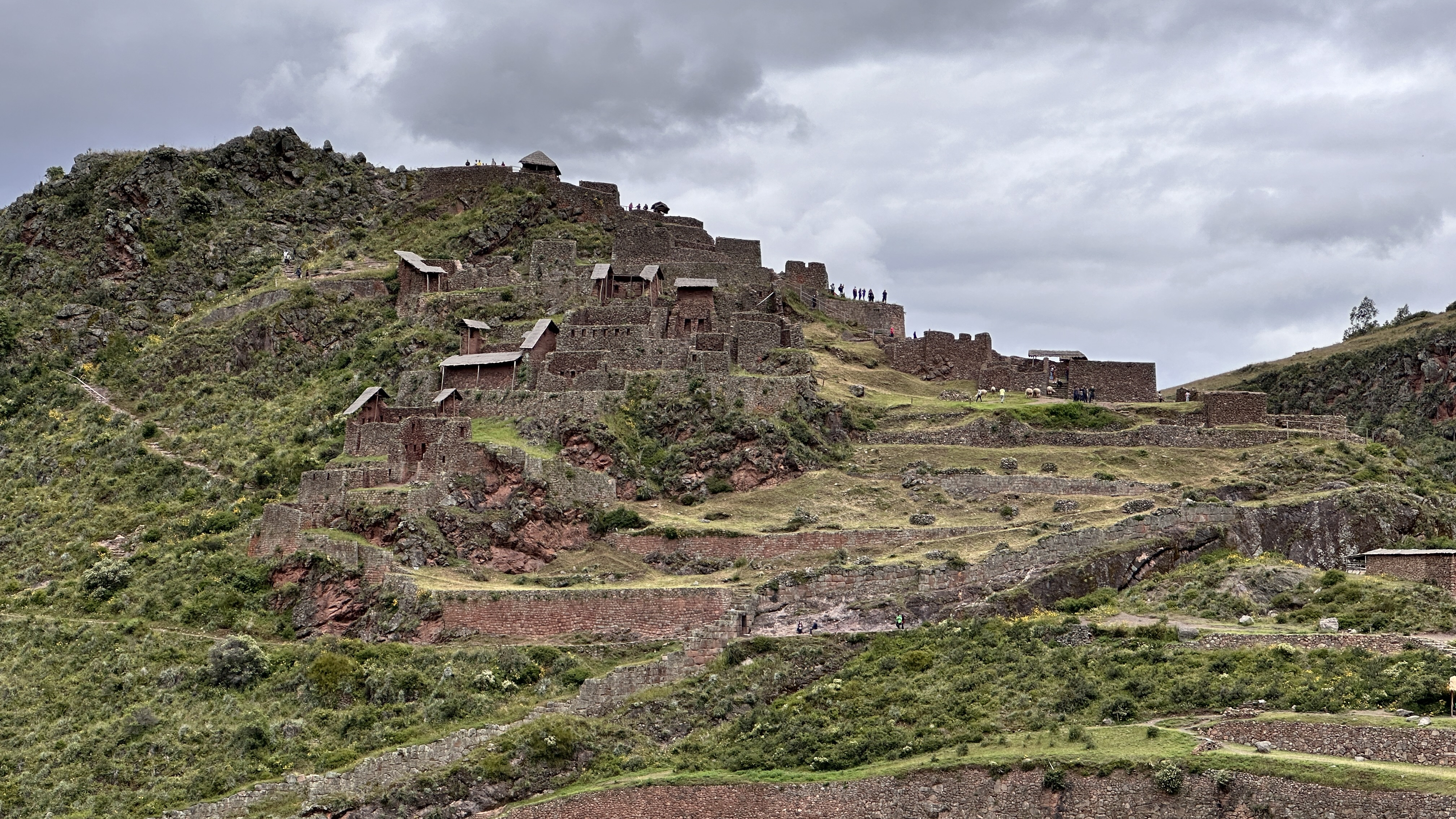
- View of some of the Písac ruins, specifically Q’alla Q’asa, thought to be the residential buildings for guards stationed at Písac when it was a fort.

- Map showing location of the Písac's Inca complex in Peru
- Interactive map of Písac
- 13°24′47″S 71°50′37″W
- Type: Fortification
- Cultures: Inca
- Location: Cusco Region, Peru

History
- Built: c. 1450

Site notes
- Area: 65.5 ha (162 acres)

Cultural Heritage of Peru
- Official name: Parque Arqueológico de Pisaq
- Type: Immovable tangible
- Designated: 17 May 2002; 24 years ago
- Legal basis: R.D.N. Nº 429/INC

The Inca complex at Pisac is a large Incan complex of agricultural terraces, residences, guard posts, watchtowers and a ceremonial/religious centre located along a mountain ridge above the modern town of Pisac in the Sacred Valley of Peru. In 1983 the Pisac National Archeological Park was established to recognize the importance of and to protect the remains of the complex.

== History ==
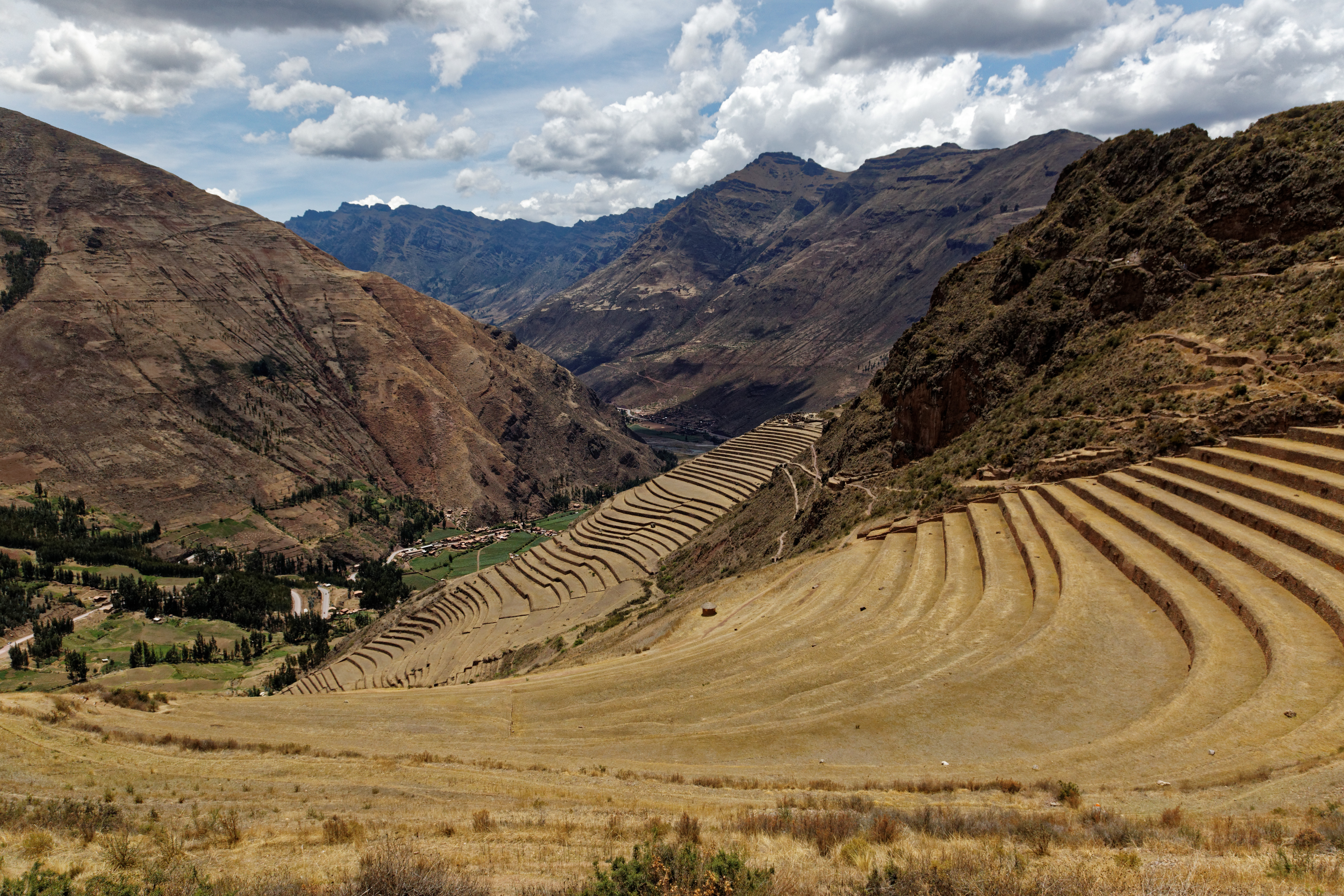
View of the andenes (terraces) from the ruins of Pisac

The remains of Lucre and Killke pottery that have been found in the area suggest that the location has been occupied for some time.

An early settlement, which probably pre-dated the Inca, existed on the hillside between the Quitamayo and Chongo tributaries of the Vilcanota river. The community raised their crops on terraces as well as on the flood plain. Later as the threats from other tribes declined the villagers moved closer to the main road to Cusco and Urcos.

It is unknown when the complex that remains today was built, but the consensus is that the contributions by the Incas were built by the Inca emperor Pachacuti (1438–1471/1472) no earlier than 1440.

Despite the excellent condition of many of the structures, little is conclusively known about the site's actual purpose. Some researchers believe that while Choquequirao defended the western entrance, and Ollantaytambo the northern, Pisac defended the southern entrance to the Sacred Valley. Its location controlled a route which connected the Inca Empire with the border of the rain forest and so could protect Cusco from possible attacks by the Antis (a collective Inca term for the many varied fierce ethnic groups such as the Asháninka and Tsimané) who lived in the Antisuyu region (the eastern part of the Inca empire), present day Pachacutec and the Manu jungle.

The site was certainly an observatory and religious site, and although it was reinforced with the ramparts of a massive citadel, the Incas never retreated here to defend their empire against the Spaniards. When Manco Inca rebelled against the Spanish in 1534, he took up a position first at Calco, 18 km (11 miles) farther downstream, before retreating to Ollantaytambo. This indicates that he considered Pisac to have been simply too close to Cusco.

Today the consensus among many scholars (among them Kim MacQuarrie) is that Pachacuti constructed it as multi-purpose residence, citadel, observatory and religious site. In this role it would support his panaca (family and descendants), provide a secluded royal retreat located well away from Cusco where he and the nobility could relax between military campaigns, undertake ritual and religious ceremonies, serve as a refuge in times of danger as well as commemorating his victories over the Cuyos. In addition to Pisac the other royal estates that Pachacuti is considered to have established were Ollantaytambo and Machu Picchu (conquest of the Vilcabamba Valley). The Cuyos had been implicated in a conspiracy to kill Pachacuti, which was put down so ruthlessly that most of the Cuyos were killed.

Despite its size and proximity to Cusco, the Inca complex was not mentioned by any of the Spanish chroniclers.

The modern town of Písac was built in the valley below the ruins of the Inca complex by Viceroy Toledo during the 1570s.

The first modern description of the Inca complex occurred in the late 19th century when Ephraim George Squier (1821-1888), the US Commissioner to Peru visited Pisac and left a detailed description of the Inca ruins in his 1877 book Peru - Incidents of Travel and Exploration in the Land of the Incas. In his book Squier offered the following introduction to the complex:

Let us imagine a bold headland of mountain, projecting out from the great snowy masses of the Andes, an irregular oval in shape, three miles long, and at its most elevated point four thousand feet high. It is separated by gorge and valley from the parent mountains, except at one point, where it subsides into a relatively low and narrow ridge, scarcely a hundred paces broad. It is rough and forbidding in outline, here running up into splintered peaks, yonder presenting to the valley enormous beetling cliffs, and here and there holding open, level spaces and gentle slopes in its rocky embrace. Except at three points it is absolutely inaccessible. Two of these are on the side towards the valley of Yucay, which it was mainly designed to defend; and the third is at the narrow neck or ridge connecting it with the parent mountain.

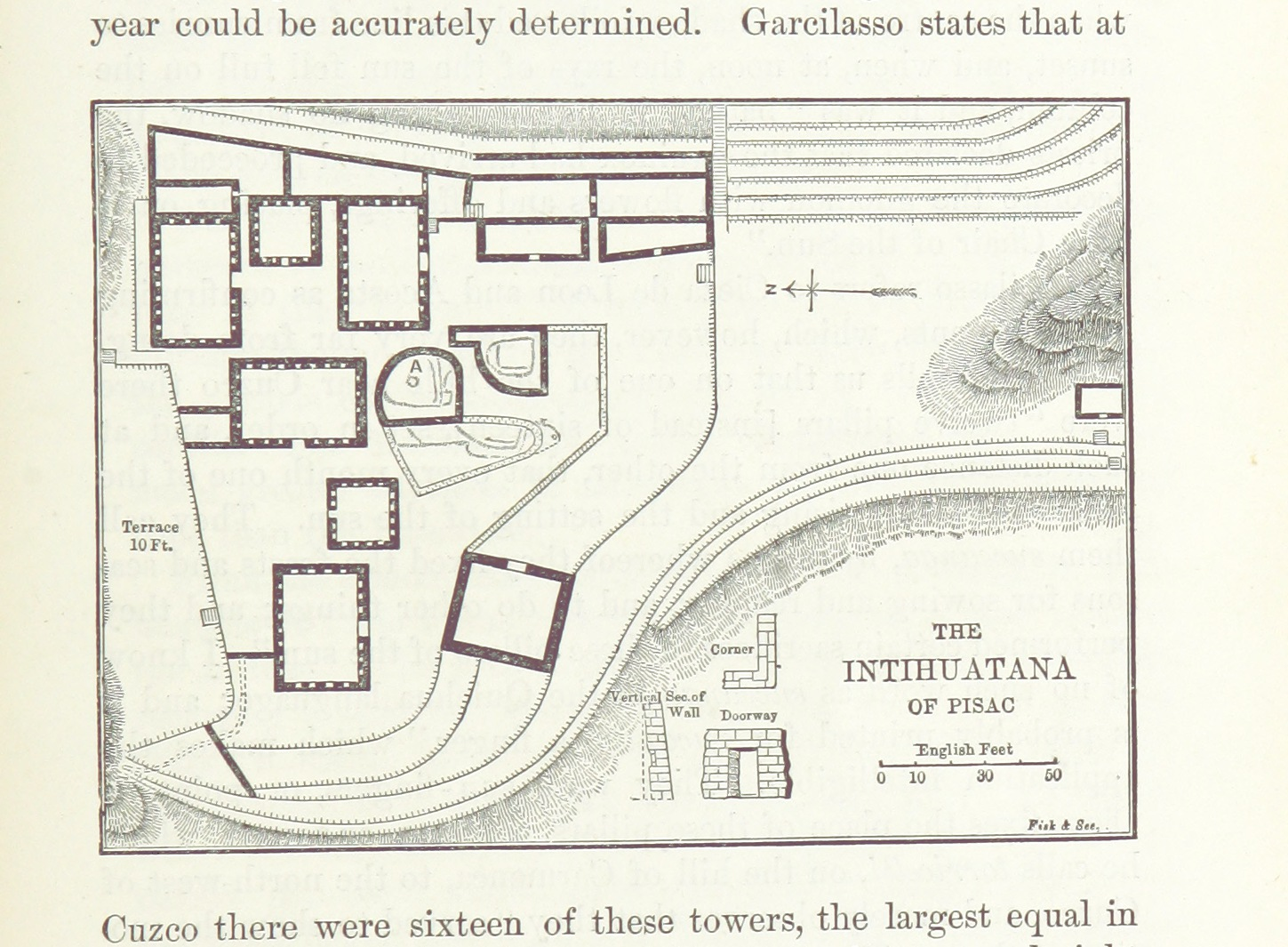
Plan of the Intihuatana of Pisac (1877)

Squier's book did much to bring the complex to the attention of the English-speaking world. The Austrian-French scientist-explorer Charles Wiener also visited Písac and wrote an account of his explorations in Perou et Bolivie (Paris, 1880).

On 12 February 2016, 10-year old Valeria Arlette Garcia Escobar was killed by a rock fall while exploring the complex with her Peruvian family. It is believed that heavy rains the night before, coupled with strong sunshine may have loosened the rocks. Two other family members were injured. The area of the accident was not near any Inca structures and lead to the closing of the Pisaq Archaeological Parks until 1 September 2016 following repairs.

Celebrations are held annually on 24 August at the complex in honour of Willka Raymi.

=== Establishment of the archaeological park ===
The site was first protected when in response to the inclusion of Machu Picchu and Cusco on the UNESCO World Heritage List Law 23765 was drawn up, declaring the archaeological parks of Ollantaytambo, Písac, Piquillaqta and Tipon and other archaeological sites in the Sacred Valley part of the cultural heritage of the nation. The law was unanimously approved by the Legislative Chambers meeting on 15 December 1983 and promulgated by the Executive on 30 December of that year. The area that the Písac archaeological park covered was subsequently defined on 17 May 2002 by National Directive Resolution No. 429-2002.

The park covers 9,063 hectares.

== Description ==
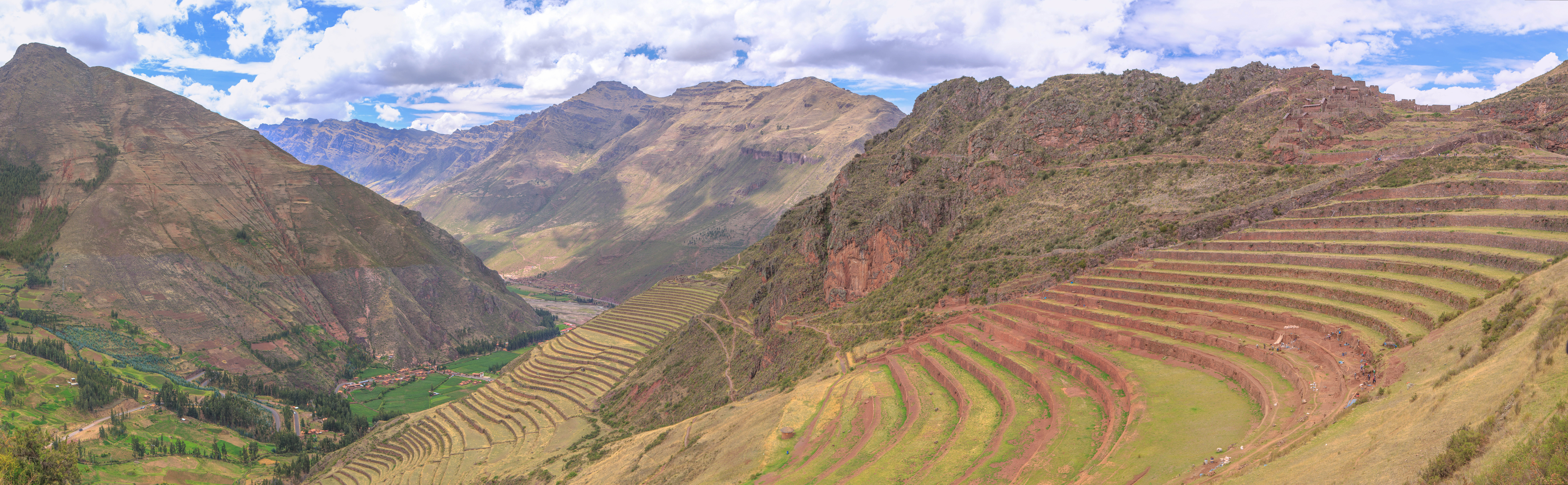
Panoramic view of Písac

Located at the entrance to the Sacred Valley the Incan complex stretches at varying elevations between 3,446 m and 3,514 metres above sea level for approximately one kilometre along a mountain ridge sandwiched between the Kitamayu River (to the west) and the Chongo River (to the east), which are tributaries of the Vilcanota.

The complex is divided into seven architectural areas (from north to south) - Qantus Raqay, Qallaq'asa, Inca Qonqorina, Intiwatana, P'isaqa, Hospitalniyoc and Kanchis Racay. These are separated by natural terrain but accessible by narrow paths wind tortuously along the ridge and in two places passing through two tunnels with running water supplied by canals. Almost all the original names of the different areas of the complex are lost; the names that are known today were established by tradition, historians and archaeologists.

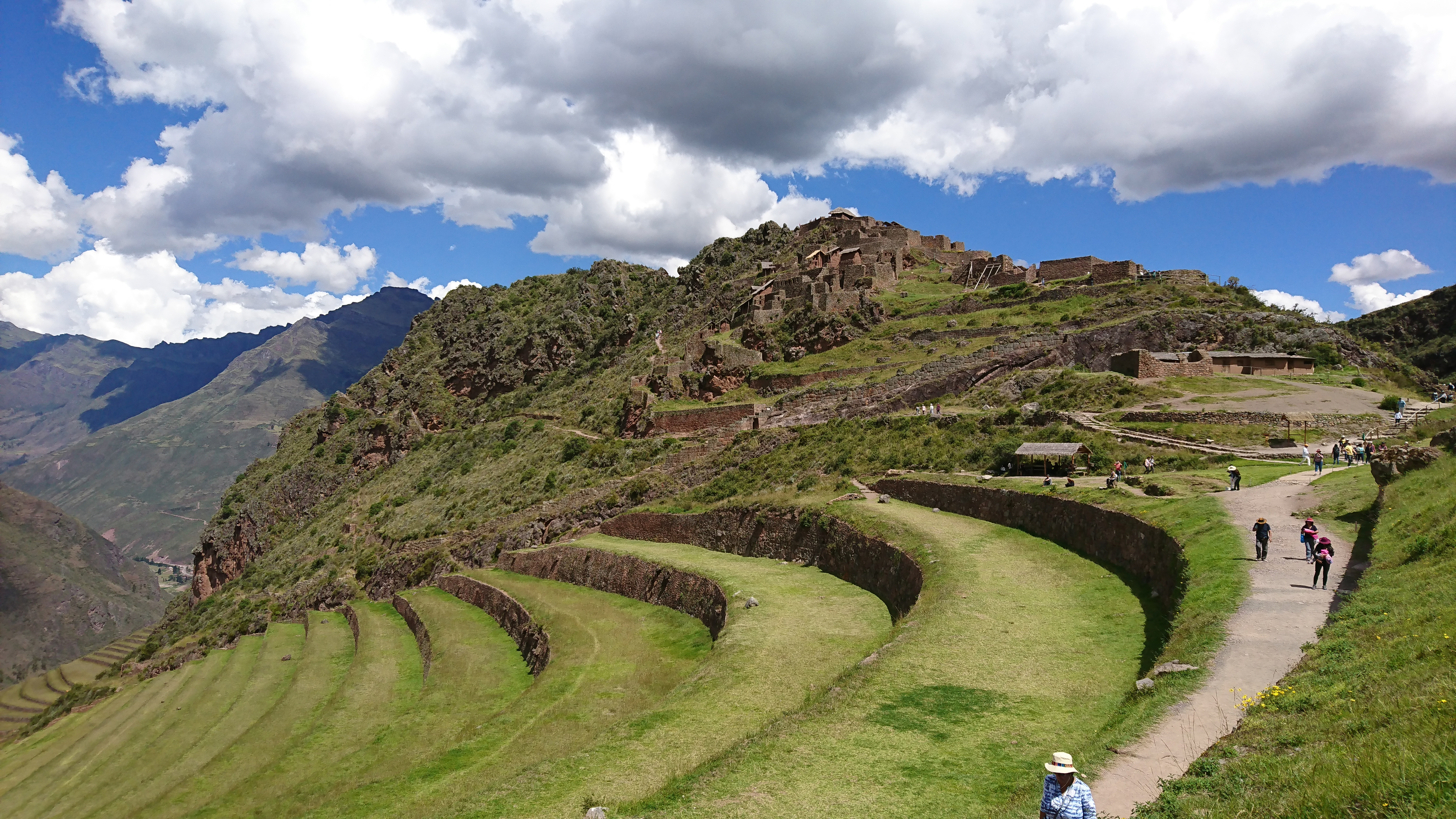
Entrance of the complex

The first part of the complex reached by visitors coming by motor vehicle is Qanchus Racay in the north-eastern corner of the complex. South of Qanchus Racay is the first of the numerous terraces (andenes) while on a plateau to the west beside the Kitamayu River is a bath complex containing four purification baths.

On the opposite bank of the Kitamayu River on an irregular almost vertical mountain slope is the T'antana Marka, which is home to the looted tombs of the biggest pre-Hispanic cemetery in the region.

Southwards of the bath complex on the steep slopes of a hill is the Qallaq'asa, a residential area which contains homes and storehouses. According to some sources this is also known as Hanam P'isaq (Upper Písac).

From this point there are three routes south. One continues along a path along the western side of the ridge above the Kitamayu River to the Tianayoc from which via a 3-metre long tunnel is reached the Inca Qonqorina, which is an administration area. Below it is the complex's ceremonial-religious area whose main feature is the Intiwatana (in Qechua, the tie of the sun, also known as an Intihuatana).

The second route drops down the eastern slope to the base of the Qallaq'asa and then continues southwards across the hillside and through a trapezoidal doorway called Amaru Punku (serpent gate, Qechua etymology) in a partial wall and then via a 16-metre long tunnel hollowed from the rock to connect with the path leading from the Tianayoc to the Intiwatana. The third path descends further down the southern side of the large terrace and then passes through a doorway with no lintel before heading southwards around the eastern side hillside to where the path branches either up to the Intiwatana or straight to the P'isaqa area.

From the Intiwatana a path beginning at its southeast corner drops down to the P'isaqa area that has a somewhat semi-circular shape following the mountain's silhouette. From the P'isaqa area there is also a path that descends partly down the hillside to the Kanchis Racay area, which consists of only a couple of structures.

From the Intiwatana a path runs southwards along the top of the ridge to watch towers (pucaras) in the Coriwayrachina area and storehouses (qullqas) in the Hospitalniyoc area. The path then descends through an area of steep terracing that reaches as far as the edge of precipices to merge with a path from P'isaqa. From this junction the path crosses over the ridge crest and descends though more agricultural terraces, filling the narrow valley of the Kitamayu River to eventually connect with a wide stone path that goes to the town.

If the lowest terraces on which Patapatayoc and the town of Písac are located are included then the entire complex covers 65.5 hectares. If only the terraces and buildings that cover the upper part, then the size of the complex reduces to 24 hectares, of which the seven architectural complexes occupy a total of 4.3 hectares.

The site is home to several suspension bridges. One was at Paccháyoc where the bases still exist. And the other was located on the western side of the Intiwatana area.

=== Coriwayrachina area ===
This area, whose name means "gold sifter", is on the ridge south of the Intiwatana and is home to several towers (Pucaras) used for communication or observation, and some very steep terraces probably used for defense.

=== Hospitalniyoc area ===
On the eastern slope below the Coriwayrachina in what is known as the Hospitalniyoc area are six storehouses (qullqas, also spelt as colca, collca, qolca, qollca, qollqa) of equal size and constructed of adobe. Qullqas were often built in groups or blocks and could be rectangular (as at Písac) or round, but all had only a single room. They are often situated on hillsides and located so that they are mostly in the shade, while the higher altitude ensured that they had good ventilation and lower temperatures, which protected their perishable contents against decay. Under-flooring and drainage canals were additional aids in keeping the interior atmosphere dry and allowed for the storage of goods such as grain and potatoes for two years or more.

=== Inca Qonqorina area ===
This is an administration area on the ridge just above the Intiwatana.

=== Intiwatana area ===
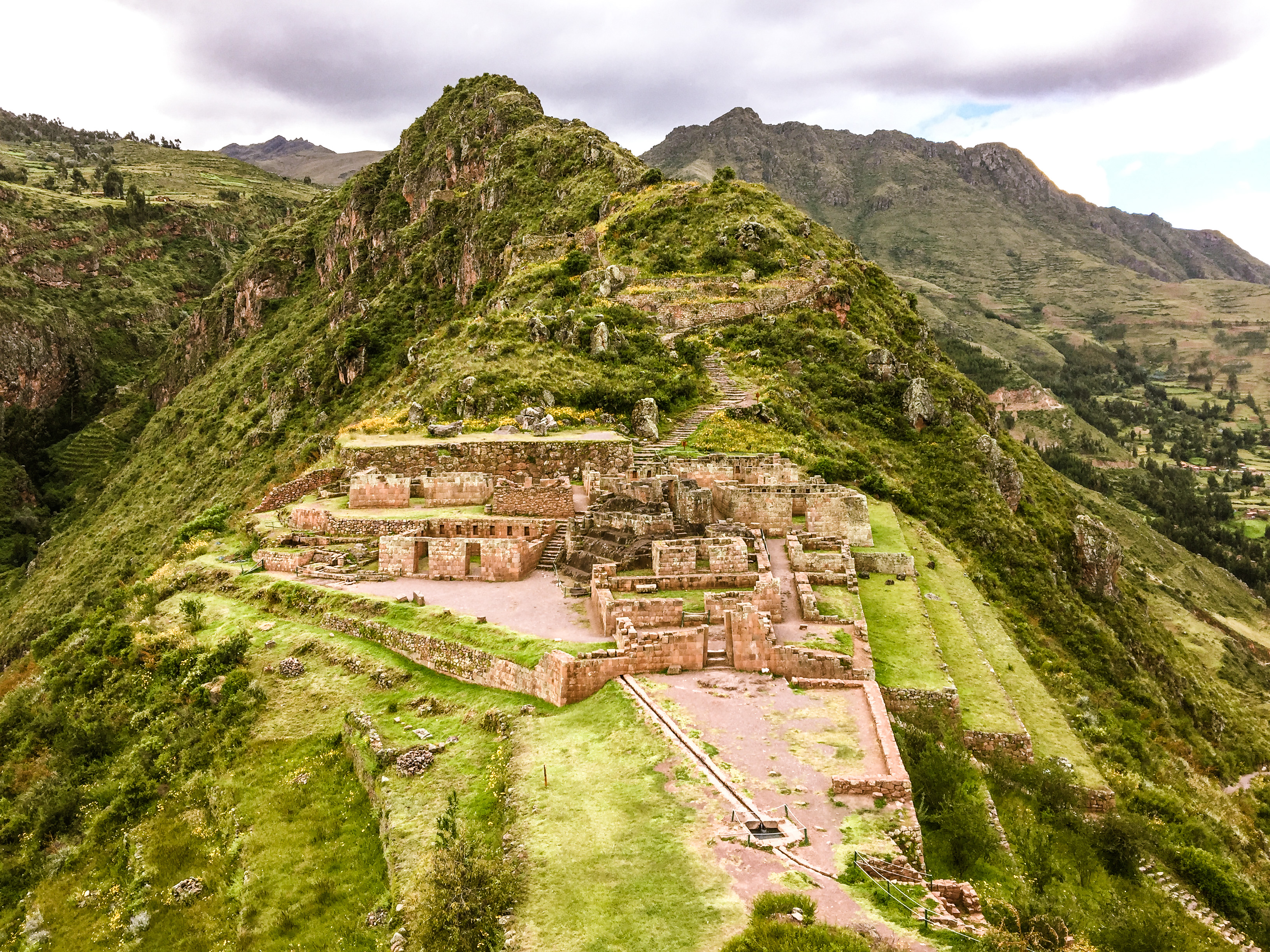
Intiwatana of Písac

Located on a small ridge with panoramic views on both sides, is the complex's ceremonial and religious area, which is generally referred to as the Intiwatana or Intihuatana area due to the presence in its centre of an Intiwatana. This is a carved ritual rock whose name is taken to mean "hitching-post of the Sun" in English. Intihuatana is a Hispanicized spelling of the Quechua word Intiwatana which means inti (sun), watana (fastener). The Intiwatana is housed in a semi-circular building similar to the letter "D", with one lateral straight wall which main gate is toward the south is built of perfectly fitted blocks of the finest pink granite. It is believed to have been used as an astronomical observatory to track the sun's movements in particular to determine the arrival of important growing seasons. On 21 June, the sun rises precisely above the peak to the east and above another on the 21 December. The carved rock was damaged by the Spanish who wanted to wipe out the indigenous belief system. This section is now closed to the public, due to vandals who destroyed part of it a few years ago.

The building housing the Intiwatana is surrounded by five other buildings, one of which is believed to have been devoted to worship of the moon. In front of the Intiwatana is a sacred chakana (Inca cross). There are also several ceremonial baths which discharge into an underground canal.

The walls of five other temples surround the Intiwatana, including one that was probably devoted to worship of the moon. In front of the Intiwatana is a sacred chacana (Inca cross).

=== Pisaq'a ===
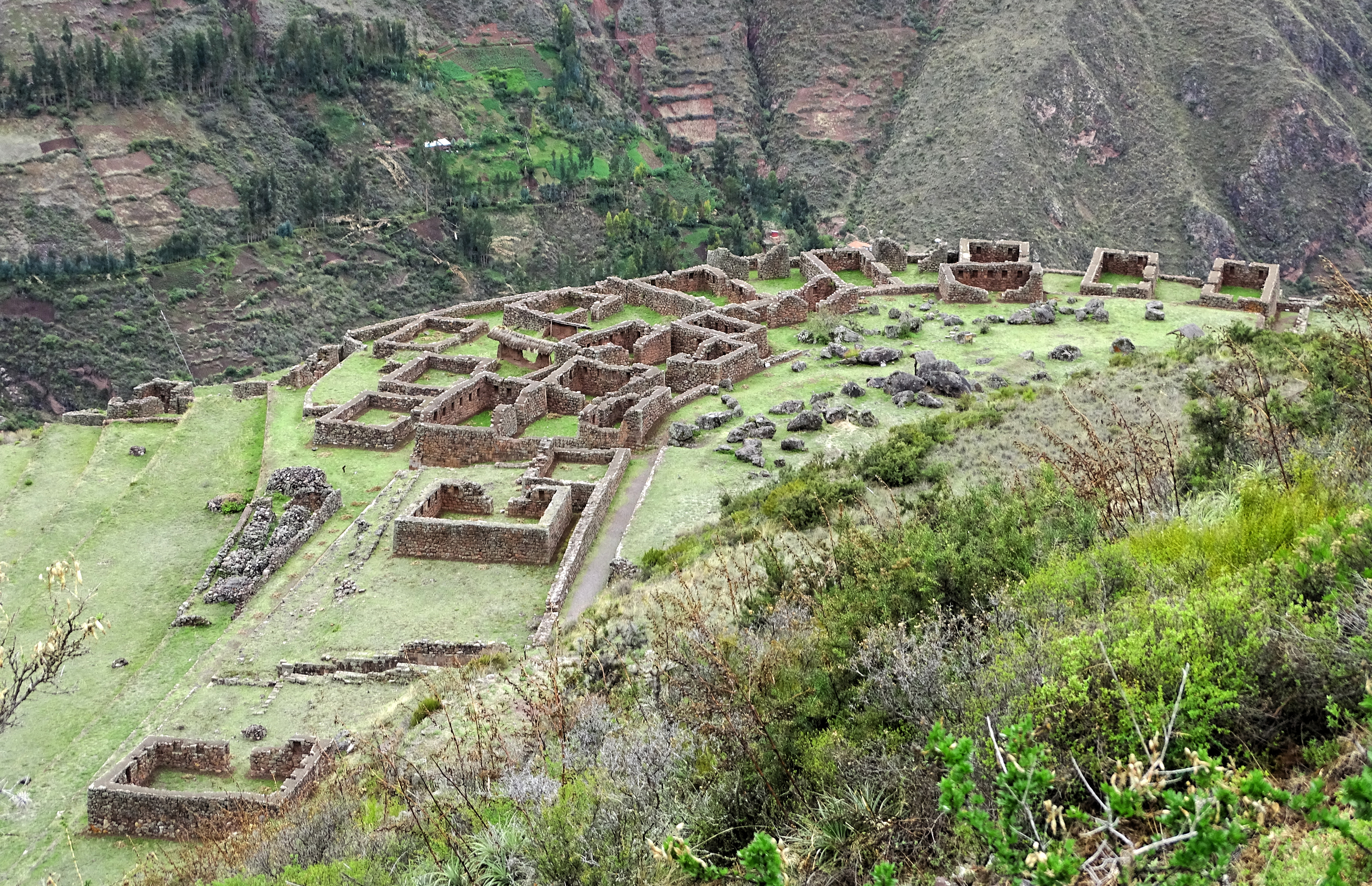
Residential area

Located 200 metres and directly below the Intiwatana on a large semi-circular ledge is this residential area of 30 or so buildings. As well as its own baths it has finer brick work than the other residential areas, indicating that it was the home of the elite.

=== Protective wall ===
A large wall built of large dressed stones pierced by four gateways, protects the northern base of the Qallaq'asa area. The only one that still retains its lintel is on a path that leads to southwards to the Intiwatana and the elite residential area of P'isaqa. It is known by the name of Amaru Punku, which comes from the Quechua words amaru (snake), and punk (doorway) hence the common English translation of "door of the serpent". The hinges are still visible.

=== Qallaq'asa area ===
The name of the Qallaq'asa residential area which is 3,514 metres (11,529 ft) above sea level comes from the Quechua words q'alla (cut) and q'asa (pass), in reference to a tunnel that connects it with the Intiwatana. Cascading down the side of the hill its 23 buildings are built from rough field stone, stuck together with adobe, indicating that they were probably inhabited by lower-status workers.

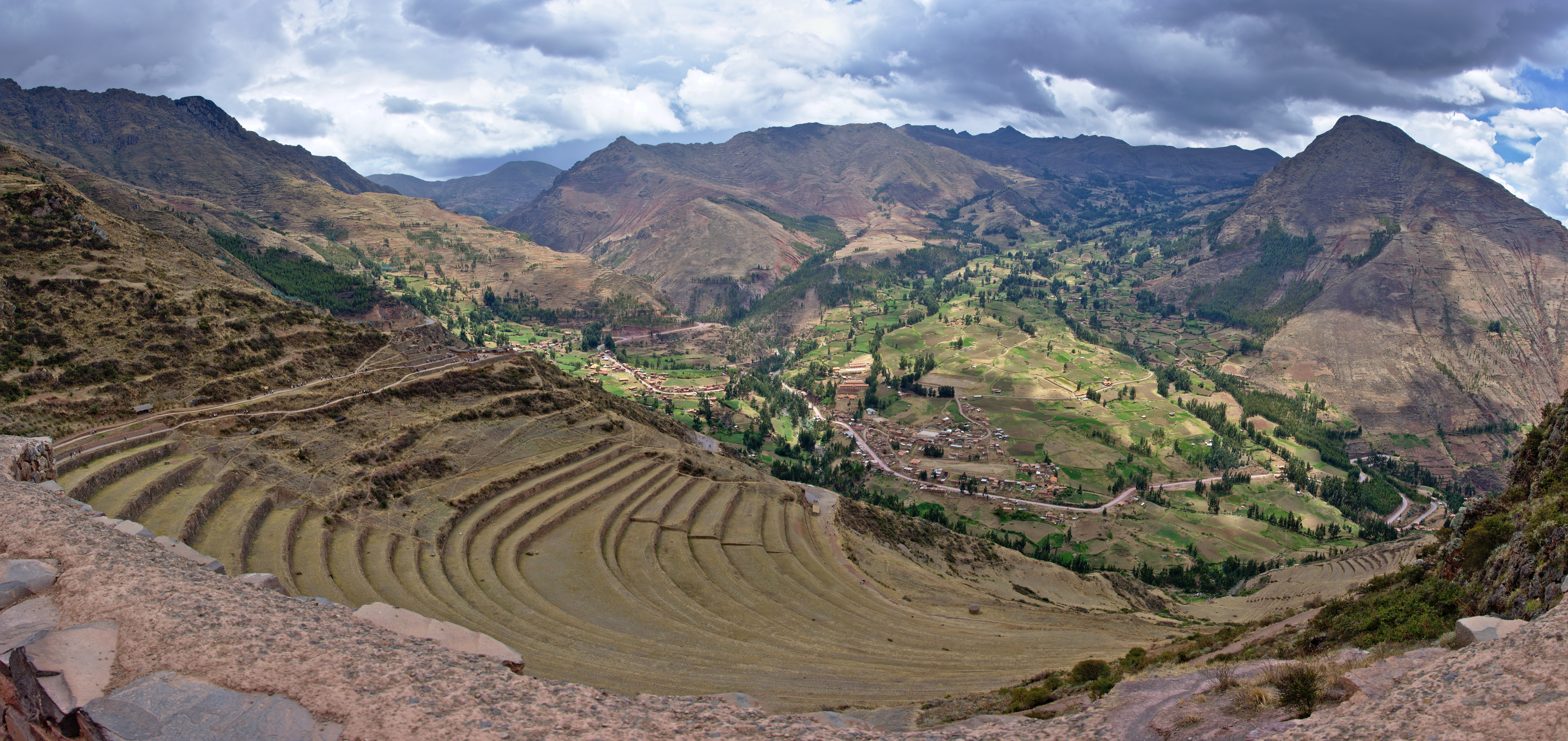
Panorama from Q'allaqasa

=== Qantus Raqay (Qanchis Racay) area ===
Located 3,446 m above sea level on the edge of a precipice Qantus Raqay (from the Quechua words qanchus (seven) and raqay (enclosure)) is also known as "Kanturaqay". One of three residential areas in the complex and spreading over three levels it consists of rough stone buildings with pirka type walls made with non-carved mud bonded small and medium-sized stones. The walls were originally had a clay stucco applied overtop, indicating that they were probably inhabited by those of a lower-status. From its position overlooking the road toward the Paucartambo region and the Antisuyo and controlling the northeastern corner of the complex it probably served as the home of the military garrison or as a shelter for local villagers in times of war.

=== T'antana Marka ===
Opposite the Inca baths on the other side of the gully down which the Kitamayu River flows are tombs cut into the steep cliff face of the adjacent mountain. This was one of the largest cemeteries in the pre-Columbian world, with more than 3,500 tombs in various states of destruction, though some sources claim as many as 10,000 tombs. Its name comes from tankay (to push) and marka (place), which can be translated as launch site. The Incas believed in reincarnation, so the kept their mummies buried in the fetal position with all their belongings and food needed for their new life. After the arrival of the Spaniards, huaqueros (grave robbers) did not hesitate to desecrate the graves and plunder the jewels, metals and precious stones. Today only small holes remain as a result of the desecration.

=== Terraces ===
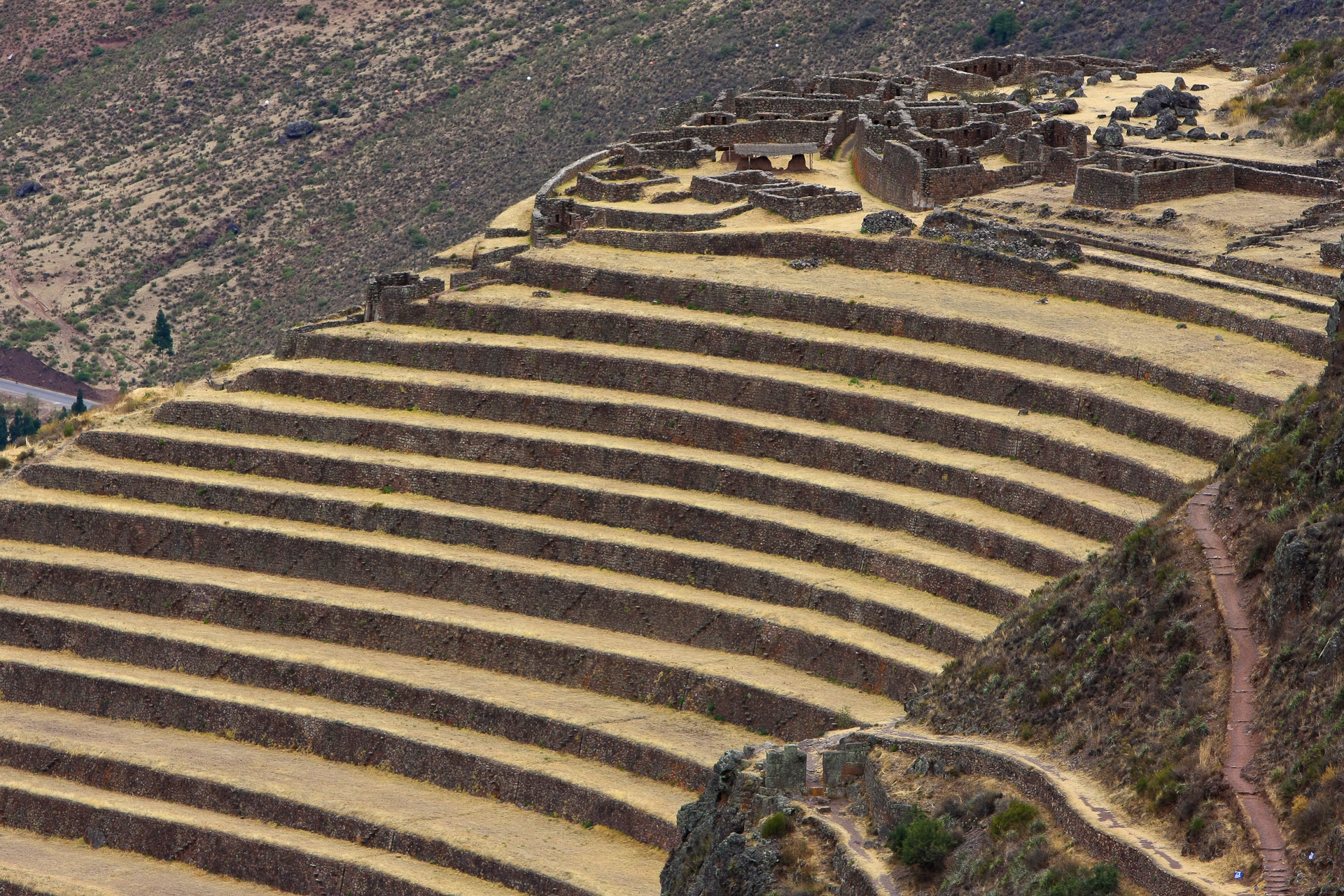
Some of the 500 andenes of Pisac

The mountain spur is covered with approximately 500 agricultural terraces called andenes, some 6 metres (20 ft) high in places, which follow the contours of the hillside. While they reduced the threat of soil erosion from landslides their primary purpose was to expand the amount of arable land. The terraces are contained by walls of field stones roughly to fit one another, typically 600 to 750 mm (23 to 30 inches) thick.

As well as creating a level planting area and retaining humidity, the stone retaining walls heat up during the day and slowly release that heat to the soil as temperatures plunge at night, keeping sensitive plant roots warm during frosts and thus expanding the growing season. They also allowed the growing of crops at higher attitudes, with studies having found that the ambient temperature of terraced areas being 3 °C higher than that of unterraced hillsides and a downshift in elevation of approximately 600 metres (2,000 ft). The use of gravel to backfill the lower levels of the terraces conserves water and yet ensures that following heavy rains the water drains and doesn't build inside which would cause the soil to expand and push out the wall.

There are at least 14 different shapes of terrace at heights from 2,995 metres (9,826 ft) to 3,450 metres (11,320 ft) metres above sea level. Many are still in use today. The terraces closest to modern Písac are the Andenes Acchapata, which consist of up of 40 individual terraces which extend down to the valley floor and the river.

=== Tianayuc ===
This is a seat near the Inca Qonqorina area cut out of a single rock with room for two people. Hence the name Tianayuc that means "it has seat". There are also the remains of a tower that once dominated this part of the Kitamayu gorge.

=== Towers ===
The complex is home to more than 20 towers (called Pucaras, which can be divided into two types: Habitaculo towers and Atalaya towers; the first have a conical shape with well carved jointed stones and are connected to water channels. The Atalaya towers are almost conical and appear to have been used as watchtowers. The most important are in the Coriwayrachina area, where they guard the path up from up from the present-day town of Písac. Below the towers are terraces (andenes).

=== Tunnels ===
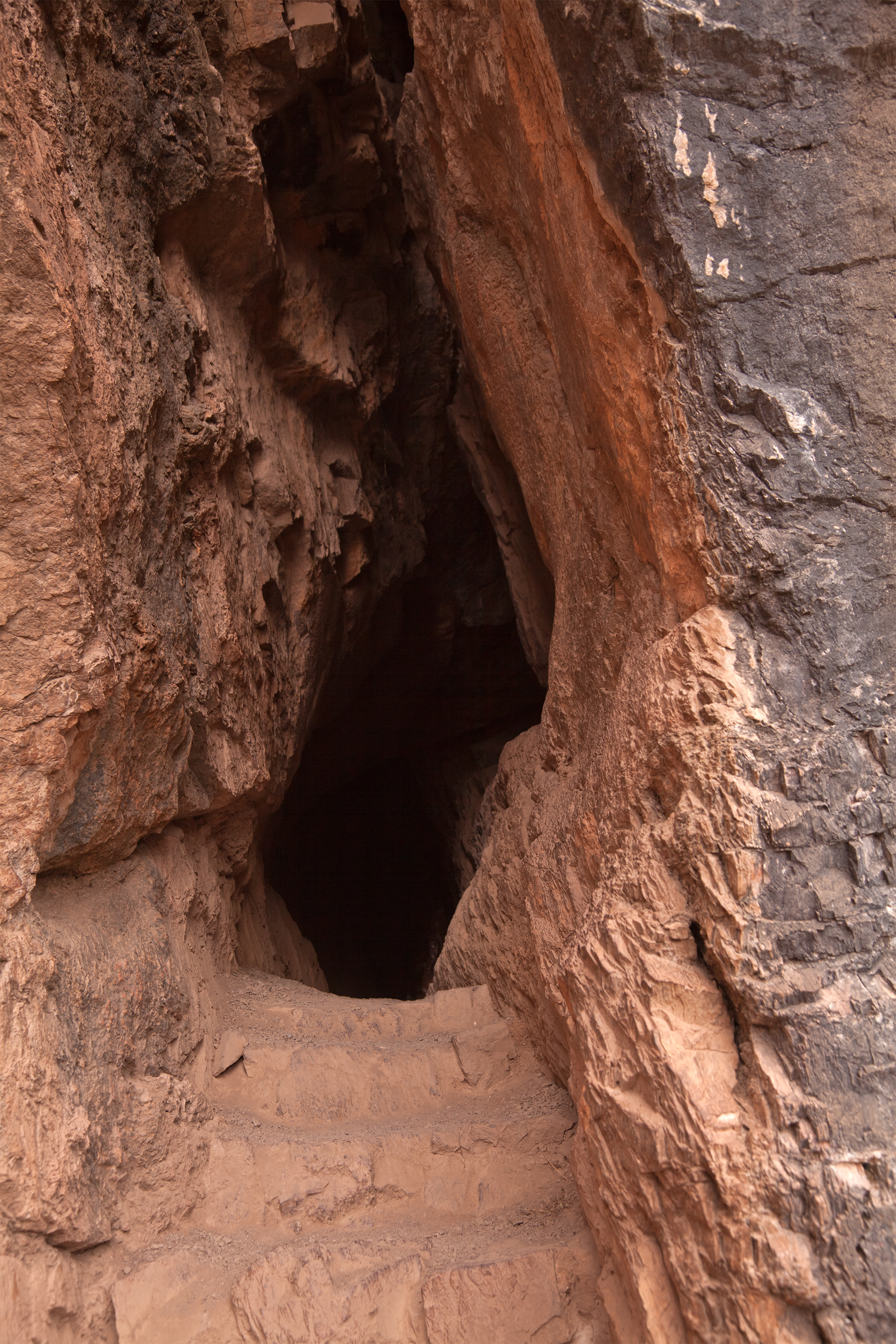
Tunnel connecting the Qallaq'asa with the Intiwatana

On the eastern slope of the ridge on a path that connects the bottom area of the Qallaq'asa with the Intiwatana the Inca engineers enlarged a natural fissure in the rock to create a 16 metres (52 ft) long tunnel through the entire cliff. The teardrop-shaped slit is just wide enough for one person to traverse single file and would have served as an excellent defensive location. From the Qallaq'asa, a path runs along the upper part of the ridge via the Tianayuc and through a three-metre long tunnel to the Intiwatana.

=== Water supplies ===
The complex has at least five water supply channels, more than two irrigation channels, more than three agricultural drainage channels, but no domestic wastewater drainage. There were five canals, which each distributed to different spaces: the canals would pass through the fountains and baths and help with agriculture.

Water is collected from a small lake 4,500 metres (14,800 ft) above sea level and conveyed via a canal to four purification baths near the river on the flat area between the Qanchus Racay and Qallaq'asa before passing along another canal to supply the Qanchus Racay area.

Another source of water is a spring on the left bank of the Kitamayu River, which is collected in a basin and then conveyed in a canal that runs along the foot of the T'antana Marka and which then crosses the river via the 20.7 metres (68 ft) long 20 metres (66 ft) high Antachara aqueduct to the other side where it passes via along the cliff face via another 20 metres (66 ft) long by 7 metres (23 ft) high aqueduct (held aloft on three large pillars) and then in a canal all the way to the ceremonial-religious area surrounding the Intiwatana. The name Antachaca comes from the Quechua words anta (cooper) and chaka (bridge). From the Inca Qonqorina area a small canal running down the hillside discharges via fountains in to the main canal bring water from the Antachara to the Intiwatana area. From the Intiwatana area, another channel drops down towards the P'isaqa area.

== Gallery ==
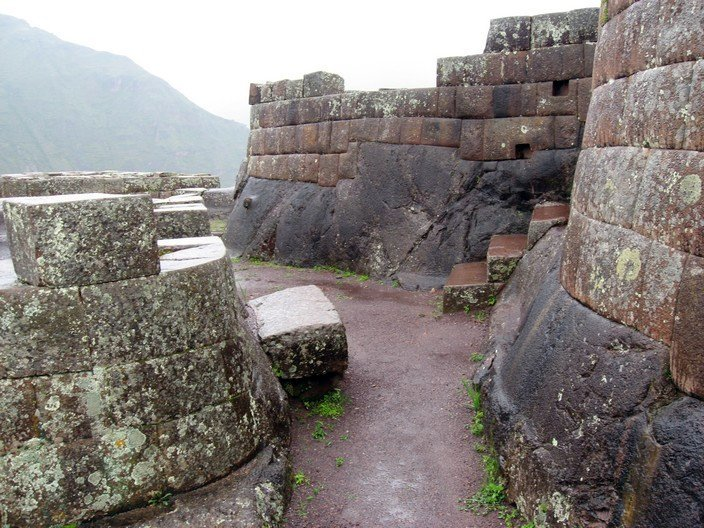
Inca structures in one of the urban areas of Pisac

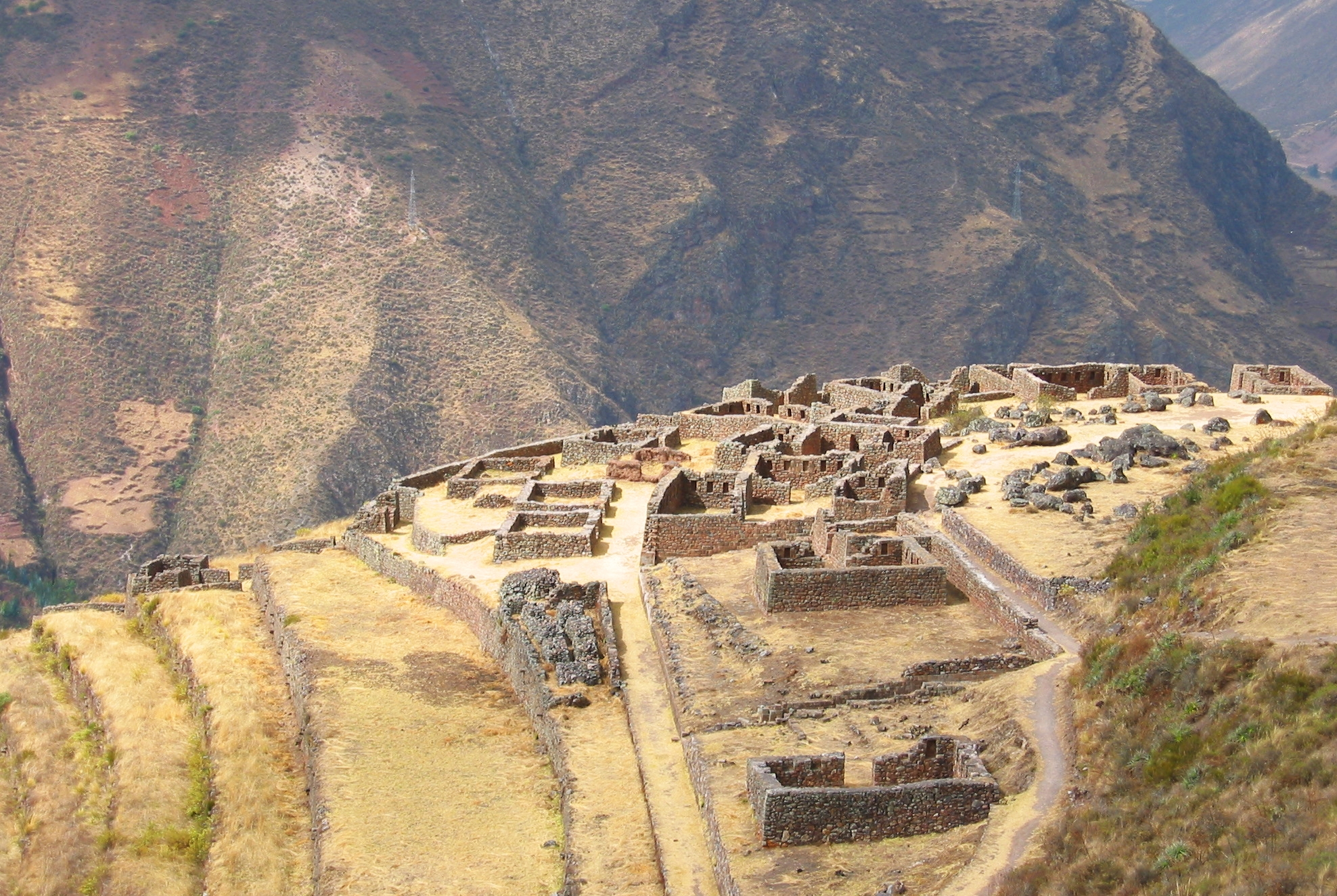
The P'isaqa residential area

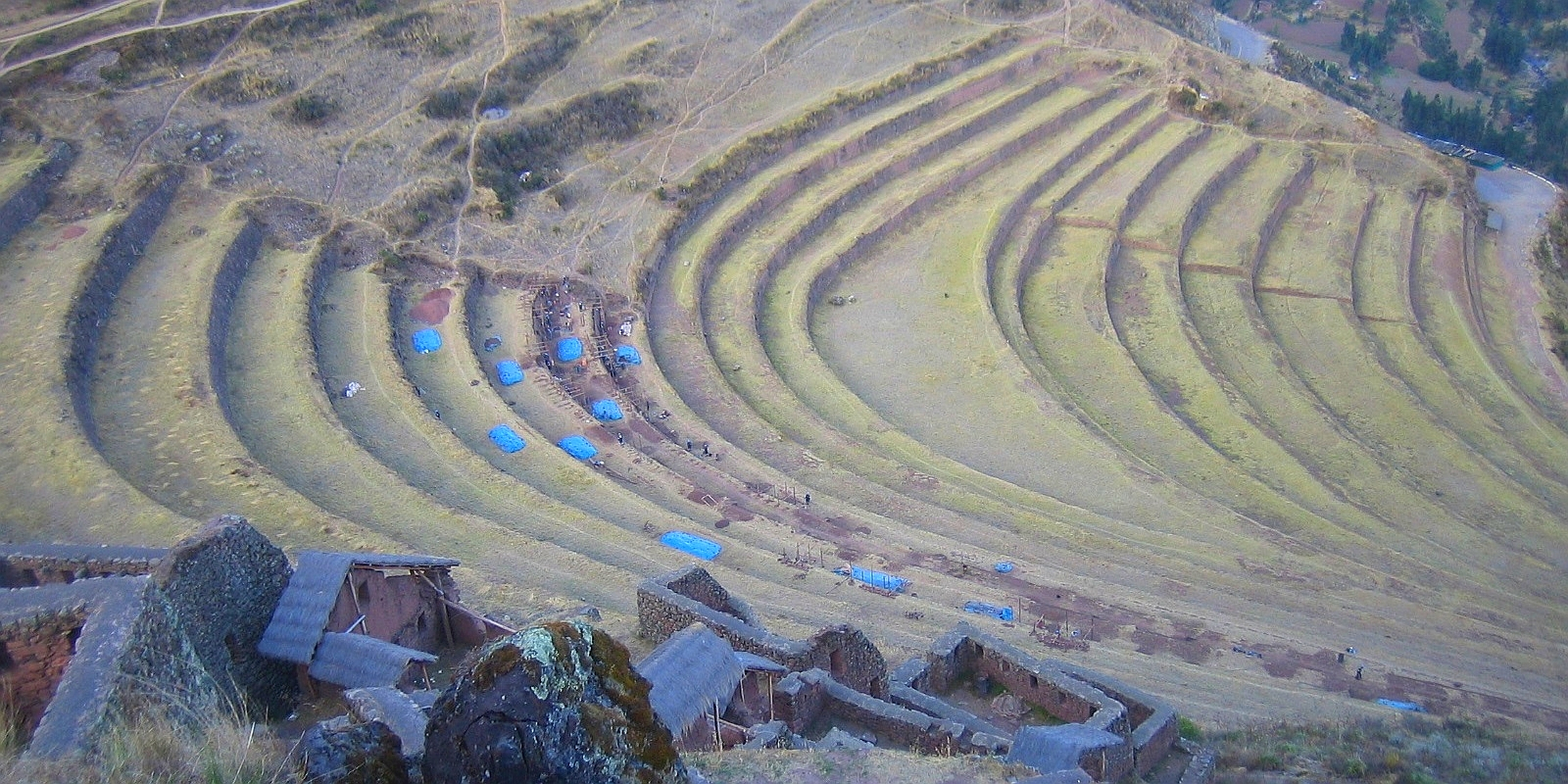
View from Qallaq'asa of the terraces (andenes)

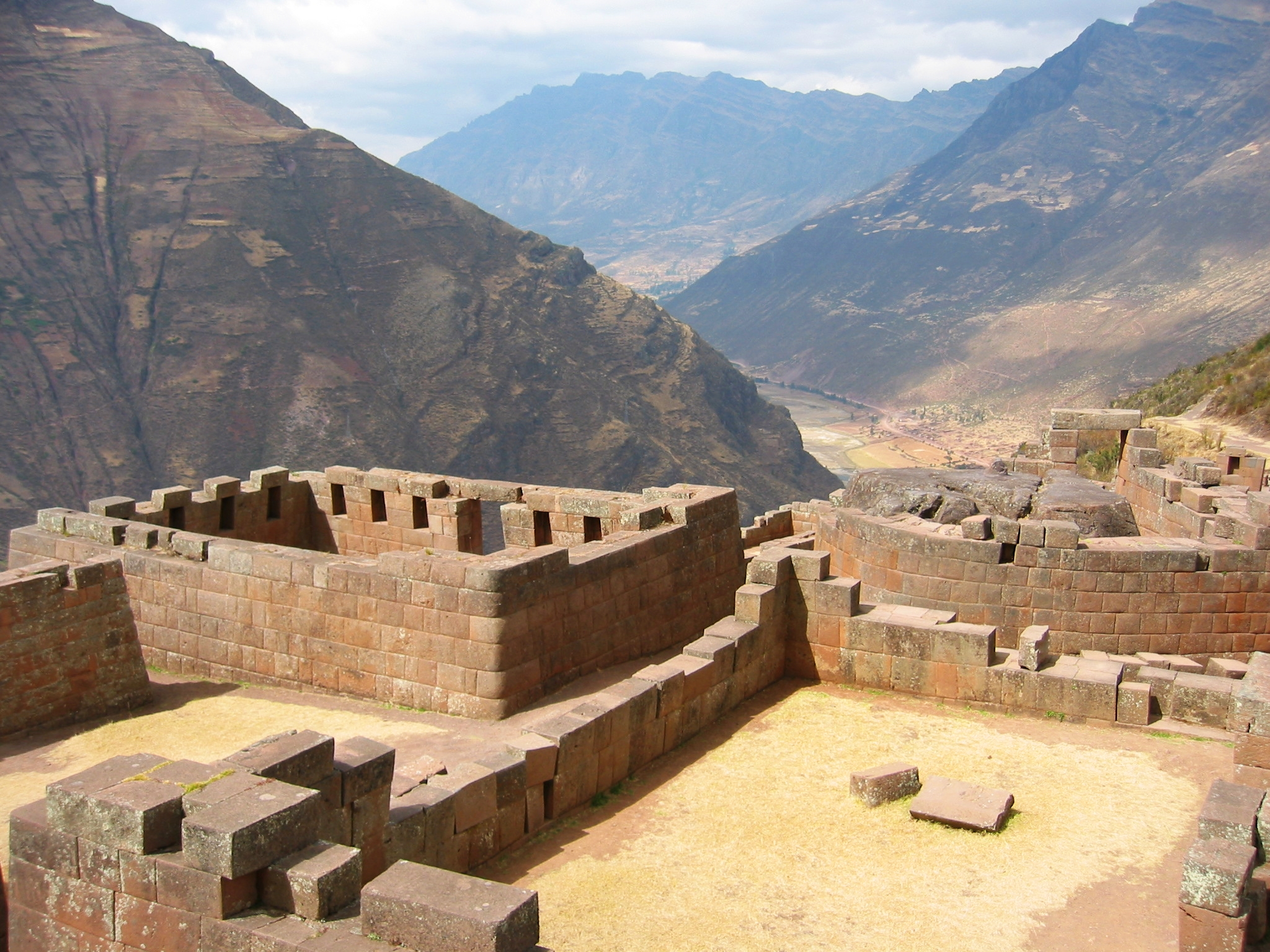
View of the Sacred Valley from the Intiwatana.

A panorama of the ruins of forts, terraces and ceremonial structures of Písac, Peru in 2024.

== See also ==
- Ichhunayuq
- Machu Kuntur Sinqa
- Willka Raymi
