= Pisac (disambiguation) =

Pisac is a city in Peru.

Pisac may also refer to:

- Pisac, an Inca archaeological complex in Peru
- Pisac District, a district in Peru
- Pisach, or Piśac, a type of demons in South and Southeast Asian mythologies

== See also ==
- Pisak, a village in Croatia
