= Ichhunayuq =

Mountain in Peru

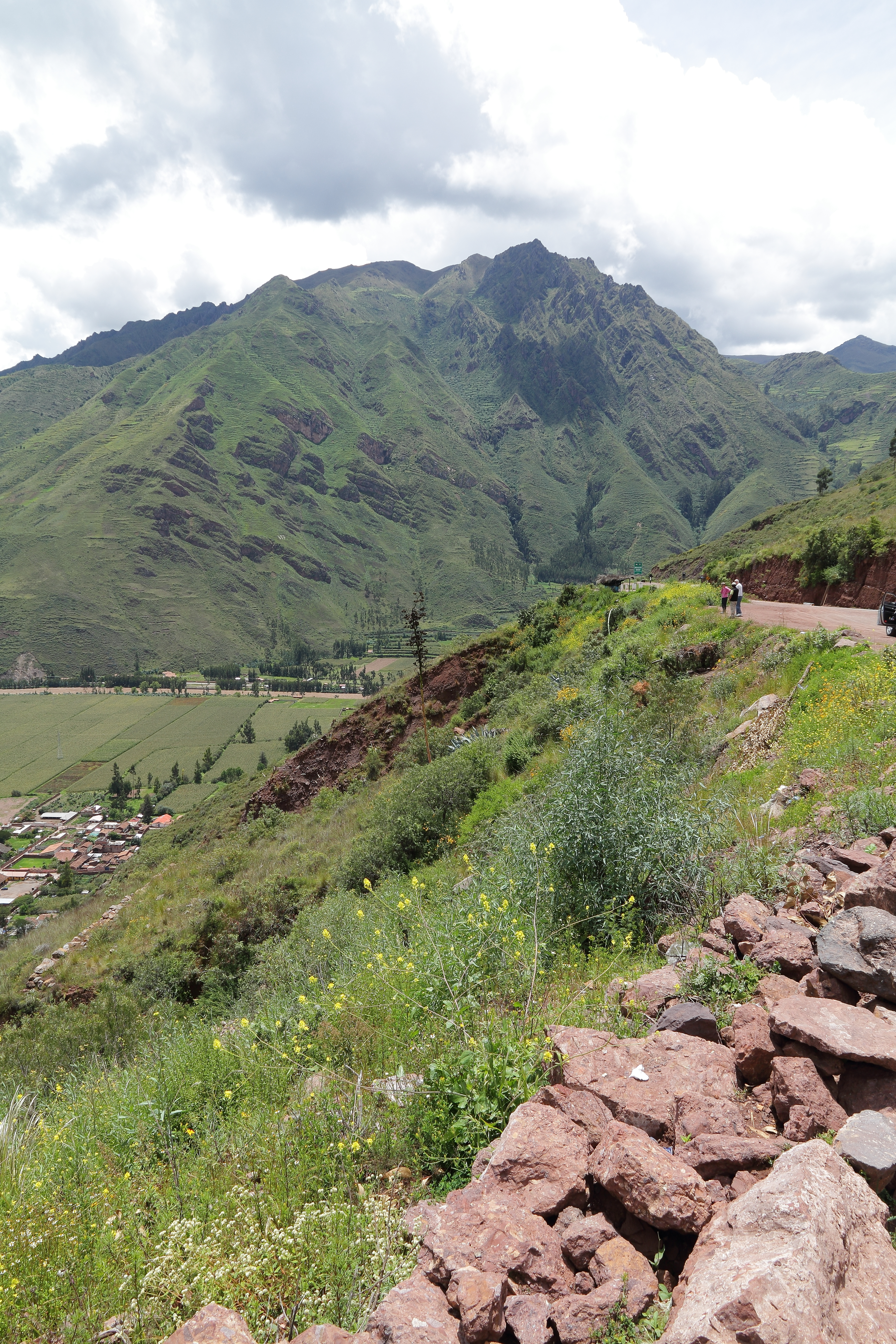
- Ichhunayuq as seen from Ñustapata above the village of Taray

Highest point
- Elevation: 4,200 m (13,800 ft)
- Coordinates: 13°23′25″S 71°51′46″W

Geography
- Location within Peru
- Location: Peru, Cusco Region
- Parent range: Andes

Ichhunayuq (Quechua ichhuna sickle, -yuq a suffix to indicate ownership, "the one with a sickle", Hispanicized spelling Ichunayoc) is a mountain in the Andes of Peru, about 4,200 metres (13,780 ft) high. It is located in the Cusco Region, Calca Province, on the border of the districts of Coya and Pisac. Ichhunayuq lies at the archaeological site of Písac, northwest of the town.

== See also ==
- Machu Kuntur Sinqa
