= Andén =

Agricultural terraces in the Andes

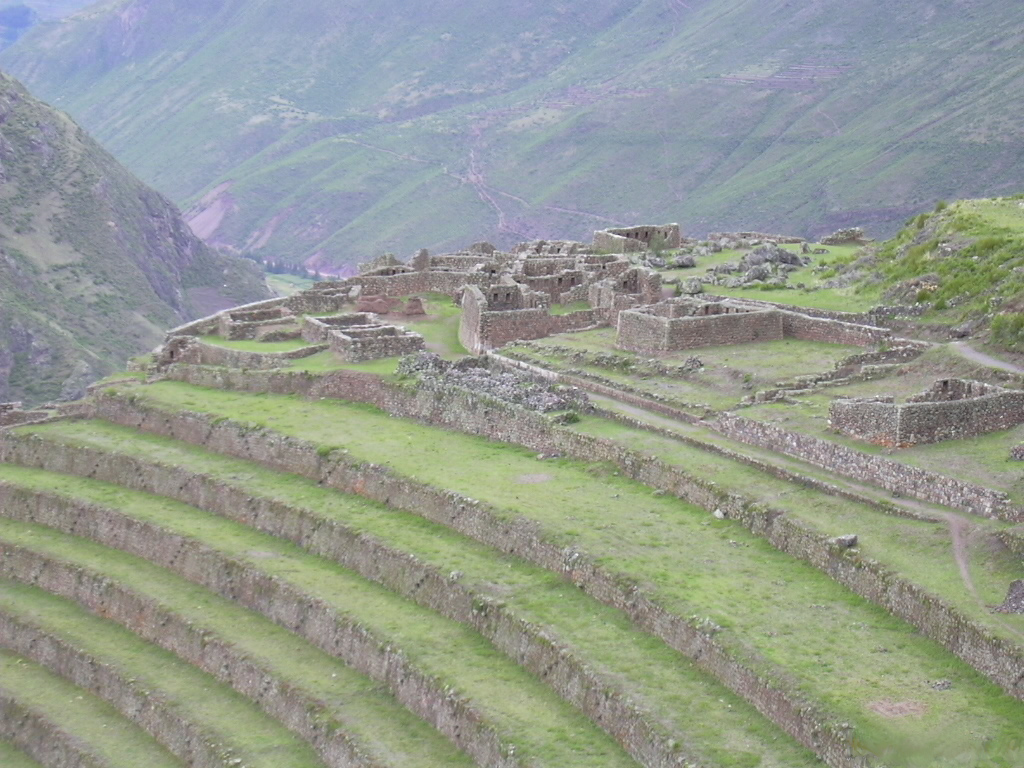
Andenes in the Sacred Valley at Pisac, Peru

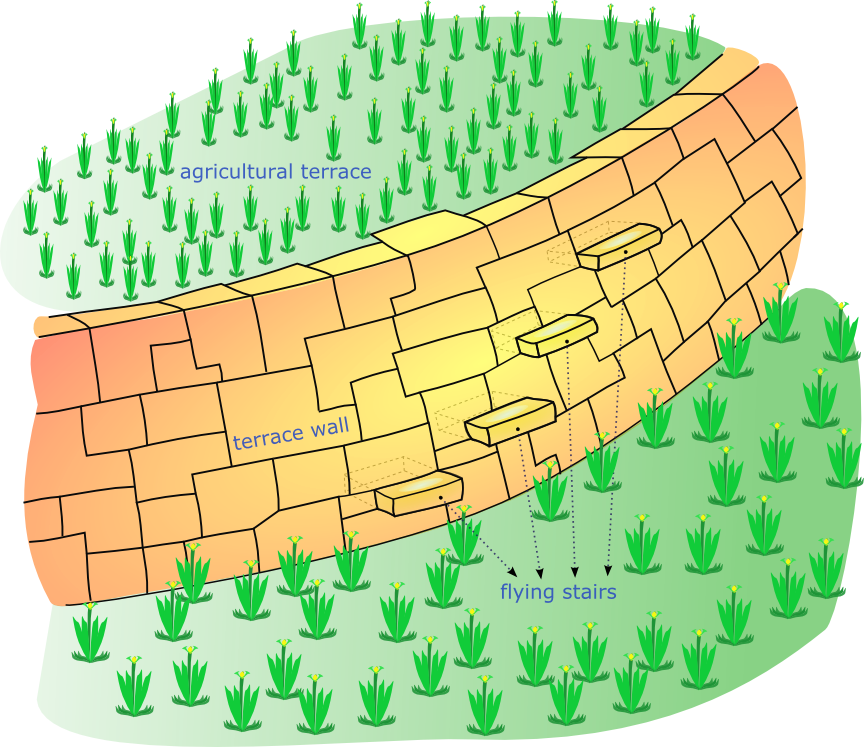
Diagram of Inca engineering of andenes

An andén (plural andenes), Spanish for "platform", is a stair-step like terrace dug into the slope of a hillside for agricultural purposes. The term is most often used to refer to the terraces built by pre-Columbian cultures in the Andes mountains of South America. Andenes had several functions, the most important of which was to increase the amount of cultivatable land available to farmers by leveling a planting area for crops. The best known andenes are in Peru, especially in the Sacred Valley near the Inca capital of Cuzco and in the Colca Canyon. Many andenes have survived for more than 500 years and are still in use by farmers throughout the region.

The benefits of andenes include utilizing steep slopes for agriculture, reducing the threat of freezes, increasing exposure to sunshine, controlling erosion, improving absorption of water, and aerating the soil. The construction and use of andenes for crops enabled agriculture in the Andes to expand into climatically marginal areas of low or seasonal rainfall, low temperatures, and thin soils.

== Origin and history ==
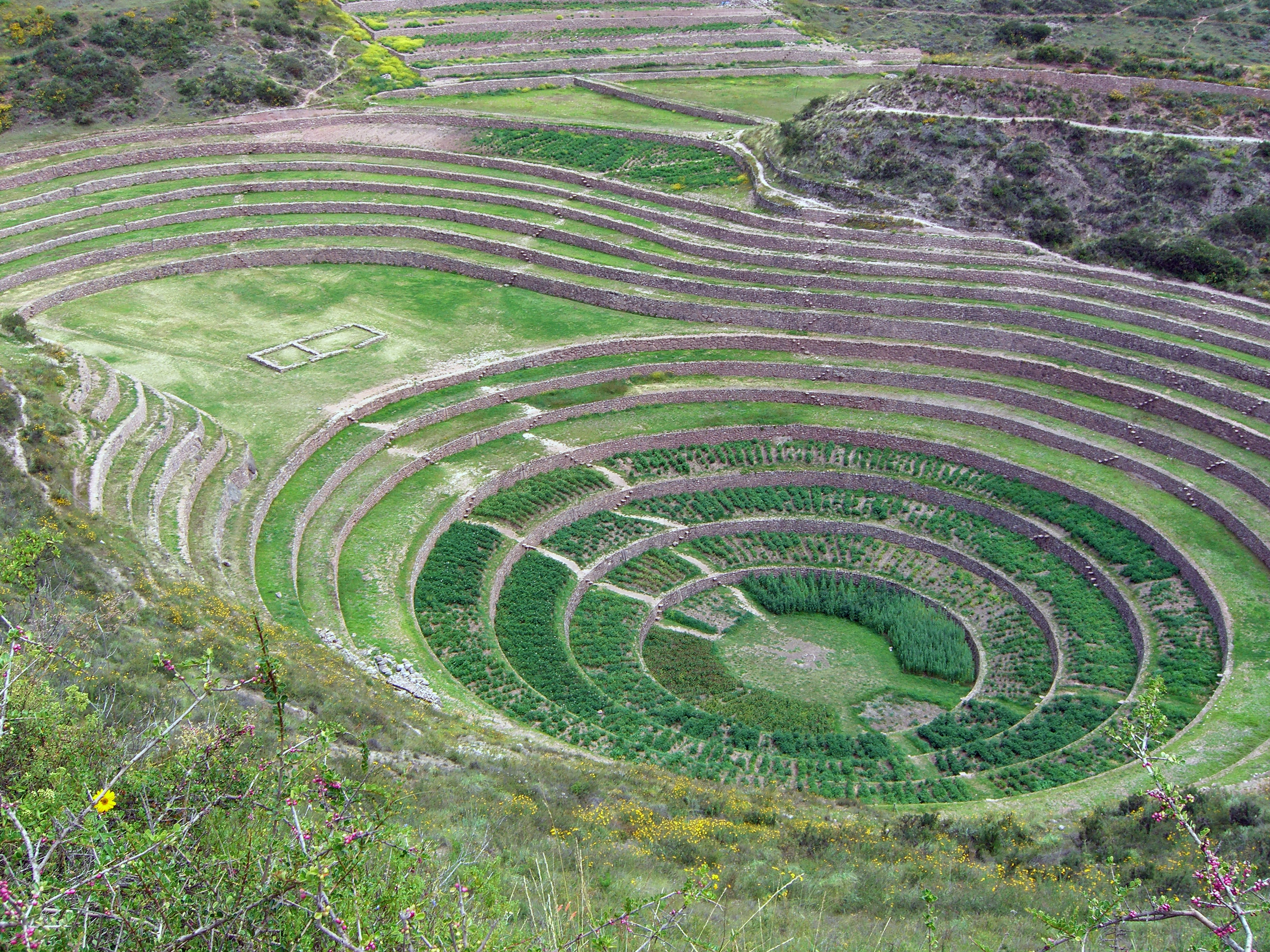
Andenes at Moray, Peru

Agricultural terraces have been built and used by farmers around the world for thousands of years, mainly for the purpose of permitting cultivation on steep hillsides. The origin of terraces or andenes in the Andes is poorly understood, but they were being built by 2000 BCE. Agriculture became essential for the subsistence of a growing population after 900 BCE. People of the Huarpa culture and the later Wari culture (500–1000 CE) built terraces into the hillsides of the Andes in Peru. During the Inca Empire (1438–1533 CE) the technology and the quantity of land devoted to andenes reached their highest levels. Archaeologists estimate that andenes covered about 1,000,000 hectares (2,500,000 acres) of land and contributed substantially to feeding the approximately ten million people ruled by the Incas. (Note: Ten million is a mid-range estimate of the population of the Inca Empire.)

The Spanish conquest of Peru in 1533 led to a demographic collapse in the Andes, as the Indigenous population precipitously declined due to European diseases and war. With lessened population pressure, many farmers relocated or were relocated by force in accordance with the Spanish policy of reductions to flatter and more easily cultivated lands. Also, the Spanish introduced oxen and horses as draft animals and plows. Andenes were difficult to access by these innovations, being most suitable for the hand tiller. In the 19th century with population growth, a number of andenes came back into use, but in the late 20th century 60 to 80 percent of andenes had been abandoned for growing crops, although they may be used for grazing.

== Engineering ==
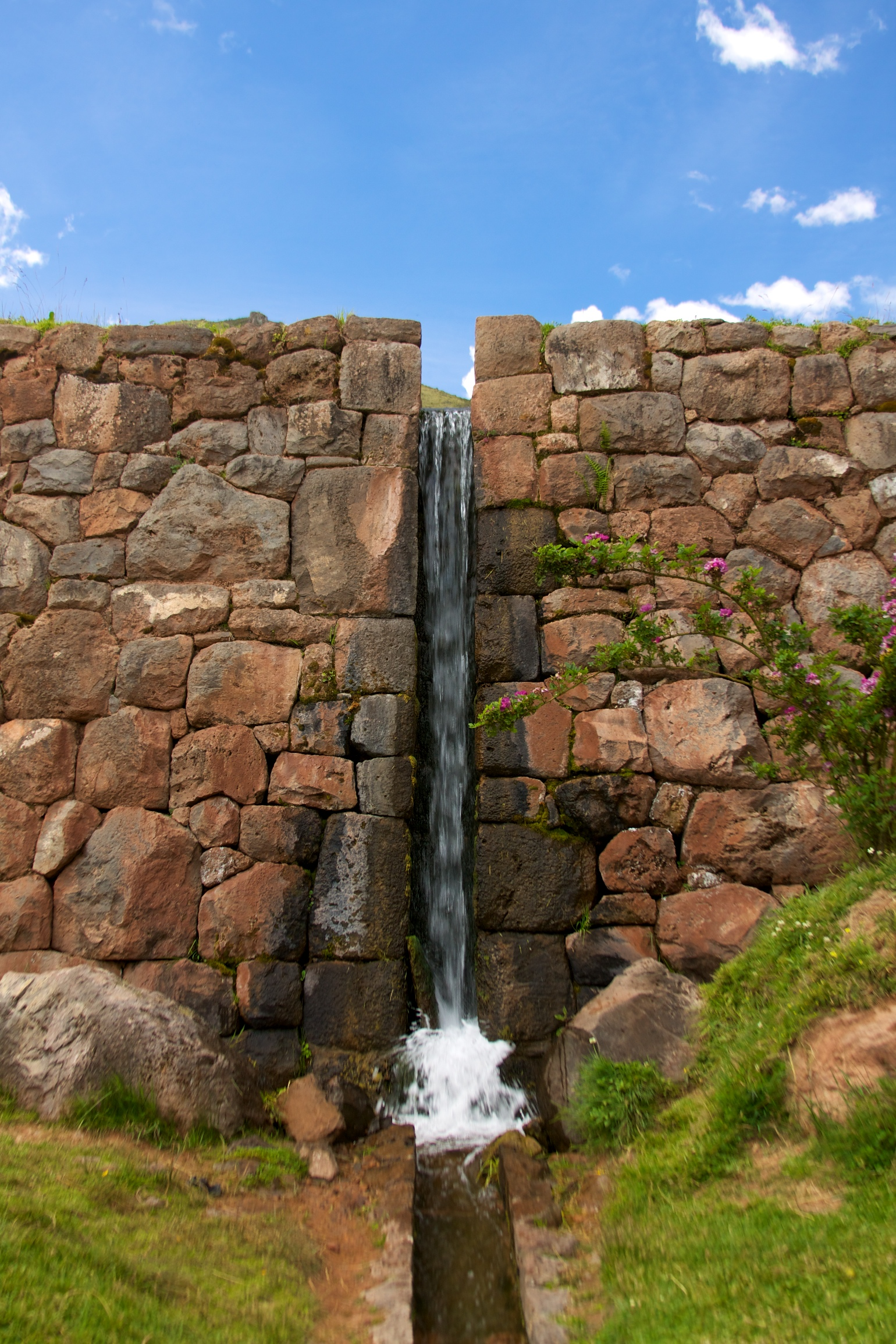
A water channel to drain and irrigate andenes

Andenes were complicated to build, requiring provisions for drainage and irrigation. The first step in constructing an andén was to lay an underground or bedrock foundation about 1 metre (3.3 ft) deep to lend strength and stability to the retaining wall, which might rise about 2 metres (6.6 ft) above the slope of the ground. Behind the foundation, the bottom one metre (3.3 ft) was filled with large stones, overlaid by a layer about 1 metre (3.3 ft) thick of sand or gravel. Capping the top of the terrace was a layer of topsoil about 1 metre (3.3 ft) thick. The result was a terrace providing "well-drained rich soil and a level surface for growing crops." At prestigious or royal sites, such as Machu Picchu, finely cut stone was used as the outer (visible) face of the retaining wall. The planting surface of an andén is variable, but in the Colca Valley averages 3 metres (9.8 ft) wide.

The rock and sand layers were to aid drainage of excessive precipitation and were especially important in areas with abundant rainfall. At Machu Picchu, surface drains conveyed excess water to a main drain which supplied water to fountains and a domestic water supply canal. In arid areas, such as the Colca Valley, where Andenes are still cultivated, water for irrigation is brought down from the snow melt of high peaks and springs via a complex system of canals and reservoirs. Irrigation water is released from a reservoir onto the top-most andén and the overflow irrigates the lower andenes. If irrigation water is inadequate, agriculture on the lower andenes will fail. As strategies of risk management, farmers in the present day – and probably in pre-Columbian times – have up to 30 plots of land at different locations and grow a wide variety of crops.

== Micro-climate modification ==
In the steep terrain of the Andes, flat and good farming land was scarce. The adverse climate in much of the Andes was another negative factor for agriculture, which the use of andenes helped overcome. Much of the Inca Empire was found at elevations of more than 3,000 metres (9,800 ft) above sea-level. Farmers grew crops up to an altitude of about 4,250 metres (13,940 ft). Frosts impacting crops, however, can occur above an elevation of 2,200 metres (7,200 ft).

The stone retaining walls of andenes absorbed the sun's heat during the day and radiated it at night, warming the soil and preventing damage to frost-sensitive crops such as maize. An important objective in constructing andenes was to permit maize to be grown at elevations above its usual climatic limit of 3,200 metres (10,500 ft) up to 3,500 metres (11,500 ft). Maize was a prestige crop for the Incas and earlier cultures, but of the crops cultivated in the Andes, it is the most demanding of water and nutrients.

== Rehabilitation ==
Andenes in the Colca Canyon

Efforts to rehabilitate and bring andenes back into production near Cuzco began in the 1970s. In 2014, the Peruvian Ministry of Agriculture and the Inter-American Development Bank began a project to rehabilitate andenes, including those near Laraos in the Lima region.

== Notable collections of andenes ==
The andenes possess an appeal beyond the historical and their original economic motivations: they are also landscape resources whose situation in the Andes Mountains has notable aesthetic value. Many of them follow the natural curve of the slopes in such a way that preserves the visual harmony of the environment. The idea of hanging gardens in the mountains can fit well with the description of the Andenes.

At the Salinas de Maras near Cuzco, andenes are used to create 3,000 salt pans to evaporate salt. The andenes and salt industry are believed to date to pre-Incaic (before 1430 CE) times. A distinctive pink-hued salt is still being produced in the 21st century.

Between central Peru and northern Bolivia are found the best conserved collection of andenes. Perhaps the most impressive Andenes zone is the Colca Canyon (Valle de Colca), whose terraces were constructed by the Collaguas beginning in the 11th century. Those on the islands in Lake Titicaca (constructed by the Aymara) are visually stunning, as are those in the so-called Sacred Valley of the Incas (Valle Sagrado de los Incas) in Cusco, those constructed by the Incas in Moray (Inca ruin) in a collection of concentric circles, as well as the enormous terraces at Pisaq and Ollantaytambo.

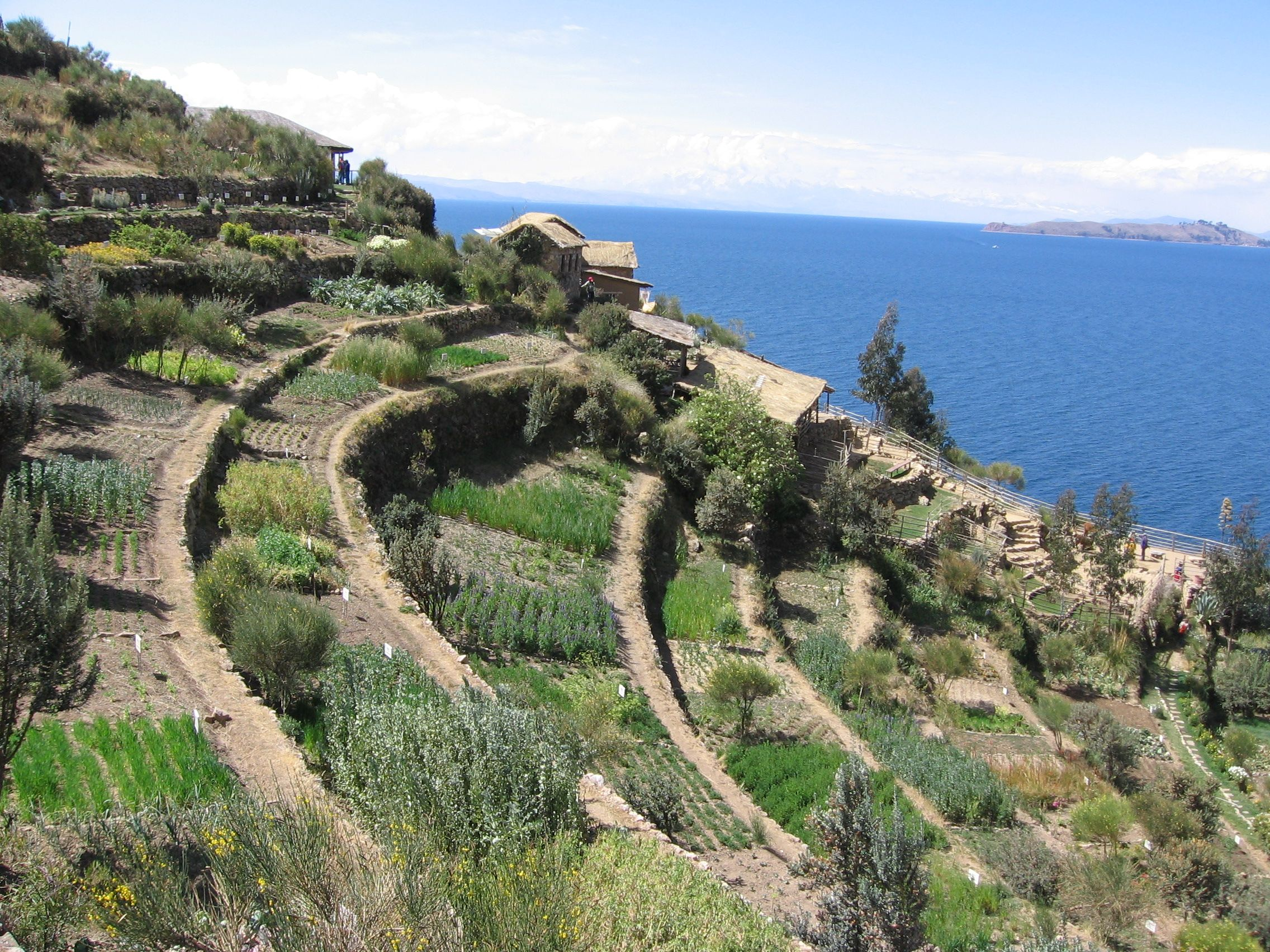
Andenes in Bolivia overlooking Lake Titicaca

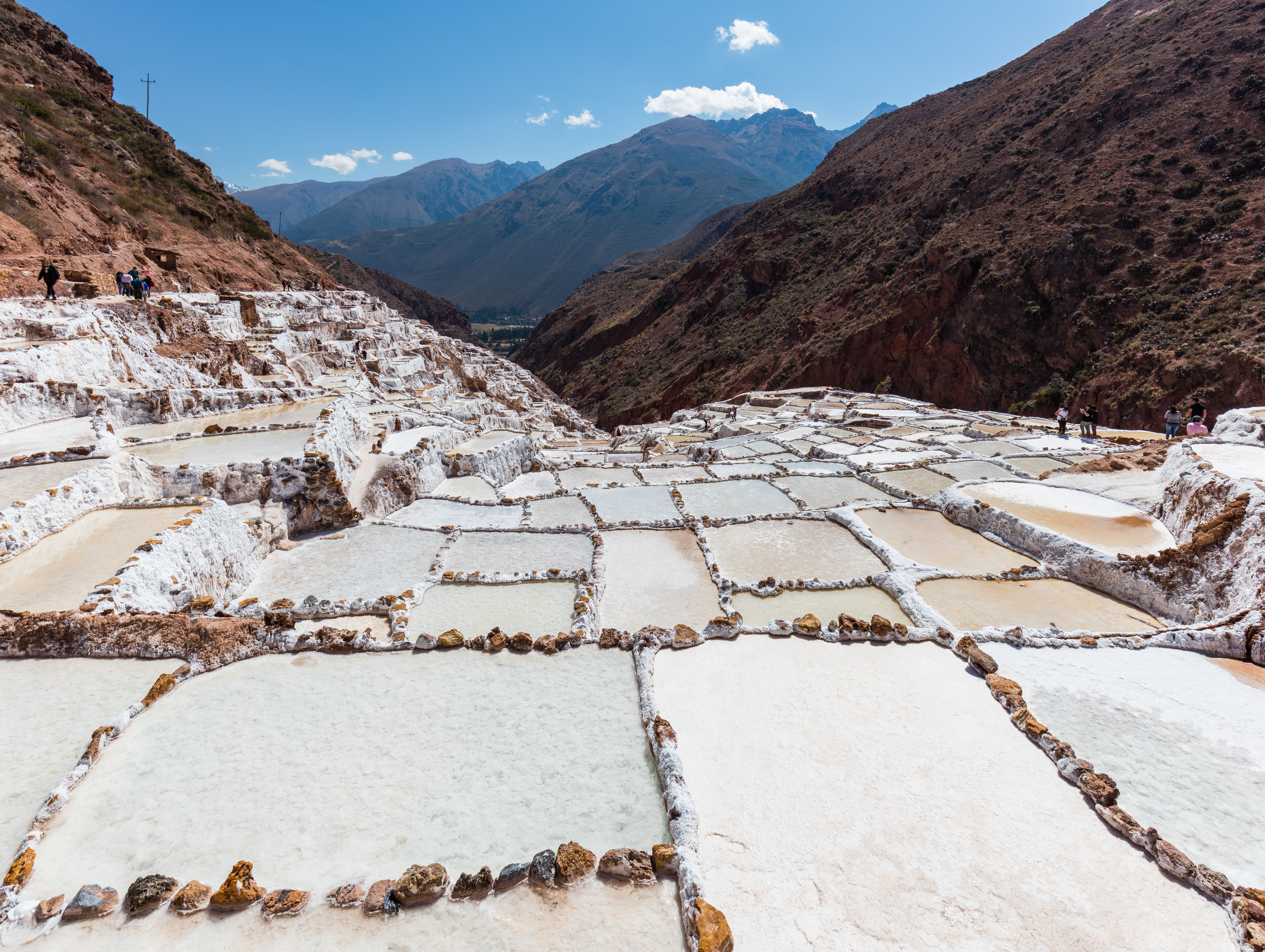
Salt pans at the Salinas de Maras

== See also ==
- Agriculture
- Incan agriculture
- Terrace (agriculture)

== General and cited references ==
- Earls, John. "The Character of Inca and Andean Agriculture" (PDF). Archived from the original (PDF) on 17 May 2017.
- Goodman-Elgar, Melissa (2008). "Evaluating soil resilience in long-term cultivation: a study of Pre-Columbian terraces from the Paca Valley, Peru". Journal of Archaeological Science. 35 (12): 3072–3086. doi:10.1016/j.jas.2008.06.003 – via Elsevier Science Direct.
- Graber, Cynthia (6 September 2011). "Farming Like the Incas". Smithsonian.
- Guillet, David; et al. (1987). "Terracing and Irrigation in the Peruvian Highlands". Current Anthropology. 28 (4): 409–410. doi:10.1086/203546. JSTOR 2743482. S2CID 147512132.
- McEwan, Gordon F. (2006). The Incas: New Perspective. New York: Norton and Company. ISBN 9781851095742.
