= Písac =

Town in Cusco, Peru

Písac Pisac
- Town
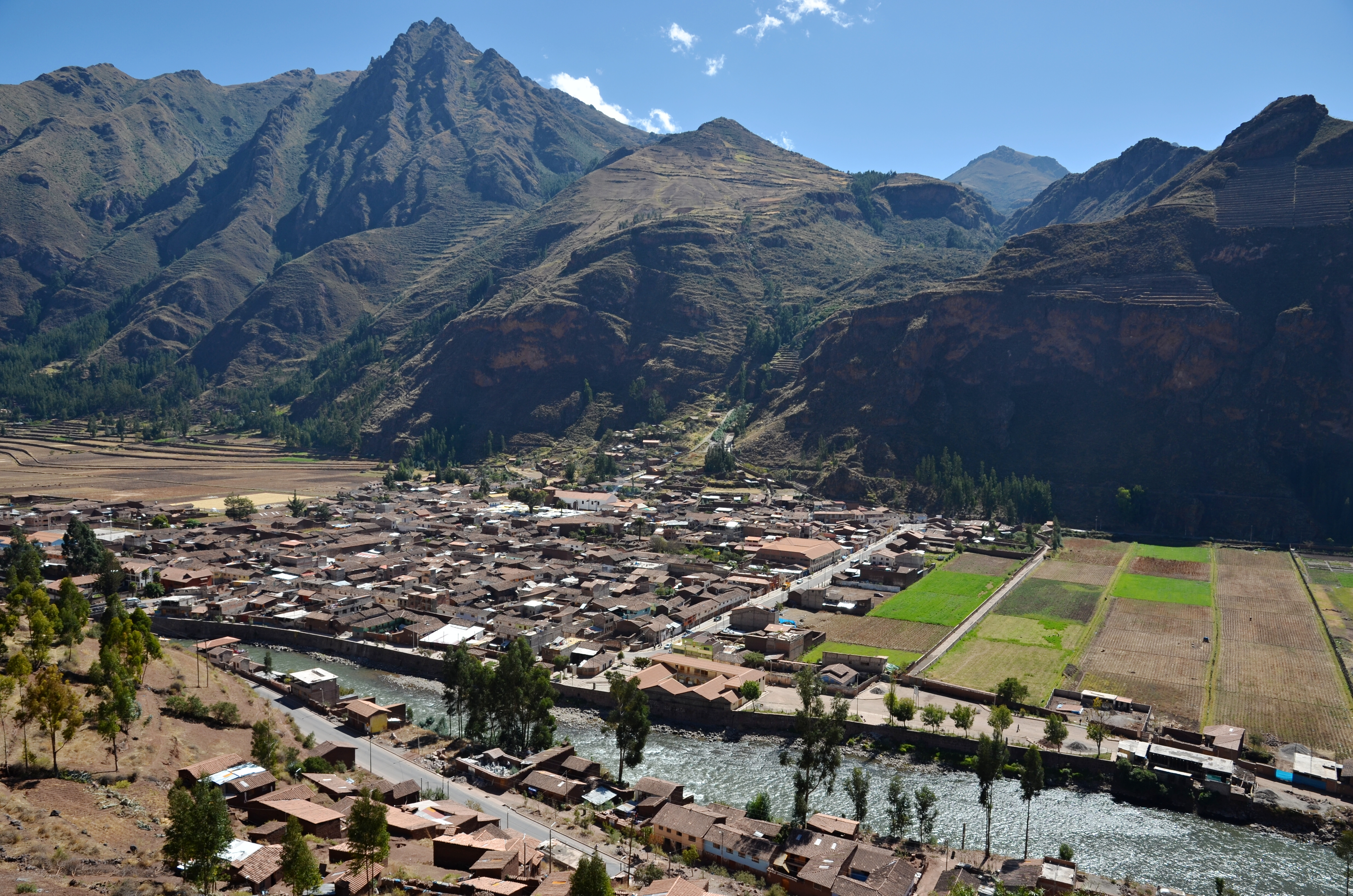
- Modern town of Pisac in the Sacred Valley

- Location within Peru
- Coordinates: 13°25′27″S 71°51′28″W
- Country: Peru
- Region: Cusco
- Province: Calca
- District: Pisac

Area
  - Total: 148.25 km^{2} (57.24 sq mi)
- Elevation: 2,972 m (9,751 ft)

Population (2002)
  - Total: 9,796
  - Density: 66.08/km^{2} (171.1/sq mi)
- Time zone: UTC-5 (PET)

Písac or Pisac (possibly from Quechua for Nothoprocta, also spelled p'isaqa) is a Peruvian town in the Sacred Valley of the Incas. It is situated on the Urubamba River. Pisac is best known for its Incan ruins and large market which attracts heavy tourist traffic from nearby Cusco.

== History ==
The remains of Lucre and Killke pottery which have been found in the area suggest that the district has been occupied for some time.

An early settlement which probably pre-dated the Inca existed on the hillside between the Quitamayo and Chongo tributaries of the Vilcanota river. This community raised their crops on terraces as well as on the flood plain. Later as the threats from other tribes declined the villagers moved closer to the main road to Cusco and Urcos.

When the Inca Empire conquered the area they constructed a large complex on a mountain ridge overlooking where the current town is now located. The consensus is that it was constructed by the Inca emperor Pachacuti (1438–1471/1472) no earlier than 1440. The consensus among many scholars (among them Kim MacQuarrie) is that Pachacuti constructed it as multi-purpose residence, citadel, observatory and religious site. In this role it would support his panaca (family and descendants), provide a secluded royal retreat located well away from Cusco where he and the nobility could relax between military campaigns, undertake ritual and religious ceremonies, serve as a refuge in times of danger as well as commemorating his victories over the Cuyos. Despite its size and proximity to Cusco the Inca complex is not mentioned by any of the Spanish chroniclers.

Francisco Pizarro and the Spanish conquerors destroyed Inca complex in the early 1530s.

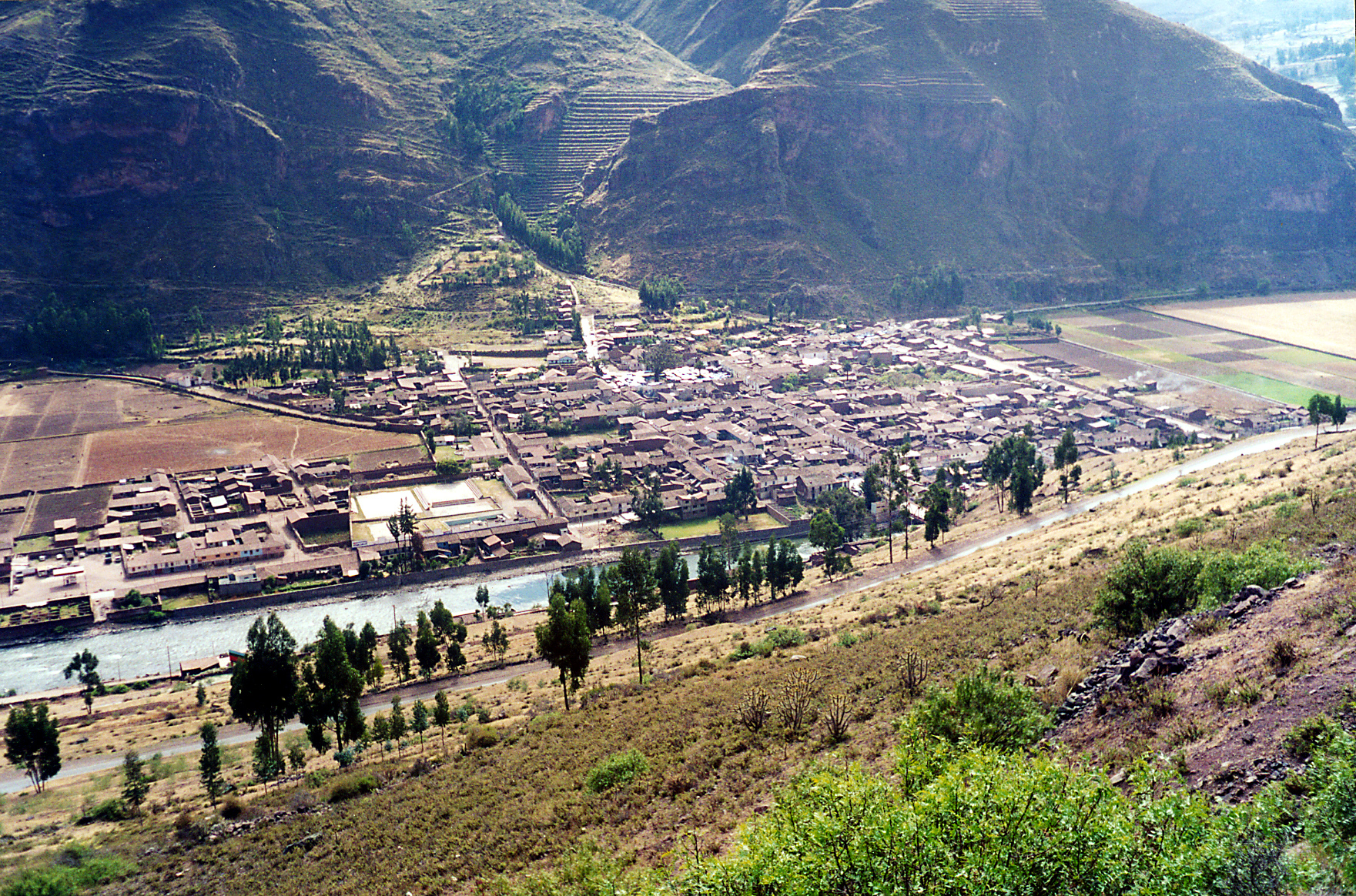
Pisac and the Vilcanota River

The modern town of Písac was built in the valley below the ruins of the Inca complex by Viceroy Francisco de Toledo during the 1570s.

The first modern description of the Pisac occurred in the late 19th century when Ephraim George Squier (1821-1888), the US Commissioner to Peru, visited Pisac and left a detailed description of the Inca ruins in his 1877 book Peru - Incidents of Travel and Exploration in the Land of the Incas.

The Austrian-French scientist-explorer, Charles Wiener (1851-1919) also visited Písac and wrote an account of his explorations in Perou et Bolivie (Paris, 1880).

== Geography ==
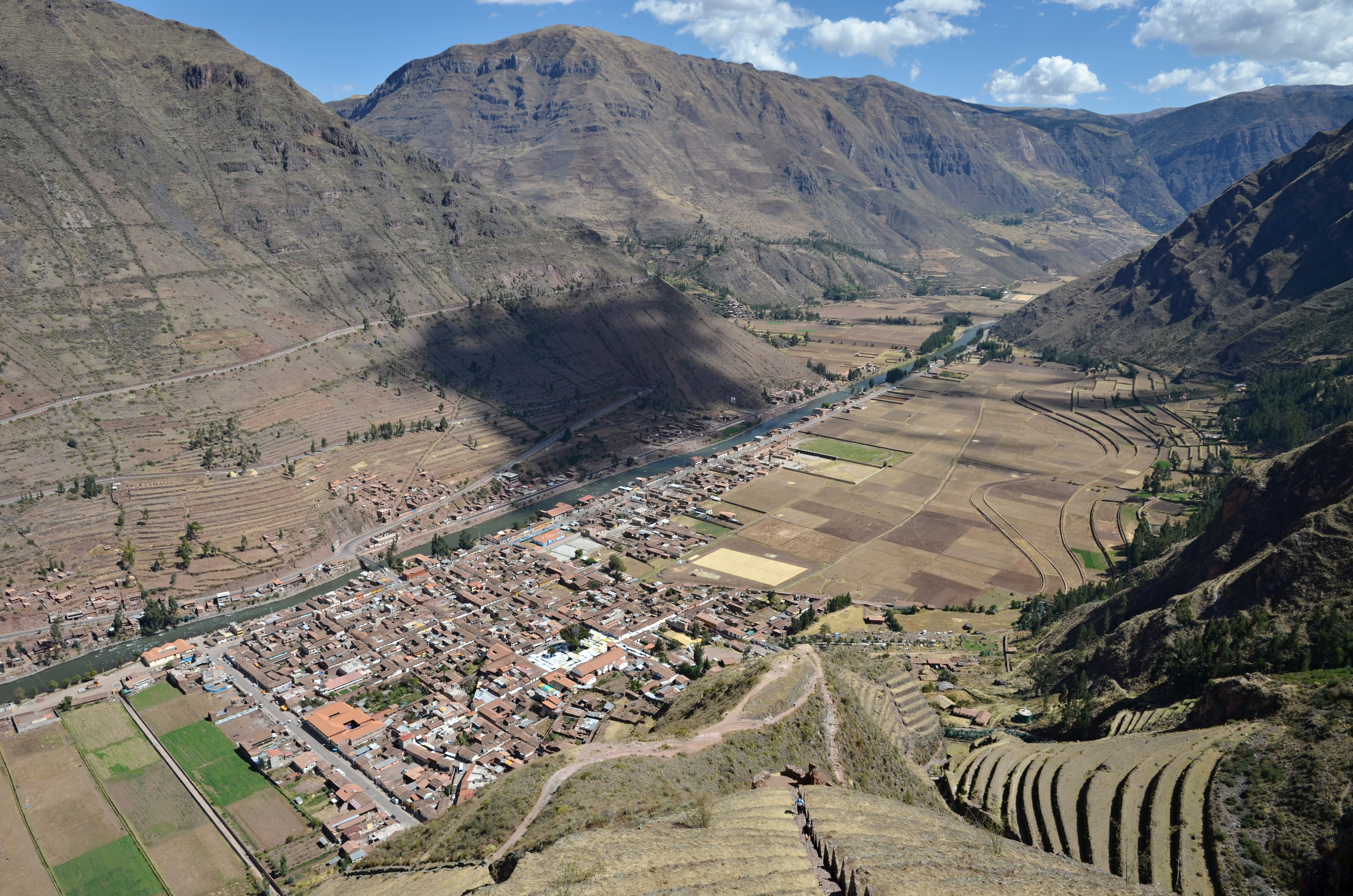
View of the town from the Inca ruins

The town is located in the district of Pisac, in the province of Calca, at the southern end of the Sacred Valley at an altitude of 2,972 metres (9,751 ft), 32 kilometres (20 mi) northeast of Cusco. The town straddles the Vilcanota River, with most of the settlement on its right bank, where it is laid out in a grid pattern, centred around the Plaza Constitución (formerly the Plaza de Almas). The Plaza Constitución was for many years dominated by a large pisonay tree until it was destroyed by a 2013 thunderstorm.

== Climate ==
Climate data for Písac, elevation 2,990 m (9,810 ft), (1991–2020)
Month	Jan	Feb	Mar	Apr	May	Jun	Jul	Aug	Sep	Oct	Nov	Dec	Year
Mean daily maximum °C (°F)	21.8 (71.2)	21.5 (70.7)	22.0 (71.6)	22.7 (72.9)	23.4 (74.1)	23.2 (73.8)	23.0 (73.4)	23.4 (74.1)	23.6 (74.5)	23.7 (74.7)	24.3 (75.7)	22.7 (72.9)	22.9 (73.3)
Mean daily minimum °C (°F)	10.1 (50.2)	10.0 (50.0)	9.7 (49.5)	8.2 (46.8)	6.1 (43.0)	4.6 (40.3)	4.2 (39.6)	5.3 (41.5)	7.5 (45.5)	9.2 (48.6)	9.8 (49.6)	10.0 (50.0)	7.9 (46.2)
Average precipitation mm (inches)	119.1 (4.69)	99.8 (3.93)	83.2 (3.28)	26.4 (1.04)	7.0 (0.28)	4.6 (0.18)	5.6 (0.22)	6.3 (0.25)	11.2 (0.44)	39.7 (1.56)	56.7 (2.23)	99.3 (3.91)	558.9 (22.01)
Source: National Meteorology and Hydrology Service of Peru

== Attractions / Amenities ==
=== Comunitario de Pisac ===
Opened in 2009 this museum on the corner of Avenida Amazonas and Avenida Federico Zamalloa has exhibits on the production of ceramics and the traditional textiles produced by local Quechua communities. A room is dedicated to the Incan presence in the area covering its development from the archaic period (7,000 to 800 years before Christ) to the period of imperial expansion of the Inca state (1400 to 1535). The museum includes a graphical presentation of the various areas of the imperial city, as well as various ceramic objects and remains (including Inca mummies).

=== Iglesia San Pedro Apóstolo ===
This church in the Plaza Constitución was built on Inca foundations and was rebuilt after an earthquake in 1950. In recent times, the Instituto Nacional de Cultura (INC), in a controversial move, demolished the church in order to reconstruct it in its original colonial style.

=== Inca complex ===
Overlooking the town is this large complex covering over 65.5 hectares which stretches at varying elevations between 3,446 metres (11,306 ft) and 3,514 metres (11,529 ft) above sea level for approximately kilometre along a mountain ridge sandwiched between the Kitamayu River (to the west) and the Chongo River (to the east), which are tributaries of the Vilcanota.

=== Jardín Botanico ===
Also known as the Felipe Marin Moreno Botanic Garden, this is located in an old enclosed colonial garden. It was created in 1917 by Felipe Marín Moreno, a Peruvian botanist and explorer who used the garden to experiment with various plants. He built up his collection over many years through correspondence with various institutions and botanists around the world from whom he received samples and seeds. After the garden was declared part of Peru's historical heritage by the Minister of Culture, Felipe Marín's son José has opened it to the public.

=== Pisac Market ===
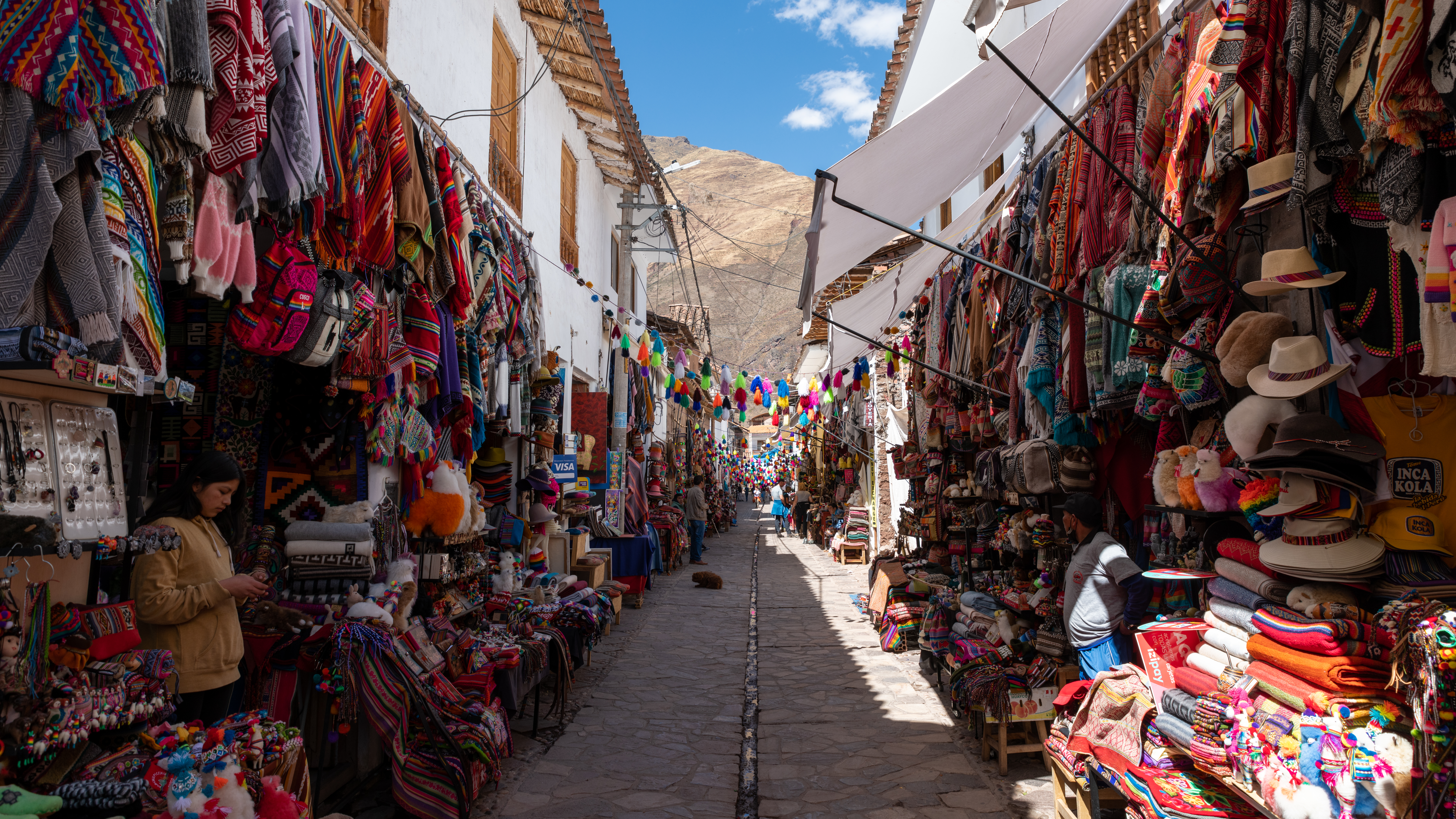
The Pisac Market

Pisac is known far and wide for its market, with a large section of the market is dedicated to tourist-oriented souvenir stalls. Official market days are Tuesday, Thursday and Sunday and it has taken over Pisac to such an extent that it fills the Plaza Constitución and surrounding streets every day. The market is at its biggest on Sunday when indigenous Quechua communities from the surrounding area come to town to sell their produce (much of which are completely organic) and stock up on supplies for the week.

=== Ñusta Encantada ===
Located on the road to the south, that leads to the Ñustayoc hill is a rock formation which according is legend is the remains of the Princess Inquill carrying bags on her back. According to Inca legend it is said that the chief Huayllapuma and his people suffered from attacks by the Antis, who took the opportunity in the rainy season to invade the kingdom. The Incas, their allies, could not help, as they were unable to cross the Vilcanota river when it was high during the rainy season. The chief had a daughter called Inquill (Inkill) Chumpi who the oracle Wankar Kuichi had prophesied that only a prince who could build a bridge over the river in one night would marry her.

As a result she turned down many suitors until one day, Asto Rimaq, son of the kuraka of the Wallas, kingdom of the mysterious Antisuyo, arrived. The young man brought him many wonderful gifts, however, none were like the Qoriqenqe, a beautiful bird with golden plumage, with blue, yellow and red stripes, which revealed the future with its sweet song. Upon learning of Wankar Kuichi's prophecy, the Qoriqenqe declared that the bridge would be built in a single night and that the stones would detach themselves from the quarries. The two were instructed to cross the river with Asto Rimaq staying on the river bank while Inquill was to go up the slope carrying bags of the best coca, kissing them constantly as she let the leaves fall as a sacred offering to the ground until reaching the top. He was emphatic in stating that if she turned to look, the two would never see each other again, and the hope of their people would be dead.

She promised to follow the bird's instructions and, after crossing the river, started to climb up the slope. As soon as the first handful of coca fell, a tremor was felt that grew until it became a resounding movement. The stones dropped off by themselves and the blocks flew over the water. Its walk moved the environment as if it had life. Some rubbed against each other and the contact produced lightning and lightning. Suddenly, everything stopped, all at once. It was then that Inquill gave in to curiosity and, turning to look, was turned to stone, while Asto Riqmaq was drowned by the river.

=== Sanctuario del Senor de Huanca (Sanctuary of the Lord of Huanca) ===
This Christian shrine which was established in the 18th century was officially opened by Bishop Manuel Peralta y Moscoso in the year 1779. The shrine is located approximately 8 kilometres (5.0 mi) southeast of Pisac in the district of San Salvador. Pilgrims travel to the shrine every September.

== Gallery ==
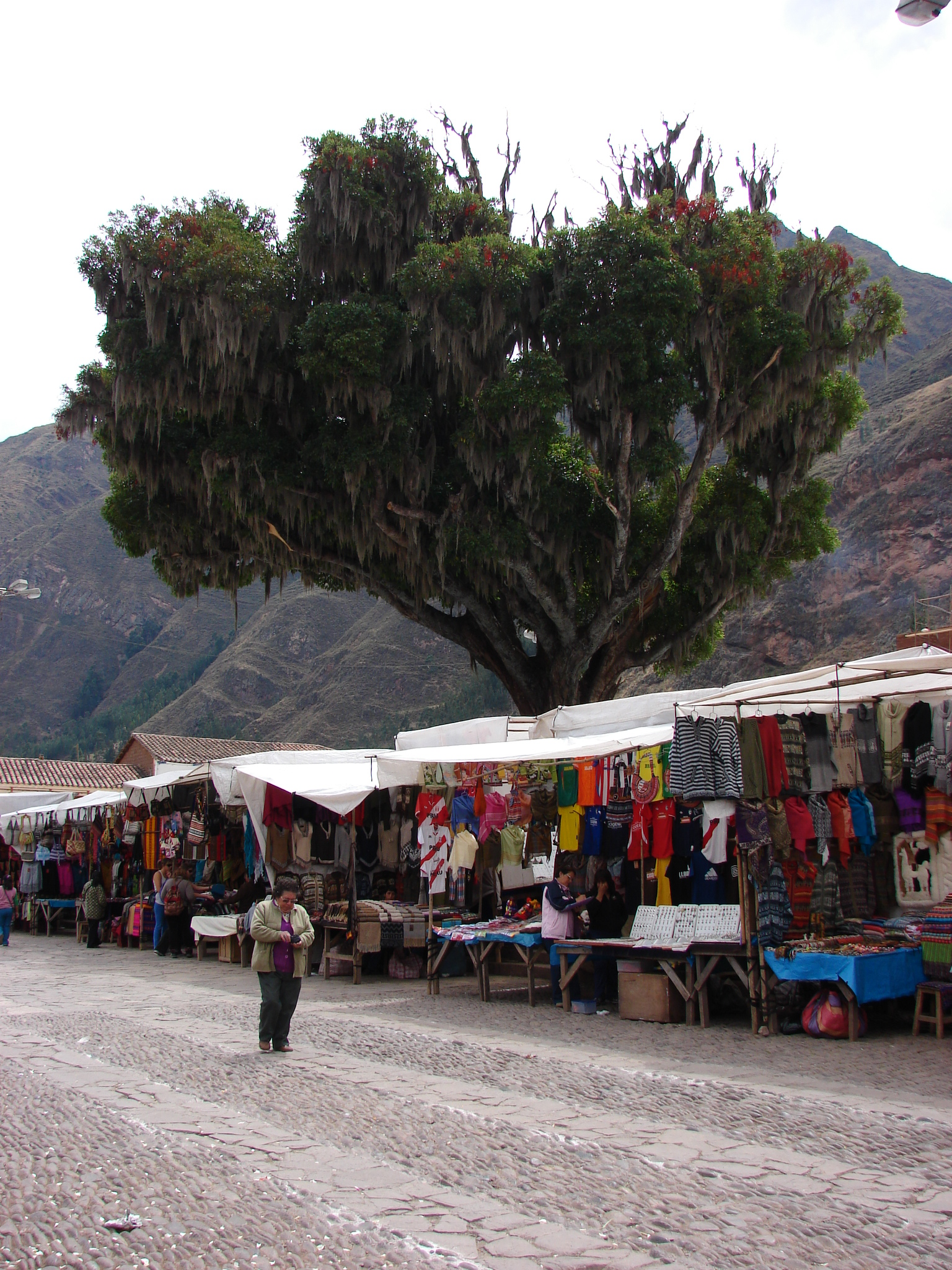
Pisac main market.

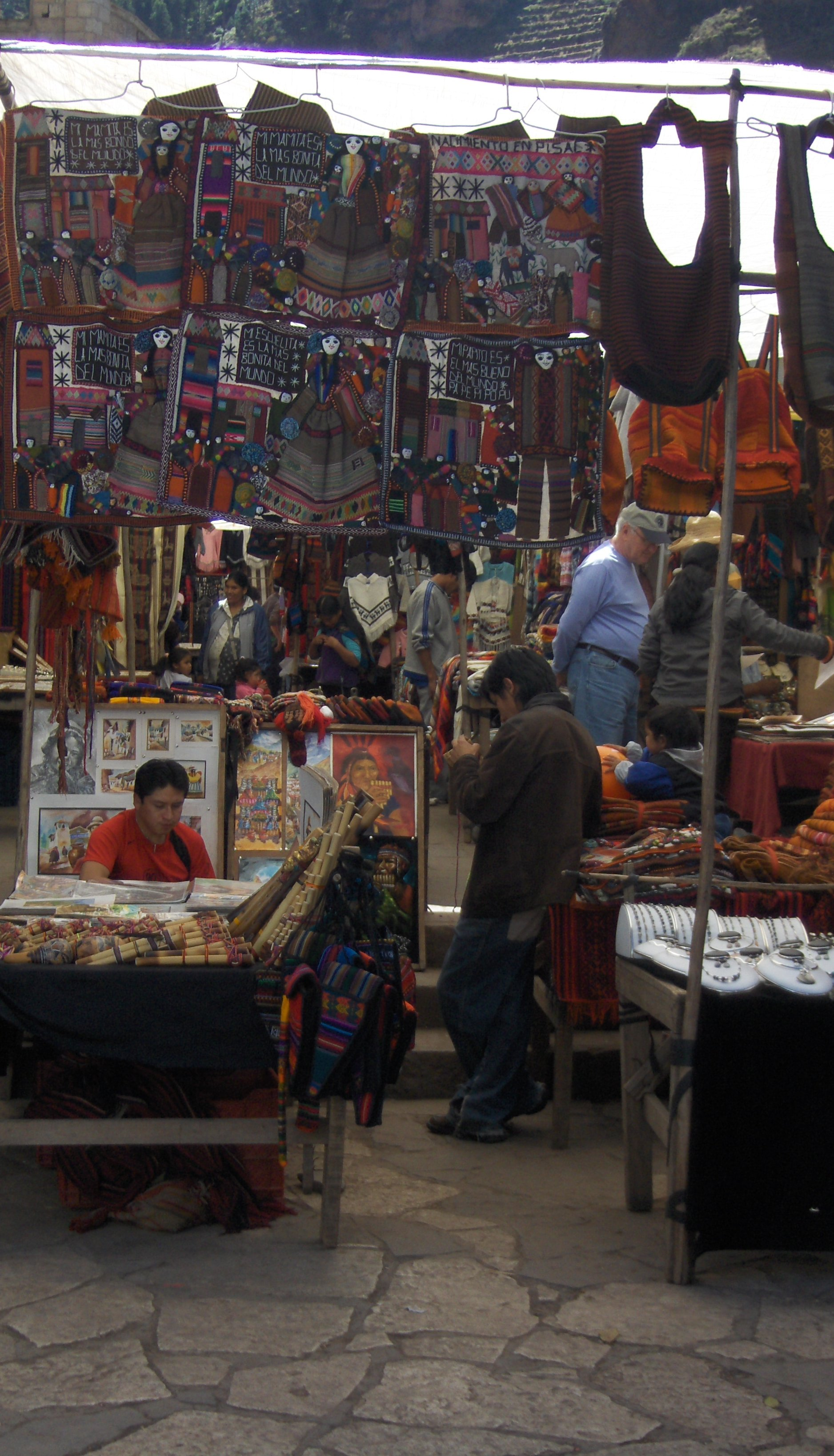
The market sells typical Andean crafts

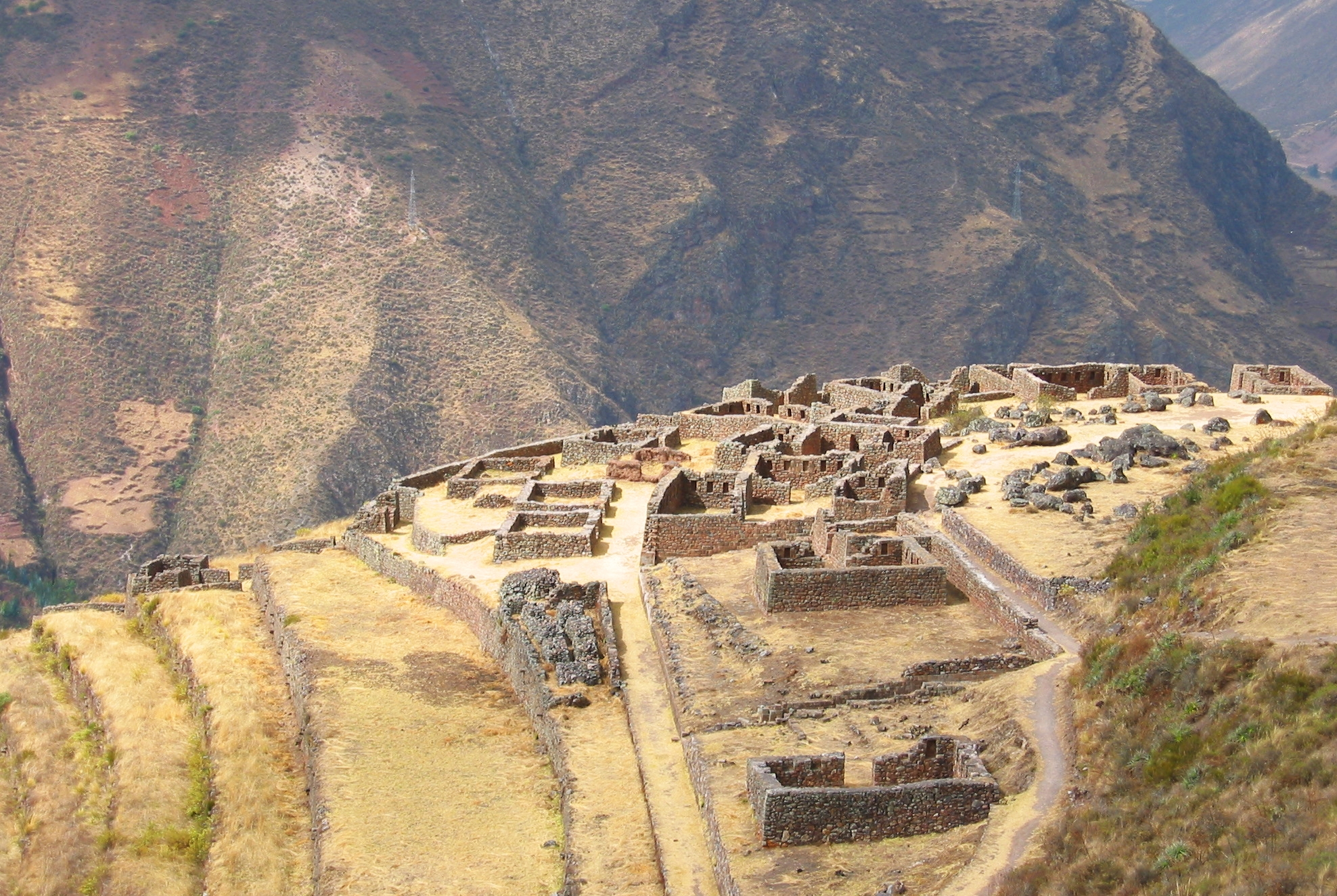
The Pisaq'a residential area in the Inca complex.

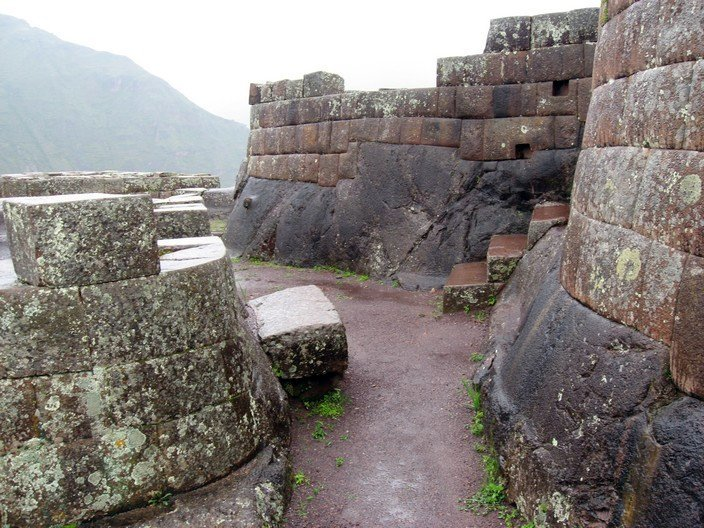
Structures in the urban sector of the Inca complex at Pisac

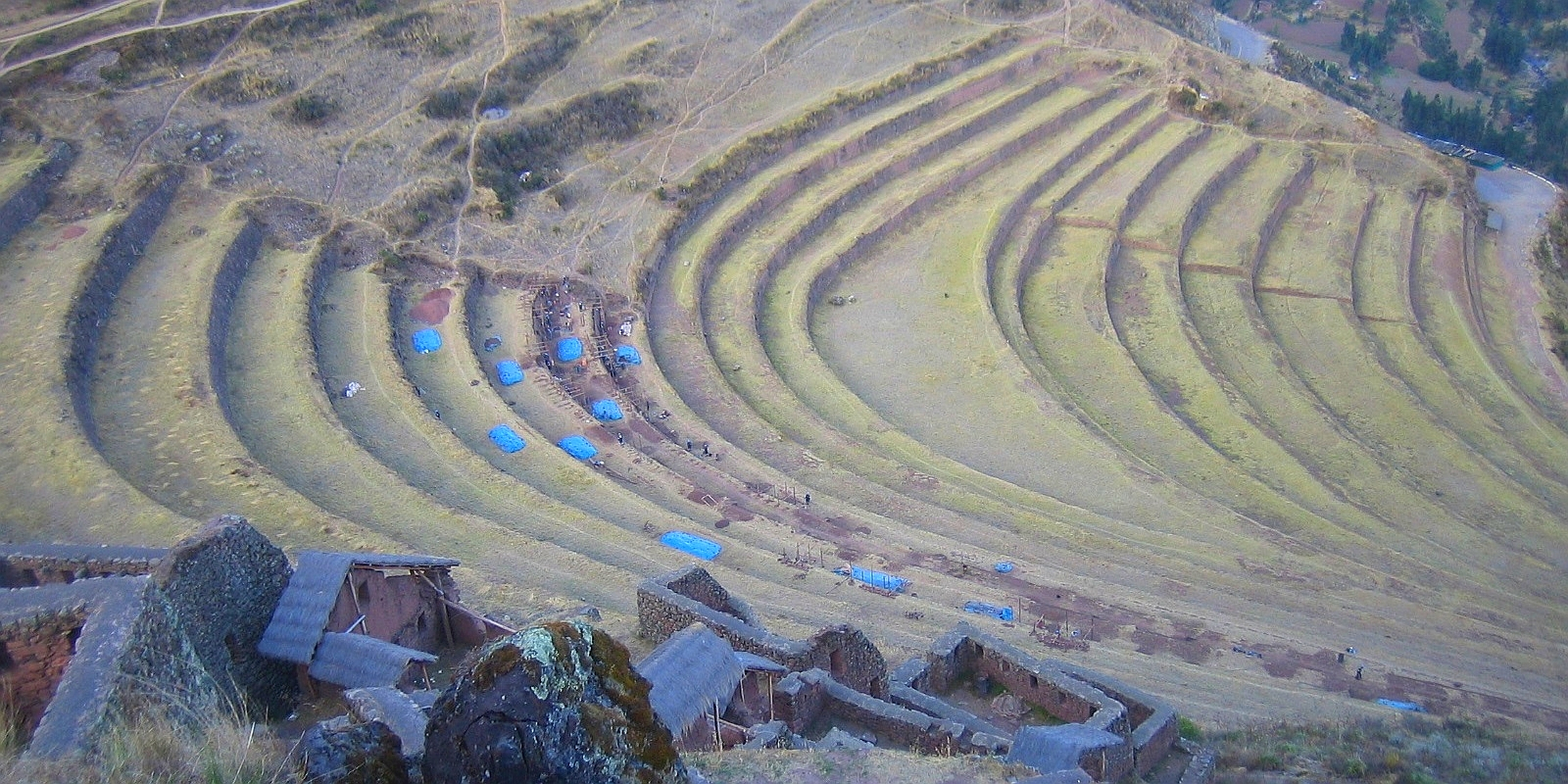
View from the Qallaq'asa residential area of the Inca complex towards some of the andenes (terraces)

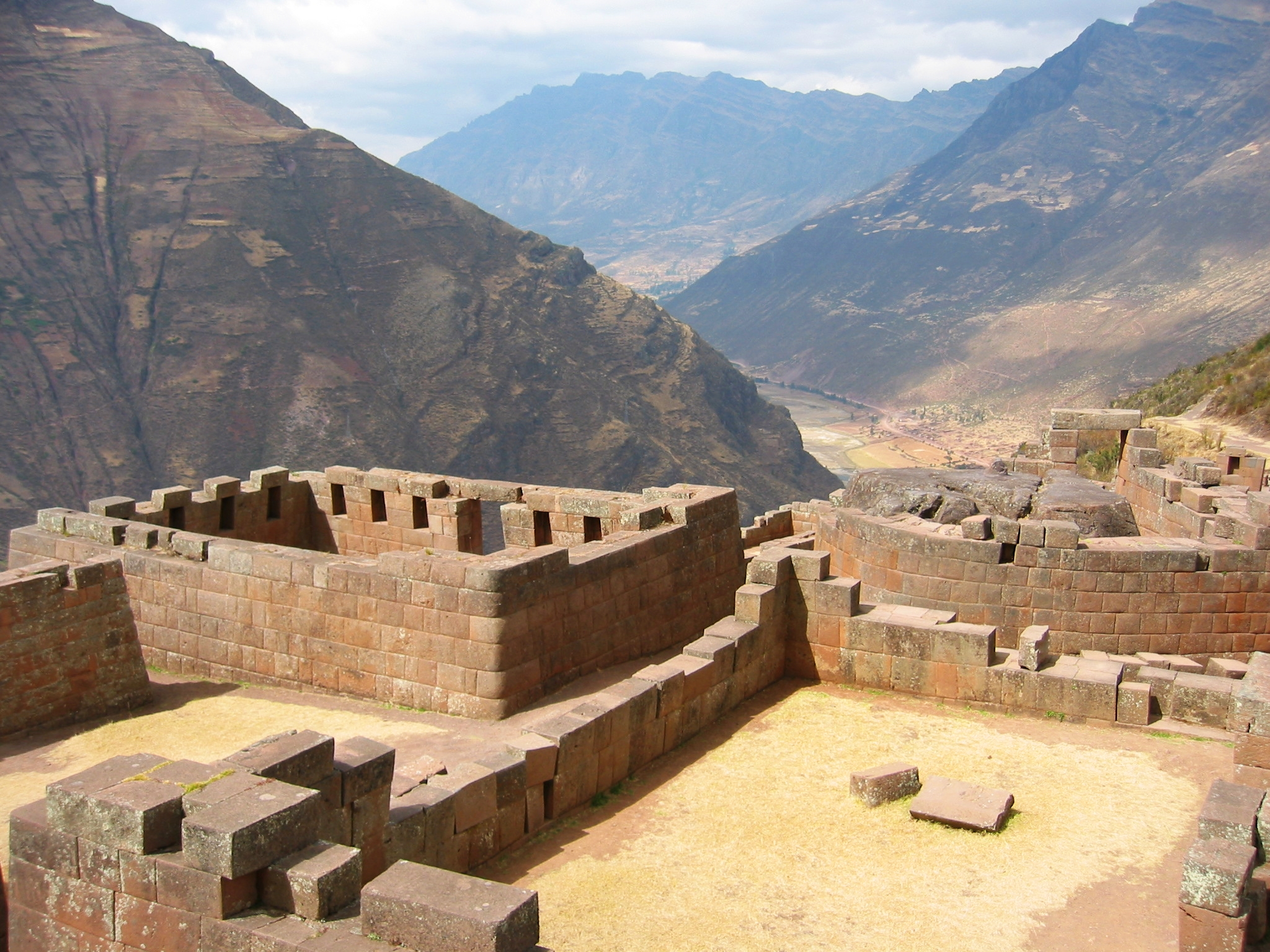
View of the Sacred Valley from Intiwatana ceremonial and religious area of the Inca complex.

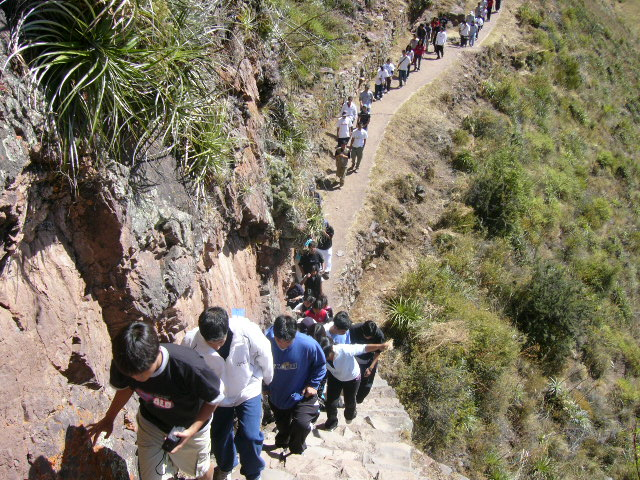
Footpath at the Inca complex

== See also ==
- Ichhunayuq
- Machu Kuntur Sinqa
- Willka Raymi
