= Willka Raymi =

Peruvian Feast

Willka Raymi (Quechua willka grandchild / great-grandson / lineage / minor god in the Inca culture, an image of the Willkanuta valley worshipped as God / holy, sacred, divine, willka or wilka Anadenanthera colubrina (a tree), raymi feast) is a feast celebrated in the Cusco Region in Peru. It is the representation of the traditional offering ceremony to Pachamama. The celebrations are held annually on August (24th) in the archaeological complex of Pisac.

== See also ==
- Pachamama Raymi
