= Killke culture =

Pre-Incan Peruvian culture

Killke Culture
- 900 AD–1200 AD
- Status: Civilization
- Historical era: Late Intermediate Period
  - Established: 900 AD
  - Disestablished: 1200 AD

The Killke culture occupied the South American region around Cusco, Peru, from 900 to 1200 AD, prior to the development of Incan culture in the 13th century.

Killke culture flourished in highland Peru in the Late Intermediate Period around what is now Cusco. Archaeologist Oscar Rodriguez suggests that the Killke built small sections of the fortress Saksaywaman during the 12th century, prior to the Incan expansion of the site.

In 2008, excavations uncovered a temple on the edge of the fortress, indicating religious as well as military use of the site.

John H. Rowe, who named the Killke culture, first described killke ceramics. These vessels are often globular with vertical strap handles and have simple linear geometric decorations of black or black-on-red over a white or buff slip.

== See also ==
- Wari culture
- History of the Incas

== Bibliography ==
- Dwyer, E. B. 1971. The Early Inca Occupation of the Valley of Cuzco, Peru. Unpublished PhD thesis, University of California, Berkeley.
- Ixer, R. A. "The Petrography of Certain Pre-Spanish Pottery from Peru," https://web.archive.org/web/20111113233438/http://www.goodprovenance.com/incapots.htm. Accessed 15 March 2008.
