= Machu Kuntur Sinqa =

Mountain in Peru

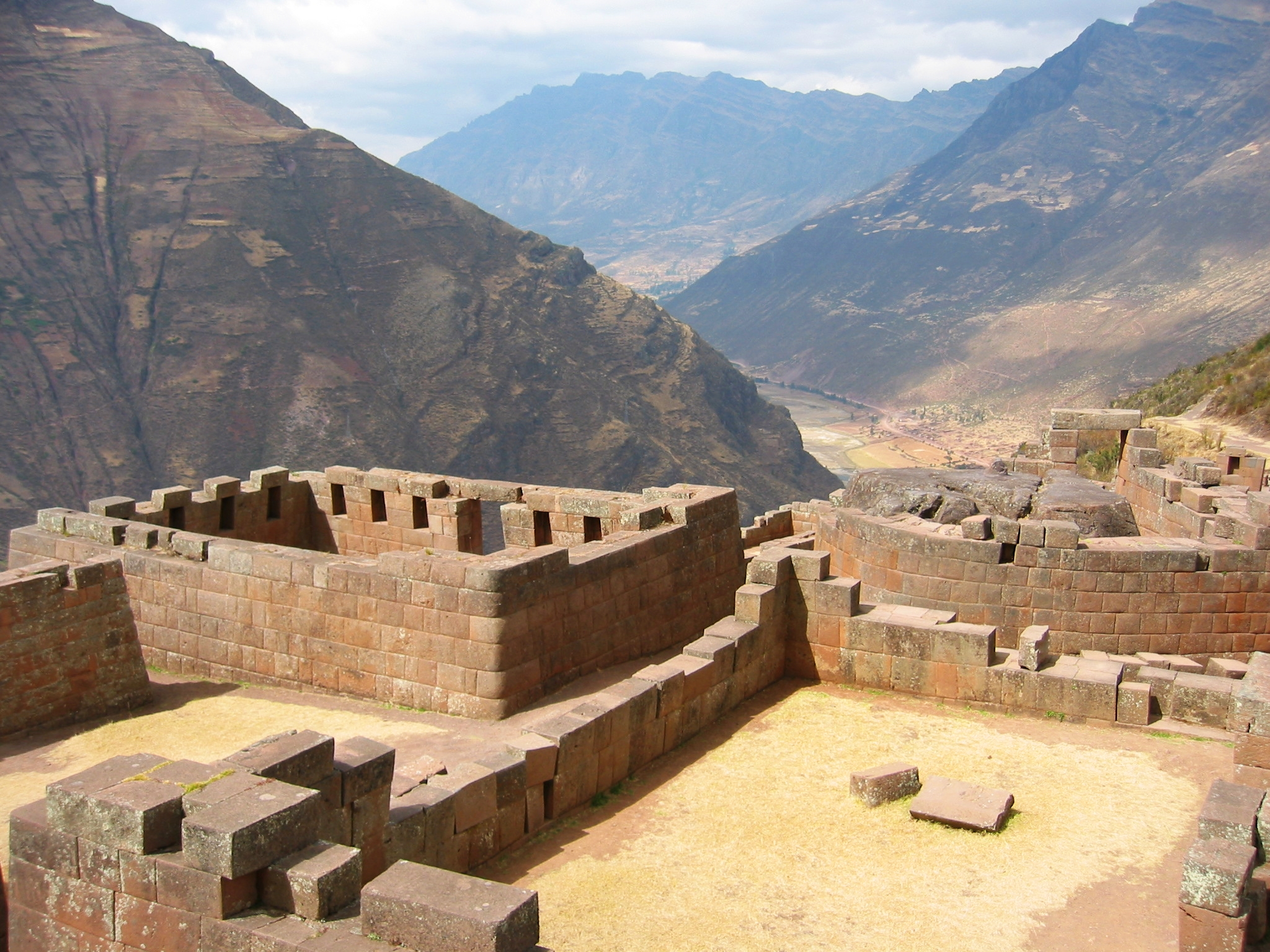
- View of the Sacred Valley with the Willkanuta River from Inti Watana. Machu Kuntur Sinqa is on the left.

Highest point
- Elevation: 4,200 m (13,800 ft)
- Coordinates: 13°26′18″S 71°48′38″W

Naming
- Language of name: Quechua

Geography
- Location within Peru
- Location: Peru, Cusco Region, Calca Province
- Parent range: Andes

Machu Kuntur Sinqa (Quechua machu old, kuntur condor, sinqa nose, also spelled Machucóndor Senqa) or Machu Kuntur Sankha (sankha cliff, Hispanicized Machucóndor Sanga) is a mountain in the Cusco Region in Peru, about 4,200 metres (13,780 ft) high. It is situated in the Calca Province, on the border of the districts Pisac and San Salvador. Machu Kuntur Sinqa lies on the right bank of the Willkanuta River, near the archaeological park of Pisac.
