= Urubamba =

Urubamba (possibly from Quechua for "spider's plain") may refer to:

== Places ==
- Urubamba Province, Peru
  - Urubamba District
    - Urubamba, Peru
- Urubamba River, in Peru
- Urubamba Valley, Peru
- Urubamba mountain range, Peru
  - Veronica (mountain), in Urubamba mountain range

== Music ==
- Urubamba (band), a South-American music group that recorded with Paul Simon
