= Sutoc =

Mountain in Peru

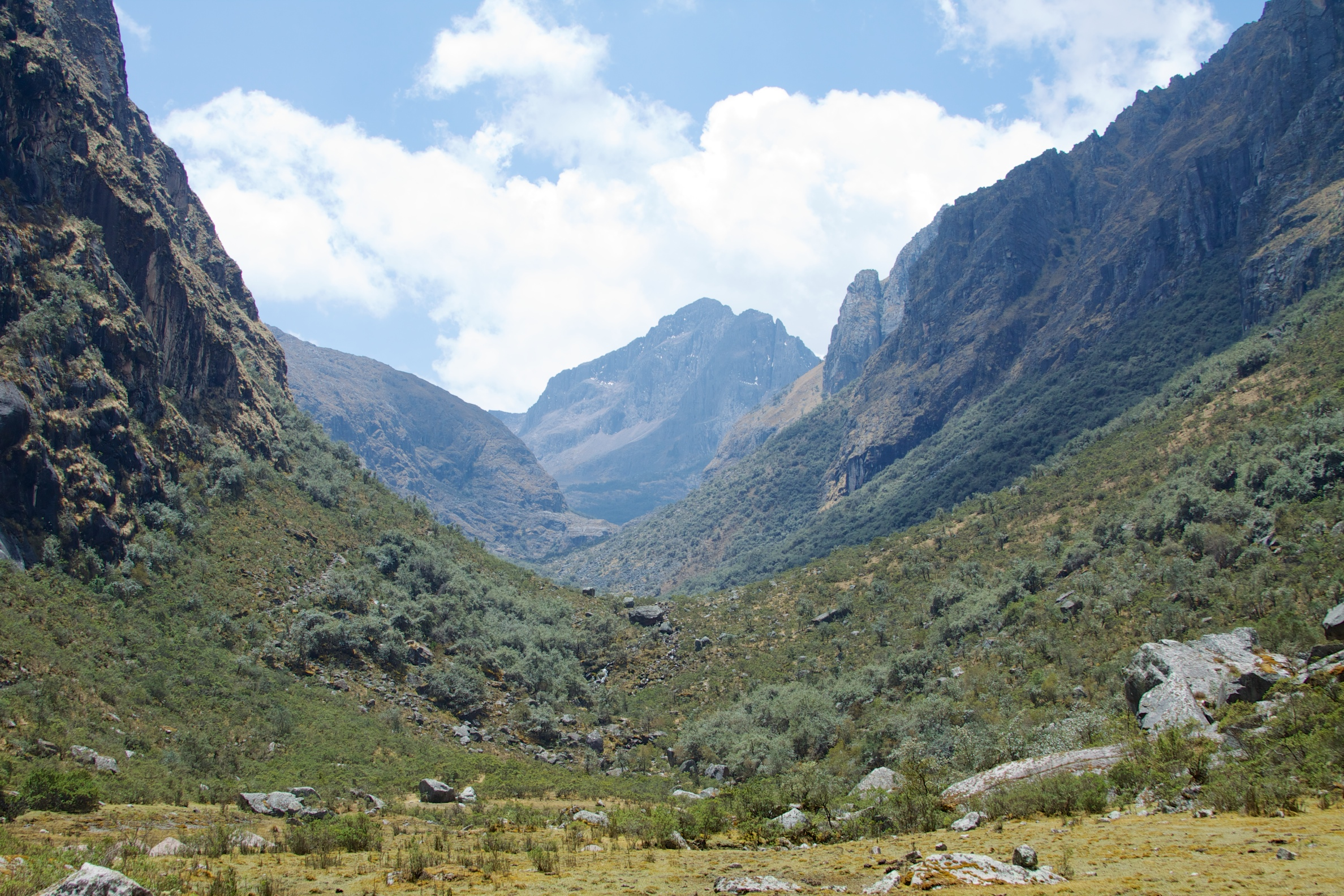
- Looking towards Pumahuancajasa from southeast of Pucajasa. The eastern slope of Sutoc is on the left.

Highest point
- Elevation: 4,735 m (15,535 ft)
- Coordinates: 13°13′17″S 72°06′56″W

Naming
- Language of name: Quechua

Geography
- Location within Peru
- Location: Peru, Cusco Region
- Parent range: Andes, Urubamba

Sutoc (possibly from Quechua sut'u drop; point, -q a suffix, "drippy" or "point-shaped") is a 4,735-metre-high (15,535 ft) mountain in the Urubamba mountain range in the Andes of Peru. It is located in the Cusco Region, Urubamba Province, Urubamba District. It lies southwest of Pucajasa and the pass named Pumahuancajasa (Quechua for "Pumahuanca pass") and southeast of Pumahuanca.
