= Quispiguanca =

Archaeological site in Peru

Coordinates: 13.1805°S 72.0645°W

Quispiguanca, also Q'espihuanca and Q'espiwanka, was a royal estate of the Inca emperor Huayna Capac (c. 1464–1525 CE). The ruins of the estate are located in the northern part of the present-day town of Urubamba, Peru at an elevation of 2,910 metres (9,550 ft).

== Background ==
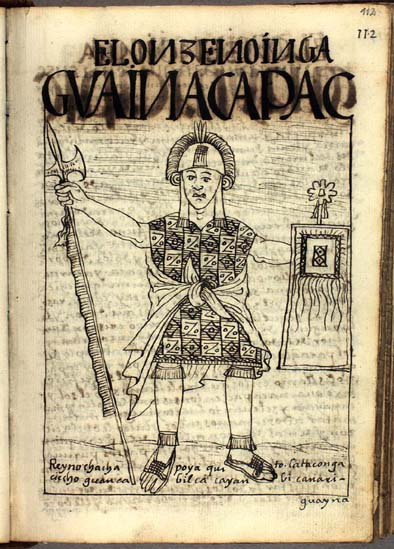
Huayna Capac

Inca emperors customarily acquired large royal estates to increase their power and wealth and that of their descendants who inherited the estates. Royal estates served as elegant country palaces and, at times, fortresses to fend off rivals for power. The ruins of other royal estates, notably Huchuy Qosqo and Machu Picchu are scattered up and down the Urubamba or Yucay Valley, commonly called the Sacred Valley.

The Sacred Valley was a popular area for royal estates. It was within about 30 kilometres (19 mi) of the Inca capital of Cuzco, but at lower elevations and with a warmer climate. Maize, the prestige crop of the Incas, could be grown in the Sacred Valley, whereas the climate nearer Cuzco was mostly too cold for maize cultivation. The Sacred Valley was also the closest route to reach the coca growing area in the lower Urubamba River valley. Water is abundant in the Sacred Valley due to precipitation in the snow-covered Andes which rise to elevations of more than 5,000 metres (16,000 ft) on the northern side of the narrow valley.

== The Royal Estate ==
The estate of Huayna Capac extended for 15 kilometres (9.3 mi) up and down the Sacred Valley. Four ethnic groups, the Pacos, Chichos, Cachis, and Chaocas, lived on the lands that became the royal estate, and continued to be employed as yanakunas on the estate after it was founded. Huayna Capac also brought in 2,000 outsiders, under the mitma system, to resettle and work on the estate. According to Spanish sources, he also assembled a workforce of 150,000 men to undertake the monumental tasks of re-routing the Urubamba River to the south side of the valley, draining swamps, building agricultural terraces (andenes), irrigation canals, roads and bridges, ponds and parks, and constructing his palace at Quispiguanca, plus other secondary palaces.

When finished, the estate consisted mostly of extensive fields of maize, potatoes, and chile peppers, as well as crops imported from other parts of the empire such as coca, peanuts, cotton, and sweet potatoes. Forests were planted or managed as hunting preserves for the emperor and sources of firewood and construction material. Not all the land within the estate belonged to the emperor. He granted some land to his mother, other relatives, his wives, religious organizations, and a group of aclla, the sequestered women of the Incas who were often compared by the Spanish to Catholic nuns.

== Ruins of Quispiguanca ==
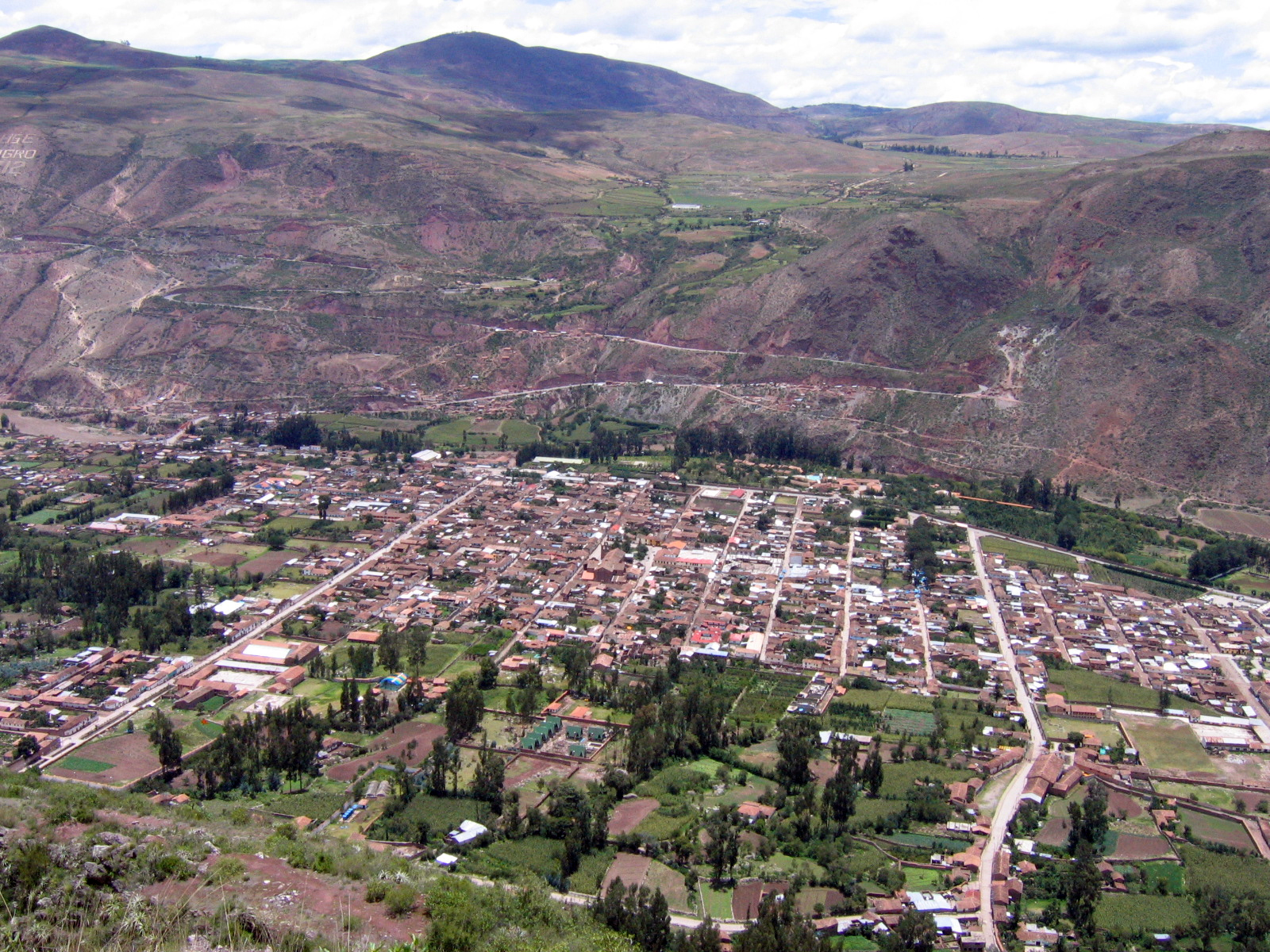
The town of Urubamba in 2004. The ruins are located at the lower left of this photo.

The site of Huayna Capac's palace of Quispiguanca consisted in the early 21st century of a modern cemetery and fields of carrots and cilantro. The archaeological remains consist of a terrace, a well—preserved wall, gatehouses on the east side of the site, and several structures in poor condition in the northern third of the site. Most of the construction is of fitted stonework, although some adobe and plaster were also used.

The original palace compound was rectangular and measured within its walls 189 metres (620 ft) north-south and 125 metres (410 ft) east-west. A terrace about 4 metres (13 ft) in height leveled the area within the walls. The northernmost part of the compound consists of agricultural terraces and the stone foundation of a great hall, measuring 14 metres (46 ft) by 44 metres (144 ft). A similar great hall existed nearby, along with associated smaller buildings. The central part of the compound is a large open plaza, comprising the majority of the area of the site, with a large white rock near its center. The rock possibly had religious significance, and a small Catholic chapel at the exact center of the plaza may overlay an Inca religious structure.

== Spanish rule ==
The Spanish conquistador of the Inca Empire, Francisco Pizarro, appropriated the estate of Huayna Capac as his encomienda in the 1530s. The inhabitants of the estate worked thereafter for Pizarro, contributing at first their labor as they had during the reign of Huayna Capac and later a fixed amount from their agricultural production. After Pizarro was killed in 1541, a Cañari Indian named Francisco Chilche claimed to be the overlord (cacique) of much of the land of the Quispiguanca estate. He fended off Indian rivals and the claims of Spaniards who sought land in the valley. (The Cañari had been allies of the Spanish during the overthrow of the Inca Empire and thus had legal standing with the Spanish.) Chilche continued to be important into the 1570s when he recruited 500 Indian soldiers to fight with the Spanish in their war against the last Inca, Tupac Amaru.

The population of Quispiguanca declined rapidly during the Spanish period due to the ravages of European diseases and civil wars. In 1551, the population of the estate was 800 people, compared to 2,000 mitma families settled there during Huayna Capac's reign.
