= Hatun Suyu Q'asa =

Mountain in Peru

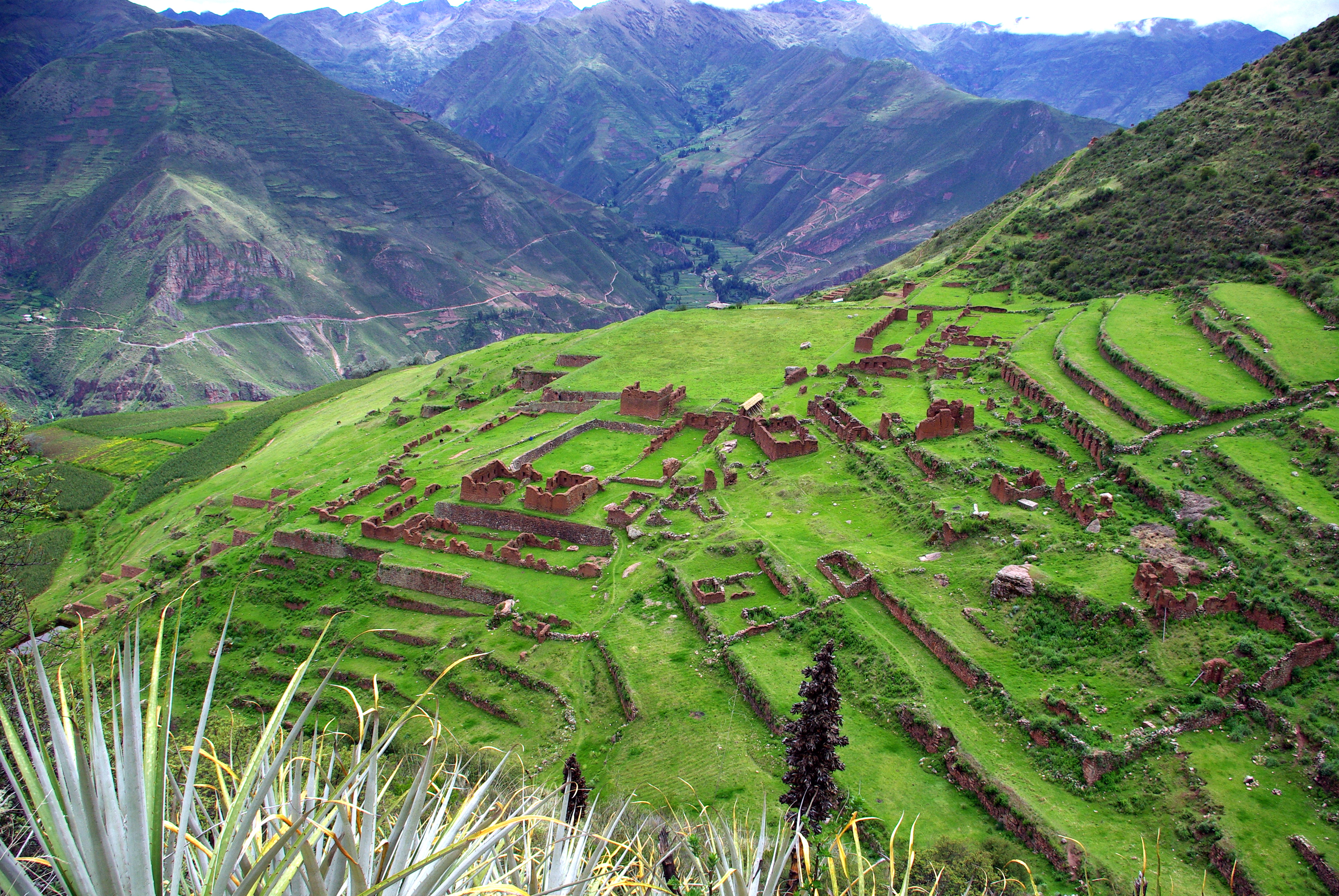
- Hatun Suyu Q'asa (center) and the Willkapampa valley as seen from the archaeological site of Huch'uy Qusqu

Highest point
- Elevation: 4,400 m (14,400 ft)
- Coordinates: 13°21′21″S 71°51′44″W

Geography
- Location within Peru
- Location: Peru
- Parent range: Andes

Hatun Suyu Q'asa (Quechua hatun big, suyu region, q'asa mountain pass, "big region pass", also spelled Jatunsuyocasa) is a mountain in the Andes of Peru, about 4,400 m (14,436 ft) high. It is located in the Cusco Region, Calca Province, on the border of the districts of Coya and Lamay. It lies southeast of Lamay between the Willkapampa valley and the Yanamayu ("black river", Yanamayo).
