= William Luna =

Peruvian singer-songwriter and composer (born 1967)

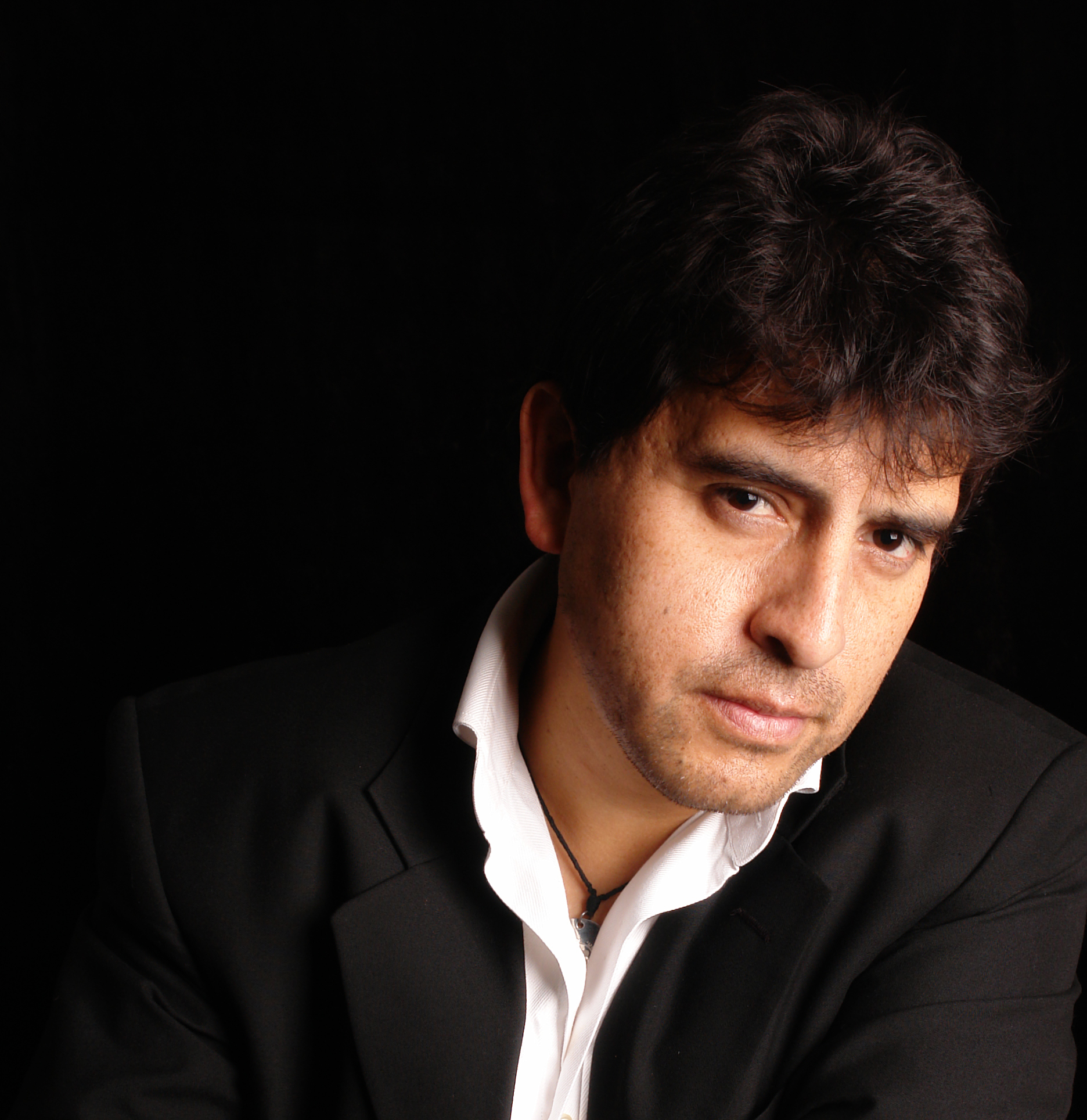

Background information
- Born: William Luna Moscoso; 14 December 1967 (age 58); Cusco, Peru
- Genres: Andean music, folk, Christian music
- Occupations: singer-songwriter, composer
- Instruments: Vocals, guitar
- Years active: 1978–present

William Luna Moscoso (born 14 December 1967) is a Peruvian singer-songwriter and composer associated with Andean music.

== Early life and education ==
Luna was born in Cusco to William Luna Rosas and María Moscoso Ojeda. He spent his childhood in the historic centre of Cusco and in the Andean town of Yucay. He studied at the Salesian School of Cusco, where he was educated by Jesuit and Salesian clergy, and completed his secondary education at the Colegio Nacional de Ciencias del Cusco. During his school years, he sang in his parish's Sunday choir. At the age of eleven, he studied English and, encouraged by his mother and his exposure to English-language music, learned it before learning Quechua.

At the age of fourteen, he learned to play the guitar and began setting to music songs he had started composing three years earlier. He later studied piano and enrolled at the Leandro Alviña Miranda Higher Institute of Music in Cusco, but did not complete his studies. He also attempted university studies at the National University of Saint Anthony the Abbot in Cuzco—in agrotechnics, zoology, biology and systems engineering—because he feared that music alone would not provide sufficient income.

== Career ==
=== Early career and international work ===
In his official biography, Luna described his childhood as the most important stage of his life, crediting it with shaping his sensitivity and his knowledge of the landscape around Cusco. According to a later interview, social prejudices against people from Cusco meant that Andean music was not initially his intended direction. He travelled to Santiago, Chile, to strengthen his Andean identity, recorded his first album there, and had his first hit with "Vienes y te vas". He later released a second album, whose song "Niñachay" won an award at the Latin American Festival of the Union of Peoples.

After returning to Peru, he released the album Mírame, which included "Vienes y te vas" and "Linda mi cholita". Press coverage associated the record with a contemporary Andean folklore style described as "trova andina", and Luna's career expanded in the following years.

Luna has performed in Peru, Bolivia, Chile, Colombia, Ecuador, Mexico, the Dominican Republic, the United States and Canada, and in European countries including Sweden, Spain, Germany, Italy, Belgium, France and Switzerland. Ecuador became one of his principal foreign bases: he appeared for five consecutive years at the Latin American festival Cantos de libertad in Quito and lived there for extended periods. A promotional tour arranged through Pedro Francisco and Jaime Rojas of Orccus included television appearances in Guayaquil and a later stop in Vinces, but it did not lead to a lasting exclusivity agreement.

In 2005, he performed in Vancouver at the Norman Rothstein Theatre. He was later invited to the United States by the United Nations for a forum of Indigenous peoples. He was also invited to perform at the Festival de la Cerveza Cusqueña. In 2006, he returned to Canada for the Latino Soy festival and later undertook his first European tour, including Spain and Italy. In 2007 he lived briefly in Stockholm, and in 2008 he appeared at Ecuador's Cantos por la Libertad festival alongside Los Kjarkas.

=== Christian music and other projects ===
Luna produced what was described as the first Andean symphonic concert in Peru and recorded the releases Lo mejor y nuevo de William Luna and Huaynos tradicionales En serio – Volumen 1. Around that period he converted to Pentecostal Christianity and recorded his first praise album, Refugio, followed by En el nombre de Jesús, which took him to the United States and Europe. He later established a Christian ministry called León de Judá in the Dominican Republic. He also had a minor role as a religious figure in the film La ciudad de los reyes, directed by Antonio Rugel.

=== Politics, collaborations and television ===
In 2011, Luna was invited by the political party Adelante, led by Rafael Belaúnde Aubry, and stood as a congressional candidate at the 2011 Peruvian general election. He was the most-voted candidate on Adelante's list in Lima and among overseas voters, but the party failed to clear the electoral threshold.

That same year, singer-songwriter Pepe Alva invited Luna to join Proyecto Kuska, a collaboration that brought together Luna, Max Castro, Diosdado Gaitán Castro and Alva. Press coverage identified "Pechito Corazón" as the project's first single and reported concerts in Buenos Aires as part of an international tour. Later coverage described "Valle" as the project's promotional single, with a video shot at Machu Picchu, and said the group planned to take the project across Peru and abroad.

In 2012, Luna recorded the song "Linda Wawita", composed by Juan Carlos Fernández, for the television series Al fondo hay sitio. The song became a success on social media. In 2013, he competed in the dance reality show El Gran Show.

== Recognition ==
In 2006, the Asociación Peruana de Autores y Compositores (Peruvian Association of Authors and Composers) named Luna "best folk singer".

== Discography ==
=== Mírame (1999) ===
1. Vienes y te vas
2. Linda la cholita
3. Chiriwayra (Quechua: "cold wind")
4. Willka ñusta (Quechua: "sacred princess")
5. Mírame
6. Full Mercedes-Benz
7. El gato gris
8. Te quiero esta noche
9. La mujer de otro hombre
10. Linda la cholita (karaoke)
11. Nuestra promesa (bonus track)

=== Romance andino (2000) ===
1. Sin tu amor
2. Nuestra promesa
3. Niñachay ("my little girl")
4. Amor herido
5. Malos caminos
6. Quisiera quererte
7. No me mientas
8. Qosqollay (Quechua: "my little Cusco")
9. De la nada
10. Sufrir y llorar
11. Vuelve
12. Déjate amar (bonus track)

=== Como si no supiera (2003) ===
1. Ama kiriwaychu mamita
2. Y tú no me extrañaras
3. La rotonda
4. No vuelvas más
5. Como si no supiera
6. Mi Valentín
7. Puno querido
8. Laguna de Paca
9. Un amor me está matando
10. Paisana
11. Si me dejas

=== Tu amor ajeno (2004) ===
1. Como una gota en sequía
2. Yo, tu enemigo
3. Tu amor ajeno
4. De Maras es mi amor
5. Me voy
6. Nada me queda
7. El sabor de tu engaño
8. Sin luz, sin mañana
9. Te amo
10. Te recordaré
11. Respira
12. Ella ya no me quiere
13. Milagro

=== Hasta el final (2005) ===
1. Acaso yo
2. Uchu luru ñawisitu
3. Hasta el final
4. Negra del alma
5. Garúa
6. El vuelo del kilincho
7. Valicha
8. Mantaro
9. Nadie me espera
10. Sunqullay (Quechua: "my little heart")
11. Si por mí fuera
12. Norma
13. Como una gota en la sequía (bonus track)

=== En vivo con la Orquesta Sinfónica (2006) ===
1. Linda mi cholita
2. Ama kiriwaychu mamita
3. Mírame
4. El vuelo del kilincho
5. De la nada
6. Hasta el final
7. Niñachay
8. Valicha
9. Sin tu amor
10. Respira
11. Vienes y te vas
12. Mi Valentín
13. Garúa
14. Acaso yo
15. Bonus track: Salvapantalla (Valentín Luna M.)

=== María María (2008) ===
1. Ella es mía
2. Si la vez
3. Parquecito regocijo
4. El vuelo del kilincho
5. A las orillas del Vilcanota
6. En mi tierra es Navidad
7. Luna, luna
8. María, María
9. Nosotros los tres
10. Viento y arena
11. Mi Valentín
12. ¡Ay! Mi mamacita
13. Ojalá
14. Dime destino

=== William Luna: Lo mejor en DVD (2008) ===
1. Niñachay
2. De la nada
3. No me mientas
4. Vienes y te vas
5. Nuestra promesa
6. Linda la cholita
7. Sin tu amor
8. Vuelve
9. Qosqollay
10. Amor herido
11. Hasta el final
12. Te quiero esta noche
13. Niñachay (karaoke)
14. Backstage (behind the scenes)
15. Linda cholita
16. Linda Wawita

=== Lo Nuevo y Lo Mejor (2014) ===
1. Lluvia
2. Niñachay
3. Tonta
4. Vienes y te vas
5. Ay mi mamacita
6. De la nada
7. Como si no supiera
8. Linda mi cholita
9. No hay dolor más fuerte que el alma
10. Mi Valentín
11. Ama kiriwaychu mamita
12. No me mientas
13. Acaso porque soy pobre
14. Hasta el final
15. Esquinita linda

== See also ==
- Peruvian music
- Andean music
