= Kimsaqucha (Lamay) =

Group of lakes in the Lamay District, Peru

- Location within Peru Location within South America
- Location: Peru; Cusco Region, Calca Province, Lamay District
- Coordinates: 13°17′20″S 71°53′44″W

Kimsaqucha (Quechua kimsa three, qucha lake, "three lakes", Hispanicized spelling Quimsacocha) is a group of lakes in Peru located in the Cusco Region, Calca Province, Lamay District. The lakes are situated northeast of Lamay and Calca and southwest of the larger lake Pampaqucha {Laguna Pampacocha) in the Calca District.
