= Ayawayq'u =

Archaeological site in Peru

- Yukay / Kapillayuq
- Interactive map of Ayawayq'u
- 13°19′13″S 72°05′36″W
- Location: Peru
- Region: Cusco Region, Urubamba Province

Site notes
- Height: 3,100 metres (10,171 ft)

Ayawayq'u (Quechua aya corpse, wayq'u valley, "corpse valley", also Ayawayq'o), also known as Yukay (Yucay) or Kapillayuq (Capillayoq) is an archaeological site with rock paintings in Peru. It is situated in the Cusco Region, Urubamba Province, Yucay District. The site lies at a height of about 3,100 metres (10,171 ft) on the southern side of the mountain Kapillayuq.

At a distance of about 800 metres (2,625 ft) from Ayawayq'u there is another site with rock art named T'uqu T'uquyuq.
