= Sacred Valley =

Valley in the Andes Mountains of Peru

- Urubamba Valley
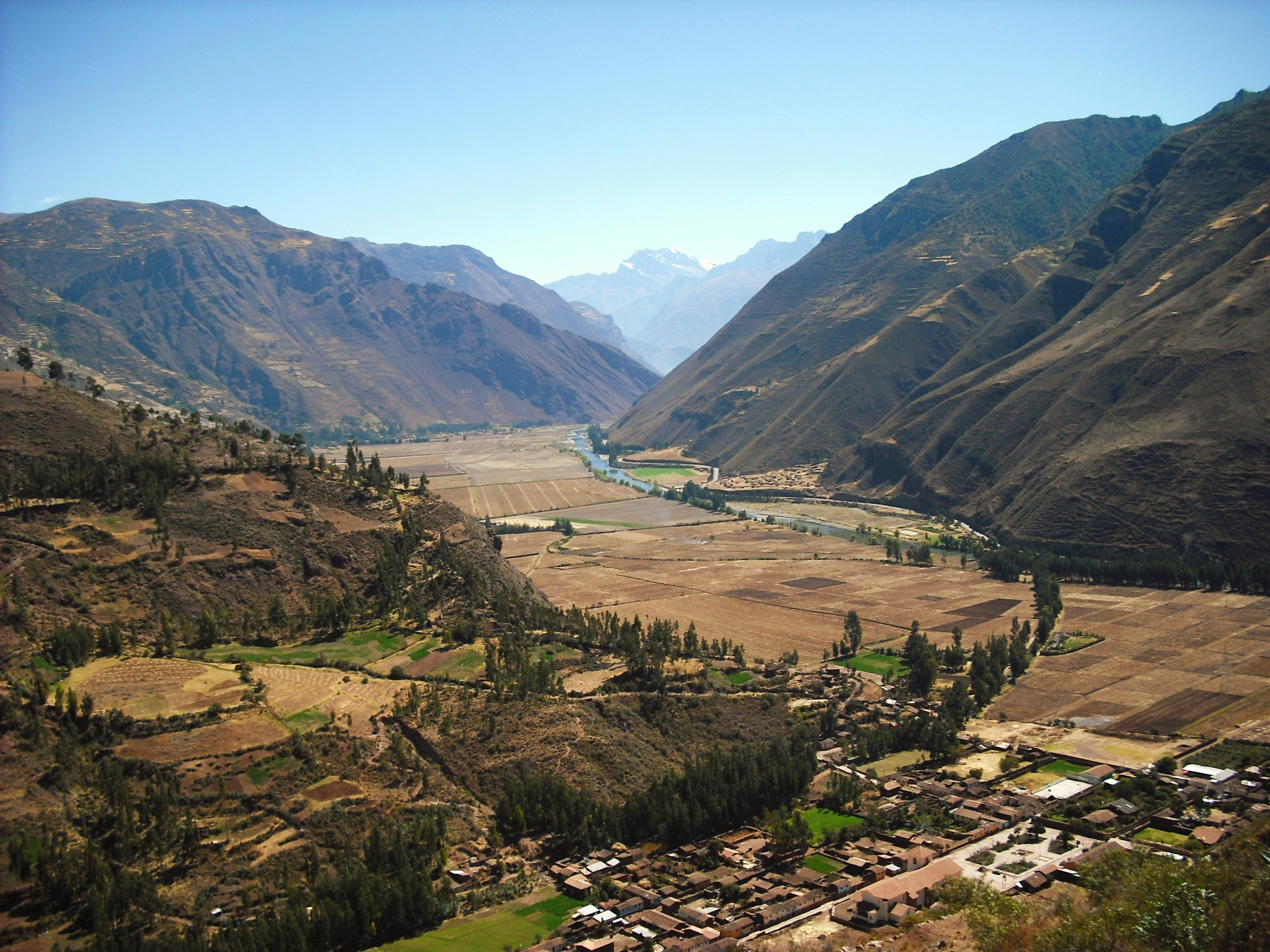
- Sacred Valley of the Incas

- Location within Peru

Geography
- Location: Cuzco Region, Peru
- Coordinates: 13°20′S 72°05′W
- River: Urubamba River
- Interactive map of Sacred Valley

Cultural Heritage of Peru
- Official name: Valle Sagrado de los Incas
- Type: Immovable tangible
- Criteria: Archaeological and Historical Cultural Landscape
- Designated: 22 June 2006; 20 years ago
- Legal basis: R.D.N. Nº 988/INC-2006

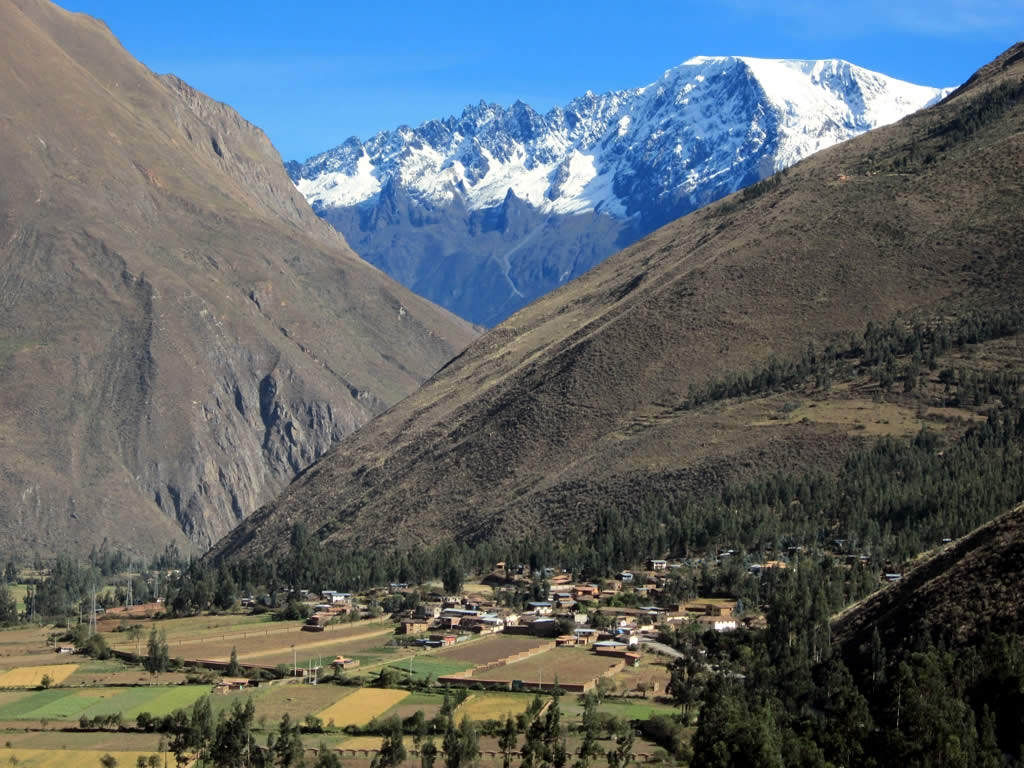
The mountain Veronica looms over the Sacred Valley.

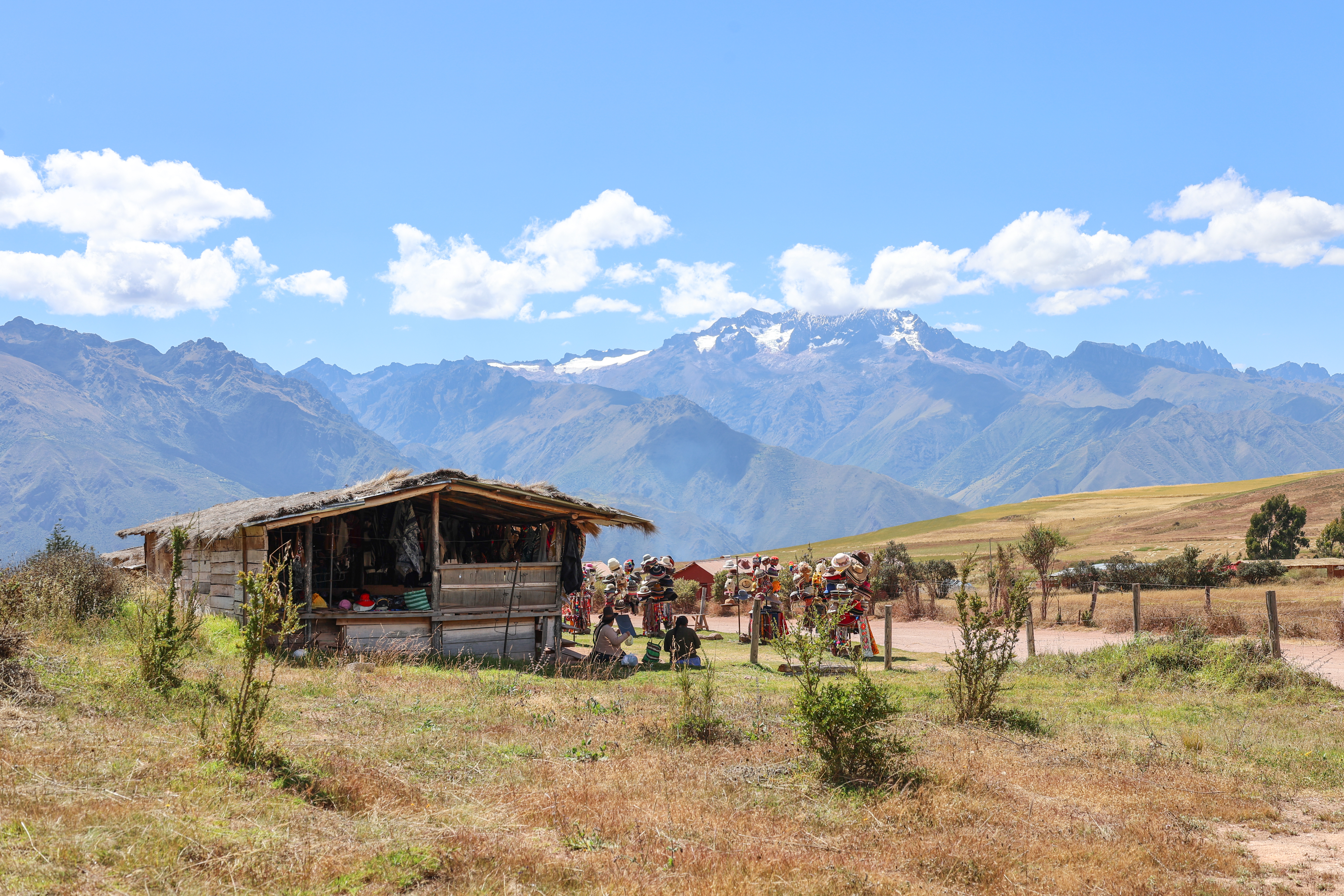
House in the Sacred Valley of the Incas with Chicón in the background

The Sacred Valley of the Incas (Spanish: Valle Sagrado de los Incas; Quechua: Willka Qhichwa), or the Urubamba Valley, is a valley in the Andes of Peru, north of the Inca capital of Cusco. It is located in the present-day Peruvian region of Cusco. In colonial documents it was referred to as the "Valley of Yucay". The Sacred Valley was incorporated slowly into the Inca Empire during the period from 1000 to 1400.

The Sacred Valley is a major tourist destination. In 2019, 1.6 million people, the majority non-Peruvians, visited Machu Picchu, its most famous archaeological site. Many of the same tourists also visited other archaeological sites and modern towns in the Sacred Valley.

Stretching from Pisac to Ollantaytambo, this fertile valley is irrigated by the Urubamba River. The Chanapata civilisation first utilised this area starting at around 800 BCE because of its rich soil used for agriculture. The Qotacalla civilization lived in the Sacred Valley from 500 to 900 CE. The Killke civilization then flourished in the Sacred Valley from 900 until it was absorbed into the Incan Empire in 1420. The Incan Empire ruled this area for little more than 100 years until the arrival of the Spanish.

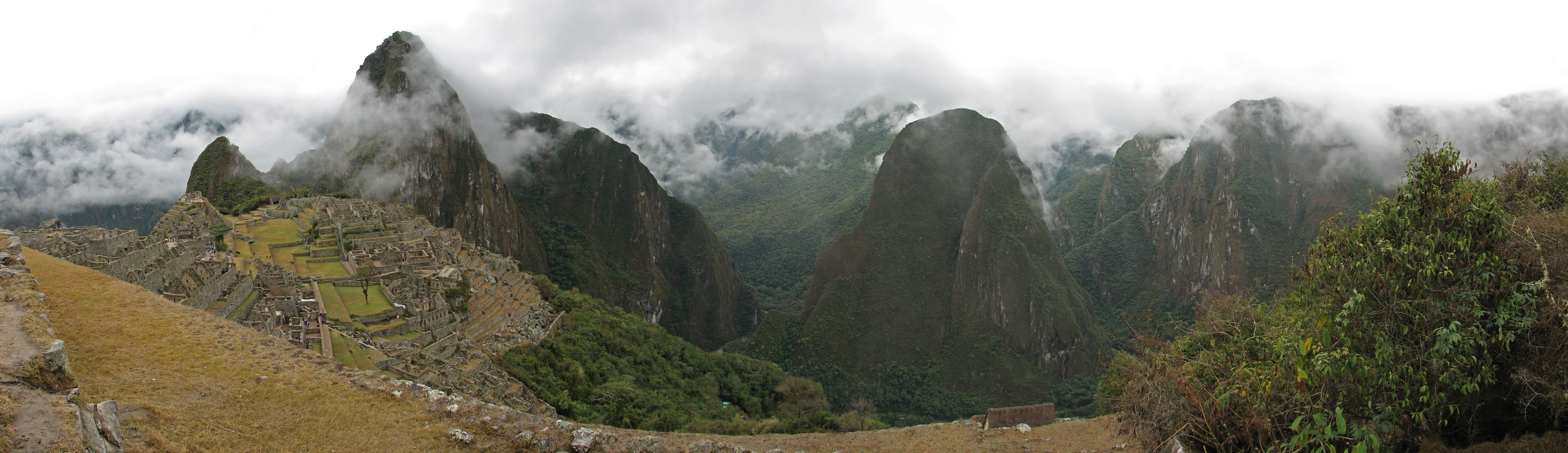
Machu Picchu

== Geography ==
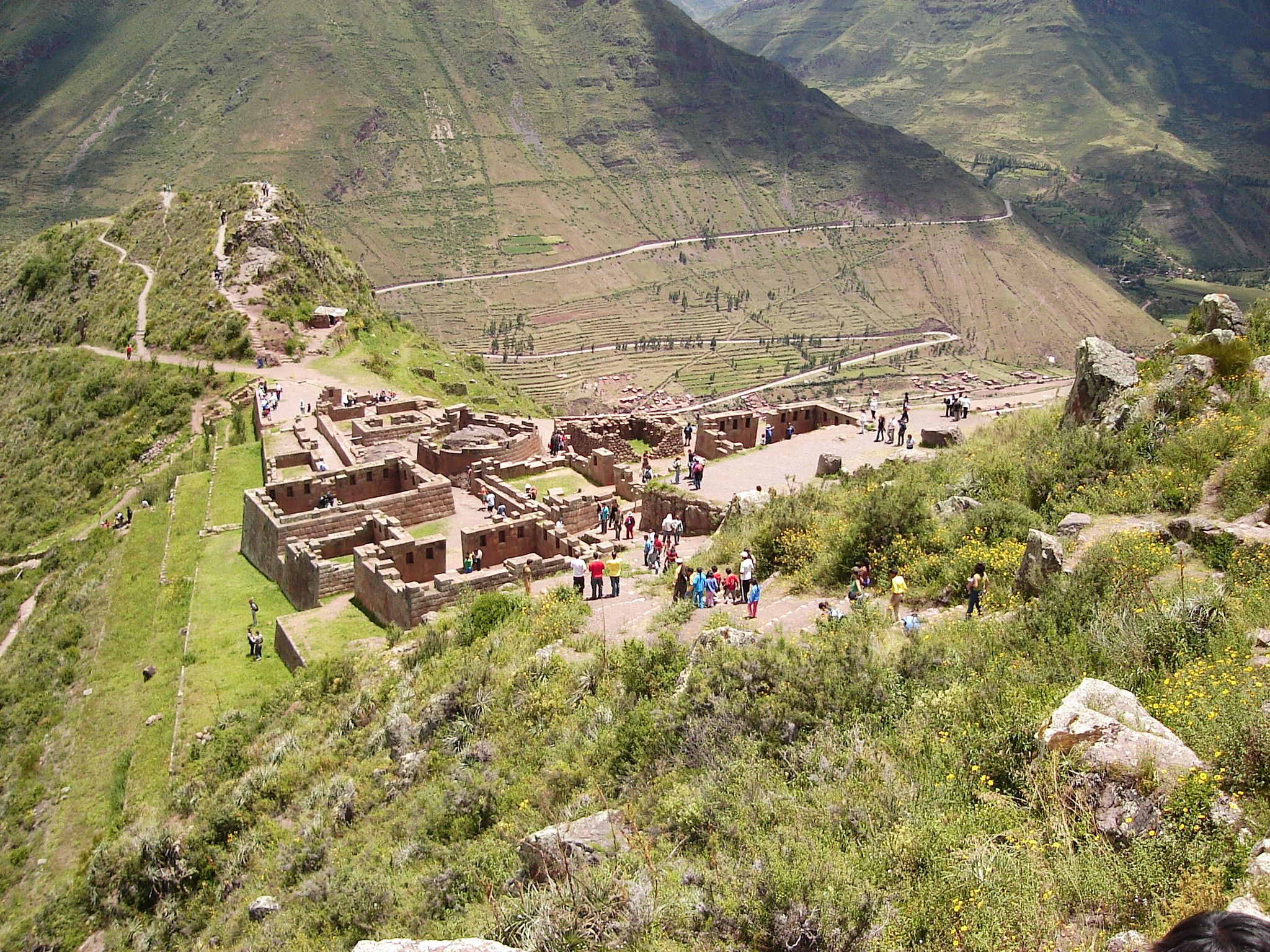
Inca ruin and andenes (agricultural terraces) at Pisac.

The valley, running generally west to east, is understood to include everything along the Urubamba River between the town and Inca ruins at Písac and Machu Picchu, 100 kilometres (62 mi) distant. The Sacred Valley has elevations above sea level along the river ranging from 3,000 metres (9,800 ft) at Pisac to 2,050 metres (6,730 ft) at the Urubamba River below the citadel of Machu Picchu. On both sides of the river, the mountains rise to much higher elevations, especially to the north where two prominent mountains overlook the valley: Sahuasiray, 5,818 metres (19,088 ft) and Veronica, 5,893 metres (19,334 ft) in elevation. The intensely cultivated valley floor is about 1 kilometre (0.62 mi) wide on average. Side valleys and agricultural terraces (andenes) expand the cultivatable area.

The valley was formed by the Urubamba river, also known as the Vilcanota River, Willkanuta River (Aymara, "house of the sun") or Willkamayu (Quechua). The latter, in Quechua, the still spoken lingua franca of the Inca Empire, means the sacred river. It is fed by numerous tributaries which descend through adjoining valleys and gorges and contains numerous archaeological remains and villages. The Sacred Valley was the most important area for maize production in the heartland of the Inca Empire and access through the valley to tropical areas facilitated the import of products such as coca leaf and chile peppers to Cuzco.

The climate of Urubamba is typical of the valley. Precipitation, concentrated in October through April, totals 527 millimetres (20.7 in) annually and monthly average temperatures range between 15.4 °C (59.7 °F) in November, the warmest month, to 12.2 °C (54.0 °F) in July, the coldest month. The Incas built extensive irrigation works throughout the valley to counter deficiencies and seasonality in precipitation.

== History ==
The early Incas lived in the Cusco area. By conquest or diplomacy, during the period 1000 to 1400 CE, the Inca achieved administrative control over the various ethnic groups living in or near the Sacred Valley.

The attraction of the Sacred Valley to the Inca, in addition to its proximity to Cusco, was probably that it was lower in elevation and therefore warmer than any other nearby area. The lower elevation permitted maize to be grown in the Sacred Valley. Maize was a prestige crop for the Incas, especially to make chicha, a fermented maize drink the Incas and their subjects consumed in large quantities at their many ceremonial feasts and religious festivals.

Chicha has had a long historical significance. In times of warfare, the Incas would take the decapitated skulls of their enemies and turn them into drinking vessels for chicha. This ceremonial process of drinking chicha from the head of a foe symbolized the successful transformation from the disorder of warfare to the order of the Incan Empire.

Large scale maize production in the Sacred Valley was apparently facilitated by varieties bred in nearby Moray, either a governmental crop laboratory or a seedling nursery of the Incas.

The Inca customarily divided conquered lands into three more-or-less equal parts. One part was for the emperor (the Sapa Inca), one part for the religious establishment, and one part for the communities of farmers themselves. In the 1400s, the Sacred Valley became an area of royal estates and country homes. Once a royal estate was created by an emperor it continued to be owned by descendants of the emperor after his death. The estate of the emperor Yawar Waqaq (c. 1380) was located at Paullu and Lamay (a few kilometers downstream from Pisac); Huchuy Qosqo, the estate of the emperor Viracocha Inca (c. 1410–1438), overlooks the Sacred Valley; the estate of Pachacuti (1438–1471) was at Pisac, and the sparse ruins of Quispiguanca, the estate of the emperor Huayna Capac (1493–1527) is in the town of Urubamba. Most archaeologists believe that Machu Picchu was built as an estate for Pachacuti.

Agricultural terraces, called andenes, were built up hillsides flanking the valley floor and are today the most visible and widespread signs of the Inca civilization in the Sacred Valley.

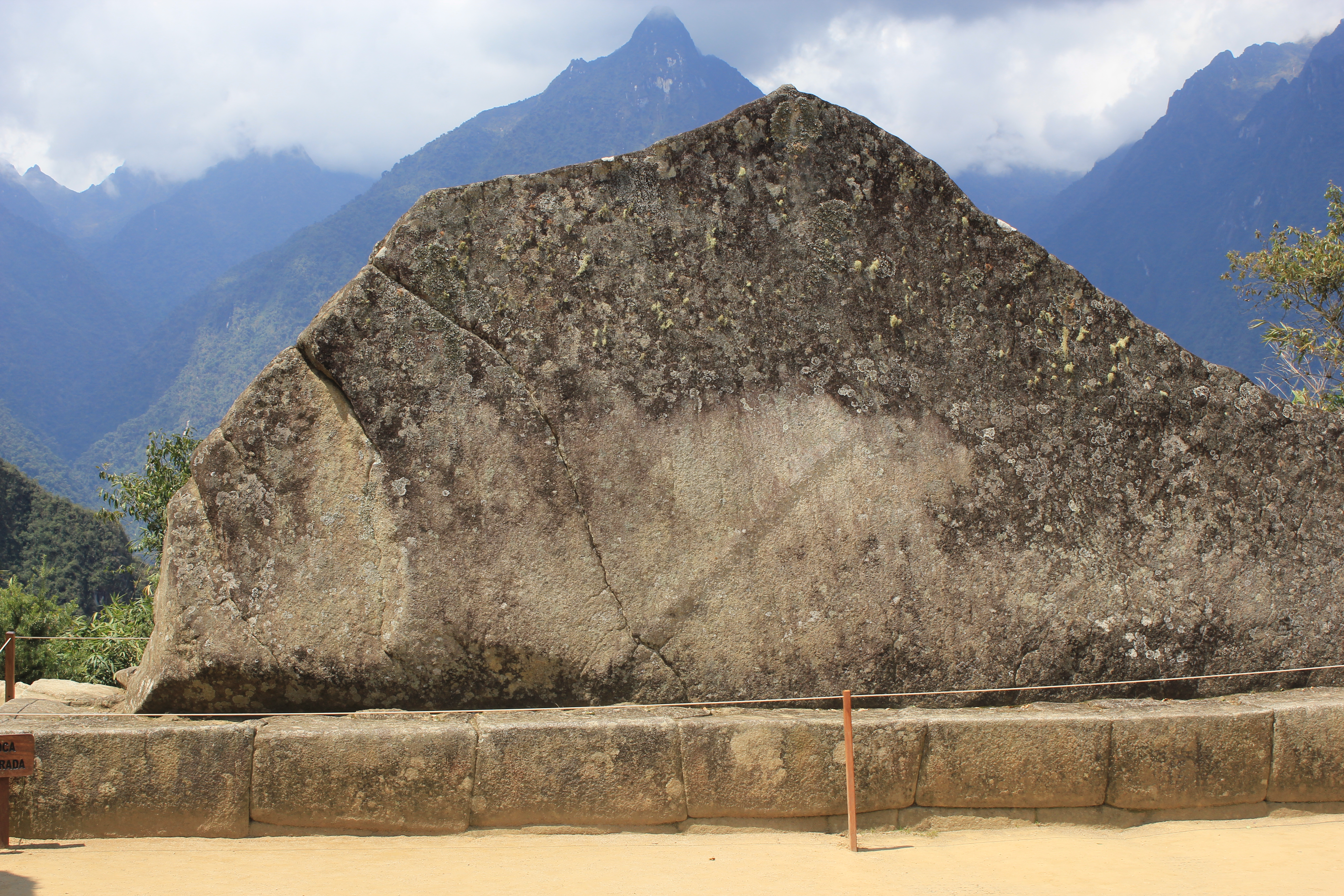
The Sacred Rock at Machu Picchu

In 1537, the Inca Emperor Manco Inca Yupanqui fought and won the Battle of Ollantaytambo against a Spanish army headed by Hernando Pizarro. Nevertheless, Manco soon withdrew from the Sacred Valley and the area came under the control of the Spanish colonists.

Oral histories in the Quechua language suggest that the ancient Inca married Pachamama (Mother Earth) and produced human offspring. The Incas are renowned for their precision in stone masonry. The architecture was a means of bringing order to untamed areas and the people of the Andes region. Machu Picchu, located in the Sacred Valley, is an example of the Incas adapting building strategies that acknowledge the topography of the area. While other Pre-Columbian cultures constructed man-made mountains, the Incas emphasized the natural forms of the topography around them. The Sacred Rock, located in the Sacred Valley, is an example of a stone that draws attention to the horizon of the mountain range.

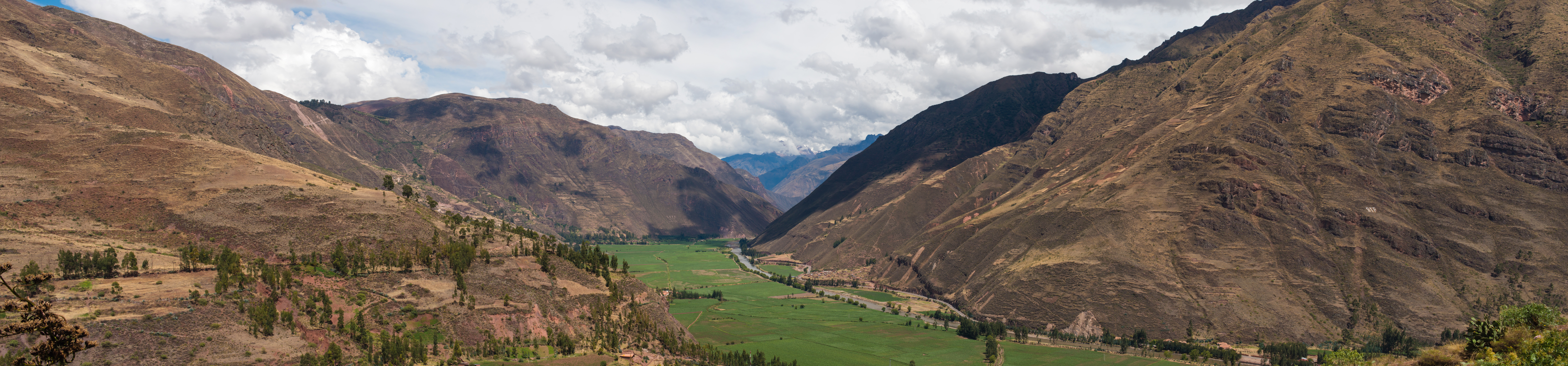
Panorama of the Sacred Valley of the Incas

== See also ==
- Huayna Picchu
- Machu Picchu
- Ollantaytambo
- Rumicolca
- Sallqaqucha Wallata Warak'ay
