= T'uqu T'uquyuq =

Archaeological site in Peru

- Machu Machuyuq
- Location: Peru
- Region: Cusco Region, Urubamba Province

Site notes
- Height: 3,150 metres (10,335 ft)

T'uqu T'uquyuq (Quechua t'uqu a niche, hole or gap in the wall, the reduplication indicates that there is a group or a complex of something, -yuq a suffix to indicate ownership, "the one with a complex of niches", also Toco Tocoyoc, Toqotoqoyoq, T'oqot'oqoyoq) or Machu Machuyuq (Quechua machu old, old person, also Machumachuyoc, Machumachuyoq) is an archaeological site with rock paintings in Peru. It is situated in the Cusco Region, Urubamba Province, Yucay District. The site lies at a height of about 3,150 metres (10,335 ft) on the slopes of the mountain Saywa (Sayhua).

At a distance of about 800 metres (2,625 ft) from T'uqu T'uquyuq there is another site with rock art named Ayawayq'u.
