= Capacsaya =

Mountain in Peru

- Location within Peru

Highest point
- Elevation: 5,044 m (16,549 ft)
- Coordinates: 13°11′20″S 72°06′43″W

Geography
- Location: Peru, Cusco Region
- Parent range: Andes, Urubamba

Capacsaya, Ccapacsaya (possibly from Quechua qhapaq mighty, saya slope, "mighty slope"), Media Luna or Huayurioc is a mountain in the Urubamba mountain range in the Andes of Peru, about 5,044 metres (16,549 ft) high. It is located in the Cusco Region, Calca Province, Lares District, and in the Urubamba Province, Urubamba District. Capacsaya lies northwest of Chicón and east of Pumahuanca, near Pumahuancajasa pass.
