= Yucay District =

Coordinates: 13.3217°S 72.0830°W

Yucay Yukay
- District
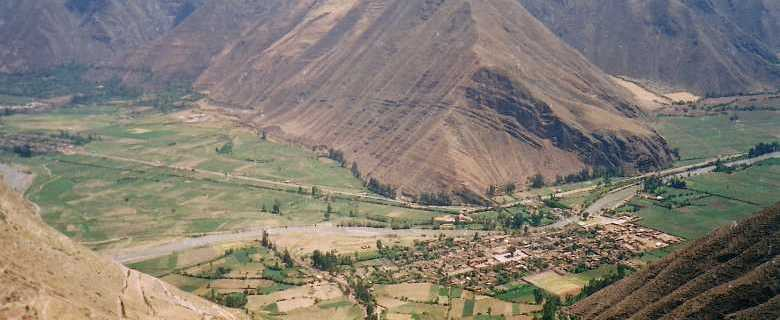
- Yukay (on the left) and Huallabamba (on the right)
- Interactive map of Yucay
- Country: Peru
- Region: Cusco
- Province: Urubamba
- Capital: Yucay

Government
  - Mayor: Juvenal Duran Espinoza

Area
  - Total: 70.57 km^{2} (27.25 sq mi)
- Elevation: 2,857 m (9,373 ft)

Population (2025)
  - Total: 3,365
  - Density: 47.68/km^{2} (123.5/sq mi)
- Time zone: UTC-5 (PET)
- UBIGEO: 081307

Yucay District is one of seven districts of the Urubamba province in Peru. The town of Yucay is the capital of the district.

== See also ==
- Ayawayq'u
- Ch'akiqucha
- T'uqu T'uquyuq
