= Khichuqaqa =

Archaeological site in Peru

- Location: Peru
- Region: Cusco Region, Urubamba Province

Site notes
- Height: 3,160 metres (10,367 ft)

Khichuqaqa (Quechua khichu a piece of a whole, fraction, qaqa rock, also spelled K'echuqaqa) is an archaeological site in Peru with rock paintings and tombs nearby. It is situated in the Cusco Region, Urubamba Province, Urubamba District. The site lies at a height of about 3,160 metres (10,367 ft) on the slope of the mountain Kapuliyuq (Quechua for "the one with the bitter-berry tree", Capulliyoq).
