= Urubamba District =

Coordinates: 13.3056°S 72.1179°W

Urubamba Urupampa
- District
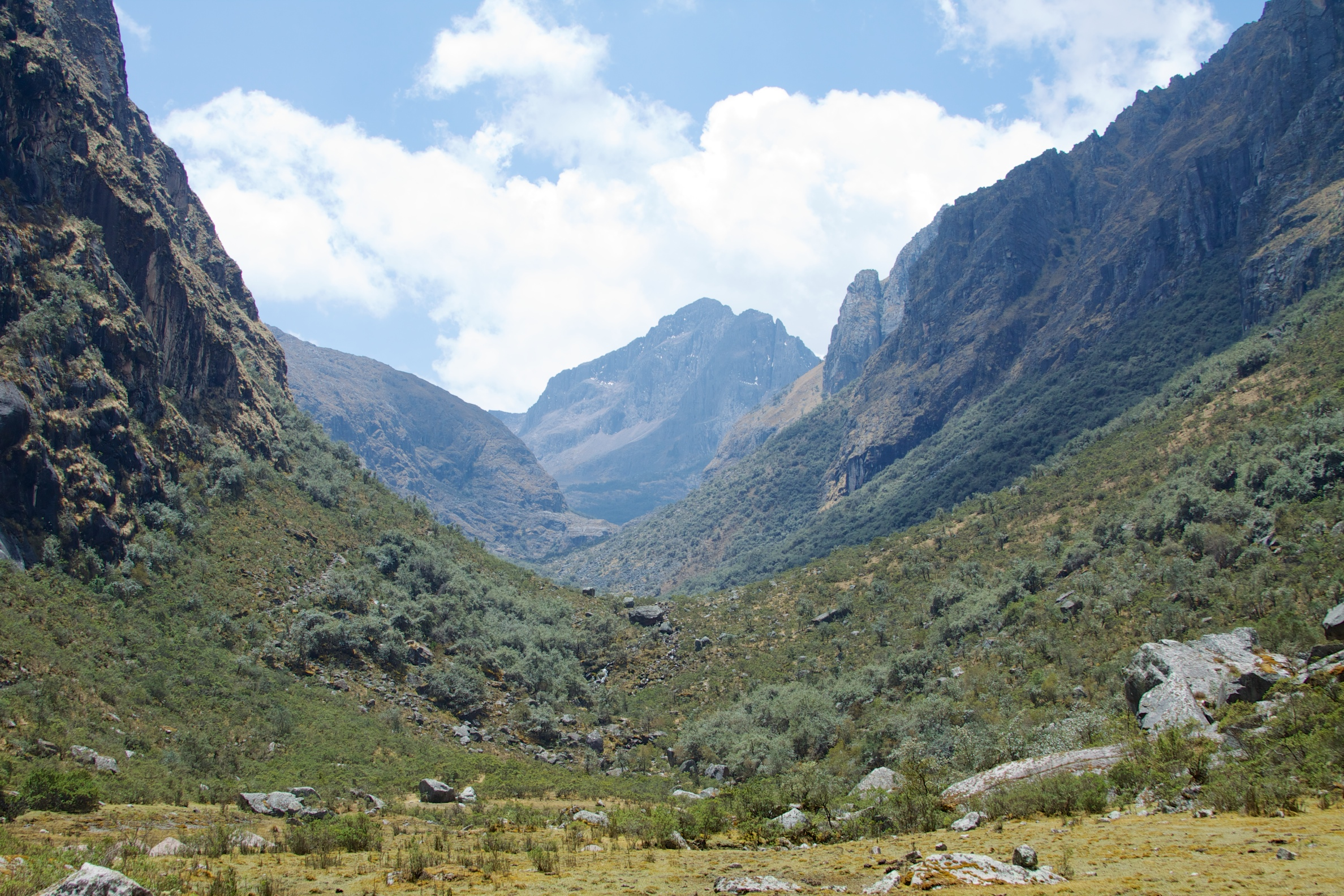
- Looking towards Pumawank'a Q'asa
- Interactive map of Urubamba; Urupampa
- Country: Peru
- Region: Cusco
- Province: Urubamba
- Capital: Urubamba

Government
  - Mayor: Luis Valcarcel Villegas

Area
  - Total: 128.28 km^{2} (49.53 sq mi)
- Elevation: 2,871 m (9,419 ft)

Population (2025)
  - Total: 24,213
  - Density: 188.75/km^{2} (488.86/sq mi)
- Time zone: UTC-5 (PET)
- UBIGEO: 081301

Urubamba District is one of seven districts of the Urubamba province in Peru.

== Geography ==
The Urupampa mountain range traverses the district. One of highest peaks of the district is Ch'iqun at 5,530 m (18,143 ft). Other mountains are listed below:

- Aqu Q'asa
- Puka Q'asa
- Pumawank'a
- Qhapaq Saya
- Sut'uq
- Taruka Kancha
- T'uruhana
- Uman Urqu

== Climate ==
Climate data for Urubamba, elevation 2,850 m (9,350 ft), (1991–2020)
Month	Jan	Feb	Mar	Apr	May	Jun	Jul	Aug	Sep	Oct	Nov	Dec	Year
Mean daily maximum °C (°F)	22.2 (72.0)	22.0 (71.6)	22.3 (72.1)	23.0 (73.4)	23.4 (74.1)	22.8 (73.0)	22.4 (72.3)	23.2 (73.8)	23.6 (74.5)	23.6 (74.5)	23.8 (74.8)	22.7 (72.9)	22.9 (73.3)
Mean daily minimum °C (°F)	9.5 (49.1)	9.6 (49.3)	9.2 (48.6)	7.7 (45.9)	5.0 (41.0)	3.1 (37.6)	2.1 (35.8)	3.6 (38.5)	6.0 (42.8)	8.1 (46.6)	8.9 (48.0)	9.3 (48.7)	6.8 (44.3)
Average precipitation mm (inches)	105.4 (4.15)	101.3 (3.99)	72.0 (2.83)	22.5 (0.89)	4.1 (0.16)	5.4 (0.21)	5.4 (0.21)	6.7 (0.26)	7.8 (0.31)	38.1 (1.50)	56.4 (2.22)	92.6 (3.65)	517.7 (20.38)
Source: National Meteorology and Hydrology Service of Peru

== See also ==
- Khichuqaqa
