= Lamay District =

Coordinates: 13.3641°S 71.9200°W

Lamay
- District
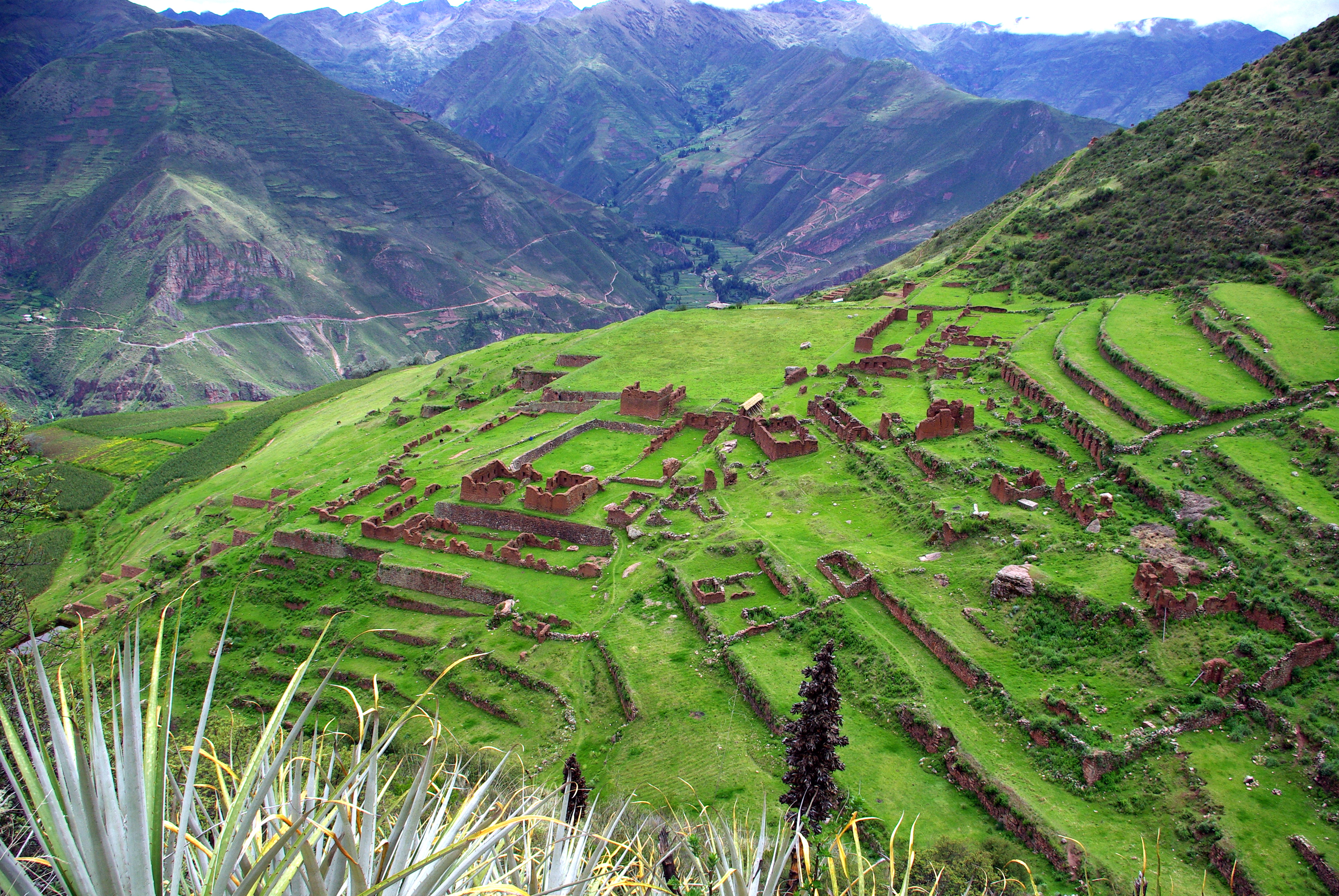
- The Willkapampa valley of the Lamay District as seen from the archaeological site of Huch'uy Qusqu
- Interactive map of Lamay
- Country: Peru
- Region: Cusco
- Province: Calca
- Founded: January 3, 1952
- Capital: Lamay

Government
  - Mayor: Guido Alvarez Chavez

Area
  - Total: 94.22 km^{2} (36.38 sq mi)
- Elevation: 2,941 m (9,649 ft)

Population (2005 census)
  - Total: 5,633
  - Density: 59.79/km^{2} (154.8/sq mi)
- Time zone: UTC-5 (PET)
- UBIGEO: 080403

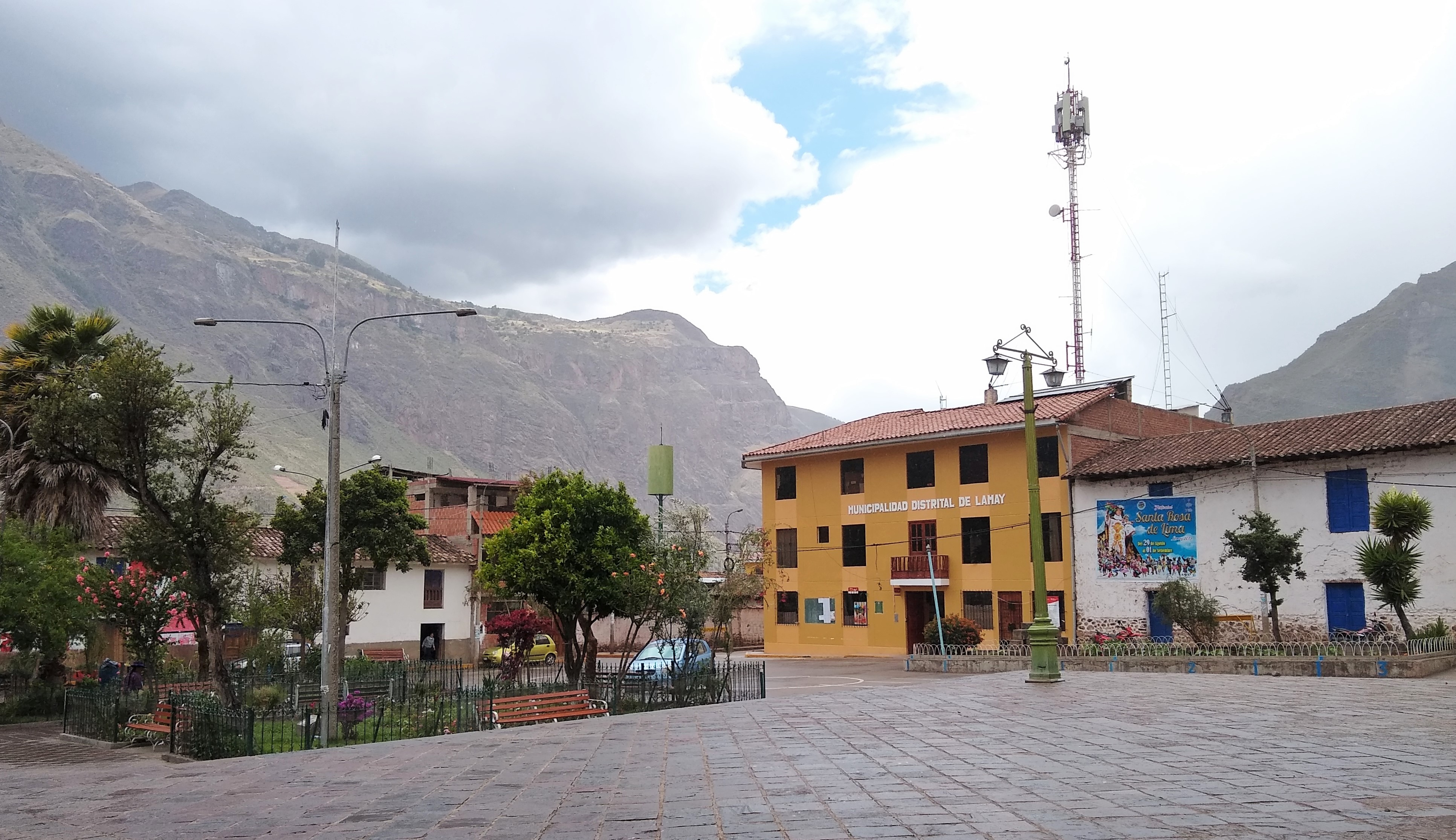
Town square in Lamay Peru

Lamay District is one of eight districts of the province Calca in Peru.

== Geography ==
Some of the highest mountains of the district are listed below:

- Ch'aki Pukyu
- Hatun Parqu
- Hatun Suyu Q'asa
- Misti Urqu
- Pantilla Qullqa
- Paqu Q'asa
- Pintas Wayq'u
- Phalchayuq
- Quri Mit'ay
- Q'umir
- Silla Q'asa
- Suntur
- Suraqucha
- Wiraqucha Q'asa

== Ethnic groups ==
The people in the district are mainly indigenous citizens of Quechua descent. Quechua is the language which the majority of the population (81.43%) learnt to speak in childhood, 18.05% of the residents started speaking using the Spanish language (2007 Peru Census).

== See also ==
- Kimsaqucha
