= Pucajasa (Urubamba) =

Mountain in Peru

- Location within Peru

Highest point
- Elevation: 4,800 m (15,700 ft)
- Coordinates: 13°12′29″S 72°05′01″W

Naming
- Language of name: Quechua

Geography
- Location: Peru, Cusco Region
- Parent range: Andes, Urubamba

Pucajasa (possibly from Quechua puka red, q'asa mountain pass, "red mountain pass") is a mountain in the Urubamba mountain range in the Andes of Peru, about 4,800 m (15,700 ft) high. It is located in the Cusco Region, Urubamba Province, Urubamba District. It lies at the pass named Pumahuancajasa (possibly from Quechua for "Pumahuanca pass").

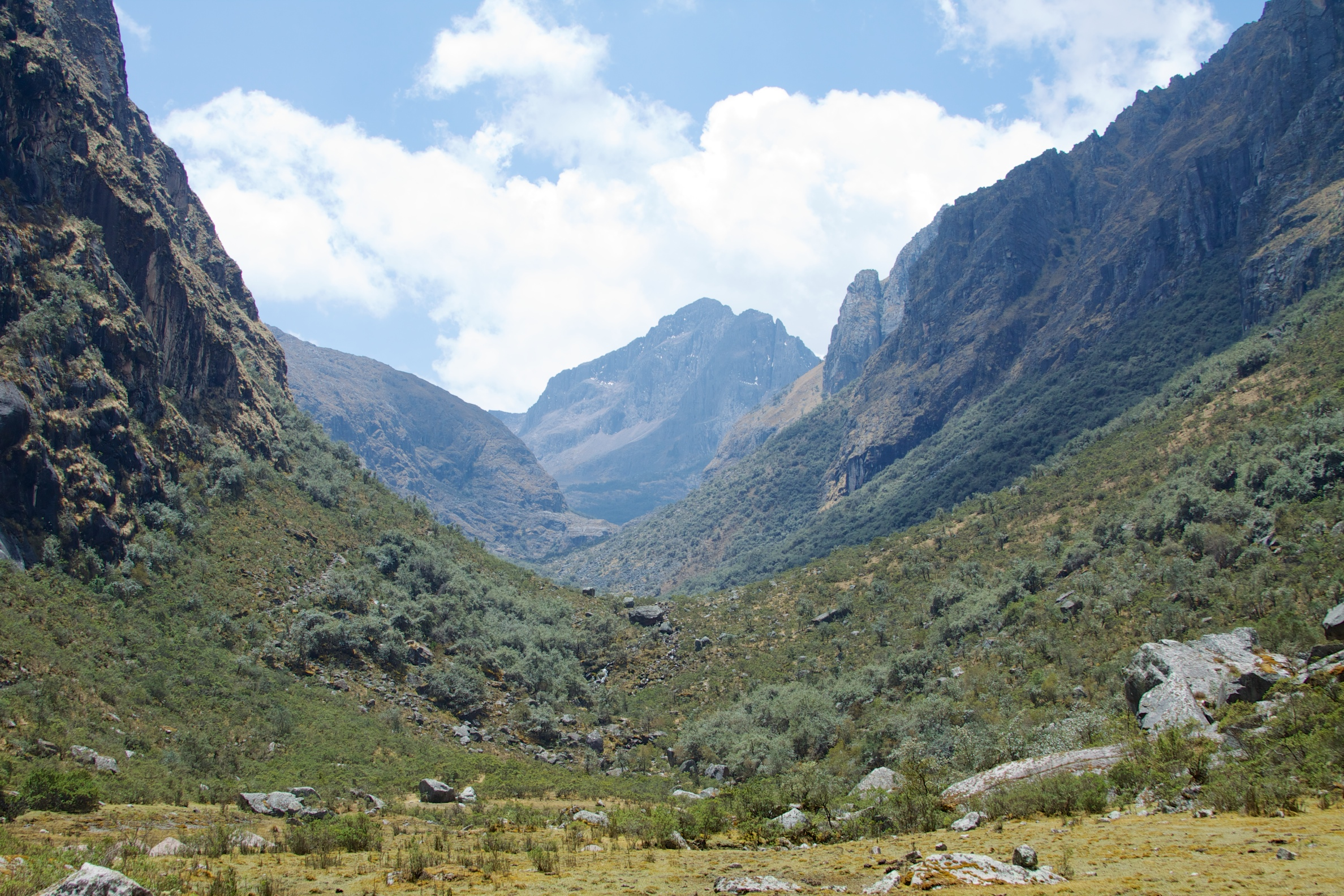
Looking towards Pumahuancajasa from southeast of Pucajasa
