= Pumahuanca =

Mountain in Peru

- Pumahuanja, Yucay
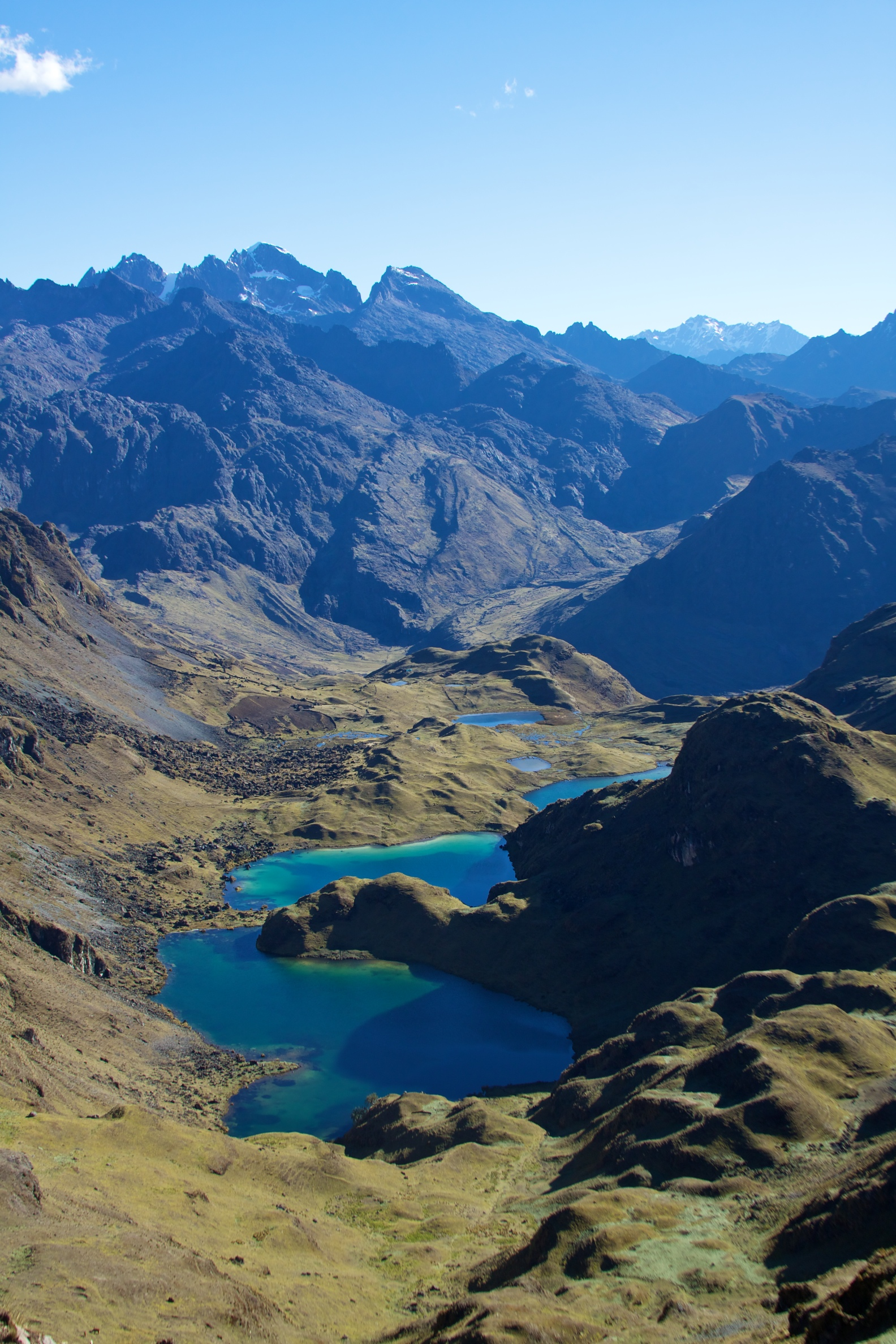
- Pumahuanca as seen from Killaqucha northeast of it

Highest point
- Elevation: 5,318 m (17,448 ft)
- Coordinates: 13°11′17″S 72°08′16″W

Geography
- Location within Peru
- Location: Peru
- Parent range: Andes, Urubamba

Climbing
- First ascent: 1-1958 from west

Pumahuanca, Pumahuanja (possibly from Quechua puma cougar, puma, wank'a rock, "puma rock") or Yucay is a 5,318-metre-high (17,448 ft) mountain in the Urubamba mountain range in the Andes of Peru. It is located in the Cusco Region, on the boundary between Calca and Urubamba provinces, northwest of the town of Urubamba. It lies northwest of Chicón and west of Capacsaya.

== See also ==
- Lares trek
