= Yucay =

Yucay Yukay
- Village
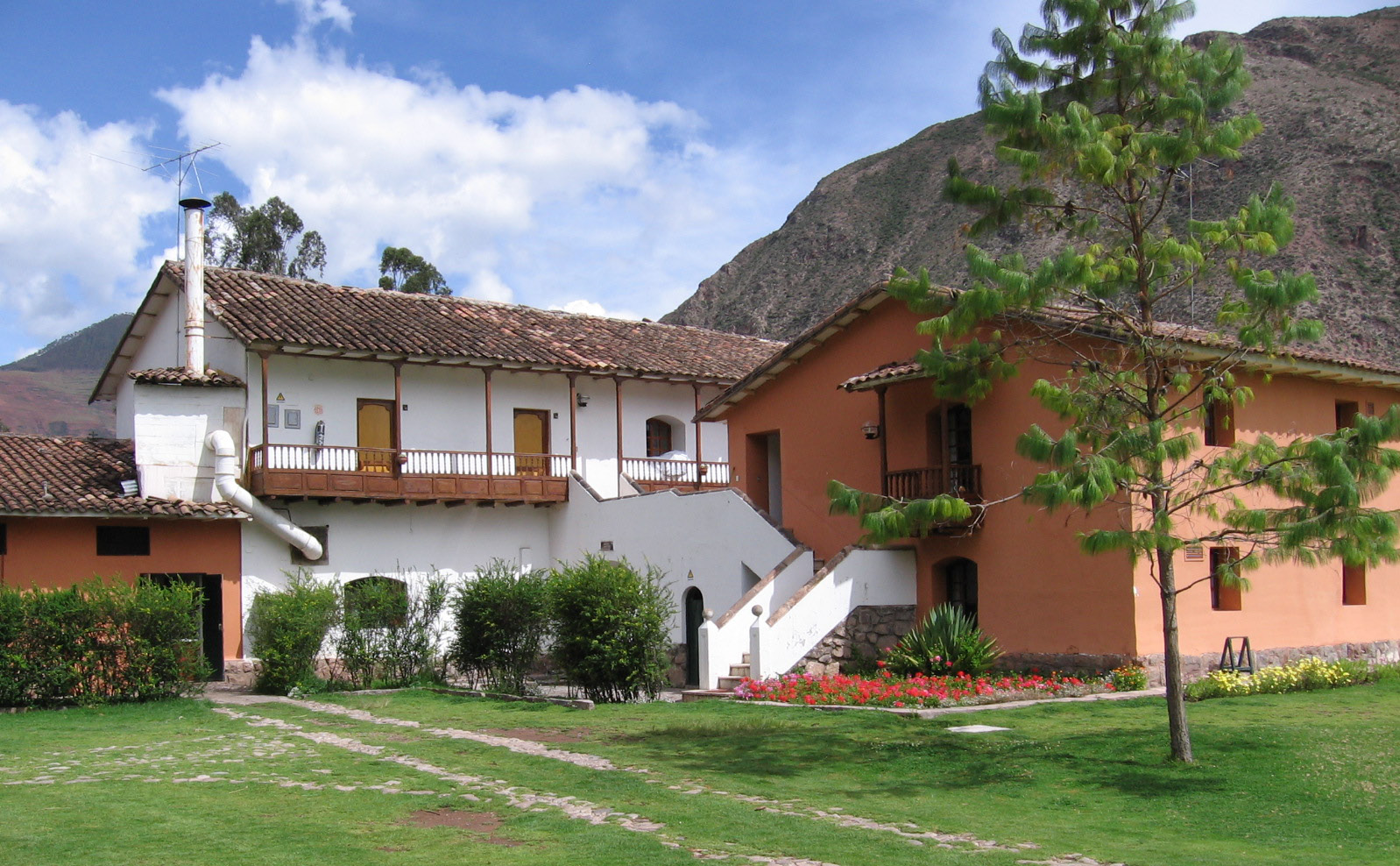
- Yucay, Peru (March 2006)

- Location within Peru
- Coordinates: 13°19′00″S 72°05′21″W
- Country: Peru
- Region: Cusco
- Province: Urubamba
- District: Yucay

Government
  - Mayor: Leocadio Madera
- Elevation: 2,857 m (9,373 ft)
- Time zone: UTC-5 (PET)

Yucay (Quechua: Yukay) is a town in southern Peru. It is the capital of the Yucay District, which is near the center of Urubamba Province in the Cusco Region of southern Peru.

The area where Yucay is located is commonly called the Sacred Valley of the Incas. Many Inca ruins are in the Sacred Valley near the Urubamba River and extending up the nearby hillsides in agricultural terraces called andenes. The town is located at an elevation of 2,860 metres (9,380 ft).
