= Urubamba, Peru =

Urubamba Urupampa
- Town
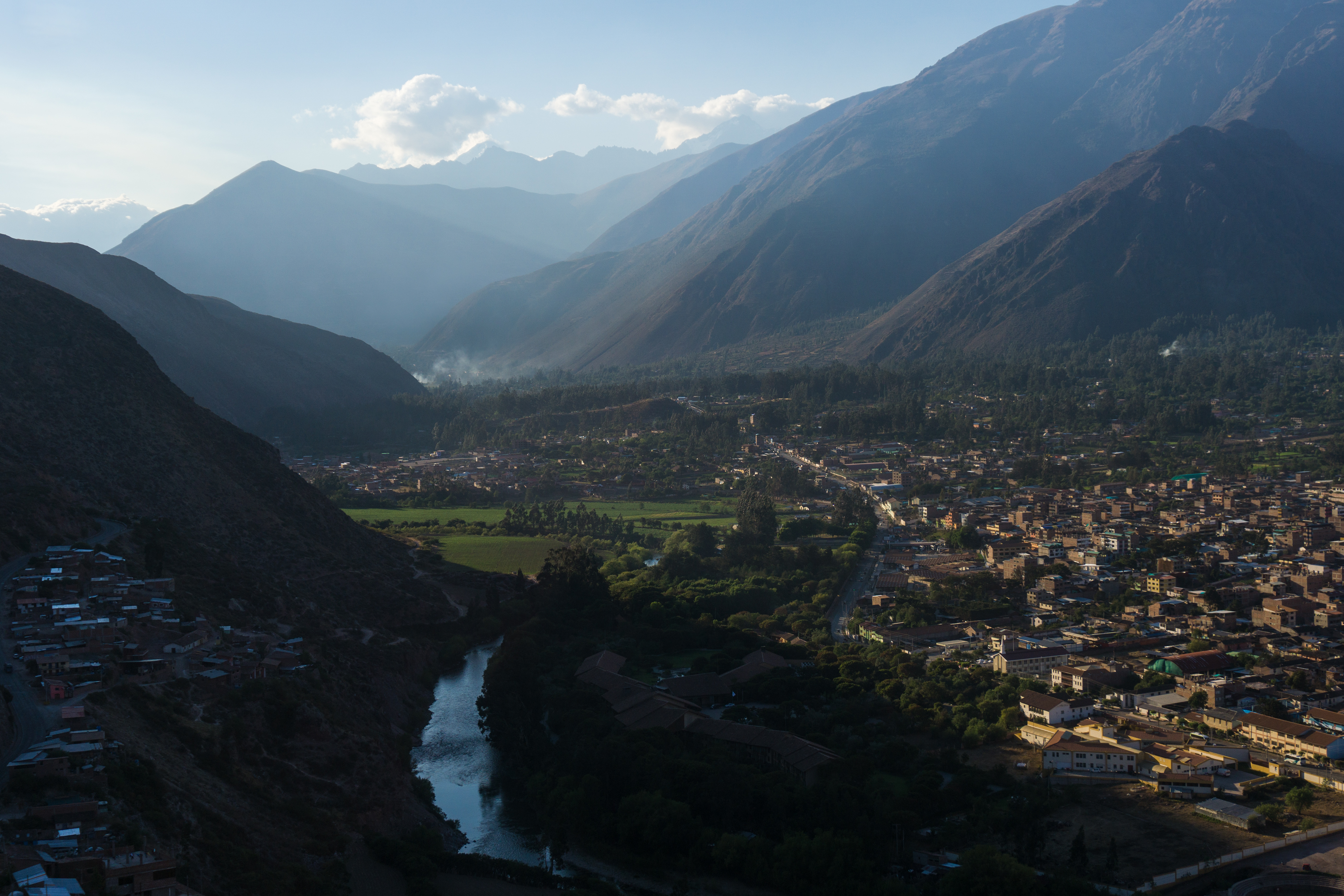
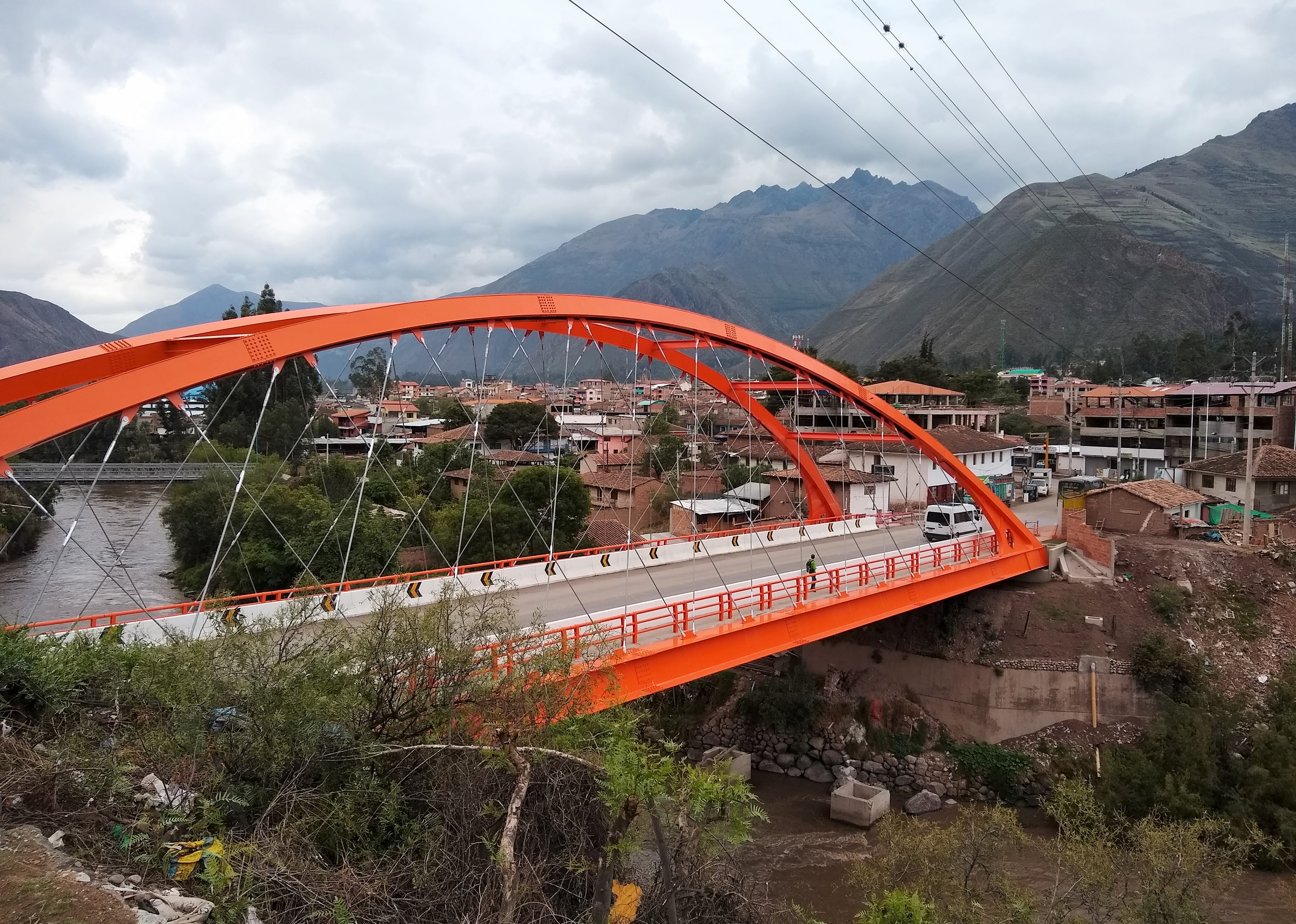
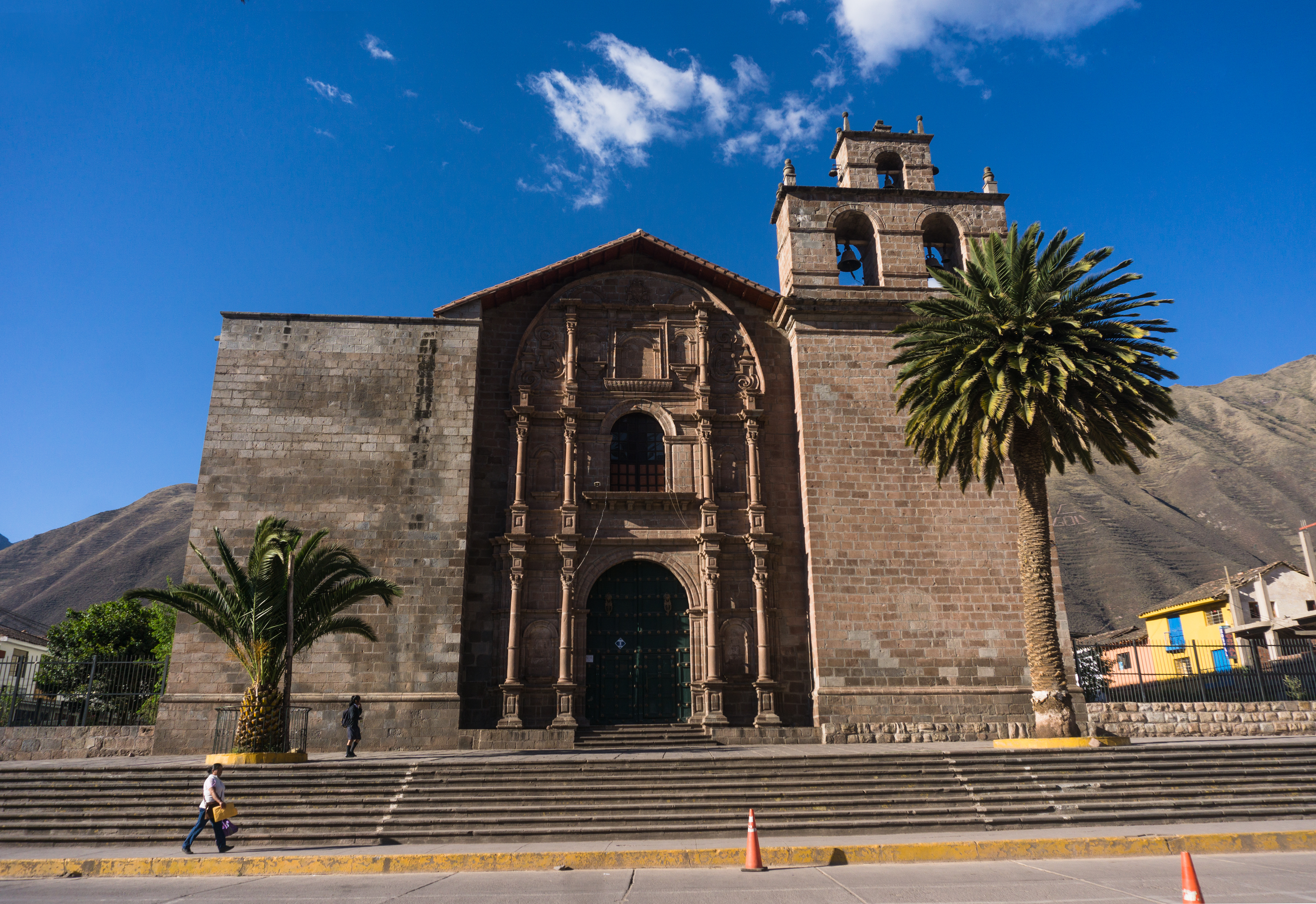
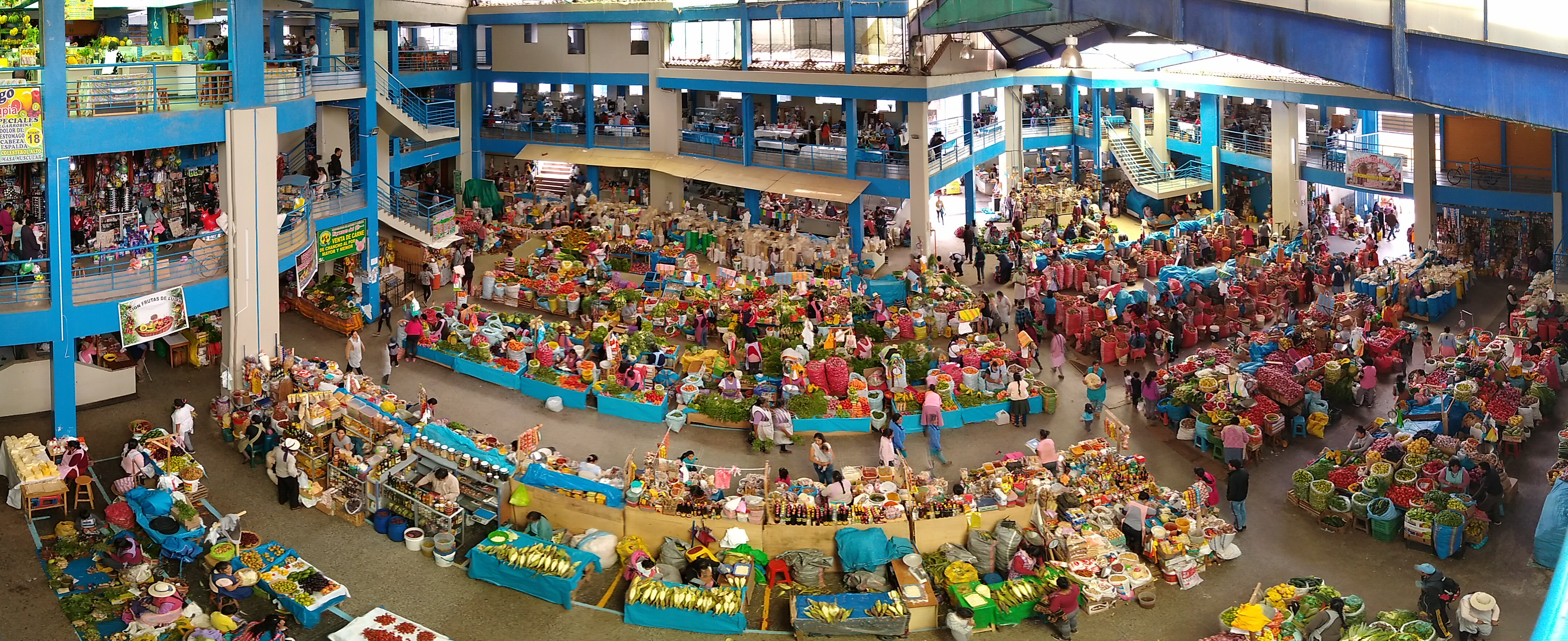
- The City with the Urubamba River Urubamba Bridge San Pedro Church Urubamba Market

- Location within Peru
- Coordinates: 13°18′15″S 72°07′00″W
- Country: Peru
- Region: Cusco Region

Government
  - Mayor: Luis Alberto Valcárcel
- Elevation: 2,870 m (9,420 ft)

Population (2011)
  - Total: 2,700
- Time zone: UTC-05:00 (America/Lima)

Urubamba (possibly from in the Quechua spelling Urupampa, flat land of spiders) is a small town in Peru, located near the Urubamba River under the snow-capped mountain Chicón. It is the capital of the district of the same name. Located one hour from Cusco, Urubamba is the largest town in the Sacred Valley of the Incas. It is also located near a number of significant ruins of the Inca Empire, including Machu Picchu. The sparse remains of the Inca palace, Quispiguanca, are within the town. Tourists often come through the town on their way to visit these sites.

== Geography ==
Urubamba is located in the Highlands of Peru. It is regarded as a good location to go to acclimatise to the elevation to prevent altitude sickness prior to going more popular tourist destinations like Cusco.

== Climate ==
Climate data for Urubamba, elevation 2,850 m (9,350 ft), (1991–2020)
Month	Jan	Feb	Mar	Apr	May	Jun	Jul	Aug	Sep	Oct	Nov	Dec	Year
Mean daily maximum °C (°F)	22.2 (72.0)	22.0 (71.6)	22.3 (72.1)	23.0 (73.4)	23.4 (74.1)	22.8 (73.0)	22.4 (72.3)	23.2 (73.8)	23.6 (74.5)	23.6 (74.5)	23.8 (74.8)	22.7 (72.9)	22.9 (73.3)
Mean daily minimum °C (°F)	9.5 (49.1)	9.6 (49.3)	9.2 (48.6)	7.7 (45.9)	5.0 (41.0)	3.1 (37.6)	2.1 (35.8)	3.6 (38.5)	6.0 (42.8)	8.1 (46.6)	8.9 (48.0)	9.3 (48.7)	6.8 (44.3)
Average precipitation mm (inches)	105.4 (4.15)	101.3 (3.99)	72.0 (2.83)	22.5 (0.89)	4.1 (0.16)	5.4 (0.21)	5.4 (0.21)	6.7 (0.26)	7.8 (0.31)	38.1 (1.50)	56.4 (2.22)	92.6 (3.65)	517.7 (20.38)
Source: National Meteorology and Hydrology Service of Peru

== Economy ==
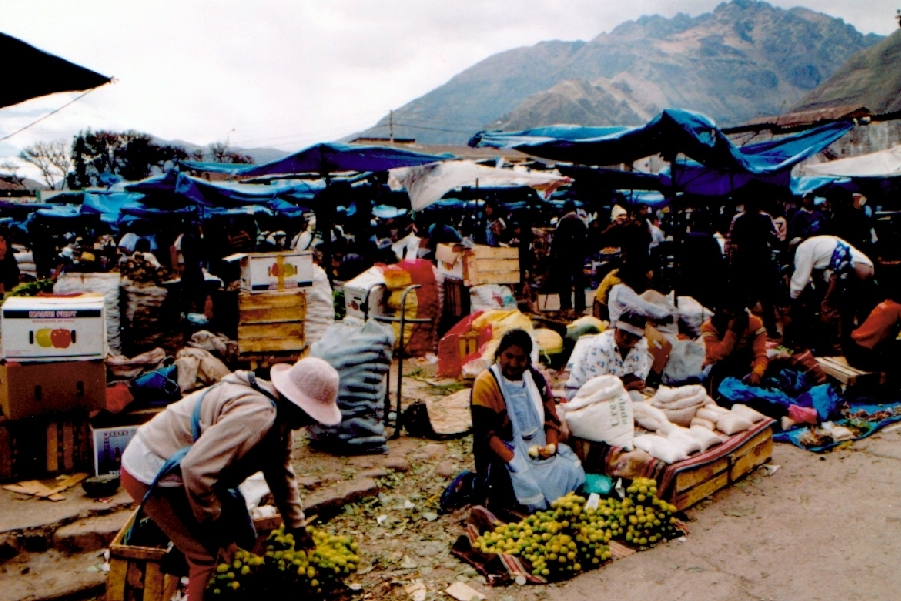
Market in Urubamba

There is a popular market selling fresh fruit and vegetables and also pots, pans, and other essential items. As social workers/volunteers visit the city often, the main market does cater to tourists, although locally produced alpaca garments or ornaments are usually for sale in small stores within the town. There is also a small market selling only fresh produce that is open on select days during the week, and can sometimes be found selling items that are normally not sold in the main market.

== Arts and culture ==
Dancers at the festival of El Senor de Turichayuq

There is a large sporting field used for local football matches and also for festivals, including the festival of El Señor de Torrechayoc. (Note: There is a church dedicated to El Señor de Torrechayoc within the town.) During the first week of June the town swells with dancers and visitors from local towns who perform in the streets. The festivities continue the celebration well into the early hours. The dancing culminates with group performances on the local football pitch.

== Transportation ==
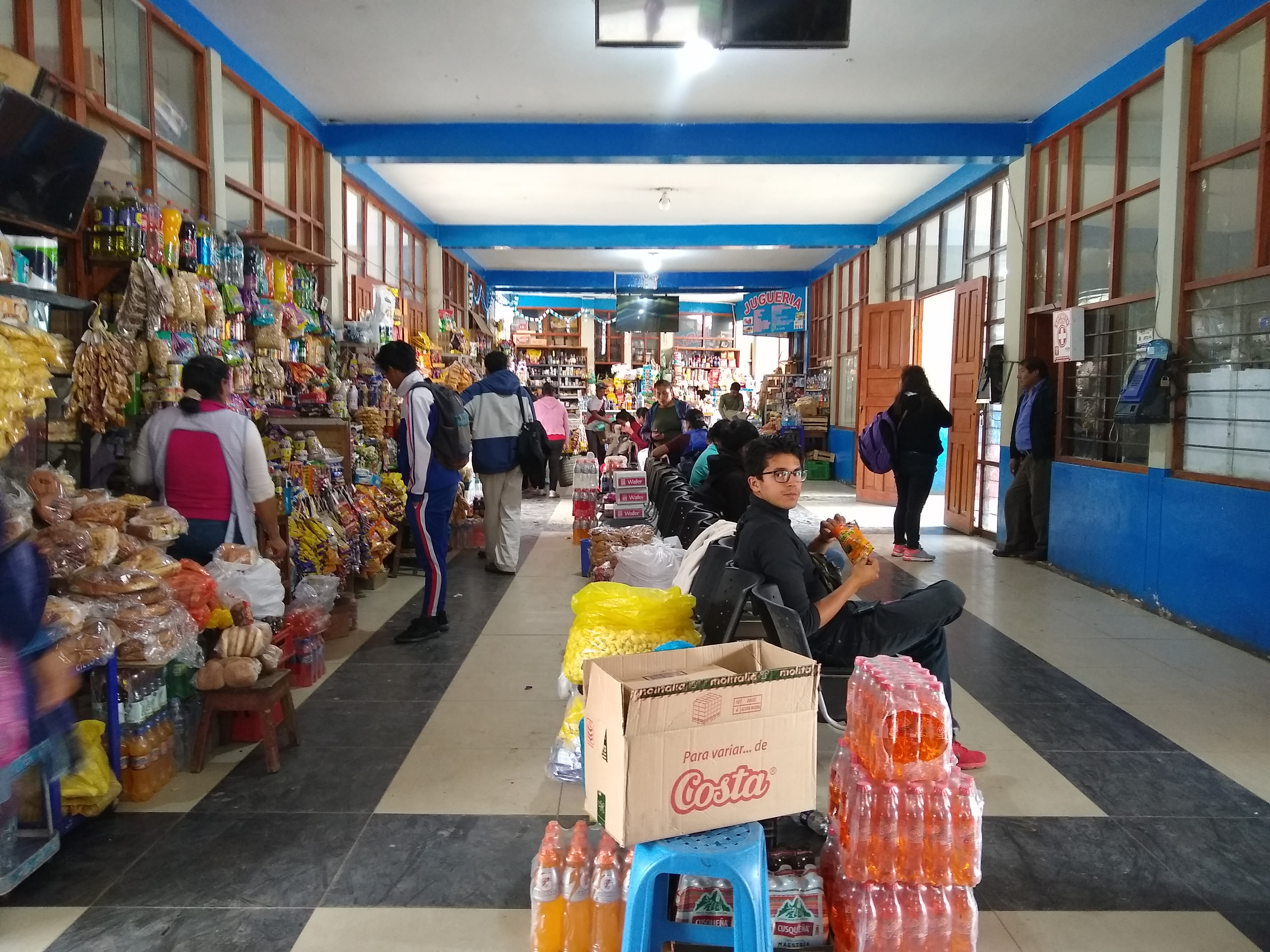
Urubamba bus station

Due to the town's proximity to a number of Inca ruins it is a transportation hub with a bus depot and easy access to cabs.

== See also ==
- PeruRail
- Quispiguanca, an Inca ruin within the city limits of Urubamba.
