= Huchuy Qosqo =

Archaeological site in Peru

- Qaqyaqawana; Caquia Xaquixaguana
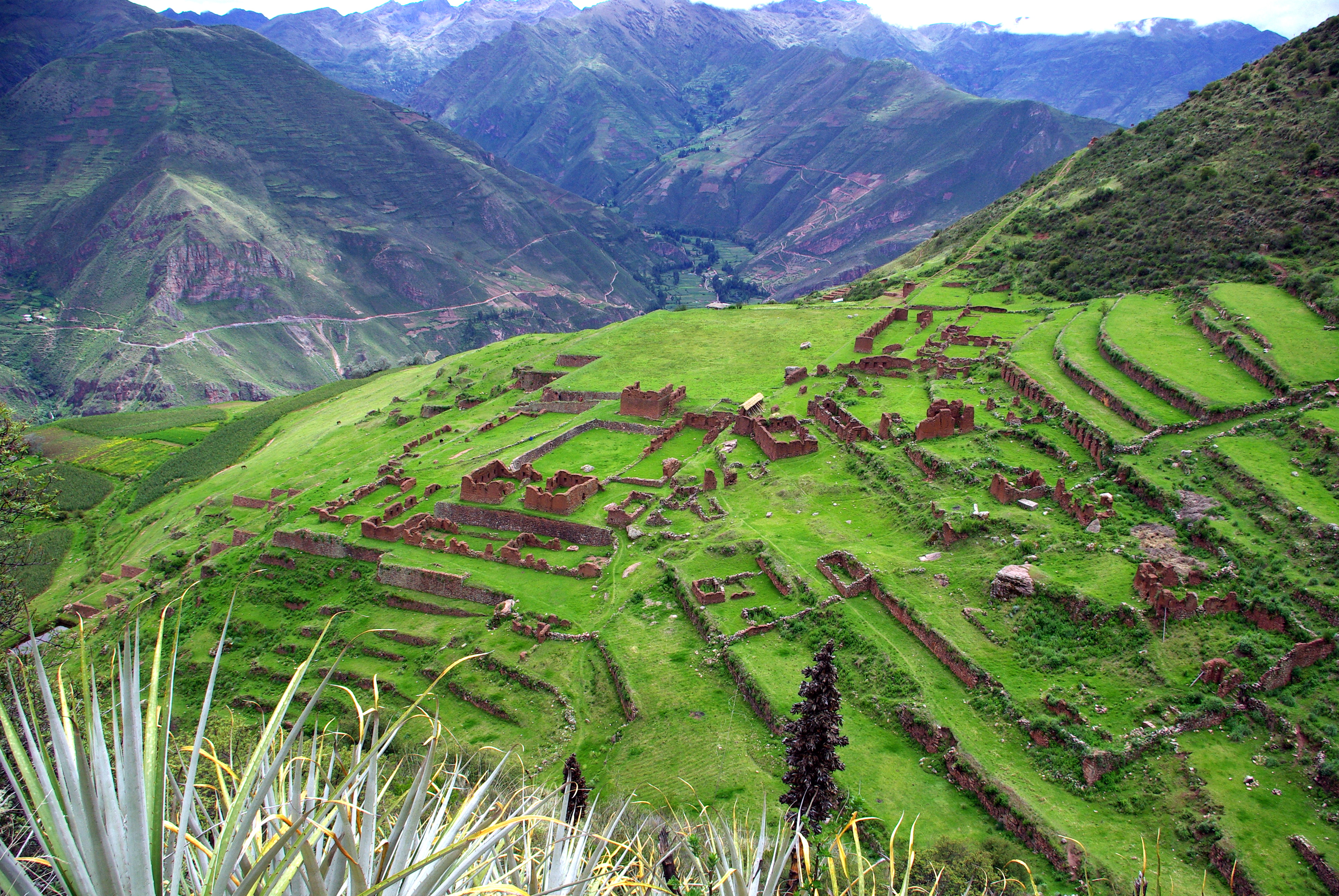
- Huchuy Qosqo overlooking the Sacred Valley.

- Location within Peru
- Interactive map of Huchuy Qosqo
- 13.3663°S 71.9451°W
- Type: Settlement
- Cultures: Inca Empire
- Location: Lamay District. Calca Province, Cusco Region, Peru

History
- Built: 1420 CE

Huchuy Qosqo, (also spelled Yuchuy Cuzco), is an Incan archaeological site north of Cuzco, Peru. Its name is Quechua for "Little Cuzco". It lies at an elevation of 3,650 meters (11,980 feet), overlooking the Sacred Valley and 3 kilometres (1.9 mi) west and above the town of Lamay at an elevation of 2,920 metres (9,580 ft). The site received its name in the 20th century; previously it had been known as Caquia Xaquixaguana (alternative spelling Kakya Shakishawana), or Kakya Qawani.

Huchuy Qosqo or Kakya Qawani, as it was known by the Incas, was probably established as a royal estate by the Inca Emperor Viracocha about 1420 CE.

== Royal estate ==
The settlement at the archaeological ruin at Huchuy Qusqo dates back to between 1000 and 1400 CE. In the early 1400s, according to the Spanish chronicler Pedro de Cieza de León, it became a royal estate of the semi-mythical Viracocha, (c. 1410-1438), the eighth Inca ruler. The Inca Empire did not as a common practice tax the income or production of its citizens, but rather controlled land and labor. Thus, Inca leaders acquired large royal estates to increase their power and wealth and that of their descendants who inherited the estates. Royal estates served also as elegant country palaces and, at times, fortresses to fend off rivals for power. Thus, the name Huchuy Qosqo, "Little Cusco", for a royal estate or government center modeled on the Inca capital.

To build, operate, and maintain his estate, Viracocha and his descendants required large numbers of workers. Citizens of the Inca empire were obligated, under the mit'a system, to contribute labor to the Empire, rather than being taxed on their wealth or production. The impressed mit'a labor was most probably found among nearby ethnic groups, although specialists and craftsmen might be imported.

Another Inca policy, that of mitma, was probably used to collect labor for the royal estate. Mitmaqkuna were families or whole ethnic groups who were relocated to new lands in the empire or settled in enclaves among the earlier inhabitants of an area. The purpose was to distribute different ethnic groups widely, thus separating potential troublemakers and reducing the possibility of organized resistance to the Incas. The mitmaqkuna were discouraged from mixing with local ethnic groups. A third source of labor for the estate was the yanakunas, the permanent servants of the Incas. The Yanakuna's often rose to high positions in the Empire, and like the mitma were governed directly by the Incas. Still a fourth source of labor for the royal estates was the aqllakuna, sequestered women who lived together and produced textiles, a major source of Inca wealth, and chicha, the fermented drink consumed at feasts. The allakuna were often married to men honored for their service to the Empire.

These four sources provided the labor and expertise for the management of a royal estate which might control thousands of acres of agricultural and grazing land, mines, textile factories, and other resources and employ thousands of people. Sixteenth century Spanish sources identify more than 40 ethnic groups found in one area of the Sacred Valley, an indication of the degree of resettlement and population disruption undertaken by the Incas during their reign.

The Emperor Viracocha faced a revolt late in his reign by the Chancha people. Viracocha took refuge in Huchuy Qosqo, leaving the defense of Cuzco to his son Pachacuti. who put down the revolt, deposed his father, and became the Emperor, or Sapa Inca (1438–1471).

Huchuy Qosqo was expanded after Viracocha was deposed. Radiocarbon dating indicates construction on the site took place between 1420 CE and 1530 CE. The Spanish conquistador Gonzalo Pizarro looted Huchuy Qosqo and burned the mummy of Viracocha about 1534.

== The archaeological site ==
Amongst a large number of buildings, some stone, some adobe, is a kallanka (great hall), 40 m (130 ft) long. Providing water to the site is an Inca built irrigation channel, lined with stones for about 800 m (2,600 ft).

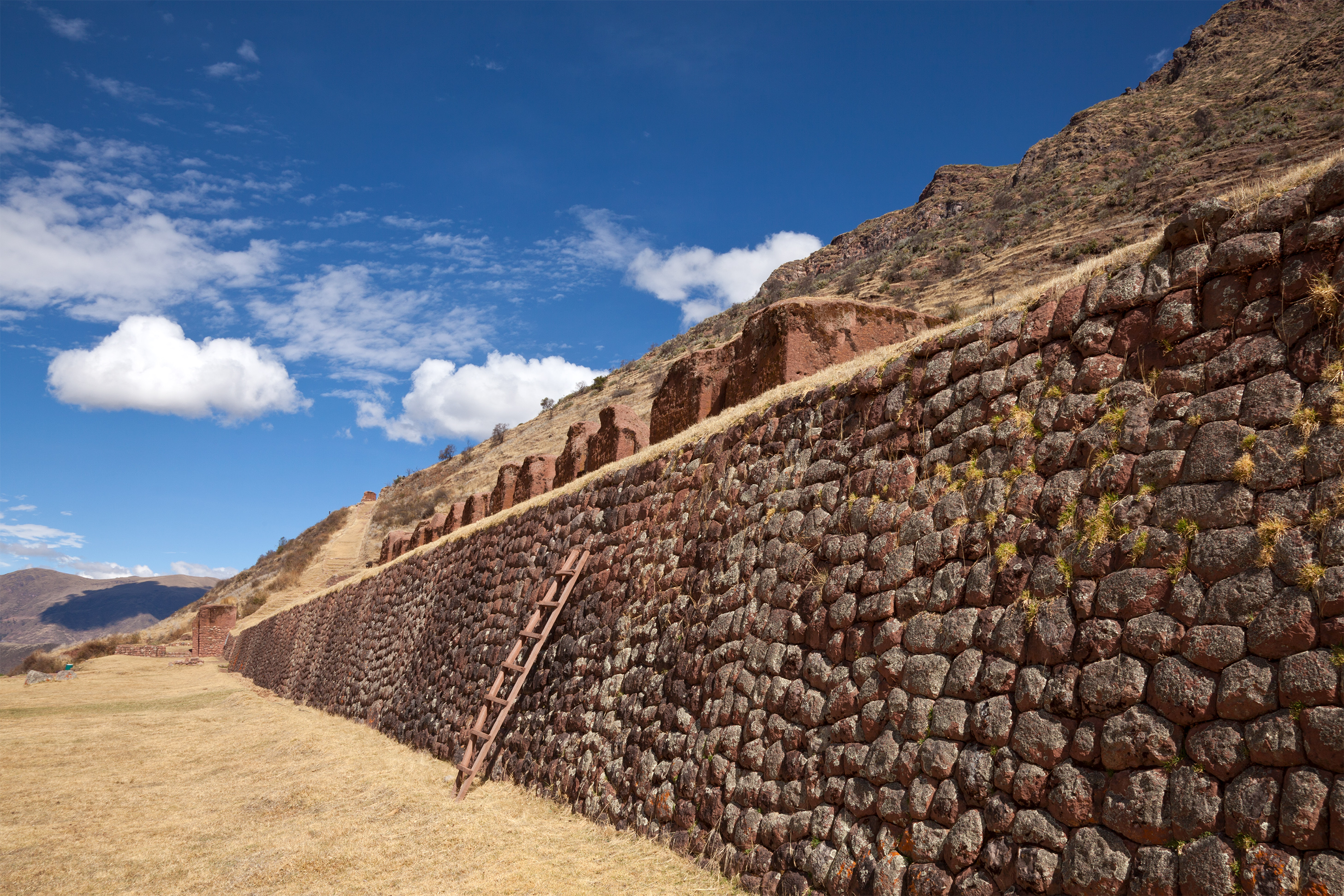
Inca wall and agricultural terrace (anden)

The Spanish took control of Huchuy Qosqo in the 1500s, after the Manco Inca Revolution (approx. 1540) and used the site as a farm. The Incas had constructed several small reservoirs for irrigation. During their time at Huchuy Qosqo the Spanish demolished some other Inca structures to build the larger reservoir you see today.

Below the main Huchuy Qosqo site is the recently restored store houses qolqas for dried meat and crops such as corn, potatoes, quinoa, and beans. In this two-story structure, you can see the historic cooling storage system known as ´conjeras.´

This site is inaccessible by public road and only reached by a physically strenuous hike or on horseback. The two main access points by foot are from Lamay — 3 hours up a steep set of switchbacks — or from Tauca, Peru — about 4 – 6 hours on foot, the first third of the hike steadily increasing to a pass at 4,400 m (14,400 ft), then mostly downhill, and visiting some other ruins. The 2-day route from Tauca to Lamay is described in Peter Frost's "Exploring Cusco". A number of tour groups also lead two-day hikes or horseback trips to Huchuy Qosqo.

== See also ==
- List of archaeological sites in Peru

== Sources ==
- Exploring Cusco, Peter Frost, 5th Edition (1999), Nuevas Imágenes.

Although not directly accessible by road, a dirt road leaving Lamay runs a long set of switch backs and arrives at a viewpoint of the ruins. The walk from this viewpoint to the north entrance of the ruins is about 150 m (490 ft), and runs past a few houses inhabited by local farmers. The entrance fee for this national park is 22 Peruvian soles for adults, 10 for students, and free for Peruvian citizens with official vertification(DNI), which will be collected by the two groundskeepers who permanently reside near the ruin entrance.
