= List of protected areas of Peru =

Protected areas of Peru: National parks; National reserves; National sanctuaries; Historic sanctuaries; Landscape reserves; Wildlife refuges; Communal reserves; Protected forests; Game reserves; Reserved zones

Peru is recognized as one of the world's 17 megadiverse countries, due to its high concentration of species and diverse ecosystems. Peru's protected areas are continental and marine regions formally designated by the State to conserve the country's biological diversity and associated cultural, scenic and scientific values, while contributing to sustainable development. These areas are administered at three levels: by the National System of State‑Protected Natural Areas (Spanish: Sistema Nacional de Áreas Naturales Protegidas por el Estado, SINANPE) under the National Service of Natural Protected Areas (SERNANP); by regional governments as regional conservation areas (Áreas de Conservación Regional, ACR); and by private individuals or communities as private conservation areas (Áreas de Conservación Privada, ACP).

As of 2026, Peru has 265 protected natural areas covering terrestrial and marine environments: 77 managed nationally by SERNANP, 39 by regional governments, and 149 under private administration. These areas cover 22.15% of the country's terrestrial territory and 7.9% of its marine territory. The system includes 15 national parks, 18 national reserves, 9 national sanctuaries, 4 historic sanctuaries, 2 landscape reserves, 3 wildlife refuges, 11 communal reserves, 7 protected forests, 2 game reserves, and 6 reserved zones, representing the country's altitudinal gradients from the Amazon lowlands through Andean highlands to Pacific coastal deserts. Protected Natural Areas Day (Día de las Áreas Naturales Protegidas del Perú) is celebrated annually on 17 October, recognizing their critical role in biodiversity conservation, ecosystem services, and sustainable development for present and future generations. This list includes all terrestrial and marine areas formally designated as protected under Peruvian law—at the national, regional, or private level—as of 9 September 2026.

== National System of State‑Protected Natural Areas ==
The National System of State-Protected Natural Areas is the only network of nationally administered protected areas, managed by the National Service of Natural Protected Areas, which is under the Ministry of the Environment. The system's objective is to support sustainable development by conserving representative samples of Peru's biodiversity. SINANPE sites, established with definitive status or with provisional status pending further study as reserved zones, are classified into ten legal categories, including national parks, reserves and sanctuaries.

=== National parks ===
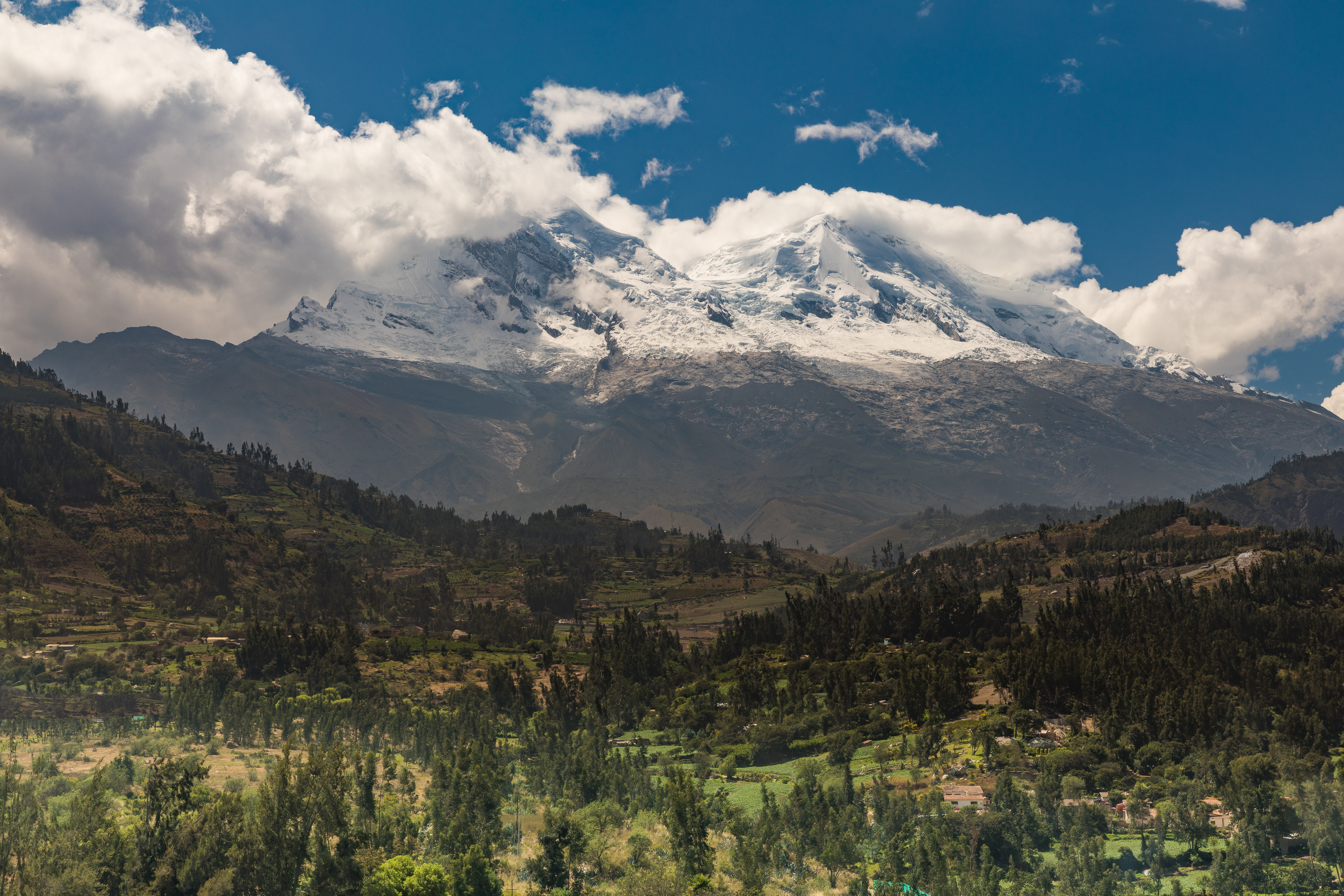
Mount Huascarán, Peru's highest peak, located within Huascarán National Park.

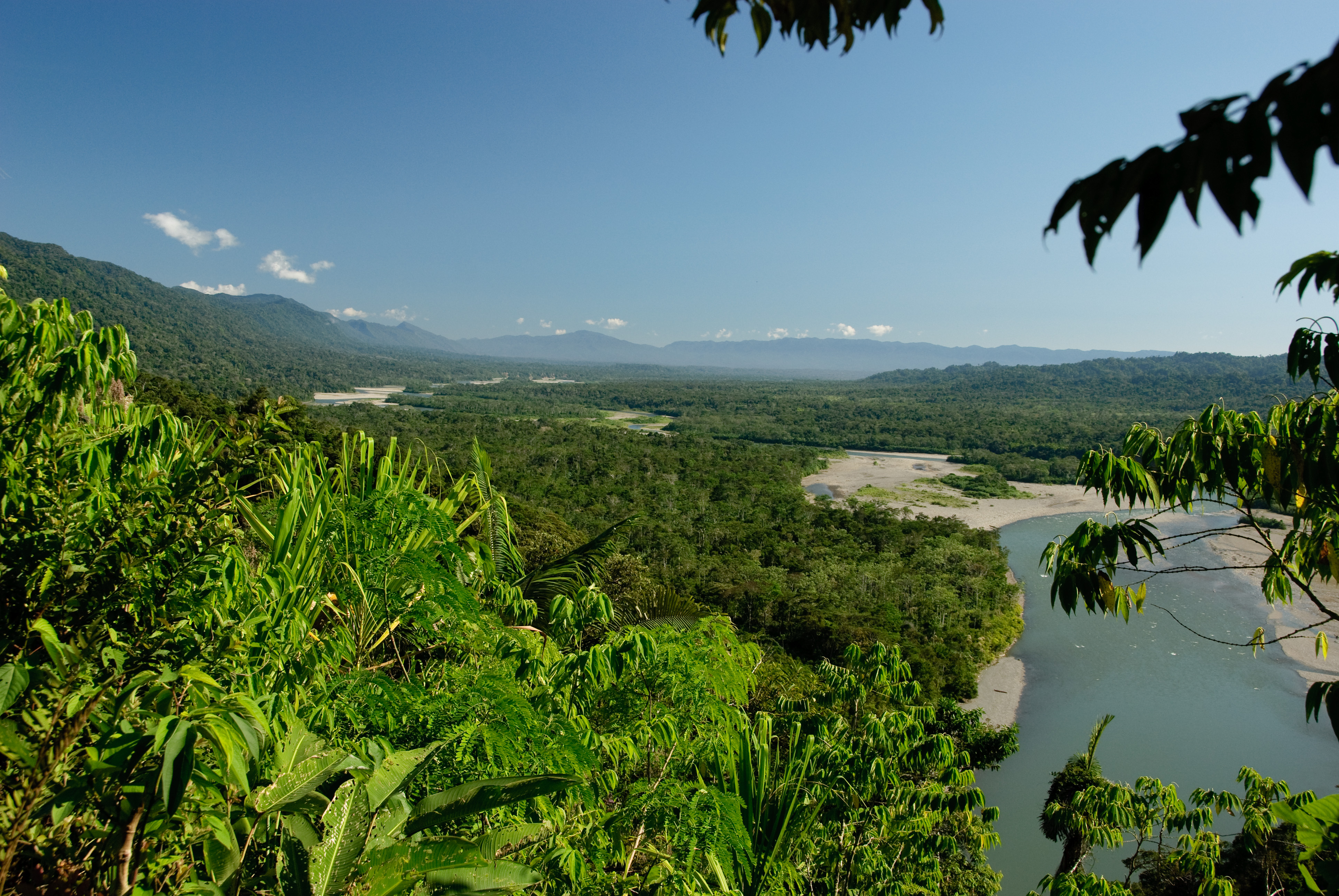
Lowland Amazon rainforest in Manu National Park

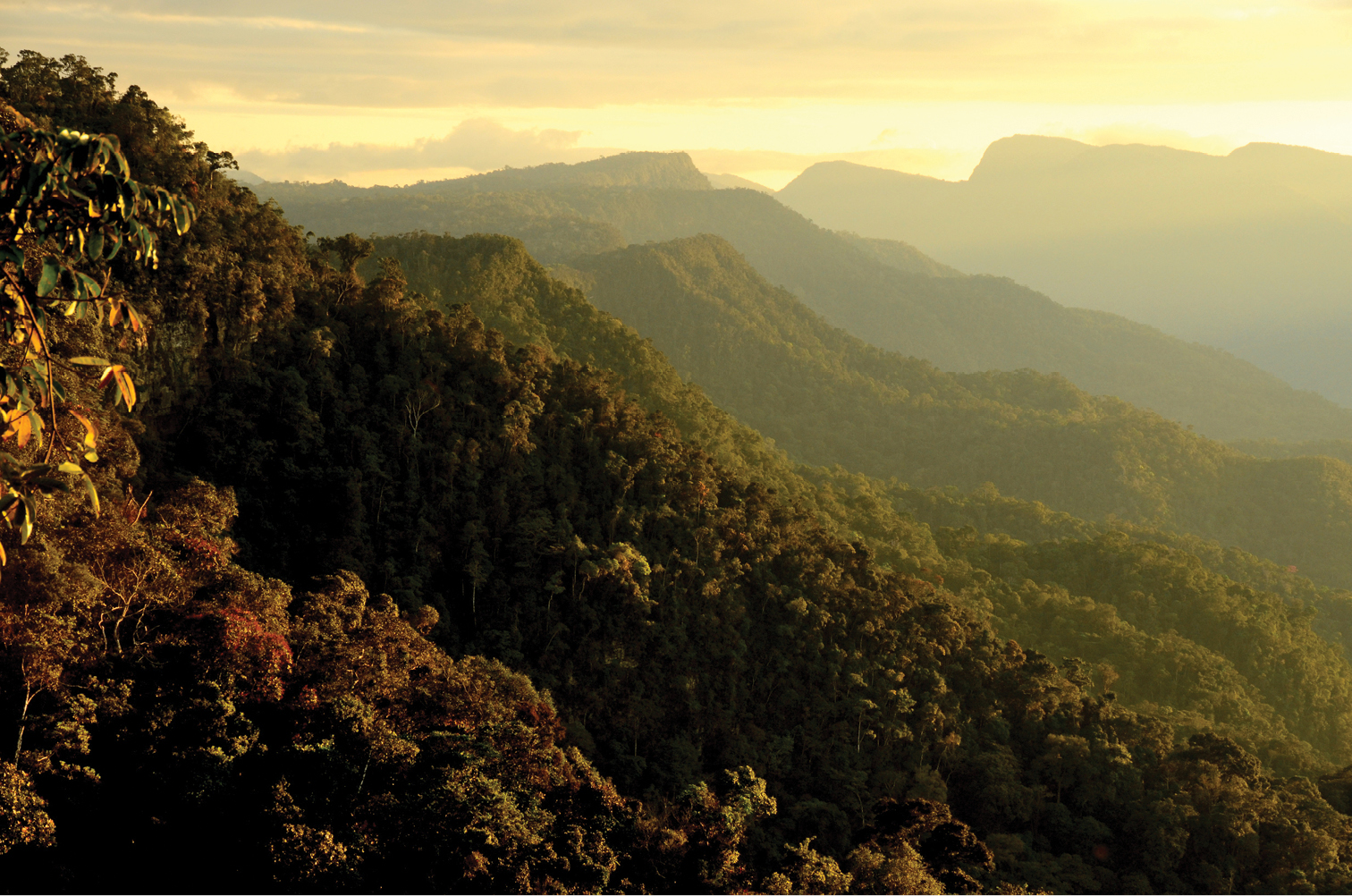
A mist-covered ridge in Cordillera Azul National Park, highlighting the park's lush terrain.

National parks are areas established by law to preserve one or more representative ecosystems in their natural state, safeguarding associated wildlife, cultural features, and scenic values. Human activities are restricted to indirect uses: scientific research and regulated tourism in designated zones. Peru currently has 15 national parks.

† Blue – UNESCO Biosphere Reserve
‡ Purple – Park designated as both a World Heritage Site and Biosphere Reserve

National Parks
Name	Location (region)	Established	Area (2026)	Annual visitors (2025)
Cutervo National Park	Cajamarca; 6°12′7″S 78°47′18″W	20 September 1961	8,214.23 ha (20,298 acres)	403
Tingo María National Park	Huánuco; 9°22′37″S 75°59′53″W	14 May 1965	4,777 ha (11,804 acres)	191,229
Manu National Park ‡	Cusco and Madre de Dios; 11°51′23″S 71°43′17″W	29 May 1973	1,716,295.22 ha (4,241,058 acres)	21,512
Huascarán National Park ‡	Ancash; 9°20′0″S 77°24′0″W	1 July 1975	340,000 ha (840,158 acres)	235,138
Cerros de Amotape National Park †	Tumbes and Piura; 4°08′52″S 80°35′24″W	22 July 1975	152,045.13 ha (375,712 acres)	2,221
Rio Abiseo National Park ‡	San Martín; 7°45′0″S 77°15′0″W	11 August 1983	274,520 ha (678,354 acres)	933
Yanachaga–Chemillén National Park †	Pasco; 10°24′15″S 75°18′38″W	29 August 1986	122,000 ha (301,469 acres)	6,560
Bahuaja-Sonene National Park	Madre de Dios and Puno; 13°16′0″S 69°27′0″W	17 July 1996	1,091,416 ha (2,696,948 acres)	2
Cordillera Azul National Park	San Martín, Loreto, Ucayali, and Huánuco; 7°45′0″S 75°56′24″W	21 May 2001	1,353,190.85 ha (3,343,807 acres)	0
Otishi National Park †	Junín and Cusco; 11°40′0″S 73°05′0″W	14 January 2003	305,973.05 ha (756,076 acres)	Unknown
Alto Purús National Park	Ucayali and Madre de Dios; 10°49′12″S 71°38′24″W	18 November 2004	2,510,694.41 ha (6,204,061 acres)	Unknown
Ichigkat Muja – Cordillera del Cóndor National Park	Amazonas; 3°23′34″S 78°6′49″W	9 August 2007	88,477 ha (218,631 acres)	Unknown
Güeppi-Sekime National Park	Loreto; 0°28′48″S 74°54′36″W	25 October 2012	203,628.51 ha (503,177 acres)	Unknown
Sierra del Divisor National Park	Loreto and Ucayali; 7°16′31″S 74°4′25″W	9 November 2015	1,354,485.10 ha (3,347,006 acres)	Unknown
Yaguas National Park	Loreto; 2°55′0″S 71°31′16″W	10 January 2018	868,927.84 ha (2,147,167 acres)	Unknown

=== National reserves ===
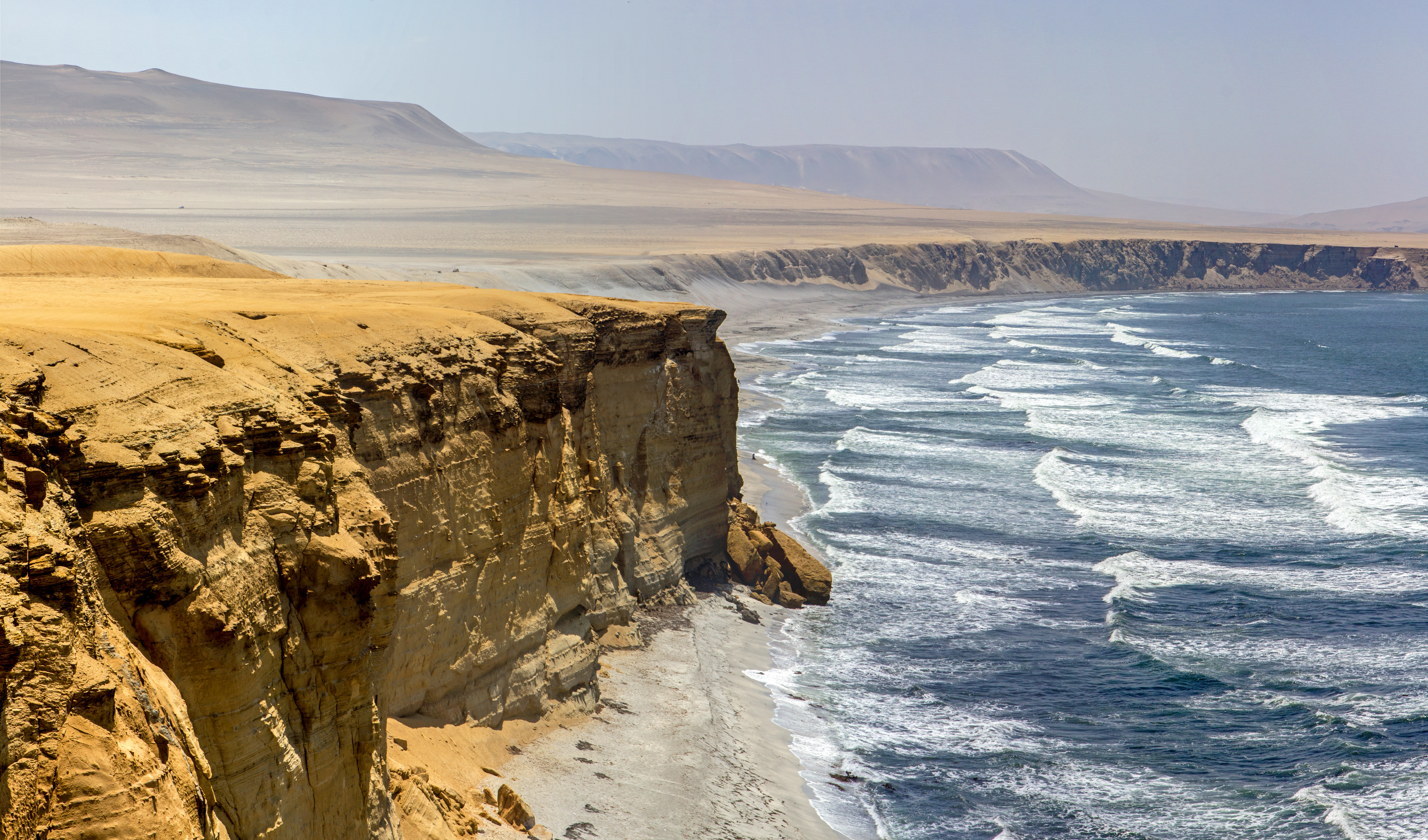
Coastal cliffs and desert sands of Paracas National Reserve

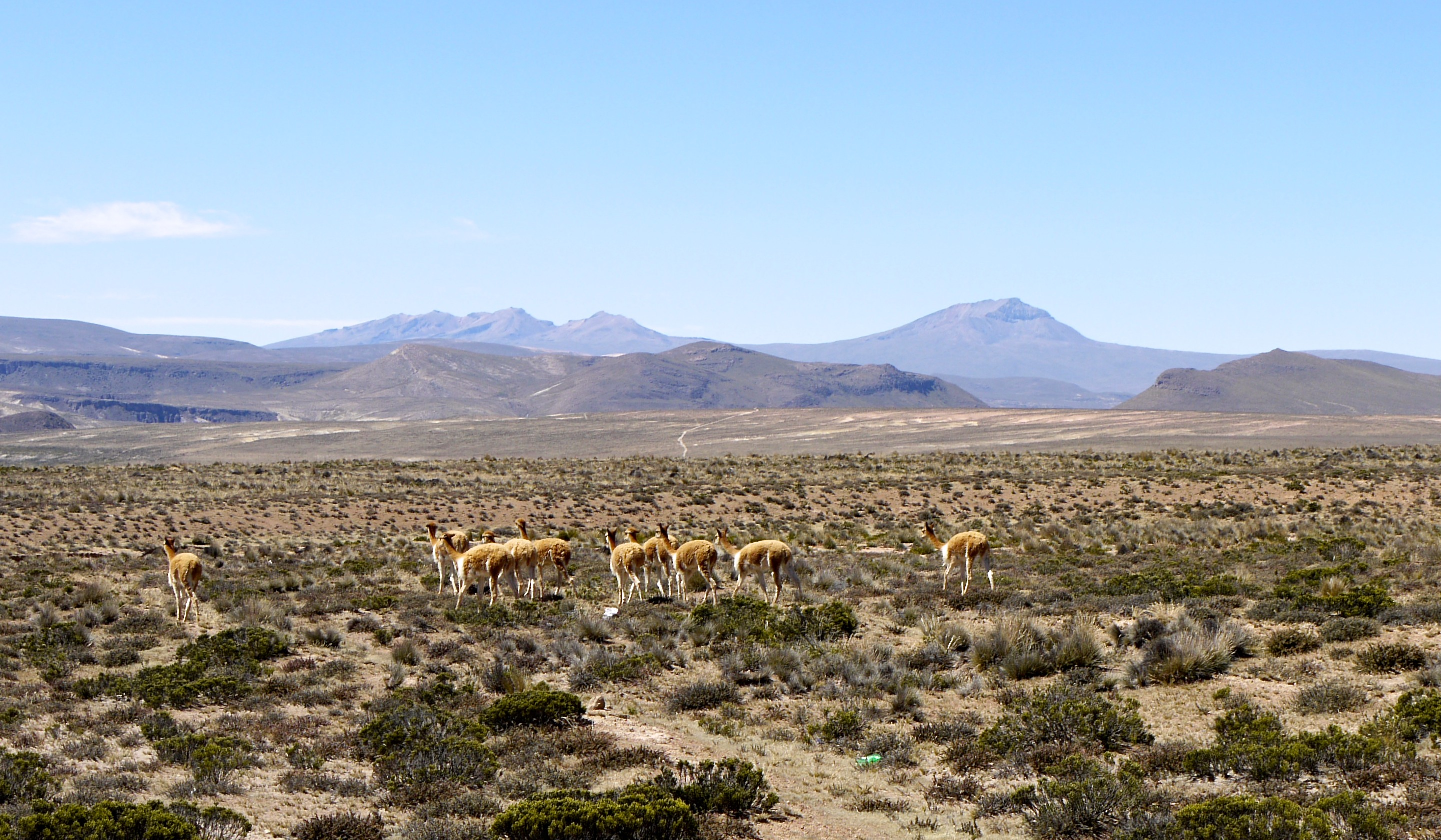
Wild vicuñas grazing on puna grassland at Salinas y Aguada Blanca National Reserve

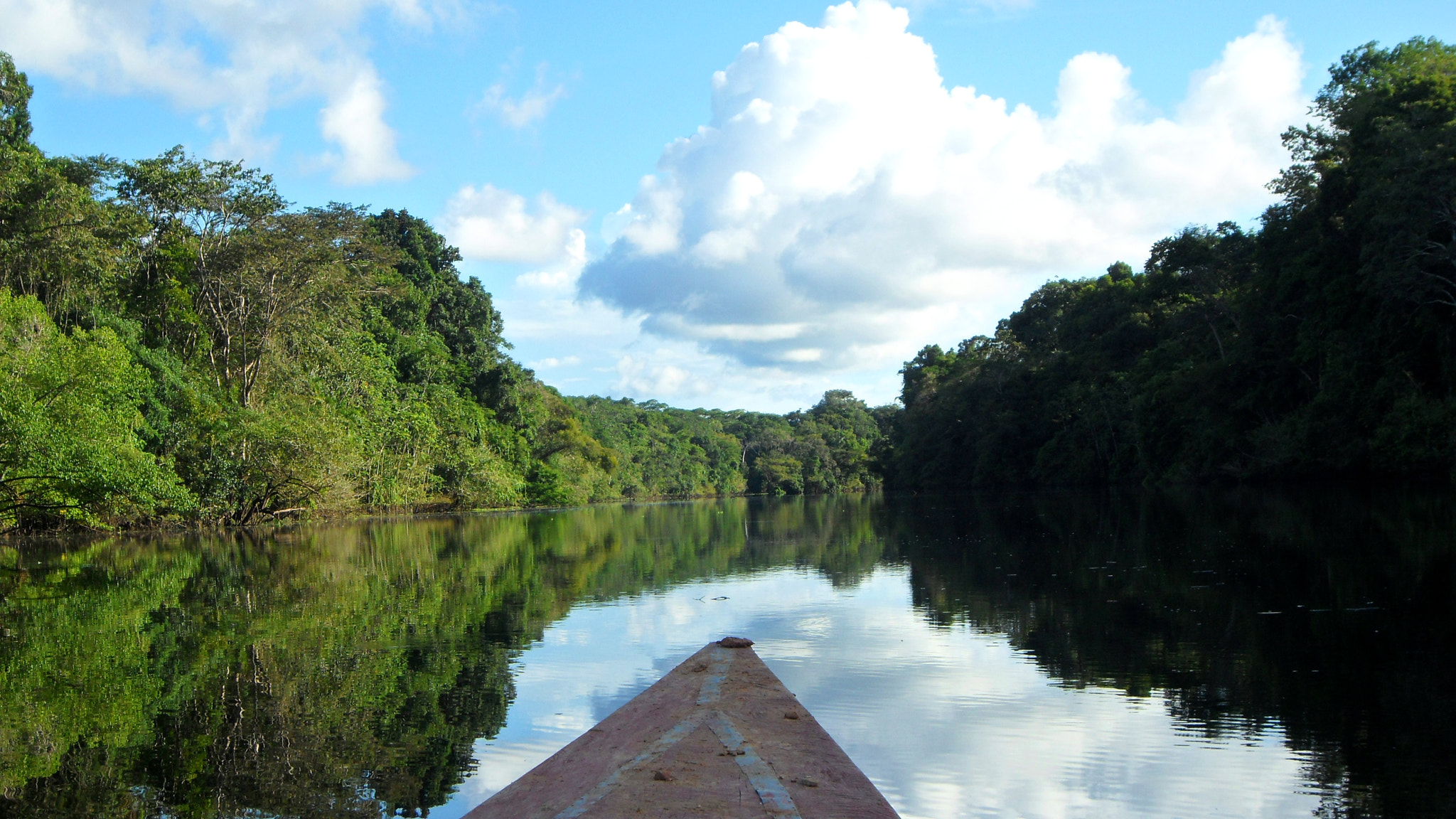
Seasonally flooded forest along the Marañón River in Pacaya Samiria National Reserve

National reserves are legally constituted, permanent areas aiming both to conserve biodiversity and to permit sustainable use of wild flora and fauna. As direct‑use zones, they operate under management plans that authorize traditional resource use by local communities alongside conservation goals. There are 18 national reserves in Peru.

‡ Purple – Reserve designated as both a World Heritage Site and Biosphere Reserve
§ Rose – Ramsar site

National Reserves
Name	Location (region)	Established	Area (2026)	Annual visitors (2025)
Pampa Galeras – Barbara D'Achille National Reserve	Ayacucho; 14°41′35″S 74°22′08″W	18 May 1967	6,500 ha (16,062 acres)	2,119
Junín National Reserve §	Junín and Pasco; 10°53′14″S 76°09′26″W	7 August 1974	53,000 ha (130,966 acres)	17
Paracas National Reserve §	Ica; 13°53′43″S 76°16′15″W	25 September 1975	335,000 ha (827,803 acres)	747,366
Lachay National Reserve	Lima; 11°21′30″S 77°22′10″W	21 June 1977	5,070 ha (12,528 acres)	69,182
Titicaca National Reserve §	Puno; 15°50′11″S 69°20′19″W	31 October 1978	36,180 ha (89,403 acres)	105,896
Salinas y Aguada Blanca National Reserve §	Arequipa and Moquegua; 16°06′08″S 71°13′08″W	9 August 1979	366,936 ha (906,719 acres)	733
Calipuy National Reserve	La Libertad; 8°34′8″S 78°19′30″W	8 January 1981	64,000 ha (158,147 acres)	273
Pacaya-Samiria National Reserve §	Loreto; 5°15′0″S 74°40′0″W	25 February 1972	2,080,000 ha (5,139,792 acres)	15,079
Tambopata National Reserve	Madre de Dios; 12°55′14″S 69°19′55″W	4 September 2000	274,690 ha (678,774 acres)	89,105
Allpahuayo-Mishana National Reserve	Loreto; 3°55′41″S 73°33′22″W	15 January 2004	58,069.90 ha (143,494 acres)	2,217
Tumbes National Reserve †	Tumbes; 3°53′49″S 80°18′4″W	7 July 2006	19,266.72 ha (47,609 acres)	Unknown
Matsés National Reserve	Loreto; 5°43′48″S 73°22′29″W	26 August 2009	420,635.34 ha (1,039,413 acres)	Unknown
Guano Islands, Islets, and Capes National Reserve	Ancash, Arequipa, Lima, Ica, Moquegua and Pacific Ocean; 12°18′9″S 76°54′8″W	31 December 2009	140,833.47 ha (348,007 acres)	691,621
Pucacuro National Reserve	Loreto; 2°26′53″S 75°20′29″W	23 October 2010	637,953.83 ha (1,576,418 acres)	Unknown
San Fernando National Reserve	Ica; 14°58′17″S 75°17′42″W	9 July 2011	154,716.37 ha (382,312 acres)	913
Dorsal de Nasca National Reserve	Pacific Ocean; 16°13′50″S 77°26′14″W	5 June 2021	6,239,205.75 ha (15,417,413 acres)	Unknown
Illescas National Reserve	Piura; 5°58′28″S 81°5′51″W	24 December 2021	36,550.70 ha (90,319 acres)	784
Mar Tropical de Grau National Reserve	Pacific Ocean; 5°12′35″S 81°12′21″W	26 April 2024	115,675.89 ha (285,841 acres)	Unknown

=== National sanctuaries ===
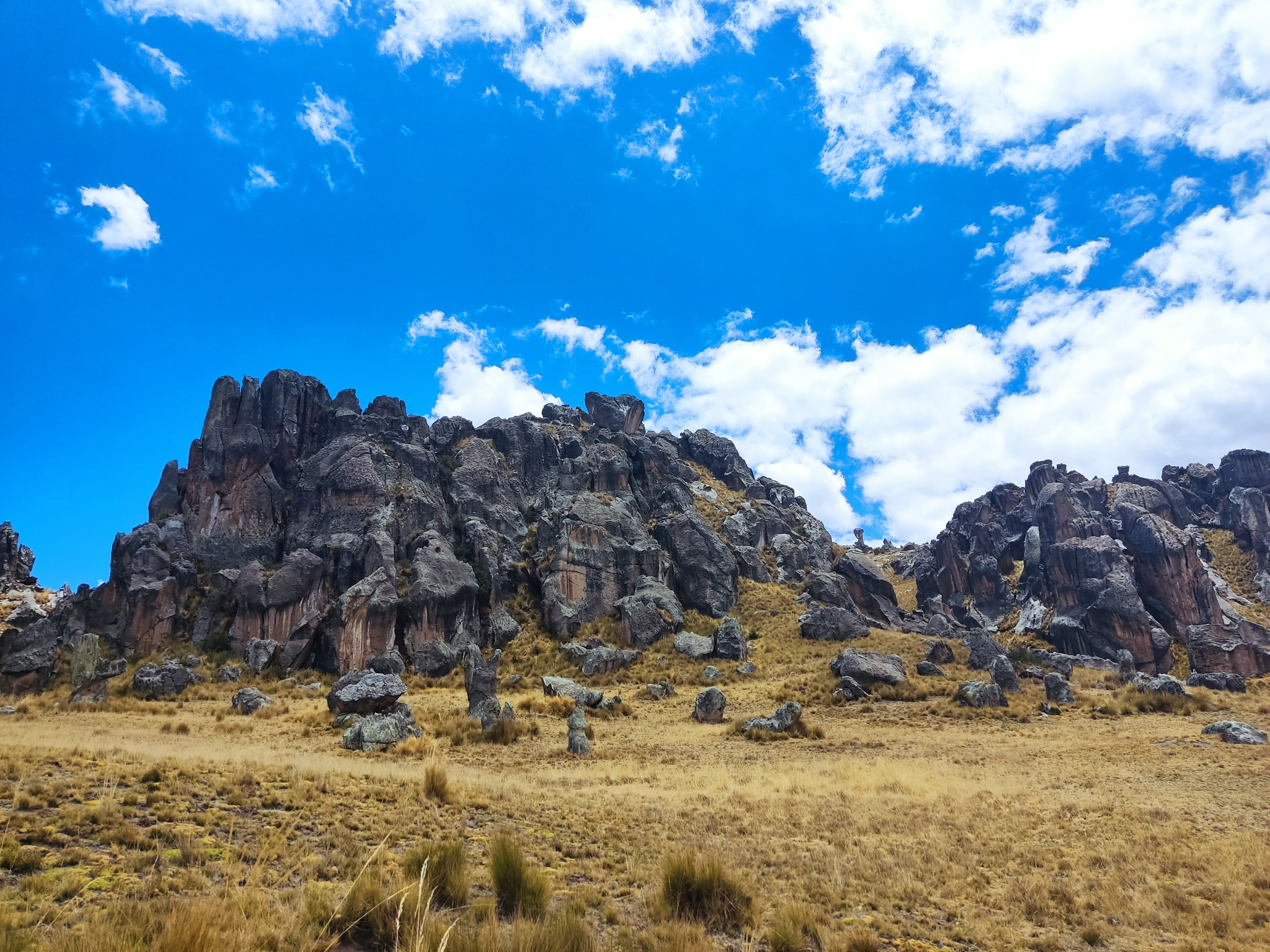
Eroded rock formations of the Huayllay Stone Forest within the Huayllay National Sanctuary in the high central Andes

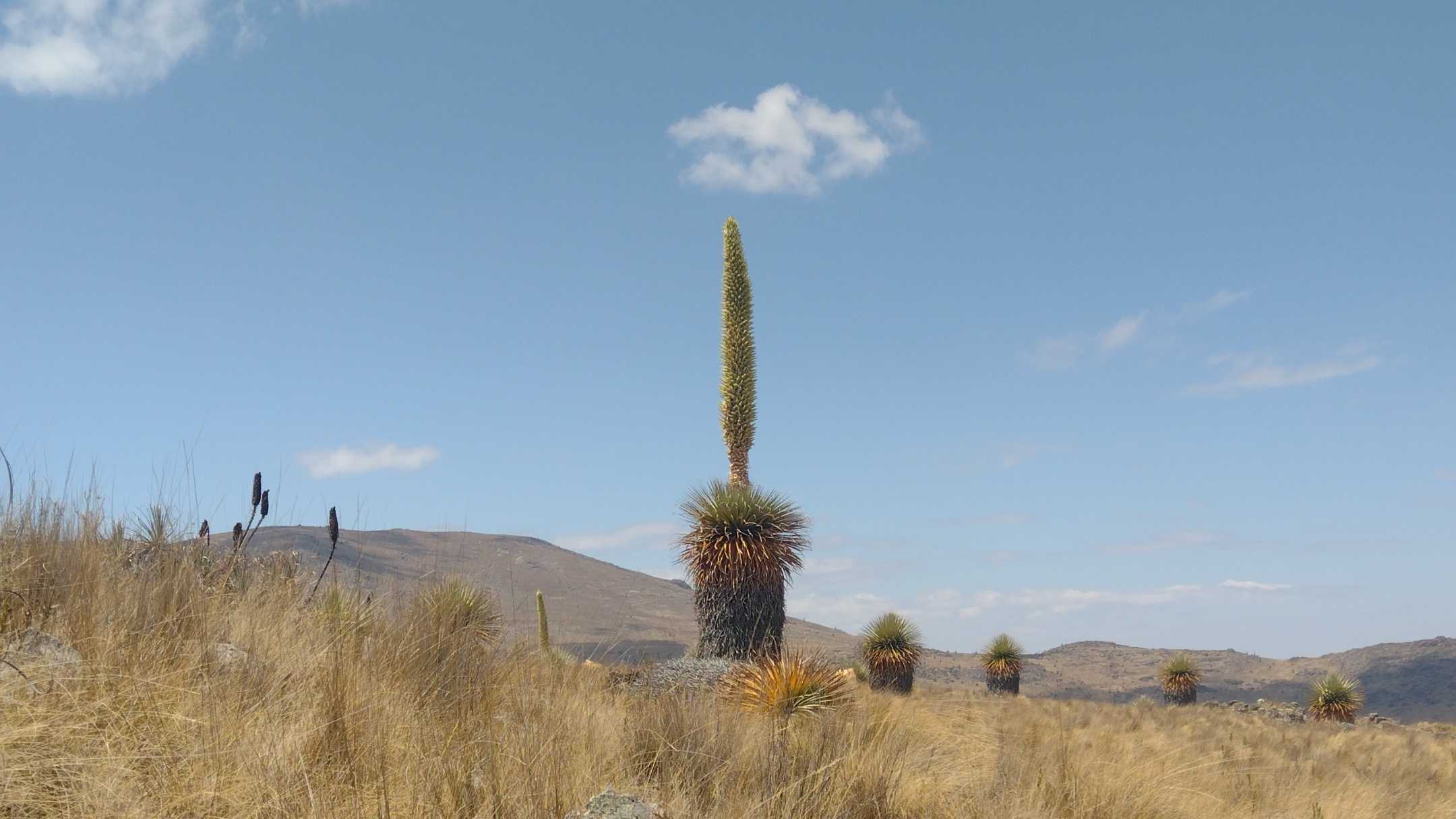
A blooming Puya raimondii, the largest species of bromeliad, in Calipuy National Sanctuary

National sanctuaries safeguard the habitat of a particular species or community of plants and animals, as well as natural formations of scientific or scenic interest. They allow indirect uses only, such as scientific study and tourism, but strictly within zones designated for those activities. Peru is home to 9 national sanctuaries.

† Blue – UNESCO Biosphere Reserve
§ Rose – Ramsar site

National Sanctuaries
Name	Location (region)	Established	Area (2026)	Annual visitors (2025)
Huayllay National Sanctuary	Pasco; 11°0′1″S 76°21′57″W	7 August 1978	6,815 ha (16,840 acres)	80,347
Calipuy National Sanctuary	La Libertad; 8°20′56″S 78°17′42″W	8 January 1981	4,500 ha (11,120 acres)	273
Lagunas de Mejía National Sanctuary §	Arequipa; 17°8′49″S 71°51′47″W	24 February 1984	690.60 ha (1,707 acres)	5,741
Ampay National Sanctuary	Apurímac; 13°34′44″S 72°53′24″W	23 July 1987	3,635.50 ha (8,984 acres)	6,936
Manglares de Tumbes National Sanctuary†	Tumbes; 3°25′12″S 80°16′30″W	2 March 1988	2,972 ha (7,344 acres)	1,721
Megantoni National Sanctuary†	Cusco; 12°13′14″S 72°21′41″W	17 October 2004	1,166 ha (2,881 acres)	1,271
Pampa Hermosa National Sanctuary†	Junín; 11°2′12″S 75°28′50″W	26 March 2009	11,543.74 ha (28,525 acres)	330
Tabaconas Namballe National Sanctuary §	Cajamarca; 5°9′25″S 79°16′23″W	20 May 1988	32,124.87 ha (79,382 acres)	0
Cordillera de Colán National Sanctuary	Amazonas; 5°35′0″S 78°14′0″W	9 December 2009	39,215.80 ha (96,904 acres)	Unknown

=== Historic sanctuaries ===
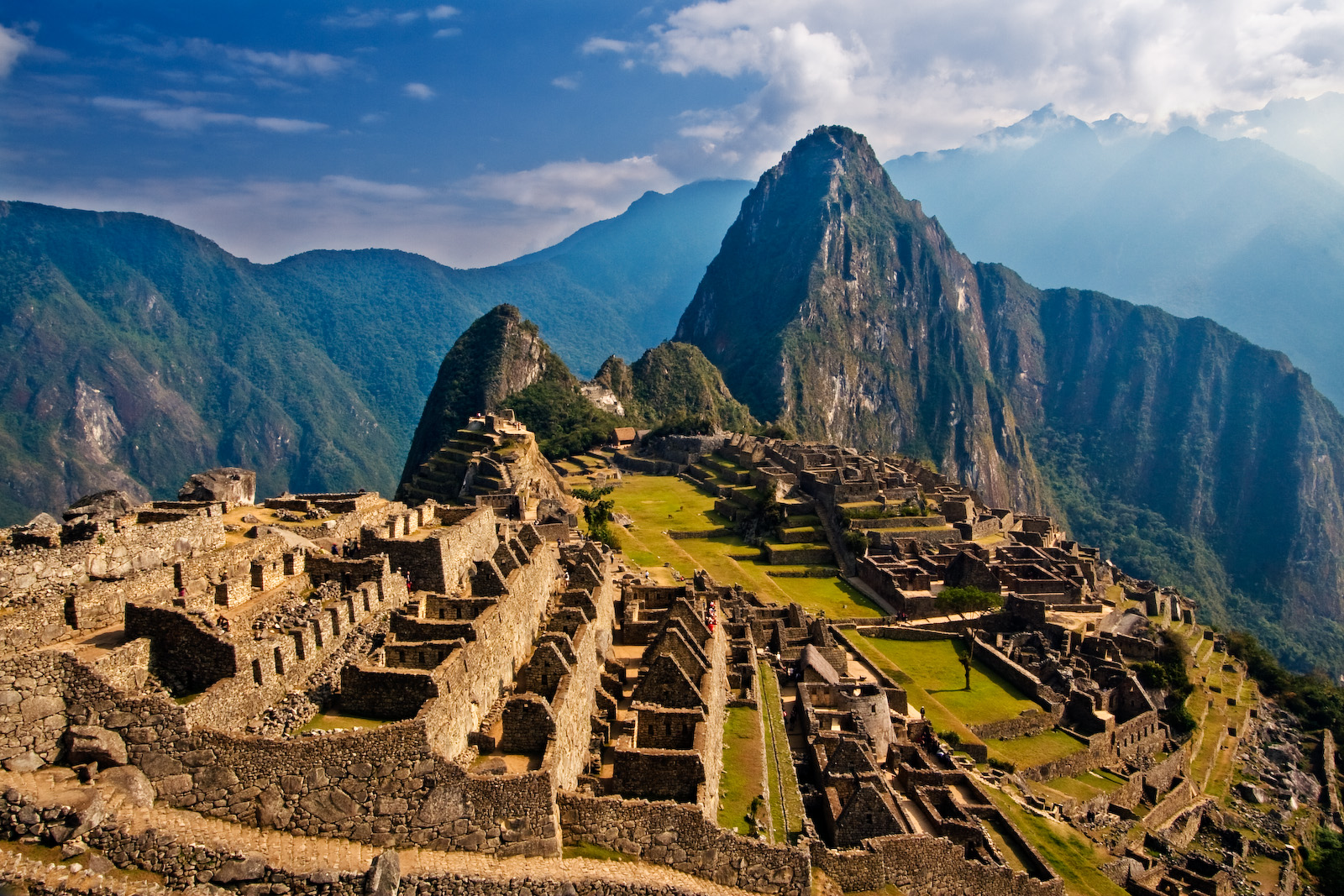
The Inca ruins of Machu Picchu, situated on Andean ridges within the Machu Picchu Historic Sanctuary

Historic sanctuaries preserve areas that combine significant natural values with archaeological or monumental heritage, or sites where key events in national history took place. Like other indirect‑use categories, they permit research and regulated tourism only in specified sectors. There are 4 historic sanctuaries in Peru.

* Green – UNESCO World Heritage Site
† Blue – UNESCO Biosphere Reserve

Historic Sanctuaries
Name	Location (region)	Established	Area (2026)	Annual visitors (2025)
Machu Picchu Historic Sanctuary *	Cusco; 9°20′0″S 77°24′0″W	8 January 1981	32,592 ha (80,537 acres)	197,326 (Note: Figures from the National Service of Natural Protected Areas. These do not include visitors to the citadel, which is administered by the Ministry of Culture and receives about 1.5 million visitors annually.)
Chacamarca Historic Sanctuary	Junín; 11°12′59″S 75°58′12″W	7 August 1974	2,500 ha (6,178 acres)	12,821
Pampa de Ayacucho Historic Sanctuary †	Ayacucho; 13°2′34″S 74°7′51″W	14 August 1980	300 ha (741 acres)	243,086
Bosque de Pómac Historic Sanctuary	Lambayeque; 6°28′25″S 79°46′35″W	1 June 2001	5,887.38 ha (14,548 acres)	15,218

=== Wildlife refuges ===
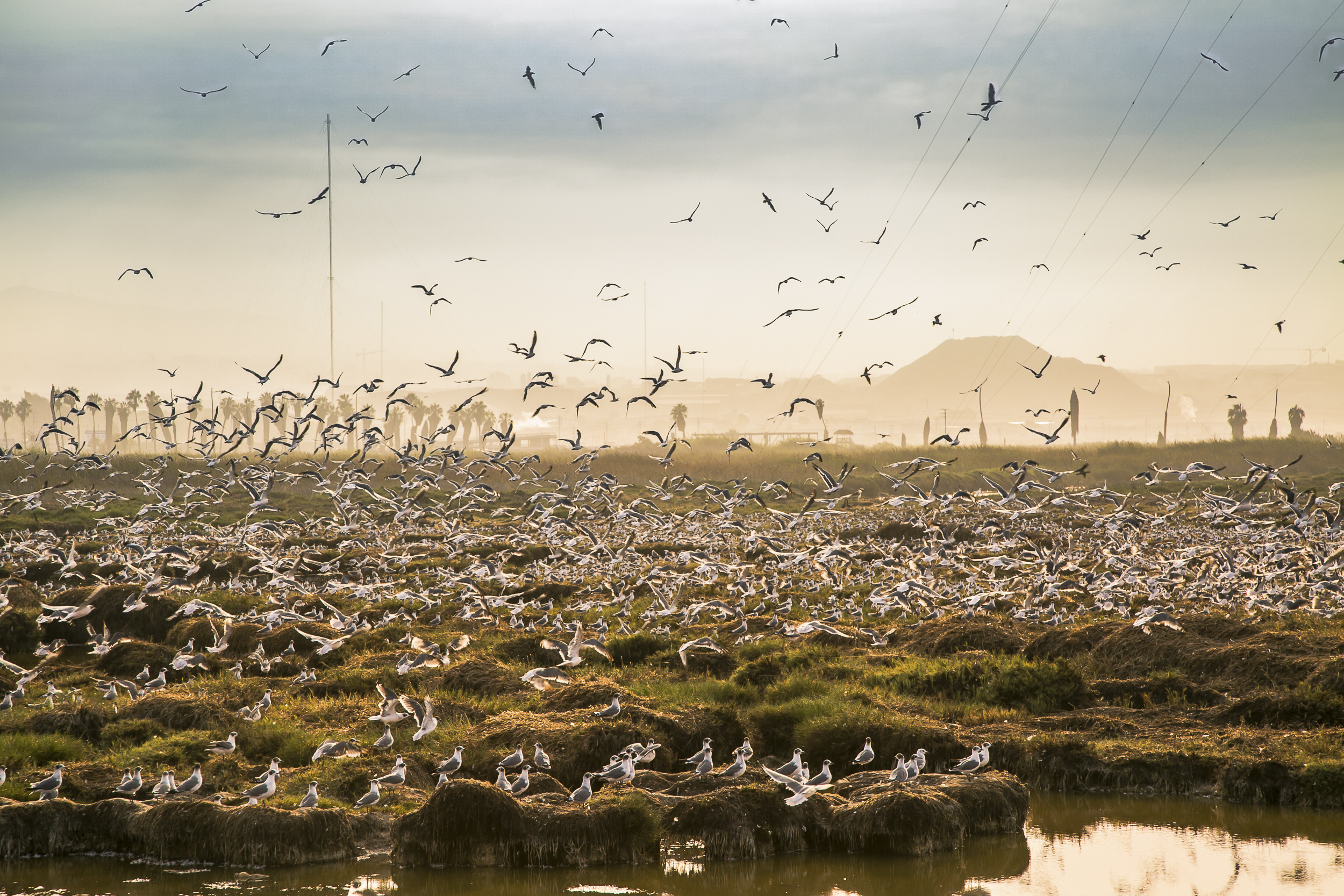
Franklin's gulls (Leucophaeus pipixcan) in the wetlands of Pantanos de Villa Wildlife Refuge

Wildlife refuges protect areas of particular ecological importance, often rare habitats or breeding sites, to maintain or restore populations of wild species. They are direct‑use areas where, under management plans, local communities may continue traditional resource uses that support both livelihoods and conservation. Peru contains 3 wildlife refuges.

Wildlife Refuges
Name	Location (region)	Established	Area (2026)	Annual visitors (2025)
Laquipampa Wildlife Refuge	Lambayeque; 6°21′0″S 79°28′59″W	7 July 2006	8,328.64 ha (20,581 acres)	8
Pantanos de Villa Wildlife Refuge	Lima; 12°12′49″S 76°59′20″W	23 June 2006	263.27 ha (651 acres)	44,797
Bosques Nublados de Udima Wildlife Refuge	Cajamarca; 6°50′41″S 79°2′11″W	21 July 2007	12,183.20 ha (30,105 acres)	Unknown

=== Landscape reserves ===
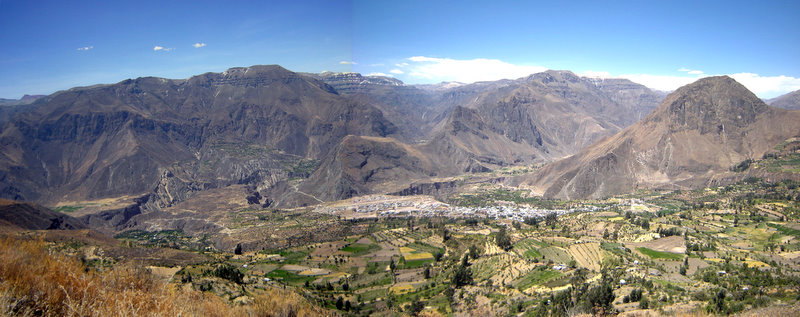
Panorama of Cotahuasi Subbasin Landscape Reserve, showing rugged Andean topography

Landscape reserves maintain geographic areas where human activity and the natural environment have coexisted harmoniously, yielding significant natural and cultural values. They allow sustainable traditional resource use by local populations under management plans that ensure both conservation and livelihood needs. Peru currently designates 2 landscape reserves.

Landscape Reserves
Name	Location (region)	Established	Area (2026)	Annual visitors (2025)
Nor Yauyos-Cochas Landscape Reserve	Lima and Junín; 12°2′9″S 75°51′42″W	1 May 2001	221,268.48 ha (546,766 acres)	81,990
Cotahuasi Subbasin Landscape Reserve	Arequipa; 15°3′4″S 72°55′12″W	23 May 2005	490,550 ha (1,212,175 acres)	10,407

=== Communal reserves ===
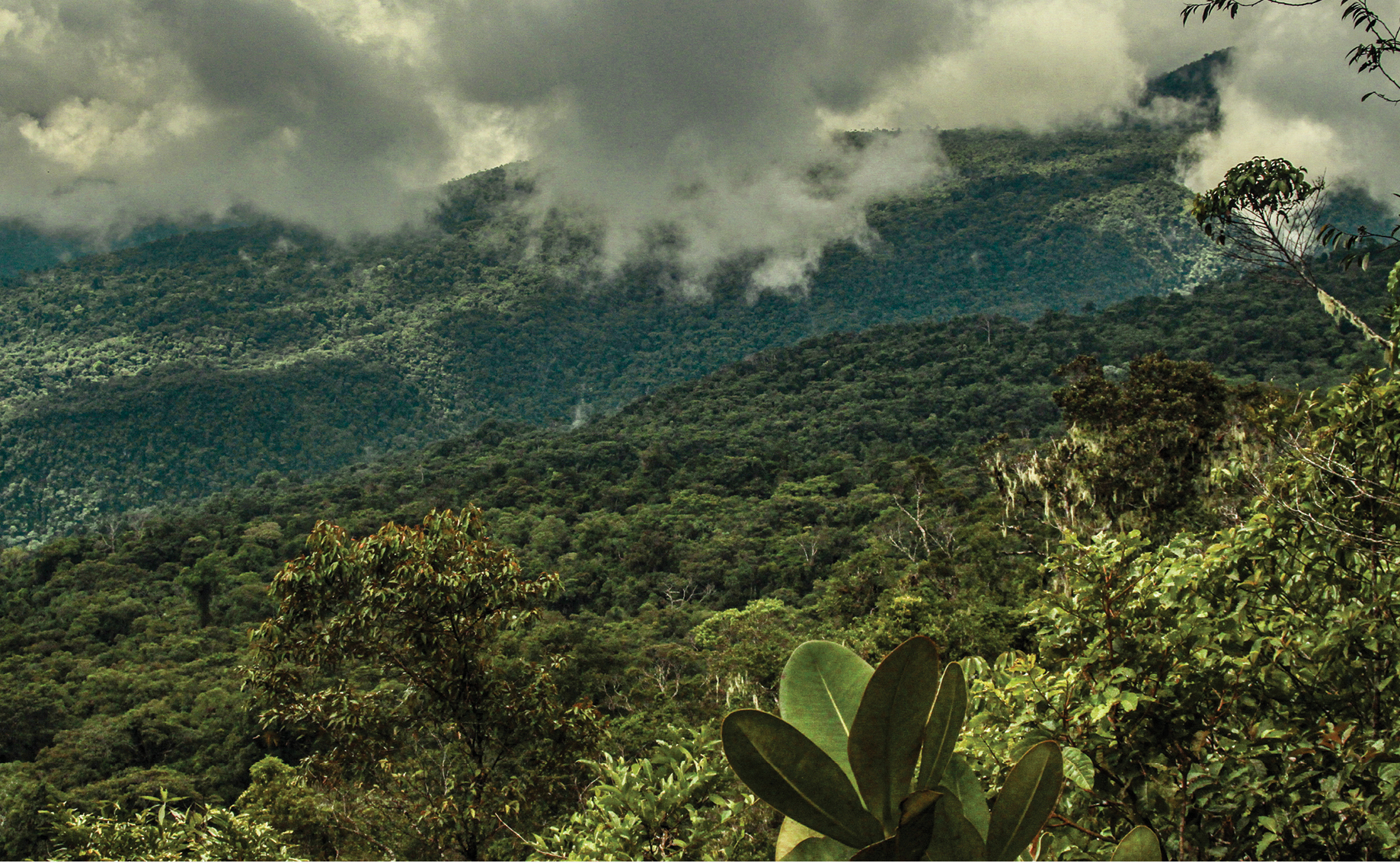
Montane forest in El Sira Communal Reserve

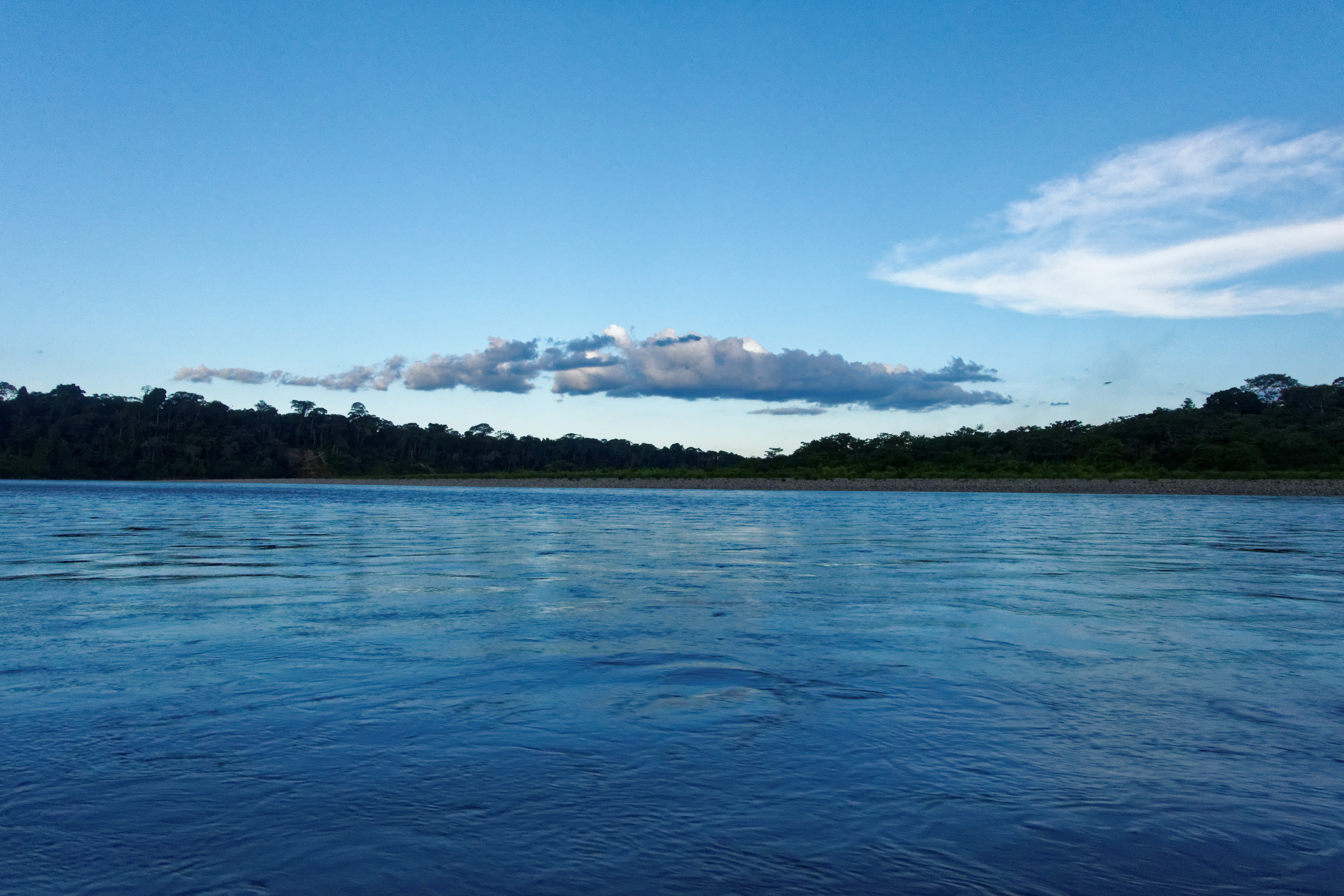
Madre de Dios River and rainforest in the buffer zone of Amarakaeri Communal Reserve

Communal reserves are managed through contracts between rural communities and SERNANP to conserve wildlife for the benefit of neighboring populations. Under these agreements and management plans, communities act as co‑administrators and carry out sustainable traditional uses of natural resources. There are 11 communal reserves in Peru.

† Blue – UNESCO Biosphere Reserve

Communal Reserves
Name	Location (region)	Established	Area (2026)	Annual visitors (2025)
Yanesha Communal Reserve †	Pasco; 10°17′56″S 75°16′19″W	28 April 1988	34,746.38 ha (85,860 acres)	83
El Sira Communal Reserve †	Huánuco, Pasco, and Ucayali; 9°52′26″S 74°30′43″W	22 June 2001	616,413 ha (1,523,190 acres)	Unknown
Amarakaeri Communal Reserve	Madre de Dios; 12°47′0″S 70°57′16″W	9 May 2002	402,335.96 ha (994,194 acres)	Unknown
Asháninka Communal Reserve	Cusco and Junín; 11°46′44″S 73°27′17″W	14 January 2003	184,468.38 ha (455,831 acres)	Unknown
Machiguenga Communal Reserve	Cusco; 11°45′20″S 73°34′06″W	14 January 2003	218,905.63 ha (540,928 acres)	Unknown
Purús Communal Reserve	Ucayali and |Madre de Dios; 10°11′01″S 71°04′17″W	18 November 2004	202,033.21 ha (499,235 acres)	Unknown
Tuntanain Communal Reserve	Amazonas; 4°6′36″S 78°3′36″W	10 August 2007	94,967.68 ha (234,670 acres)	Unknown
Chayu Nain Communal Reserve	Amazonas; 5°26′26″S 78°15′26″W	9 December 2009	23,597.76 ha (58,311 acres)	Unknown
Airo Pai Communal Reserve	Loreto; 0°39′01″S 74°54′45″W	25 October 2012	247,887.59 ha (612,544 acres)	Unknown
Huimeki Communal Reserve	Loreto; 0°14′54″S 75°03′22″W	25 October 2012	141,234.46 ha (348,998 acres)	Unknown
Bajo Putumayo Yaguas Communal Reserve	Loreto; 2°31′11″S 70°45′59″W	26 September 2025	160,604.41 ha (396,862 acres)	Unknown

=== Protected forests ===
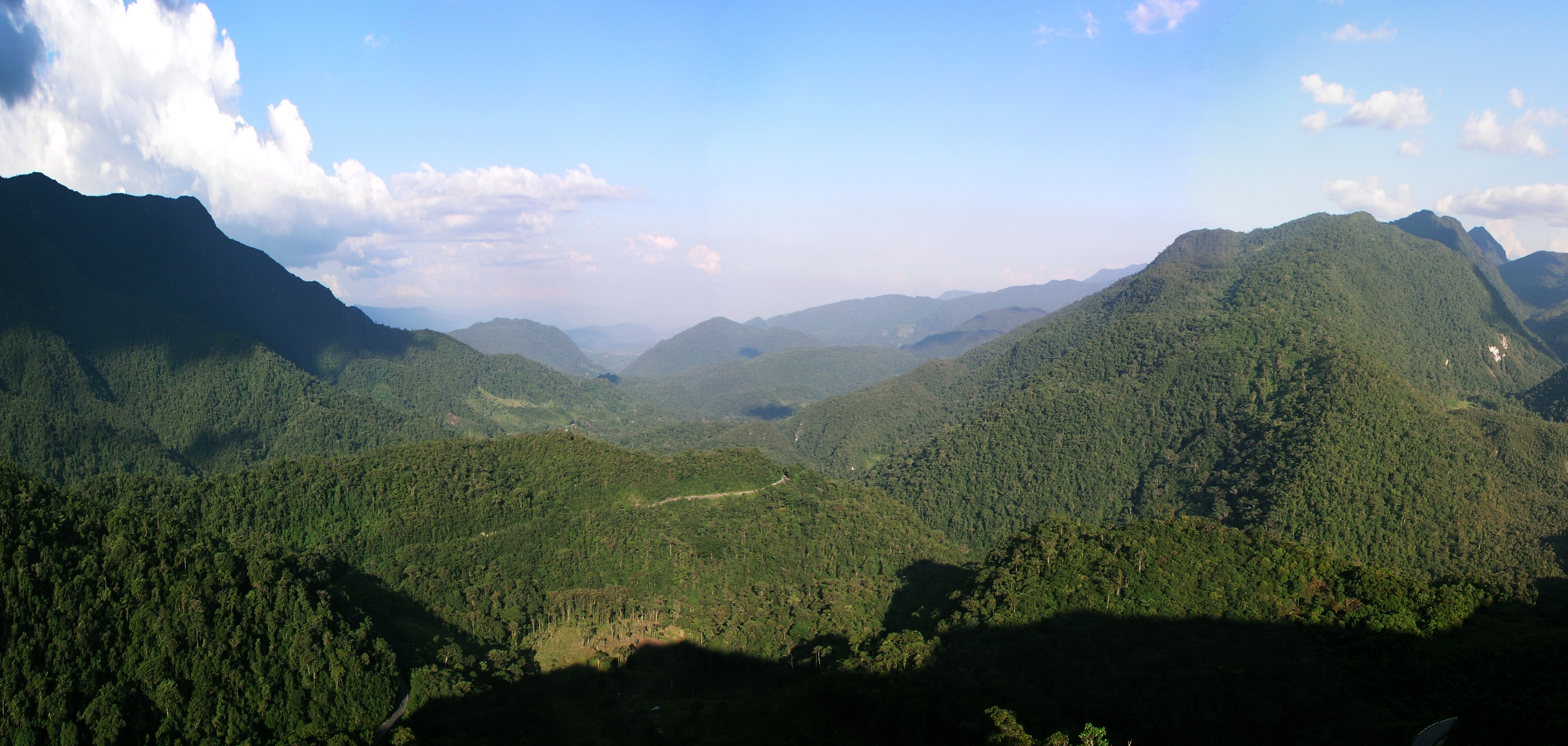
Alto Mayo Protection Forest from Abra Patricia mountain pass

Protection forests conserve fragile lands such as upper watersheds, riverbanks, and other erosion‑prone areas to stabilize soils and safeguard water resources. These are direct‑use areas where sustainable, traditional harvests by local communities are allowed under formal management plans. There are 7 protected forests in Peru.

† Blue – UNESCO Biosphere Reserve

Protected Forests
Name	Location (region)	Established	Area (2026)	Annual visitors (2025)
Aledaño Bocatoma del Canal Nuevo Imperial Protection Forest	Lima; 13°02′39″S 76°13′07″W	19 May 1980	18.11 ha (45 acres)	Unknown
Puquio Santa Rosa Protection Forest	La Libertad; 8°35′30″S 78°43′10″W	2 September 1982	72.50 ha (179 acres)	Unknown
Pui Pui Protection Forest	Junín; 11°16′03″S 75°04′14″W	31 January 1985	60,000 ha (148,263 acres)	Unknown
San Matías–San Carlos Protection Forest†	Pasco; 10°33′32″S 74°59′35″W	20 March 1987	145,818 ha (360,324 acres)	Unknown
Pagaibamba Protection Forest	Cajamarca; 6°24′53″S 79°04′03″W	19 June 1987	2,078.38 ha (5,136 acres)	Unknown
Alto Mayo Protection Forest	San Martín; 5°38′35″S 77°42′0″W	23 July 1987	182,000 ha (449,732 acres)	1,277
Tijae–Río Nieva Protection Forest	Amazonas and San Martín; 5°30′30″S 77°51′20″W	26 July 2026	30,017.45 ha (74,175 acres)	Unknown

=== Game reserves ===
Game reserves are protected areas set aside for regulated sport hunting of wild species, governed by detailed management plans. They allow local residents to engage in traditional hunting practices within established quotas and seasons to ensure sustainable use. Peru has 2 game reserves.

† Blue – UNESCO Biosphere Reserve

Game Reserves
Name	Location (region)	Established	Area (2026)	Annual visitors (2025)
El Angolo Game Reserve†	Piura; 4°18′07″S 80°47′47″W	1 July 1975	65,000 ha (160,618 acres)	309
Sunchubamba Game Reserve	Cajamarca and La Libertad; 7°31′43″S 78°29′06″W	22 April 1977	59,735 ha (147,608 acres)	Unknown

=== Reserved zones ===
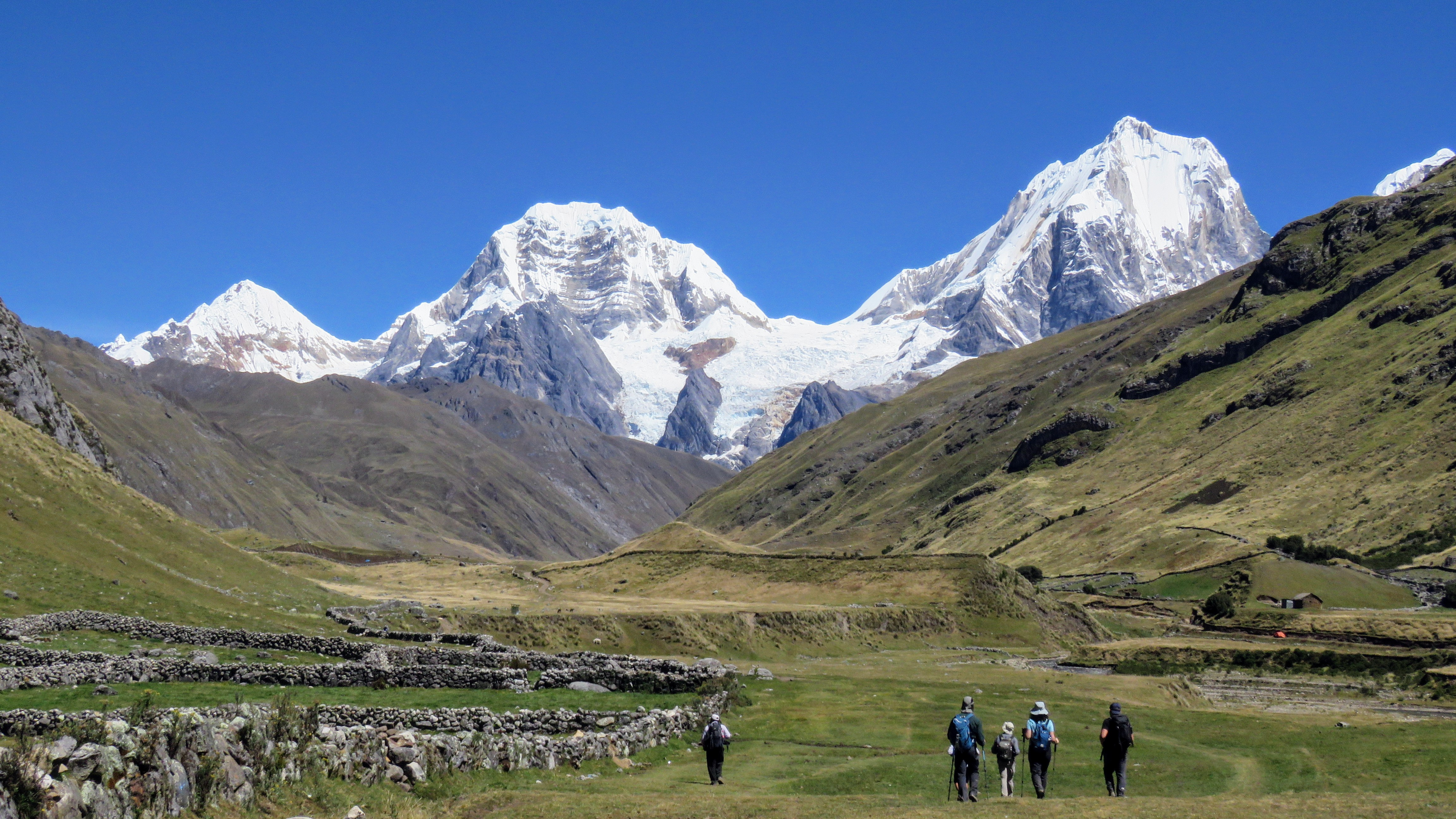
Snow-capped peaks of the Cordillera Huayhuash Reserved Zone

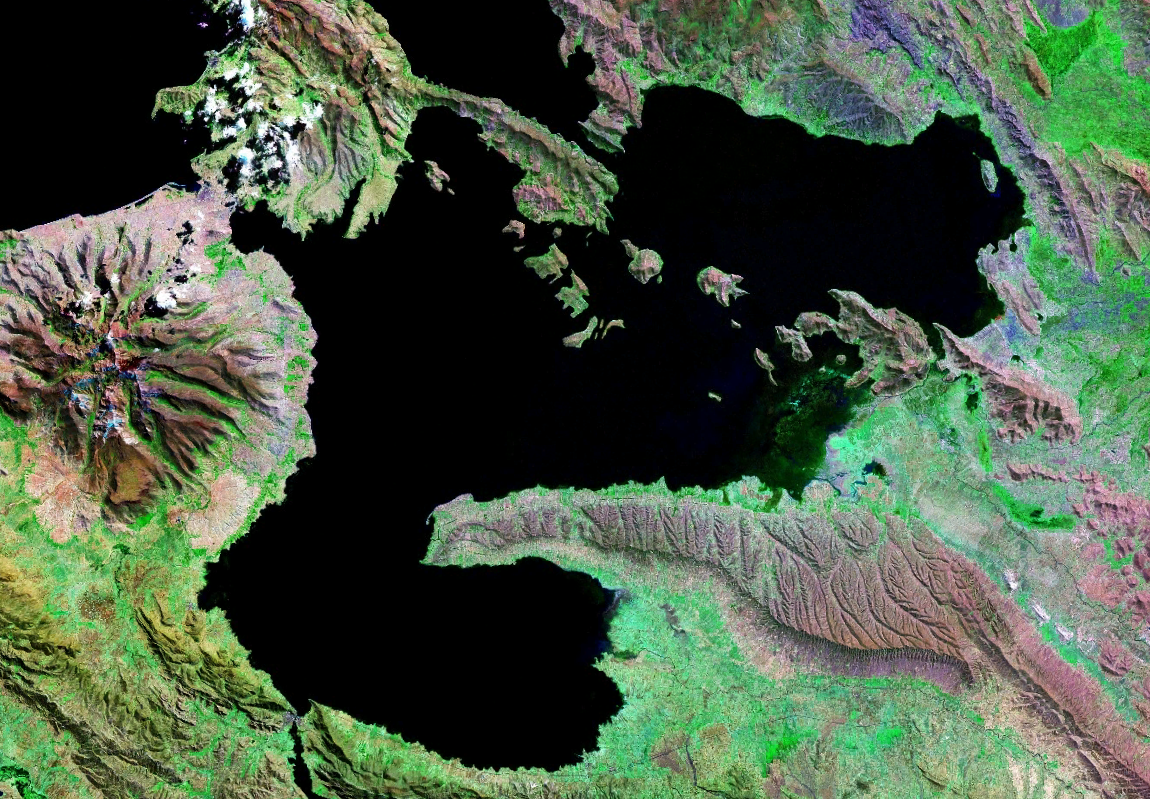
Satellite view of Lago Menor (part of Lake Titicaca), showing the Cerro Khapia Reserved Zone on the left

Reserved zones are areas that meet the basic criteria to be designated as protected natural areas but require further studies to determine their appropriate boundaries, category, and management feasibility. They are considered provisional protections pending full classification within the national system. Peru currently has 6 reserved zones.

Reserved Zones
Name	Location (region)	Established	Area (2026)	Annual visitors (2025)
Chancaybaños Reserved Zone	Cajamarca; 6°34′4″S 78°55′3″W	14 February 1996	2,628 ha (6,494 acres)	4,812
Santiago-Comaina Reserved Zone	Amazonas and Loreto; 4°12′34″S 78°02′09″W	21 January 1999	398,449.44 ha (984,590 acres)	Unknown
Cordillera Huayhuash Reserved Zone	Ancash, Huánuco, and Lima; 10°22′32″S 76°51′24″W	20 December 2002	67,589.76 ha (167,018 acres)	Unknown
Bosque de Zárate Reserved Zone	Lima; 11°55′45″S 76°29′21″W	13 October 2010	545.75 ha (1,349 acres)	Unknown
Cerro Khapia Reserved Zone	Puno; 16°22′34″S 69°07′25″W	28 May 2011	18,313.79 ha (45,254 acres)	Unknown
Ancón Reserved Zone	Lima; 11°44′54″S 77°11′08″W	28 November 2011	2,193.01 ha (5,419 acres)	Unknown

== Regional conservation areas ==
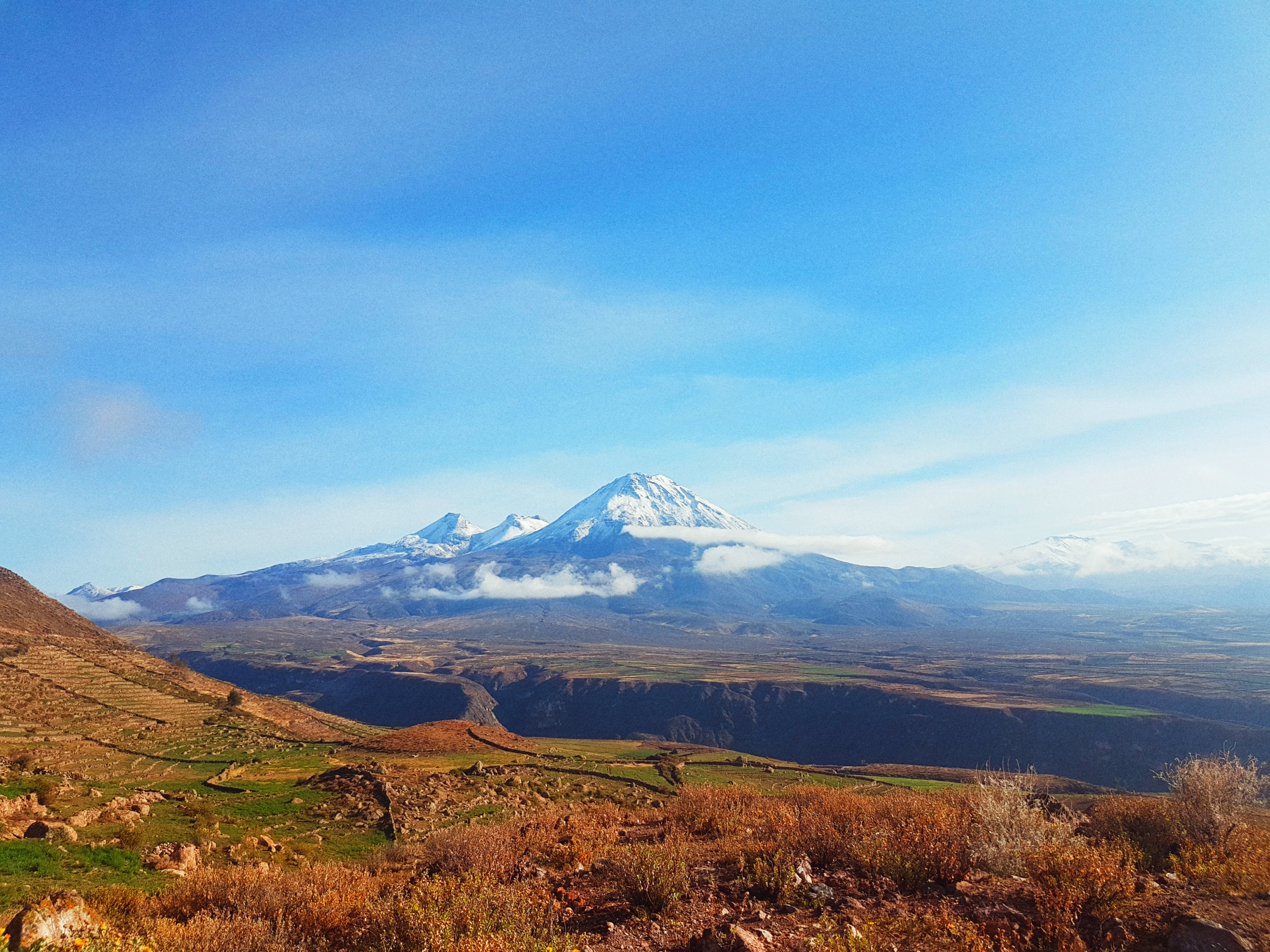
Yucamani volcano viewed from the southwest in Vilacota Maure Conservation Area

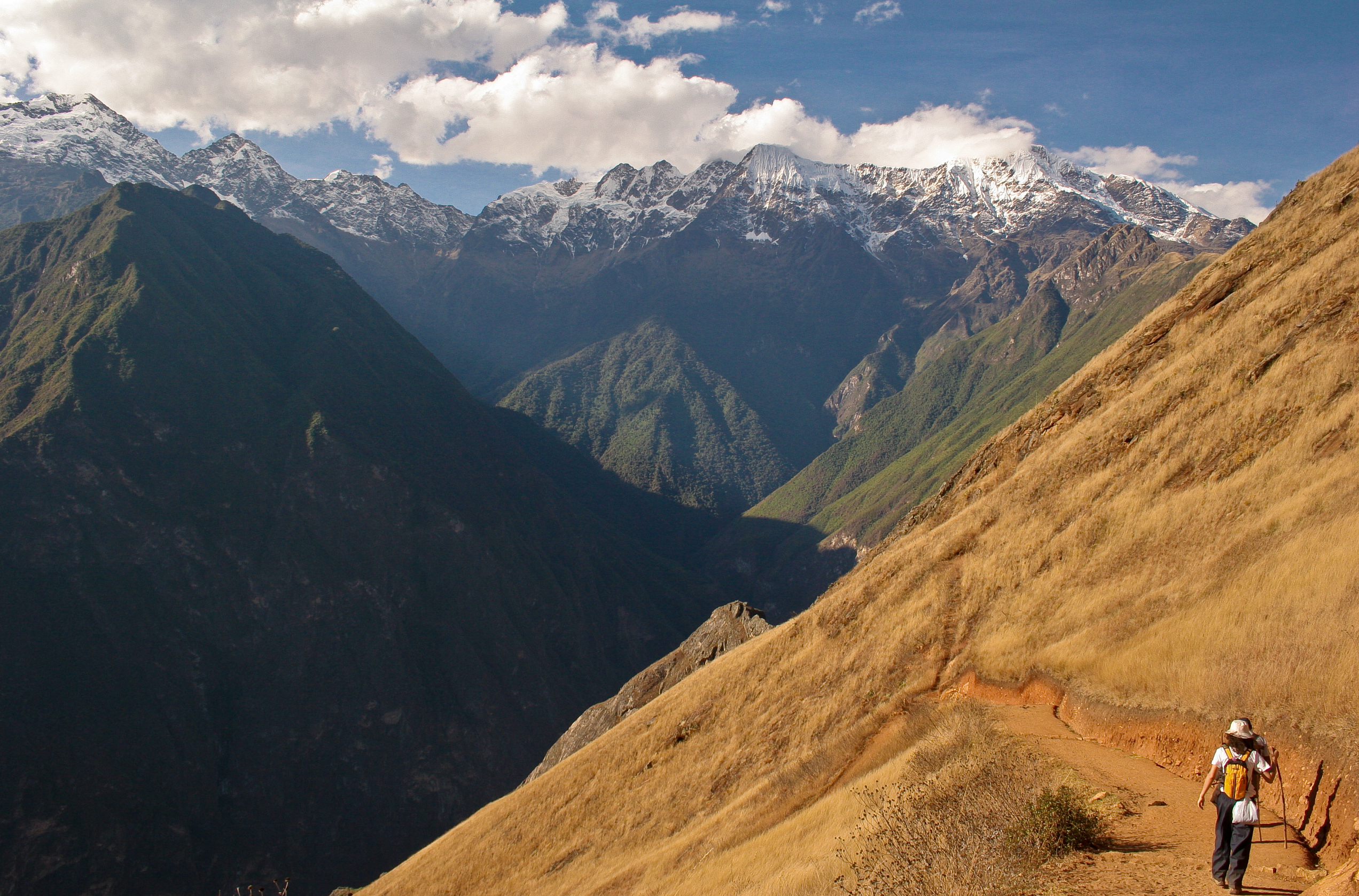
Trail departing Cachora village within the Choquequirao Conservation Area, leading to the Choquequirao ruins

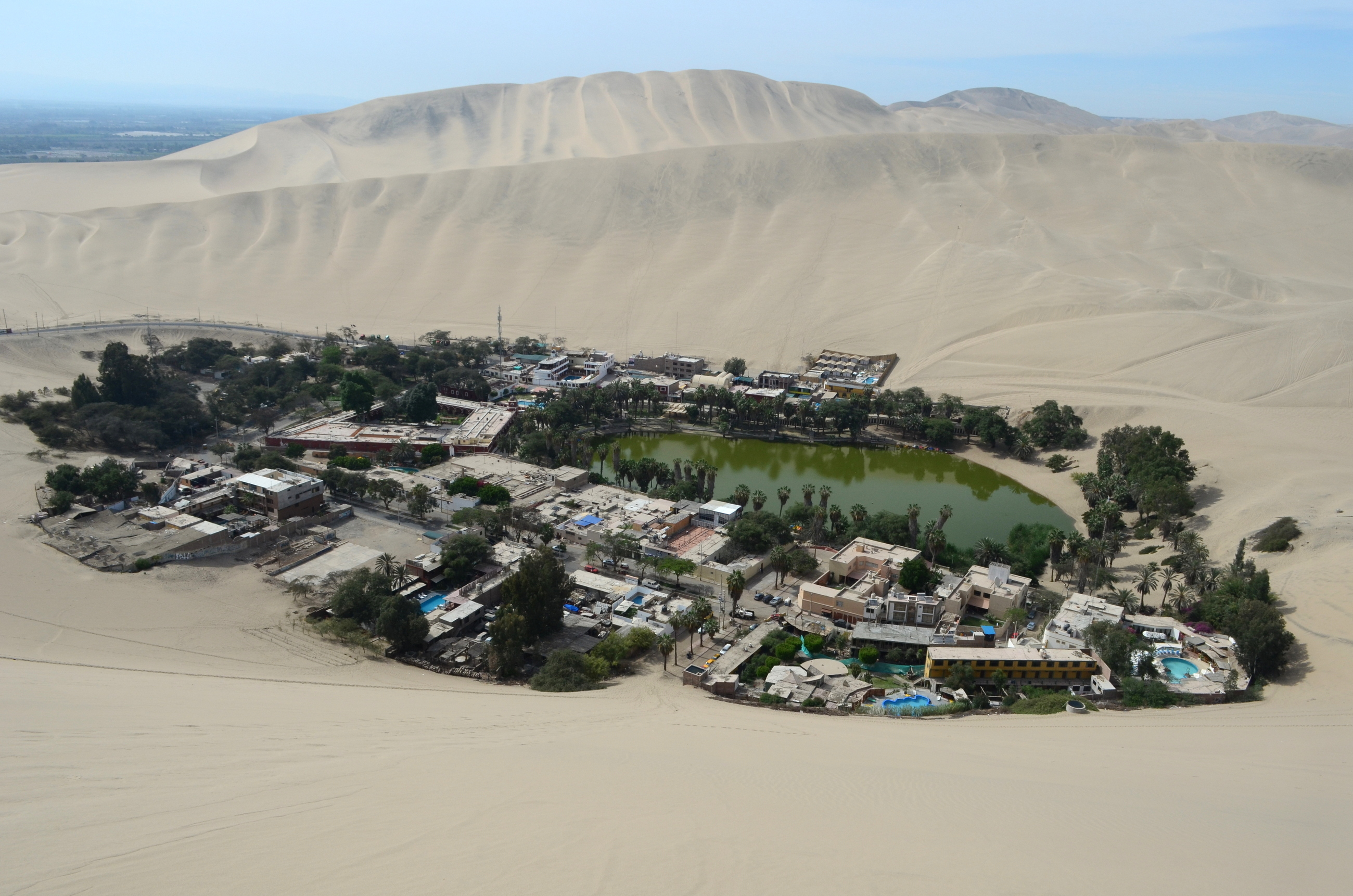
Huacachina oasis and lagoon, surrounded by desert dunes in the Huacachina Lagoon Conservation Area

Regional conservation areas are protected natural areas administered by Peru’s regional governments and established by Supreme Decree at their request. As part of the Natural Protected Areas System, they are created on state lands free of exclusive rights and, under an approved management plan, allow sustainable use of resources, particularly by local communities, in accordance with conservation objectives.

Regional Conservation Areas (ACR)
Name	Location (region)	Established	Area (2026)
Cordillera Escalera Regional Conservation Area	San Martín	22 December 2005	149,870 ha (370,337 acres)
Ventanilla Wetlands Regional Conservation Area	Callao	6 September 2012	275.45 ha (681 acres)
Albúfera del Medio Mundo Regional Conservation Area	Lima	6 June 2013	687.71 ha (1,699 acres)
Tamshiyacu-Tahuayo Communal Regional Conservation Area	Loreto	15 May 2009	420,080.25 ha (1,038,041 acres)
Vilacota Maure Regional Conservation Area	Tacna	27 August 2009	124,313.18 ha (307,185 acres)
Imiria Regional Conservation Area	Ucayali	15 June 2010	135,737.52 ha (335,415 acres)
Choquequirao Regional Conservation Area	Cusco	23 December 2010	103,814.39 ha (256,531 acres)
Puya Raymondi–Titankayocc Forest Regional Conservation Area	Ayacucho	23 December 2010	6,272.39 ha (15,499 acres)
Ampiyacu-Apayacu Regional Conservation Area	Loreto	18 March 2011	434,129.54 ha (1,072,757 acres)
Alto Nanay–Pintuyacu–Chambira Regional Conservation Area	Loreto	18 March 2011	954,635.48 ha (2,358,956 acres)
Angostura Faical Regional Conservation Area	Tumbes	18 March 2011	8,794.50 ha (21,732 acres)
Huacrupe–La Calera Forest Regional Conservation Area	Lambayeque	22 June 2011	7,272.27 ha (17,970 acres)
Moyán–Palacio Forest Regional Conservation Area	Lambayeque	22 June 2011	8,457.76 ha (20,900 acres)
Huaytapallana Regional Conservation Area	Junín	21 July 2011	22,406.52 ha (55,368 acres)
Dry Forests of Salitral–Huarmaca Regional Conservation Area	Piura	21 July 2011	28,811.86 ha (71,196 acres)
Huacachina Lagoon Regional Conservation Area	Ica	6 August 2014	2,407.72 ha (5,950 acres)
Maijuna Kichwa Regional Conservation Area	Loreto	16 June 2015	391,039.82 ha (966,280 acres)
Tres Cañones Regional Conservation Area	Cusco	24 August 2017	39,485.11 ha (97,570 acres)
Vista Alegre–Omia Regional Conservation Area	Amazonas	17 June 2018	48,944.51 ha (120,945 acres)
Seasonally Dry Tropical Forests of the Marañón Regional Conservation Area	Amazonas	17 June 2018	13,929.12 ha (34,420 acres)
Shunté and Mishollo Forest Regional Conservation Area	San Martín	15 December 2018	191,405.53 ha (472,973 acres)
El Chaupe, Cunía y Chinchiquilla Forest Regional Conservation Area	Cajamarca	1 October 2019	21,868.88 ha (54,039 acres)
Lomas de Lima System Regional Conservation Area	Lima	7 December 2019	13,475.74 ha (33,299 acres)
Ausangate Regional Conservation Area	Cusco	12 December 2019	66,514.17 ha (164,360 acres)
Carpish Montane Forest Regional Conservation Area	Huánuco	1 January 2020	50,559.21 ha (124,935 acres)
Chuyapi Urusayhua Regional Conservation Area	Cusco	25 March 2021	80,190.78 ha (198,156 acres)
High Andean Forests and Páramos of Jaén and Tabaconas Regional Conservation Area	Cajamarca	6 May 2021	31,537.23 ha (77,930 acres)
Marañón Dry Forests Regional Conservation Area	Cajamarca	13 May 2021	21,794.71 ha (53,856 acres)
Pozuzo Bend Regional Conservation Area	Huánuco	24 July 2021	10,543.95 ha (26,055 acres)
Q’eros-Kosñipata Regional Conservation Area	Cusco	24 July 2021	55,319.07 ha (136,696 acres)
Alto Tamaya–Abujao Communal Regional Conservation Area	Ucayali	24 July 2021	150,010.82 ha (370,685 acres)
Amaru–Huachocolpa–Chihuana Cloud Forest Regional Conservation Area	Huancavelica	6 November 2021	5,024.18 ha (12,415 acres)
Inter-Andean Dry Forests of Cutervo Regional Conservation Area	Cajamarca	17 May 2025	18,410.94 ha (45,494 acres)
Putumayo–Algodón Regional Conservation Area	Loreto	6 June 2025	283,594.76 ha (700,778 acres)
Velo de la Novia Regional Conservation Area	Ucayali	20 June 2025	14,399.96 ha (35,583 acres)
San Pedro de Chonta Regional Conservation Area	Huánuco	12 August 2025	51,888.92 ha (128,220 acres)
Huamantanga and Chorro Blanco Montane Forests Regional Conservation Area	Cajamarca	14 March 2026	14,022.65 ha (34,651 acres)
Aguas Calientes Maquia Conservation Area	Loreto	11 June 2026	98,161.84 ha (242,563 acres)
Chontabamba Huancabamba Regional Conservation Area	Pasco	11 June 2026	13,734.05 ha (33,938 acres)

== Private conservation areas ==
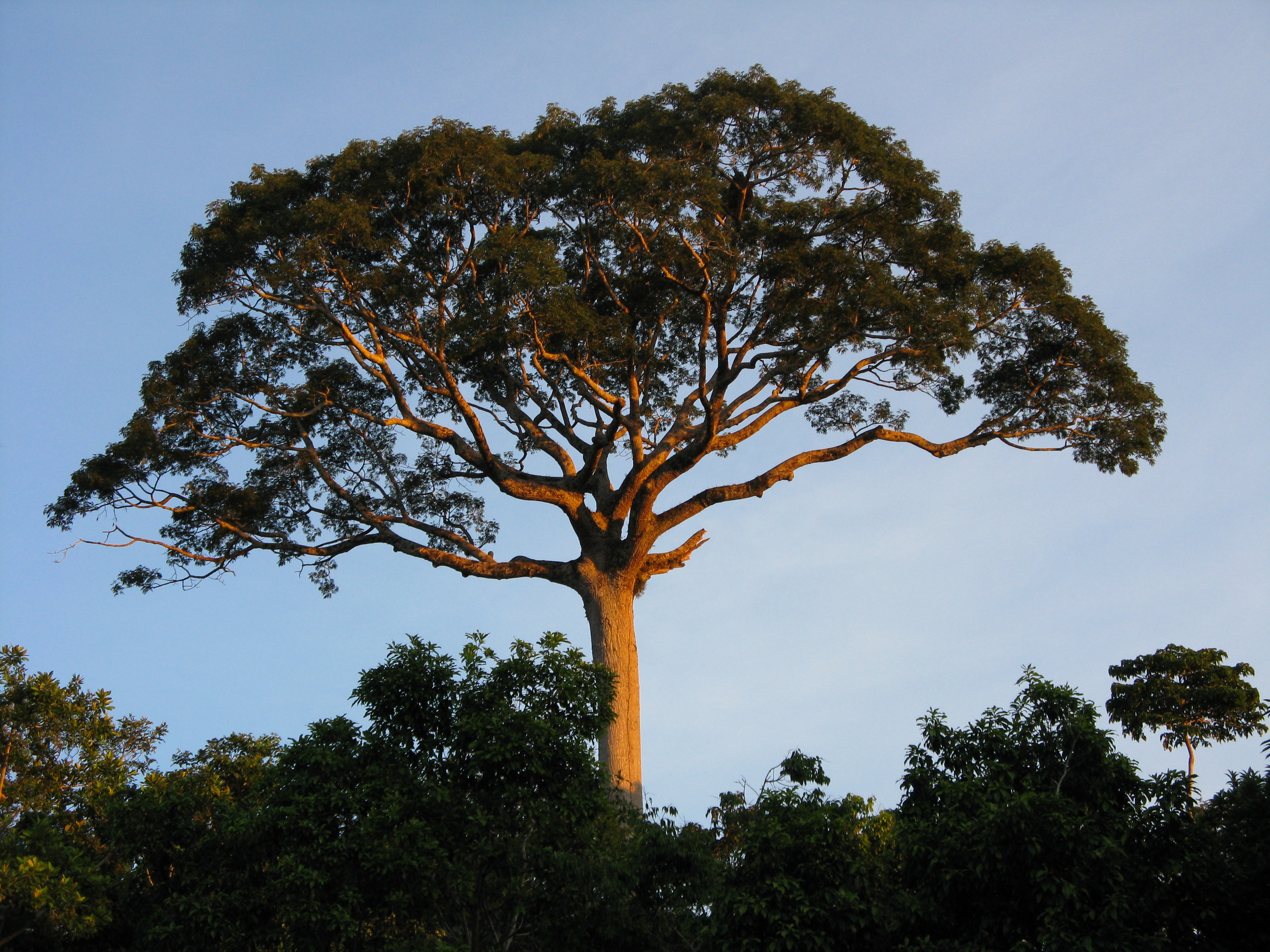
Kapok tree (Ceiba pentandra) in the Panguana Conservation Area

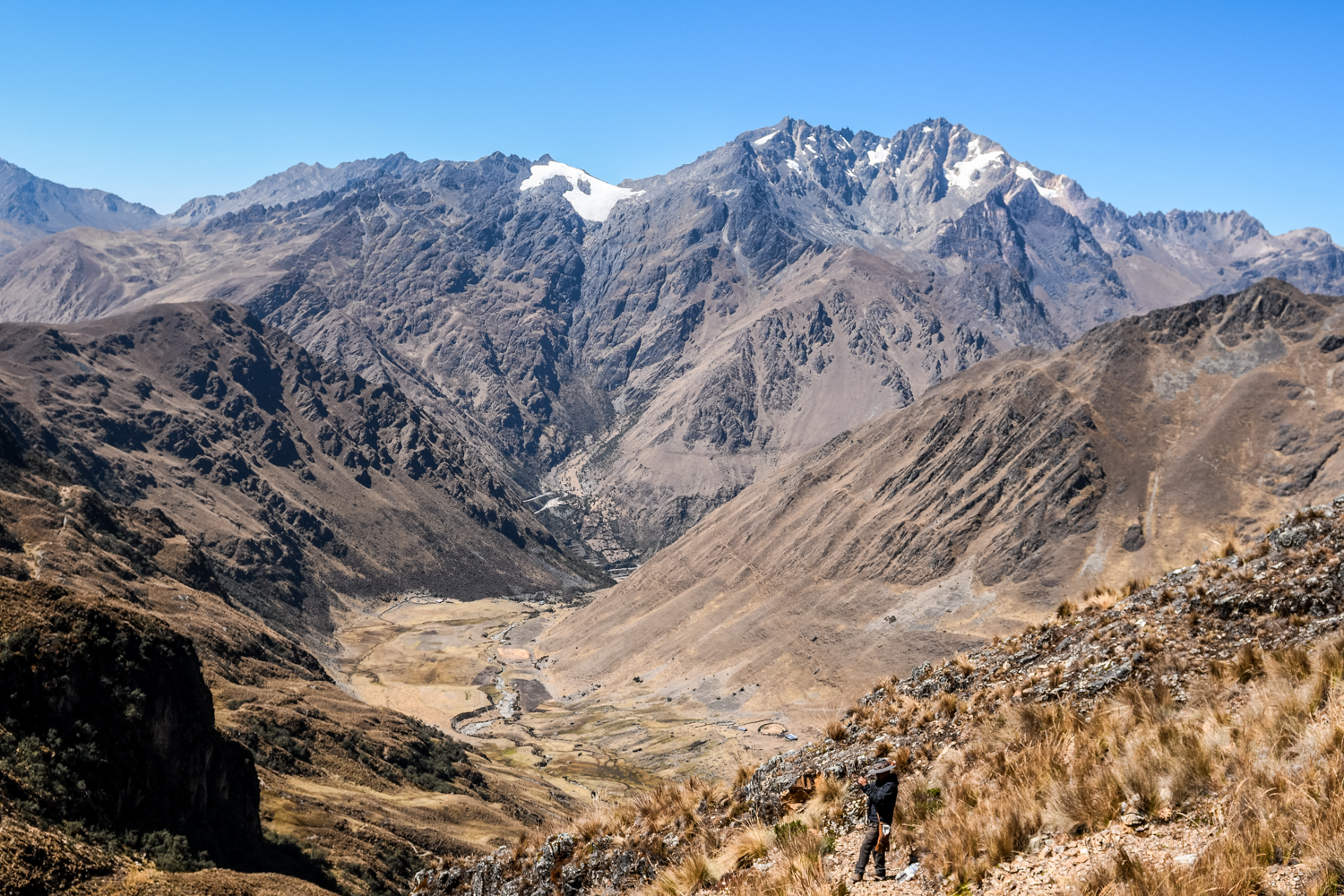
View from the Abra Málaga Thastayoc Royal Cinclodes Conservation Area, with Veronica mountain in the background

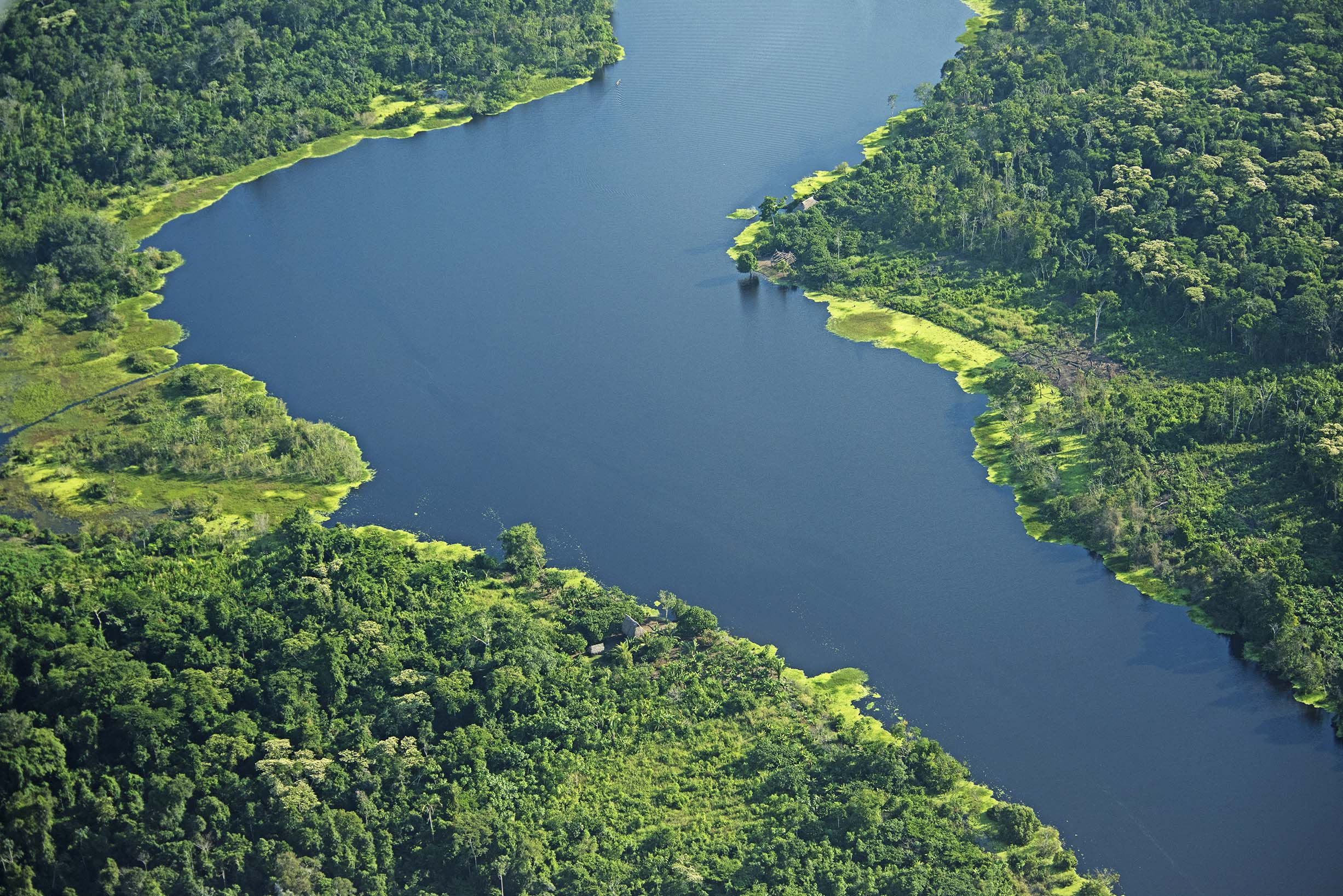
Aerial view of dense Amazonian forest within the Campo Verde Conservation Area

Private conservation areas are voluntary commitments by individual or collective landowners, such as titled native communities or private entities, to dedicate part or all of their property to biodiversity conservation. Recognized by ministerial resolution of the Ministry of the Environment, private conservation areas bolster the System’s coverage by protecting sites of high ecological or scenic value, supporting ecosystem services, scientific research, environmental education and specialized tourism under a long-term conservation framework.

Private Conservation Areas (ACP)
Name	Location (region)	Established	Area (2025)
Chaparri	Lambayeque and Cajamarca	19 December 2001	34,412 ha (85,034 acres)
Bosque Natural El Cañoncillo	La Libertad	16 September 2004	1,310.90 ha (3,239 acres)
Pacllón	Áncash	13 December 2005	12,896.56 ha (31,868 acres)
Huayllapa	Lima	13 December 2005	21,106.57 ha (52,155 acres)
Huiquilla	Amazonas	30 November 2006	1,140.54 ha (2,818 acres)
San Antonio	Amazonas	9 March 2007	357.39 ha (883 acres)
Jirishanca	Huánuco	24 April 2007	12,172.91 ha (30,080 acres)
Abra Patricia – Alto Nieva	Amazonas	16 October 2007	1,415.74 ha (3,498 acres)
Abra Málaga Thastayoc – Royal Cinclodes	Cusco	16 January 2009	70.64 ha (175 acres)
Hatun Queuña – Quishuarani Ccollana	Cusco	16 January 2009	234.88 ha (580 acres)
Tambo Ilusión	San Martín	6 May 2010	14.29 ha (35 acres)
Tilacancha	Amazonas	6 July 2010	6,800.48 ha (16,804 acres)
Refugio K'erenda Homet	Madre de Dios	6 September 2010	35.40 ha (87 acres)
Bosque Seco Amotape	Tumbes	1 December 2010	123.30 ha (305 acres)
Hierba Buena – Allpayacu	Amazonas	7 June 2011	2,282.12 ha (5,639 acres)
San Marcos	Huánuco	16 June 2011	985.99 ha (2,436 acres)
Copallín	Amazonas	24 June 2011	11,549.21 ha (28,539 acres)
Lomas de Atiquipa	Arequipa	26 July 2011	19,028.02 ha (47,019 acres)
Huaylla Belén – Colcamar	Amazonas	26 July 2011	6,338.42 ha (15,663 acres)
La Huerta del Chaparrí	Lambayeque	11 November 2011	100 ha (247 acres)
Pillco Grande – Bosque de Pumataki	Cusco	22 December 2011	271.62 ha (671 acres)
Panguana	Huánuco	22 December 2011	135.60 ha (335 acres)
Japu – Bosque Ukumari Llaqta	Cusco	22 December 2011	18,695.75 ha (46,198 acres)
Checca	Puno	11 June 2012	560 ha (1,384 acres)
Bosque de Palmeras de la Comunidad Campesina Taulia Molinopampa	Amazonas	20 September 2012	10,920.84 ha (26,986 acres)
Gotas de Agua II	Cajamarca	28 September 2012	7.50 ha (19 acres)
Los Chilchos	Amazonas	21 November 2012	46,000 ha (113,668 acres)
Camino Verde Baltimore	Madre de Dios	28 December 2012	21.07 ha (52 acres)
Larga Vista I	San Martín	21 January 2013	22.32 ha (55 acres)
Pucunucho	San Martín	15 February 2013	23.50 ha (58 acres)
Bosque Berlín	Amazonas	4 March 2013	59 ha (146 acres)
Bosques de Neblina y Páramos de Samanga	Piura	18 April 2013	2,888.03 ha (7,136 acres)
Selva Virgen	Loreto	11 July 2013	24.51 ha (61 acres)
La Pampa del Burro	Amazonas	16 July 2013	2,776.96 ha (6,862 acres)
Las Panguanas 3	Loreto	9 December 2013	6.87 ha (17 acres)
Las Panguanas 4	Loreto	9 December 2013	5.12 ha (13 acres)
Las Panguanas 2	Loreto	27 December 2013	0.62 ha (2 acres)
Paraíso Natural Iwirati	Loreto	14 January 2014	100 ha (247 acres)
Amazon Shelter	Madre de Dios	14 April 2014	9.59 ha (24 acres)
Espíritu del Monte	Madre de Dios	26 May 2014	40 ha (99 acres)
Las Panguanas 1	Loreto	23 June 2014	1.91 ha (5 acres)
Kakiri Uka	Loreto	25 July 2014	12.14 ha (30 acres)
Cavernas de Leo	Amazonas	15 September 2014	12.50 ha (31 acres)
Lagunas y Páramos de Andinos de San José de Tapal	Piura	31 March 2015	908 ha (2,244 acres)
Llamapampa – La Jalca	Amazonas	17 April 2015	26,216.10 ha (64,781 acres)
Wacan Numi	Loreto	24 April 2015	12.80 ha (32 acres)
Bosque de Nogal y Bosque de Puentecilla	Piura	26 May 2015	449.26 ha (1,110 acres)
Bosques de Cuyas Cuchayo	Piura	8 June 2015	102.65 ha (254 acres)
Ronsoco Cocha	San Martín	8 June 2015	363.683 ha (899 acres)
Siete Cataratas – Qanchis Paccha	Cusco	21 August 2015	1,008.51 ha (2,492 acres)
San Luis	Cusco	1 December 2015	1,144 ha (2,827 acres)
El Cortijo	Loreto	30 December 2015	22.35 ha (55 acres)
San Pedro de Chuquibamba	Amazonas	30 December 2015	19,560 ha (48,334 acres)
Botafogo	Madre de Dios	22 January 2016	16.8744 ha (42 acres)
Aurora	Loreto	9 February 2016	38.9617 ha (96 acres)
Mangamanguilla de la Asociación Agraria Manga Manga de Salitral	Piura	2 March 2016	1,738.23 ha (4,295 acres)
Los Bosques de Dotor, Hualtacal, Pueblo Libre, La Jardina y Chorro Blanco	Piura	4 April 2016	9,944.73 ha (24,574 acres)
Bosque Seco de la Comunidad Campesina Cesar Vallejo de Palo Blanco	Piura	27 April 2016	200 ha (494 acres)
Bosques Montanos y Páramos Chicuate – Chinguelas	Piura	4 June 2016	27,107.45 ha (66,984 acres)
Palmonte	San Martín	21 June 2016	14.3082 ha (35 acres)
Sabalillo	Loreto	21 June 2016	22.6864 ha (56 acres)
Santuario de La Verónica	Cusco	8 July 2016	20.7930 ha (51 acres)
Fundo Rosita	Loreto	13 July 2016	244.9250 ha (605 acres)
Machusaniaca II	Cusco	21 July 2016	12.9836 ha (32 acres)
Lomas del Cerro Campana	La Libertad	26 July 2016	4,564.98 ha (11,280 acres)
Machusaniaca I	Cusco	26 July 2016	22.0048 ha (54 acres)
Bosques Montanos y Páramos de Huaricancha	Piura	26 July 2016	5,915.35 ha (14,617 acres)
Yacila de Zamba	Piura	26 July 2016	1,000 ha (2,471 acres)
Bosque Seco de Chililique Alto	Piura	26 July 2016	200 ha (494 acres)
Bosque de Neblina Aypate – Olleros	Piura	27 July 2016	243.50 ha (602 acres)
Fundo Cadena	Cusco	27 July 2016	44.7374 ha (111 acres)
Los Bosques de Overal y Palo Blanco	Piura	27 July 2016	3,522.32 ha (8,704 acres)
Ebio Kiabamene	Madre de Dios	27 July 2016	1,924.6752 ha (4,756 acres)
Tambopata Eco Lodge	Madre de Dios	20 October 2016	1,065.7047 ha (2,633 acres)
Fundo Las Neblinas	Pasco	20 October 2016	30.3620 ha (75 acres)
Sumac Quilla	Loreto	2 November 2016	36.2200 ha (90 acres)
Lakshmi Amazónica	Loreto	2 November 2016	56.660564 ha (140 acres)
Sumac Pacha	Loreto	2 November 2016	30 ha (74 acres)
Sumac Inti	Loreto	8 November 2016	27.20 ha (67 acres)
Wayqecha	Cusco	22 November 2016	593.8534 ha (1,467 acres)
Chakra Educativa	Loreto	9 December 2016	9.33675 ha (23 acres)
Bahuaja 1	Madre de Dios	5 January 2017	132.0384 ha (326 acres)
Bosque Seco de Colina Juan Velasco Alvarado	Piura	15 February 2017	2,412.45 ha (5,961 acres)
Santa Catalina de Moza	Piura	15 February 2017	1,842.04 ha (4,552 acres)
Zaragoza	Pasco	12 May 2017	72.0491 ha (178 acres)
Matoriato	Cusco	12 May 2017	1,737.50 ha (4,293 acres)
Páramos y Bosques Montanos de la Comunidad Campesina San Juan de Sallique	Cajamarca	23 August 2017	3,547.19 ha (8,765 acres)
Zoo Perú	Loreto	15 September 2017	80.6250 ha (199 acres)
Bosque Seco San Juan de los Guayaquiles	Piura	15 September 2017	304.84 ha (753 acres)
Bosque de Churumazú	Pasco	2 November 2017	14.0798 ha (35 acres)
Darshan Ashram	Loreto	7 November 2017	23.3980 ha (58 acres)
Las Naranjas	San Martín	18 April 2018	30 ha (74 acres)
Bioparque Amazónico: Bosque de Huayo	Loreto	24 July 2018	10.758995 ha (27 acres)
Comunal Cujillo	Cajamarca	24 August 2018	3,740.28 ha (9,242 acres)
Refugio Lupuna	Madre de Dios	24 October 2018	41.9469 ha (104 acres)
El Cortijo Centro Piedras	Madre de Dios	11 December 2018	68.7276 ha (170 acres)
Páramos y Bosques Montanos San Miguel de Tabaconas	Cajamarca	11 December 2018	17,555.95 ha (43,382 acres)
Naturaleza Viva Ryo	Madre de Dios	16 December 2018	26.30 ha (65 acres)
Masheke	Madre de Dios	7 February 2019	366.43 ha (905 acres)
Páramos y Bosques Montanos, Paraíso de la Comunidad Campesina San Felipe	Cajamarca	12 February 2019	1,957.75 ha (4,838 acres)
Knoya – Supru	Madre de Dios	15 February 2019	2,550.08 ha (6,301 acres)
Comunal San Pablo–Catarata Gocta	Amazonas	29 April 2019	2,603.5732 ha (6,434 acres)
Arroyo Negro	Amazonas	1 May 2019	156.42 ha (387 acres)
Hakim & Cumorah	Loreto	5 May 2019	61.7309 ha (153 acres)
Comunidad Nativa Tibi Playa I Zona Río Ucayali	Loreto	11 November 2019	1,122.4700 ha (2,774 acres)
Zoo Perú 1	Loreto	2 December 2019	80.6250 ha (199 acres)
Kuntur Wachana	Cusco	16 January 2020	1,289.13 ha (3,186 acres)
Pumahuasi	Cusco	16 January 2020	861.01 ha (2,128 acres)
Fundo San Isidro El Labrador	Loreto	20 January 2020	23.3570 ha (58 acres)
Buen Retiro	Loreto	3 February 2020	67.4310 ha (167 acres)
Bosque Cachil	Cajamarca	7 February 2020	210.40 ha (520 acres)
La Niebla Forest	Junín	26 February 2020	70.28 ha (174 acres)
Comunidad Nativa San Jorge del Río Marañón	Loreto	23 August 2020	1,060.86 ha (2,621 acres)
Unchog	Huánuco	23 November 2020	885.28 ha (2,188 acres)
Bosque Urum	Lambayeque	18 February 2021	705.9514 ha (1,744 acres)
Potsom Posho´II	Pasco	31 March 2021	20.30 ha (50 acres)
Lomas de Quebrada Río Seco	Lima	9 July 2021	787.82 ha (1,947 acres)
Ni Meraya	Loreto	22 September 2021	13.18 ha (33 acres)
Paraje Capiro Llaylla	Junín	25 September 2021	350.180975 ha (865 acres)
Comunidad Nativa Once de Agosto Río Ucayali	Loreto	30 September 2021	1,100.017096 ha (2,718 acres)
San Lorenzo	Amazonas	17 October 2021	191.14 ha (472 acres)
Nihii Eupa Francisco	Madre de Dios	31 December 2021	2,103.75 ha (5,198 acres)
Predio Collpapampa (Huadquiña-Mesada Chico)	Cusco	31 December 2021	43 ha (106 acres)
Los Amigos	Madre de Dios	31 December 2021	140.3457 ha (347 acres)
Misquiyaco	Cusco	31 December 2021	1,797.91 ha (4,443 acres)
Tambopata Eco Lodge I	Madre de Dios	31 December 2021	184.8147 ha (457 acres)
Juningue	San Martín	29 January 2022	65.56 ha (162 acres)
El Bosque Encantado de Sho'llet	Pasco	29 May 2022	20.8773 ha (52 acres)
Suttoc y Pacchac	Cusco	24 June 2022	1,808.75 ha (4,470 acres)
Fundo Miguel I	Ucayali	13 August 2022	6.6641 ha (16 acres)
Campo Verde	Ucayali	29 September 2022	8,049.872 ha (19,892 acres)
Pablito II	Ucayali	18 October 2022	12.5246 ha (31 acres)
Yasgolca–Santa Lucia, Montevideo	Amazonas	22 February 2023	4,725.69 ha (11,677 acres)
Pampacorral	Cusco	22 February 2023	767.56 ha (1,897 acres)
Utco	Cajamarca	22 February 2023	3,060.36 ha (7,562 acres)
San Juan Bautista	Madre de Dios	6 September 2023	72.2044 ha (178 acres)
Totorabamba	Ayacucho	25 October 2023	412.49 ha (1,019 acres)
Huella Verde	Loreto	22 June 2024	9.83422 ha (24 acres)
Bosque Nublado Miraflores	Pasco	27 September 2024	5.70 ha (14 acres)
Don Aarón	Madre de Dios	8 February 2025	169.0756 ha (418 acres)
Comunidad Nativa Nueva Unión	Loreto	27 February 2025	1,352.092039 ha (3,341 acres)
Don Abraham	Madre de Dios	13 June 2025	473.601700 ha (1,170 acres)
Lluvias Eternas	Pasco	28 June 2025	13.8029 ha (34 acres)
Comunidad Nativa Nueva York	Loreto	2 July 2025	3,421.0196 ha (8,454 acres)
Ausangate	Cusco	6 August 2025	12,847.17 ha (31,746 acres)
Palmas del Shanusi II	Loreto	3 October 2025	988.210889 ha (2,442 acres)
Llollo	Pasco	28 June 2026	60.0445 ha (148 acres)
Nueva Vida	Junín	14 August 2026	5.9627 ha (15 acres)
Zoo Perú II	Loreto	9 September 2026	40.3125 ha (100 acres)

== See also ==
- Wildlife of Peru
- List of UNESCO Biosphere Reserves in Peru
- List of World Heritage Sites in Peru
- Tourism in Peru
