= Ancón Reserved Zone =

Protected area in Peru

- Zona Reservada de Ancón
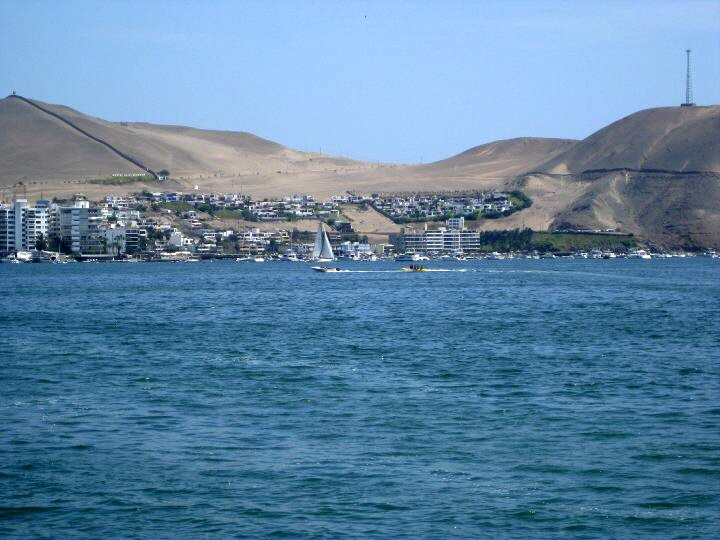

- Location within Peru
- Location: Lima Province, Lima Region, Peru
- Nearest city: Ancón District, Puente Piedra District
- Coordinates: 11°44′54″S 77°11′08″W
- Area: 21.93 km^{2} (8.47 sq mi)
- Designation: Reserved Zone
- Established: May 10, 2013
- Governing body: SERNANP
- Website: www.sernanp.gob.pe

The Ancón Reserved Zone (Spanish: Zona Reservada de Ancón) is a protected area located in the Lima Province of the Lima Region, Peru. It was established on May 10, 2013, by Ministerial Resolution No. 140-2013-MINAM and covers an area of approximately 2,193.01 ha (5,419.0 acres).

The zone includes coastal desert and marine ecosystems in the Bay of Ancón, located within the districts of Ancón and Puente Piedra. It holds great potential for scientific research and education due to the unique biotic components of the coastal desert and marine habitats, which show special ecological adaptations. The area also plays a role in fostering the value of conservation of Peru's coastal natural resources.

== See also ==
- Protected areas of Peru
- List of marine protected areas of Peru
