= Tuntanain Communal Reserve =

- Interactive map of Tuntanain Communal Reserve
- Location: Amazonas Region, Peru
- Coordinates: 4.11°S 78.06°W
- Area: 949.67 km^{2} (366.67 sq mi)
- Established: August 10, 2007

The Tuntanain Communal Reserve (Spanish: Reserva Comunal Tuntanain) is a protected area in Peru located in the Amazonas Region. It was created in August 2007 by decree of President Alan García. In 2006, PerúPetro granted Hocol, a French oil concern, the right to drill in territories now partially coextensive with the Reserve.

== See also ==
- Natural and Cultural Peruvian Heritage
