= Cordillera Huayhuash Reserved Zone =

Protected area in the Cordillera Huayhuash mountain range in Peru

- Zona Reservada Cordillera Huayhuash
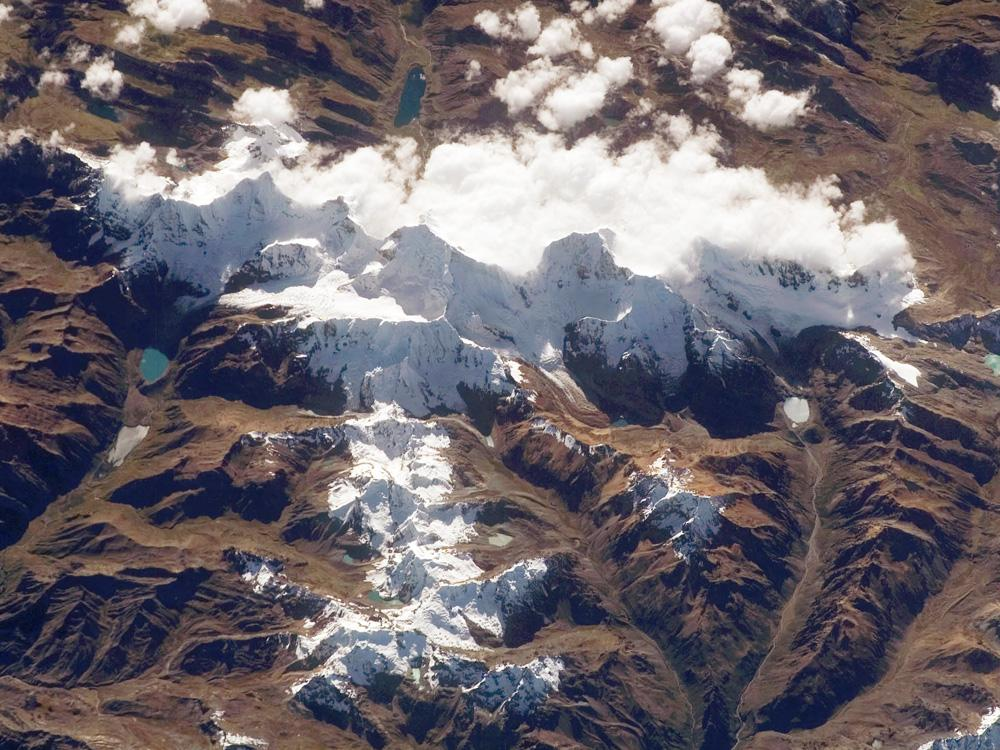
- Cordillera Huayhuash seen from space

- Location within Peru
- Location: Peru; Ancash Region; Huánuco Region; Lima Region
- Coordinates: 10°22′32″S 76°51′24″W
- Area: 67,589.76 ha (167,017.9 acres)
- Established: 20 December 2002
- Governing body: SERNANP
- Website: Cordillera Huayhuash Reserved Zone

The Cordillera Huayhuash Reserved Zone (Spanish: Zona Reservada Cordillera Huayhuash) is a protected area in Peru located in the departments of Ancash, Huánuco, and Lima. It was established on 20 December 2002 by Ministerial Resolution No. 1173-2002-AG and covers an area of approximately 67,589.76 hectares (167,017.9 acres).

== Geography ==
The Cordillera Huayhuash Reserved Zone encompasses a section of the Cordillera Huayhuash mountain range in the central Andes of Peru. The area contains 21 snow-capped peaks, the highest of which is Yerupajá, at an elevation of 6,634 m (21,765 ft), making it the second-highest mountain in Peru.

The zone gives rise to tributary rivers on both the Pacific and Atlantic slopes: such as the Pativilca River and the Huaura River to the west, and tributaries of the Marañón River to the east. The area's glaciers feed 46 high-altitude glacial lakes.

== Conservation ==
The Cordillera Huayhuash Reserved Zone was established to protect the region’s rich biodiversity, landscapes, and water resources. Surrounding the zone are four Private Conservation Areas: Huayllapa, Jirishanca, Llamac, and Pacllón.

== See also ==
- Cordillera Huayhuash
- List of protected areas of Peru
