= Bosque de Zárate Reserved Zone =

Protected area in Peru

- Zona Reservada Bosque de Zárate
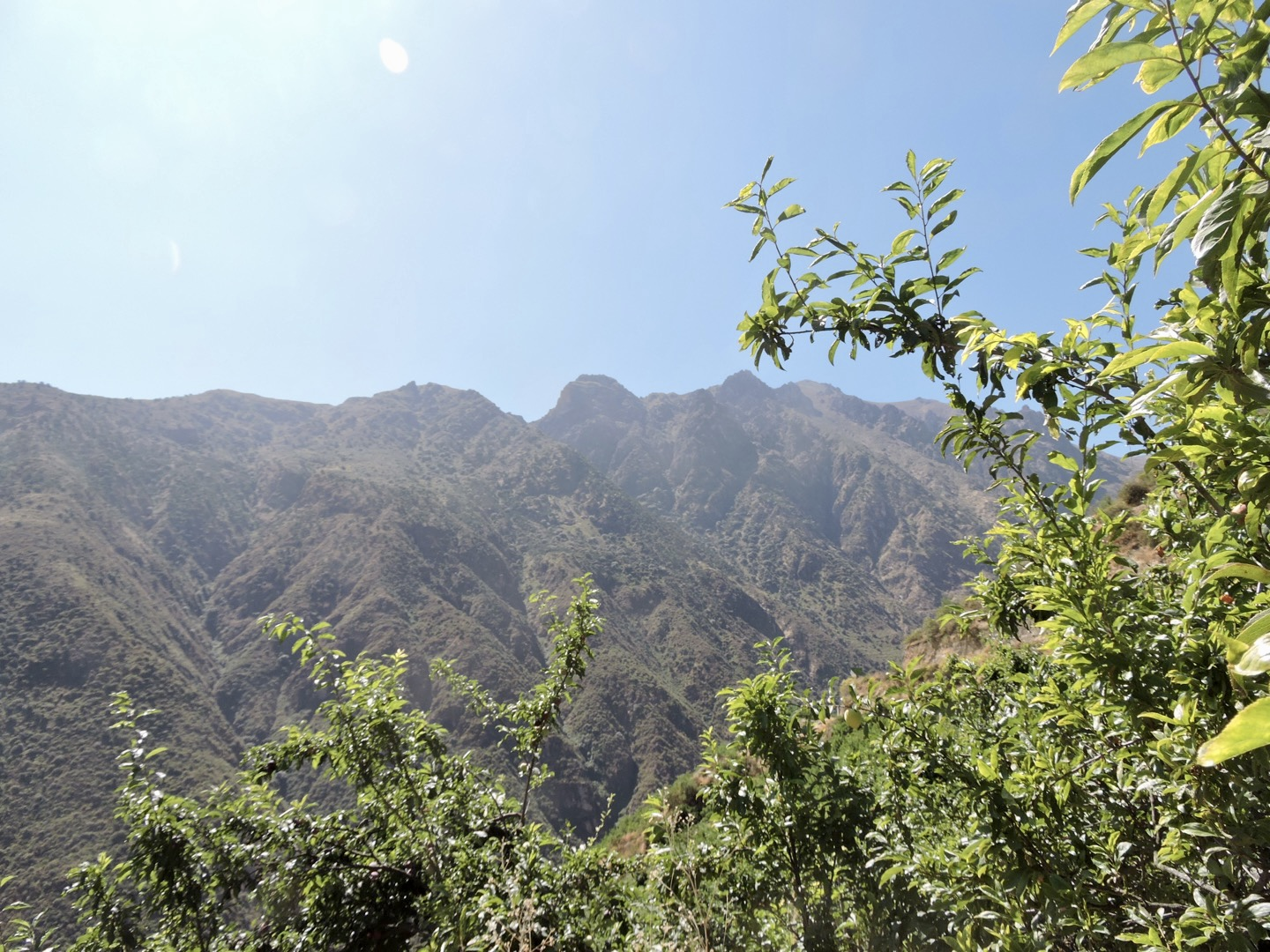

- Location within Peru
- Location: Huarochirí Province, Lima Region, Peru
- Nearest city: San Bartolomé
- Coordinates: 11°55′45″S 76°29′21″W
- Area: 5.46 km^{2} (2.11 sq mi)
- Designation: Reserved Zone
- Established: October 13, 2010
- Governing body: SERNANP
- Website: www.sernanp.gob.pe

The Bosque de Zárate Reserved Zone (Spanish: Zona Reservada Bosque de Zárate) is a protected area in Peru. It is located in the Huarochirí Province of the Lima Region. The area was designated as a reserved zone on October 13, 2010, by Ministerial Resolution No. 195-2010-MINAM. It covers an area of approximately 545.75 ha (1,348.6 acres).

== Biodiversity ==
The zone is situated in the upper part of the San Bartolomé River gorge and features a dry mist forest dominated by species such as Oreopanax, Myrcianthes, and Escallonia, along with various shrubs. The area hosts at least 63 bird species, including the endemic Zaratornis stresemanni, Poospiza rubecula, Leptasthenura pileata, Asthenes pudibunda, and Atlapetes nationi. The Peruvian orchid species Chloraea undulata is also found here. In addition to its ecological value, the forest provides important protection against landslides for local settlements, particularly the town of San Bartolomé, during the summer rainy season.

== See also ==
- Protected areas of Peru
