= Cerro Khapia Reserved Zone =

Protected area in Peru

- Reserva Paisajística Cerro Khapia
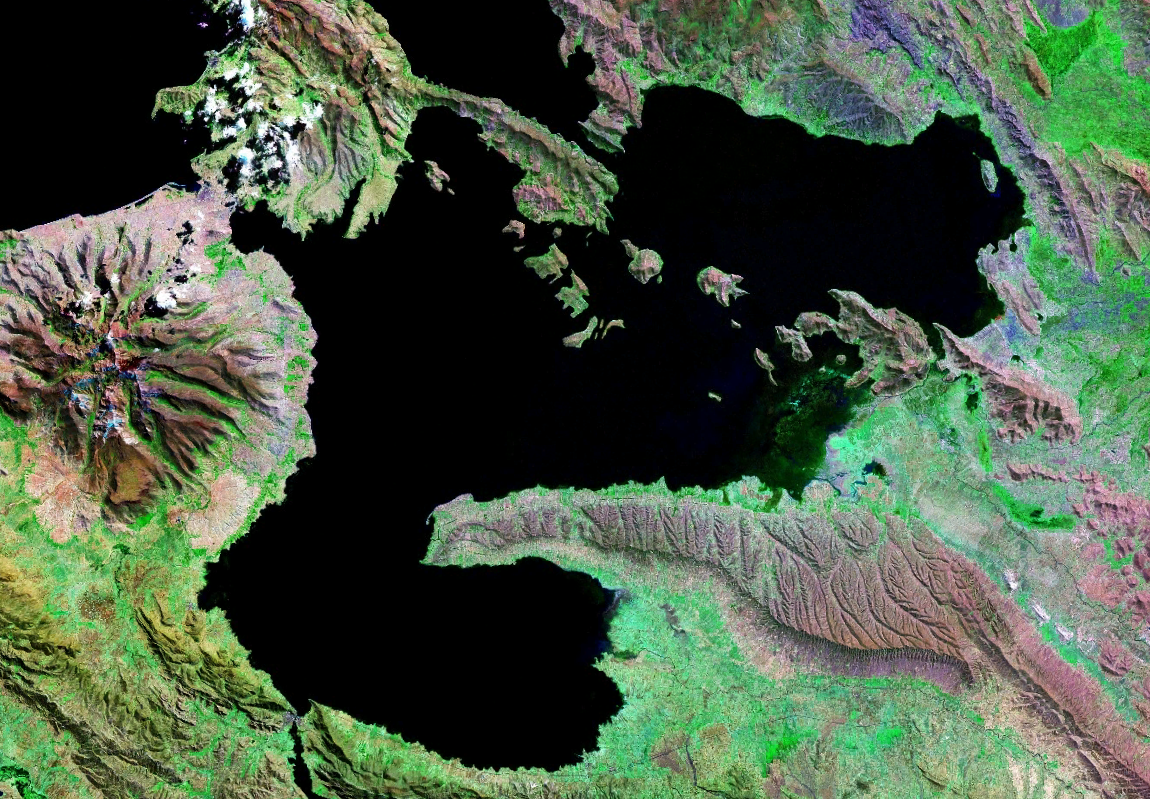

- Location within Peru
- Location: Yunguyo Province and Chucuito Province, Puno Region, Peru
- Coordinates: 16°22′34″S 69°07′25″W
- Area: 183.14 km^{2} (70.71 sq mi)
- Established: May 28, 2011
- Governing body: SERNANP
- Website: www.sernanp.gob.pe

The Cerro Khapia Reserved Zone (Spanish: Reserva Paisajística Cerro Khapia) is a protected area in Peru, established on May 28, 2011. It was created to preserve the biological, cultural, landscape, and ecosystem diversity of Cerro Khapia.

The reserved zone acknowledges the land ownership rights of local peasant communities and respects their traditional cultural, religious, spiritual, and agricultural practices.

== See also ==
- Cerro Khapia
- Protected areas of Peru
