= Dorsal de Nasca National Reserve =

Protected area of Peru

- IUCN category VI (protected area with sustainable use of natural resources)
- Location within Peru
- Location: Pacific Ocean, offshore from the Ica Region, Peru
- Coordinates: 16°13′50″S 77°26′14″W
- Area: 62,392.06 km^{2} (24,089.71 sq mi)
- Established: June 5, 2021
- Governing body: SERNANP
- Website: www.sernanp.gob.pe

The Dorsal de Nasca National Reserve (Spanish: Reserva Nacional Dorsal de Nasca) is a protected area in Peru, officially designated on June 5, 2021, by Supreme Decree No. 008-2021-MINAM. Covering an area of 62,392 square kilometers, it is the largest protected area in the country.

== Location ==
The reserve is located approximately 105 kilometers off the coast of Peru, opposite the Ica Region. It encompasses deep-sea areas reaching depths of more than 3,000 meters and spans a surface of 62,392.06 km².

== Marine biodiversity ==
Within the reserve, 32 commercially significant marine species have been identified. These include bluefin tuna (Thunnus thynnus), bonito (Sarda spp.), mackerel (Scomber scombrus), jack mackerel (Trachurus murphyi), swordfish (Xiphias gladius), and blue shark (Prionace glauca).

The surface waters of the reserve are also frequented by migratory species such as Salvin's albatross (Thalassarche salvini) and the loggerhead sea turtle (Caretta caretta).

== See also ==
- List of marine protected areas of Peru
