= Puquio Santa Rosa Protection Forest =

Protected area in Peru

- Bosque de Protección Puquio Santa Rosa
- IUCN category VI (protected area with sustainable use of natural resources)
- Location within Peru
- Location: Peru; La Libertad
- Coordinates: 8°35′30″S 78°43′10″W
- Area: 0.280 sq mi (0.73 km^{2})
- Established: September 2, 1982
- Governing body: SERNANP
- Website: Bosque de Protección Puquio Santa Rosa

Puquio Santa Rosa Protection Forest is a protected area in La Libertad, Peru, established on 31 January 1985. It covers an extension of 72.5 hectares (0.280 mi^{2}).
