= Mar Tropical de Grau National Reserve =

Protected marine area of Peru

- IUCN category VI (protected area with sustainable use of natural resources)
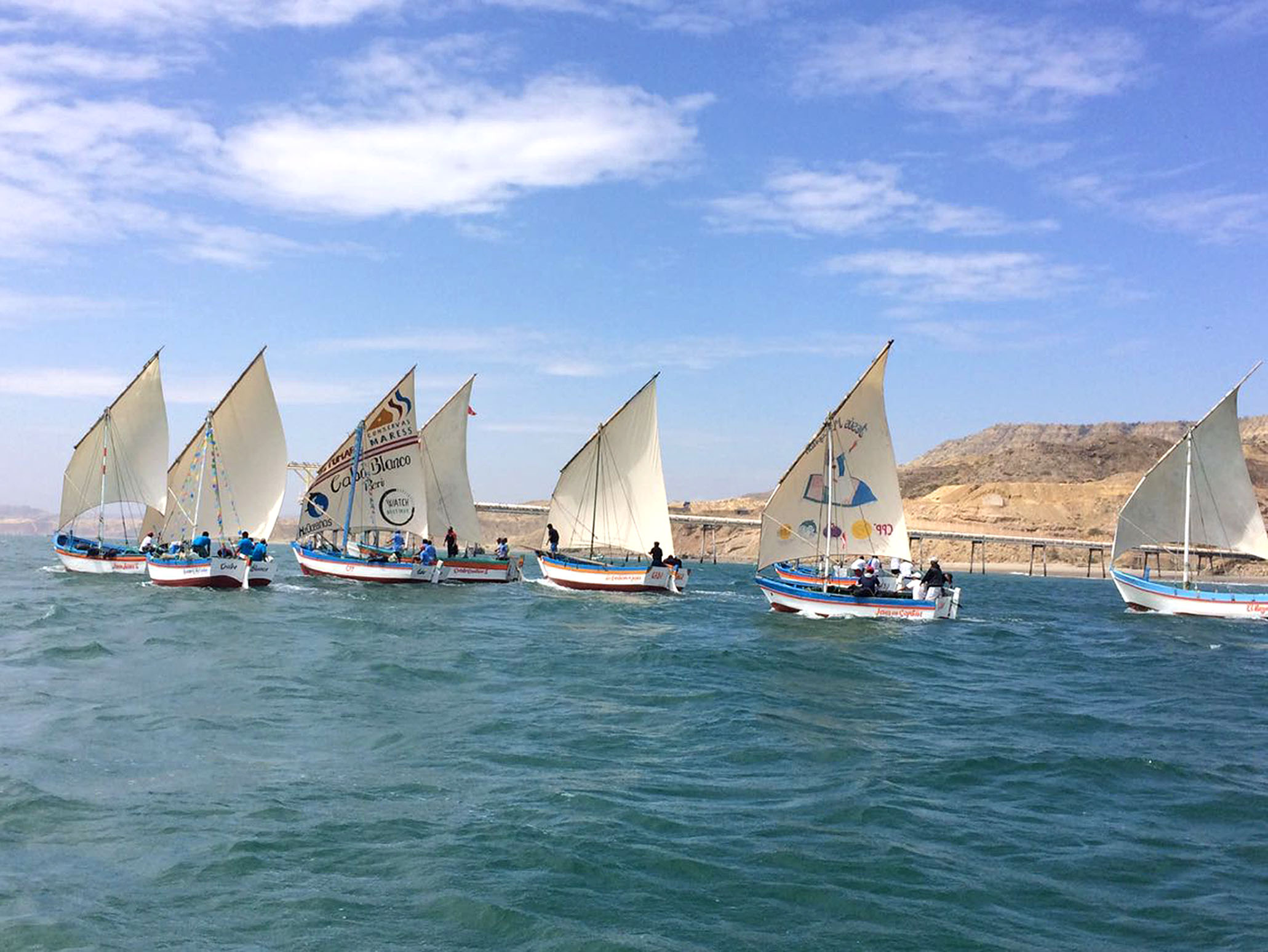

- Location within Peru
- Location: Piura Region and Tumbes Region, Peru
- Coordinates: 5°12′35″S 81°12′21″W
- Area: 115,675.89 ha (285,841.3 acres)
- Established: April 26, 2024
- Governing body: SERNANP

The Mar Tropical de Grau National Reserve (Spanish: Reserva Nacional Mar Tropical de Grau) is a protected marine area in Peru, located off the coasts of the Piura Region and Tumbes Region.

The reserve was officially established on 26 April 2024 by Supreme Decree No. 003-2024-MINAM, following a decade-long planning and consultation process. It had been approved earlier by the Council of Ministers on 25 April 2024.

The reserve covers an area of approximately 1,156.7589 km^{2} (446.6271 sq mi), which is about 1.5% of Peru’s tropical ocean and 0.14% of its total marine territory. It is divided into four key sectors: Isla Foca, Cabo Blanco–El Ñuro, Punta Sal Reefs, and the Máncora Bank. These areas encompass a variety of marine and insular ecosystems. Isla Foca features a representative insular ecosystem of the Guayaquil ecoregion. Cabo Blanco–El Ñuro includes shallow rocky reefs where cold and warm ocean currents converge. Punta Sal contains rocky reefs in warm waters, while the Máncora Bank is characterized by ecosystems associated with underwater mountains.

The reserve lies at the intersection of the Humboldt Current and the warm El Niño Current, resulting in a highly diverse marine environment. Over 70% of Peru’s marine species are found in this area, including bony fish, sea turtles, whales, dolphins, whale sharks, and giant manta rays.

The region is also notable for its cultural and economic importance. Traditional artisanal fishing practices—such as the use of *balsillas* (small rafts) and sailboats—are still employed. The reserve is expected to benefit approximately 9,500 artisanal fishers by improving formalization, sustainable resource use, and access to markets.

The legal framework of the reserve ensures that pre-existing rights are respected while enabling scientific research and contributing to the continuity of ecological processes. The creation of the reserve also advances Peru’s international commitments on marine biodiversity conservation.

== See also ==
- List of marine protected areas of Peru
