= San Fernando National Reserve =

Protected area in Peru

- IUCN category VI (protected area with sustainable use of natural resources)
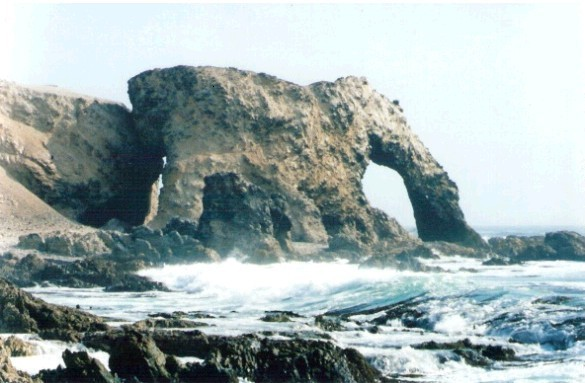
- The "Elephant" of Marcona, a tourist attraction in the inlet.

- Location within Peru
- Location: Ica Region, Peru
- Nearest city: Nazca
- Coordinates: 14°58′17″S 75°17′42″W
- Area: 1,547.16 km^{2} (597.36 sq mi)
- Established: July 21, 2011
- Governing body: SERNANP
- Website: www.sernanp.gob.pe/san-fernando

The San Fernando National Reserve (Spanish: Reserva Nacional San Fernando, RNSF) is a protected area in southern Peru, located in the districts of Santiago (Ica Province), and Changuillo, Nazca, and Marcona (Nazca Province), within the Ica Region. It covers an area of approximately 154,716 hectares.

The reserve is composed of two distinct sectors. In the north, the mouths of the Ica River and the Grande River support riparian forests that contrast with the surrounding desert. Seasonal wetlands form near sandy beaches around Punta Caballas. The southern sector includes the San Fernando Inlet, coastal hills, and steep, rugged cliffs such as those on Mount Huasipara—the highest coastal elevation in Peru at 1,790 meters above sea level. This mountain was uplifted by the subduction of the Nazca Plate beneath the South American Plate.

== Flora and fauna ==
San Fernando National Reserve is one of the few conservation areas protecting endemic and representative species of the Peruvian marine ecosystem. It shelters marine wildlife threatened by overexploitation and pollution. The reserve lies about 470 km south of Lima, along the coast of the Marcona District.

The reserve includes three ecosystems: ocean, desert, and coastal hills. This confluence creates complex food chains and biodiversity. For example, when female South American sea lions (Otaria byronia) and South American fur seals (Arctocephalus australis) give birth, Andean condors (Vultur gryphus) feed on the placentas. Arctocephalus australis is considered endangered, and both Otaria byronia and Vultur gryphus are listed as vulnerable species (INRENA, D.S. No 013-99-AG, 1999).

Cliffs and rock faces serve as nesting grounds for numerous bird species, including red-legged cormorant (Phalacrocorax gaimardi), guanay cormorant (Phalacrocorax bougainvillii), Peruvian pelican (Pelecanus thagus), turkey vulture (Cathartes aura), Inca tern (Larosterna inca), and Taczanoz’s cinclodes (Cinclodes taczanowskii). Humboldt penguins (Spheniscus humboldti), a species native to the Peruvian coast due to the Humboldt Current, also inhabit the reserve and are considered at risk of extinction.

== Tourism and activities ==
The San Fernando Inlet is the main tourist attraction in the reserve. Punta Caballas and the mouth of the Grande River are also notable for visitors interested in ecotourism and wildlife observation.

== See also ==
- List of marine protected areas of Peru
