= Illescas National Reserve =

Protected area of Peru

- IUCN category VI (protected area with sustainable use of natural resources)
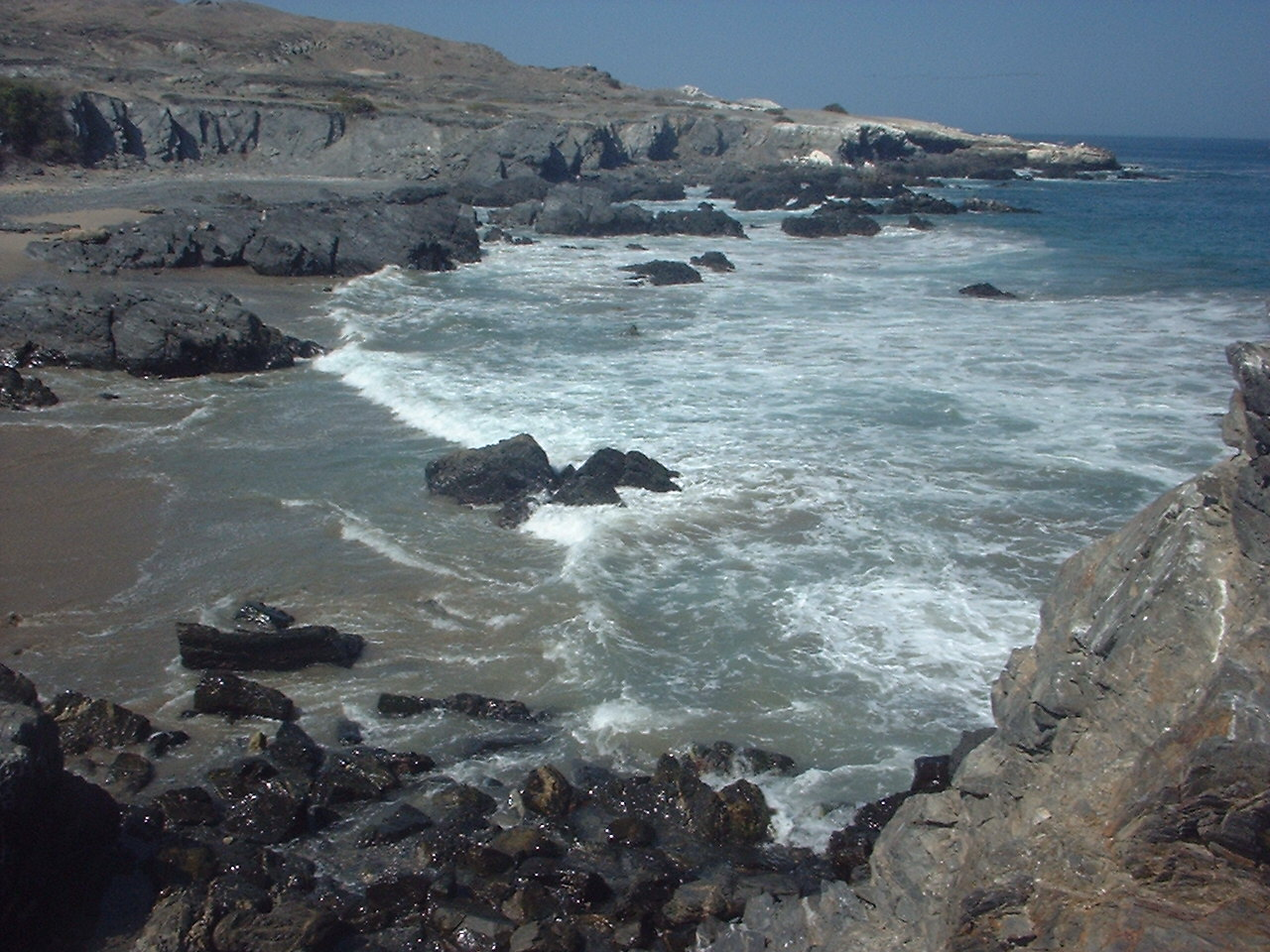

- Location within Peru
- Location: Sechura Province, Piura Region, Peru
- Coordinates: 5°58′28″S 81°5′51″W
- Area: 365.507 km^{2} (141.123 sq mi)
- Established: December 24, 2021
- Governing body: SERNANP
- Website: sernanp.gob.pe

The Illescas National Reserve (Spanish: Reserva Nacional Illescas) is a protected natural area in Peru. It is located in the Sechura Province, within the Piura Region on the northwestern coast of the country. The area was initially protected as the Illescas Reserved Zone in 2010 through Ministerial Resolution No. 251-2010-MINAM. On 24 December 2021, it was officially designated as a National Reserve by Supreme Decree No. 038-2021-MINAM.

The reserve covers an area of approximately 36,550.70 hectares. It is of particular ecological importance due to its role in the conservation of marine and avian fauna. The reserve hosts unique vegetation types that form specialized habitats adapted to the extreme conditions of the Peruvian coastal desert, which combines intense aridity with intermittent coastal humidity. These habitats serve as critical refuges for endemic species and threatened wildlife, especially bird species.

The creation of the protected area also covers much of the Illescas Peninsula, preserving its biodiversity and natural landscapes.

== See also ==
- Illescas Peninsula
