= Sierra del Divisor Reserved Zone =

Protected area in Peru

- Zona Reservada Sierra del Divisor
- Location within Peru
- Location: Loreto Region, Peru
- Nearest city: Contamana
- Coordinates: 7°11′46″S 74°46′38″W
- Area: 622.35 km^{2} (240.29 sq mi)
- Established: April 5, 2006
- Governing body: SERNANP
- Website: www.sernanp.gob.pe

The Sierra del Divisor Reserved Zone (Spanish: Zona Reservada Sierra del Divisor) is a protected area located in the Loreto Region of Peru, covering territories in the provinces of Ucayali and Requena. It was established on April 5, 2006, through Ministerial Resolution No. 283-2006-AG and initially covered more than 1.4 million hectares. Following the creation of the Sierra del Divisor National Park in 2015, a remaining portion of about 622.35 square kilometers continues to be managed as a reserved zone.

This zone is home to Indigenous peoples including the Shipibo-Conibo and Isconahua, as well as uncontacted groups. The area protects part of the Amazonian mountain range known as Sierra del Divisor, which provides crucial headwaters for cities such as Requena, Contamana, and the town of Orellana. Sulfurous hot springs and clay licks frequented by macaws are found in the western section near Contamana.

== History ==
The Sierra del Divisor Reserved Zone was created in 2006 with an original area of over 1.47 million hectares. On November 8, 2015, most of the area was designated as Sierra del Divisor National Park, covering approximately 1.35 million hectares. A remaining sector of 62,234.62 hectares continues to be managed under the reserved zone status.

== Location ==
The reserved zone lies within the districts of Maquía (Requena Province), and Vargas Guerra and Contamana (Ucayali Province). It is bounded by the Yamia creek to the north, the Pacaya River to the east, a tributary of the Ucayali River to the south, and the tributaries of the Chumuya and Uchpillo creeks to the west.

== Climate ==
The area experiences a warm and humid climate, with an average annual temperature of 25 °C. Annual precipitation ranges from 1,600 to 2,000 mm. The rainy season typically extends from October to May.

== Biodiversity ==
The limestone ranges of Contamana, Contaya, and Jaquerana host dwarf forests and dense patches of terrestrial bromeliads, contributing to the area's unique ecosystem.

== See also ==
- Sierra del Divisor
- Sierra del Divisor National Park
- Protected natural areas of Peru
