= Wildlife of Peru =

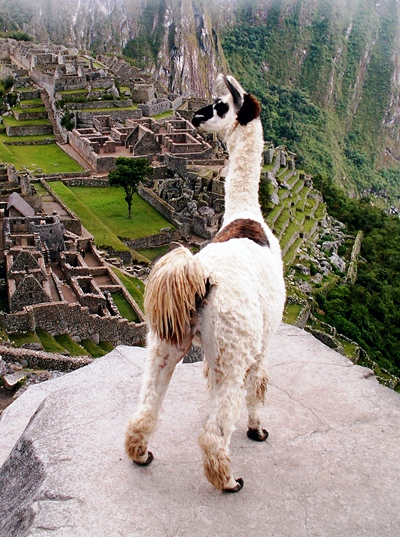
A Peruvian llama overlooking the ancient Inca ruins of Machu Picchu

Peru has some of the greatest biodiversity in the world. It belongs to the select group of mega diverse countries because of the presence of the Andes, Amazon rainforest, and the Pacific Ocean. It has the fourth-most tropical forests of any country and the ninth-most forest area. The country is ranked among the five countries with the greatest biodiversity in the world according to various studies.

== Natural protected areas ==
The 1993 Constitution of Peru recognized the natural resources and ecosystems of Peru as part of its heritage. In 1999, the National System of Natural Areas Protected by the State (Sistema Nacional de Áreas Naturales Protegidas por el Estado, SINANPE) was established by the Peruvian government. SINANPE consists of natural areas under national administration, managed and overseen by the National Service of Natural Protected Areas by the State (SERNANP). They also created a map of protection and preservation of historical–cultural heritage and nature.

Peru has 76 natural protected areas (more of 15% of the country surface area) that are preserved by the national government: 15 national parks, 9 national sanctuaries, 4 historical sanctuaries, 17 national reserves, 3 wildlife refuges, 2 landscape reserves, 10 communal reserves, 6 protected forests, 2 hunting enclosed lands and 8 reserved zones. A map was also created containing the natural protected areas.

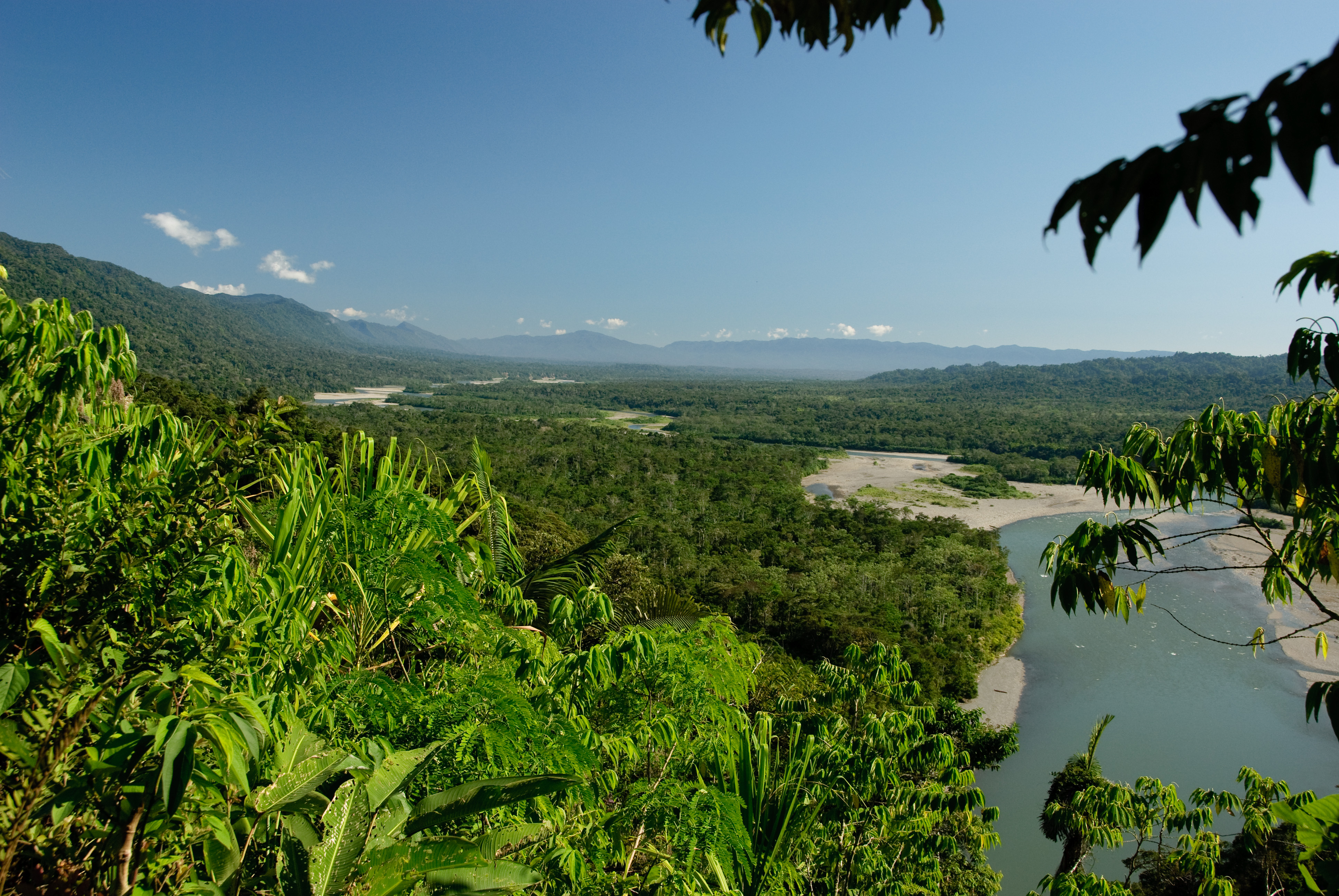
Manú National Park, Río Alto Madre de Dios

=== National parks ===
National parks are areas designated for the protection and preservation of wildlife and scenic beauty. In these areas, the exploitation of natural resources and human settlements are prohibited. The oldest national park in Peru is Cutervo, created in 1961 in the department of Cajamarca, known for its numerous caves such as San Andrés, home to the oilbird, a nocturnal bird in danger of extinction.

Other notable national parks include:

- Tingo María (Huánuco), famous for the Cave of the Owls, also inhabited by oilbirds.
- Manu (Madre de Dios and Cusco), one of the most representative areas of Amazonian biodiversity, recognized as the Manu Biosphere Reserve and a Natural World Heritage Site by UNESCO.
- Huascarán (Áncash), dominated by Mount Huascarán, the highest mountain in Peru, and home to the largest species of bromeliad, Puya raimondii, and various animal species.
- Cerros de Amotape (Piura and Tumbes), characterized by its dry forests and endangered species such as the Tumbes crocodile.
- Río Abiseo (San Martín), included in the UNESCO Natural and Cultural World Heritage.
- Yanachaga-Chemillén (Pasco), which preserves tropical forests and has important archaeological sites.
- Bahuaja-Sonene (Madre de Dios and Puno), which includes tropical forests and the Heath pampas.

=== National reserves ===
National reserves are areas designated for the protection and propagation of wildlife. Some of the most important include:

- Pampa Galeras-Bárbara D’Achille (Ayacucho), dedicated to the vicuña.
- Junín (Junín), which protects the ecosystem and biodiversity of Lake Junín.
- Paracas (Ica), focused on the conservation of marine ecosystems and cultural heritage.
- Lachay (Lima), intended for the restoration and protection of the Lachay hill ecosystem.
- Pacaya-Samiria (Loreto), which conserves lowland forest ecosystems and promotes native populations.
- Salinas y Aguada Blanca (Arequipa and Moquegua), for the conservation of flora, fauna, and landscape formations.
- Calipuy (La Libertad), focused on the protection of guanacos.
- Titicaca (Puno), dedicated to the conservation of the ecosystems and landscapes of Lake Titicaca.

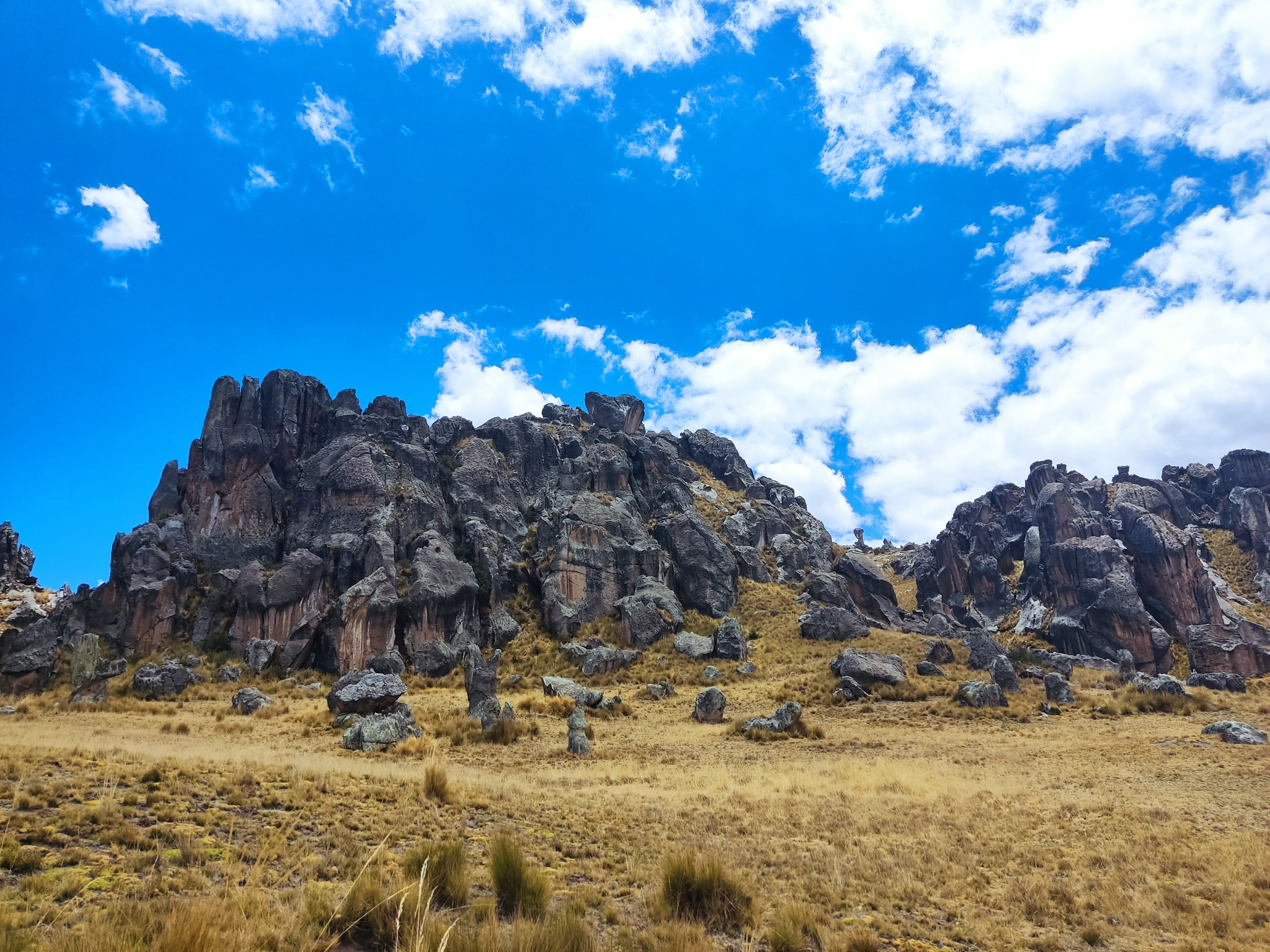
Rock formations at Huayllay

=== Other conservation units ===
In addition to national parks and reserves, Peru has various protection units, including:

- National sanctuaries such as Huayllay, Calipuy, Lagunas de Mejía, Ampay, Manglares de Tumbes, and Tabaconas Namballe.
- Historical sanctuaries such as Chacramarca, Pampas de Ayacucho, and Machu Picchu.
- National forests such as Biabo Cordillera Azul, Mariscal Cáceres, Pastaza-Morona-Marañón, and Alexander von Humboldt.
- Protection forests such as Aledaño Bocatoma del Canal Nuevo Imperial, Puquío Santa Rosa, Pui-Pui, San Matías-San Carlos, Alto Mayo, and Pagaibamba.
- Communal reserves such as Yanesha.
- Hunting reserves such as Sunchubamba and El Angolo.
- Reserved zones such as Manu, Laquipampa, Apurímac, Pantanos de Villa, Tambopata-Candamo, Batán Grande, Algarrobal El Moro, Tumbes, Güeppi, Chancaybaños, and Aymaru Lupaca.

These various units of protection, conservation, and research reflect Peru's extraordinary biological richness and cultural heritage, making the country one of the world's privileged natural regions.

== Animals ==
Peru has over 1,800 species of birds (120 endemic to Peru), and 500 species of mammals and over 300 species of reptiles. Peru has hundreds of mammals including some rare species like the puma, jaguar and spectacled bear, that live in the canopy so jungle lodges usually construct towers to observe life above. The Pacific holds a bounty of sea bass, flounder, anchovies, tuna, crustacean (crab or lobster), shellfish and seals. The Pacific also has a lot of sharks, sperm whales, and whales. The birds of Peru have an economic importance, because of the concentrations of guano deposits that are exported to different countries. Alpaca is also a native of Peru which is now domesticated for its fiber.

=== Insects ===
As of March 2009 scientists have discovered two new species of beetles, Eriopis canrash and Cycloneda andresii.

=== Mammals ===
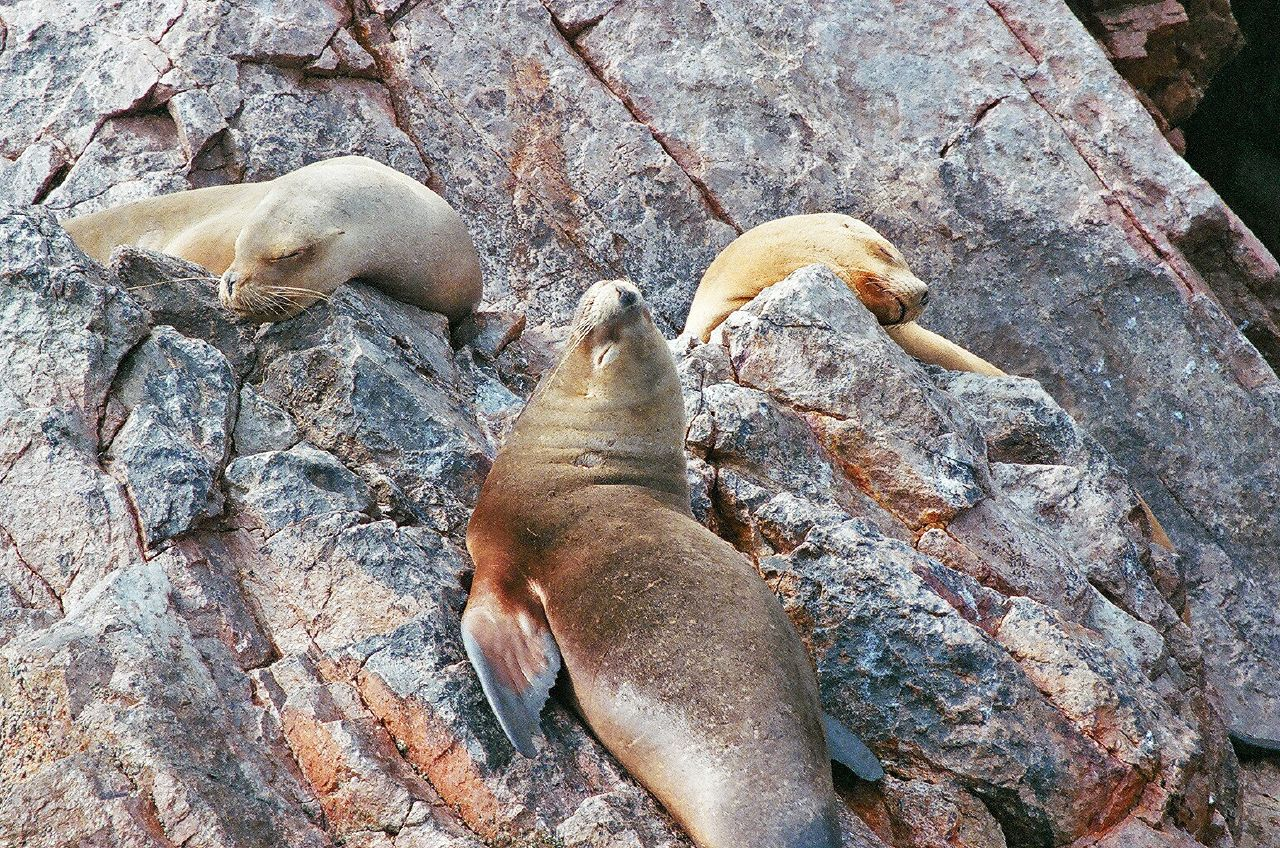
Sea lions in the Ballestas Islands

Peru has over 500 species of mammals, of which about 70 are endemic and about 109 are threatened or endangered. These include spectacular species like the jaguar and spectacled bear and rare endemic species like the yellow-tailed woolly monkey.

In January 2007, scientists discovered a new species of cloud-forest rodent of the spiny rat family (Isothrix barbarabrownae) in Manu.

In March 2009, scientists discovered a new species of mouse (Akodon sp.nov)

=== Birds ===
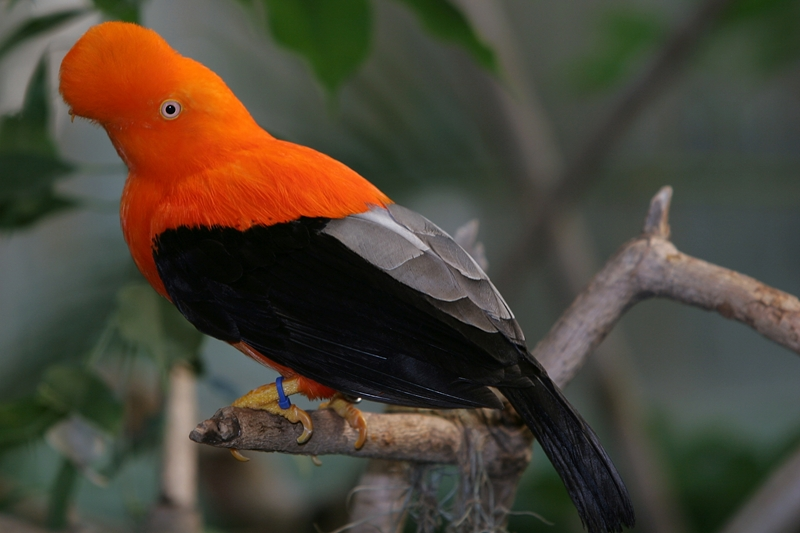
Andean cock-of-the-rock, Peru's national bird

Peru's national bird is the Andean cock-of-the-rock.

Peru has over 1,800 species of birds, the second-highest number of any country in the world. New species of birds are still being discovered and cataloged by scientists. 42 species from Peru have been officially added to science in the last 30 years. In January 2010, scientists found a new population of five long-whiskered owlets which are very rare in the wild.

On February 22, 1990, Grace P. Servat found a new distinctive species of the tyrant flycatcher called the rufous twistwing. Which remained undescribed and unidentified until re-discovered by Daniel F. Lane in November 2002. Then on September 15, 2003, Frank P. Lambert obtained the first-natural history of the bird.

The Manu Biosphere Reserve is believed to have the highest concentration of bird species in the world, with 1,000—one out of every nine on the Earth.

=== Reptiles ===
Peru has around 300 species of reptiles of which around 100 are endemic. Peru's reptile fauna includes spectacular species like giant anacondas and caimans, as well as many other snakes, lizards and turtles.

=== Amphibians ===
There are about 380 species of frogs in Peru (based on this search at the Amphibian Species of the World website). It is easy to see a few species on night hikes in the lowland rain forest areas in Tambopata, Manu or Iquitos. Ten new frog species have been discovered over the past two years in the cloud forests of the Peruvian Andes.

==== Frogs ====
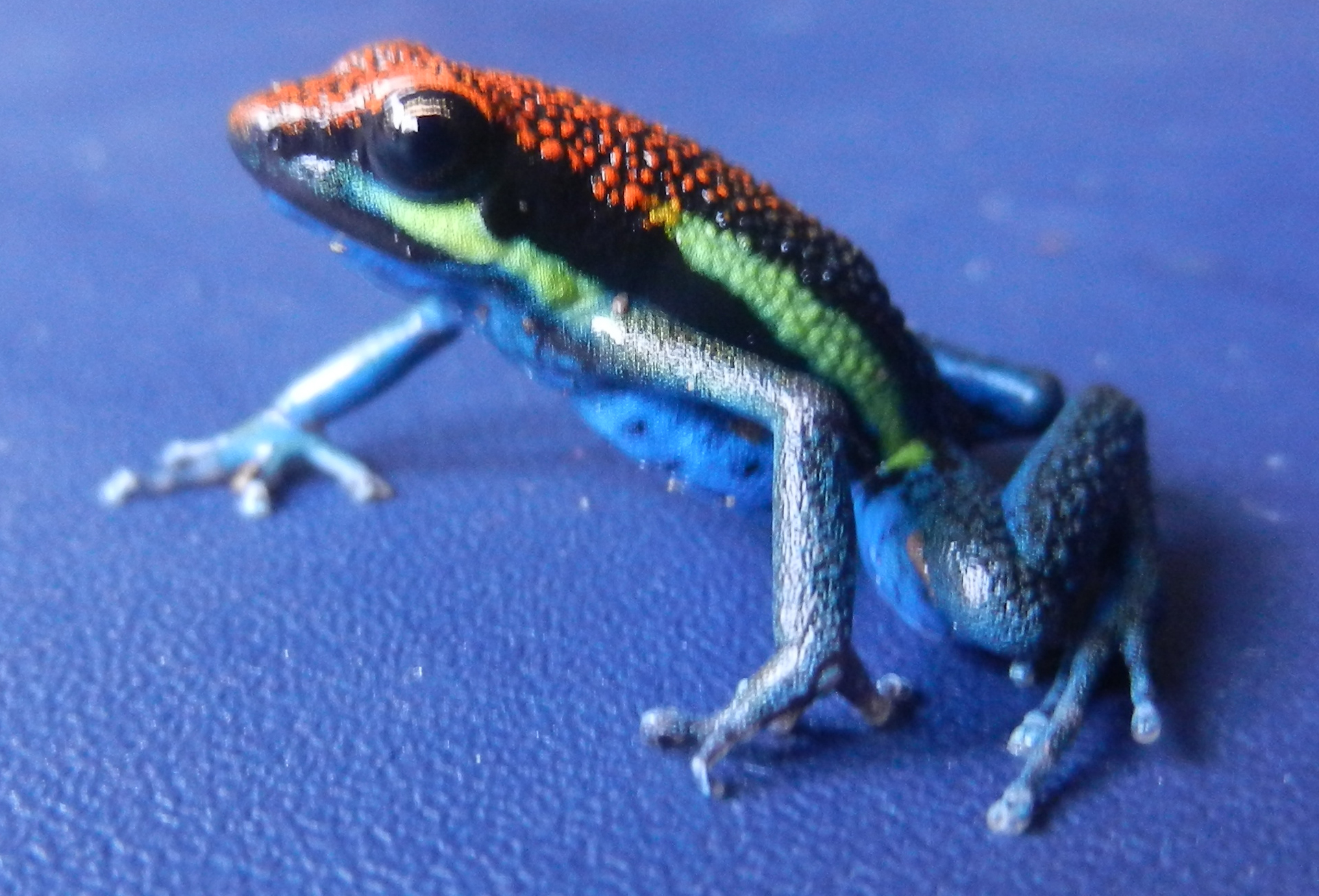
Ameerega macero in the Madre de Dios region

Some species of frog found in Peru are:

- Monkey frog - Phyllomedusa bicolor
- Tree frog - Dendropsophus rhodopeplus
- Three-striped poison dart frog - Epipedobates trivittatus

==== Salamanders ====
- Nauta mushroomtongue salamander - Bolitoglossa altamazonica
- Rio Santa Rosa salamander - Bolitoglossa digitigrada
- Peru mushroomtongue salamander - Bolitoglossa peruviana

In March 2009, scientists discovered a pygmy frog. The pygmy frog is unlike many other species of frog because its eggs don't become tadpoles like those of most frogs. Also, they only lay two eggs.

== Plants ==
Peru also has an equally diverse amount of plants. The coast of Peru is usually barren apart from some cacti that grow there. Hilly areas known as lomas such as Lachay, include many endemic species. The river valleys also contain unique plant life. The Highlands above the tree-line is known as puna, where bushes, cactus and drought-resistant plants, such as ichu grass extend up to the zone of snow-capped mountains. The most spectacular plant in Peru is the gigantic Puya raimondii seen near Huaraz. On the lower slopes of the Andes are steep-sided cloud-forests with among it can sustain moss, orchids, and bromeliads. The very wet Amazon rainforest contains useful lumber, and resins plus strange canopy plants and palm trees.

As of March 2009 scientists have discovered a new kind of plant Senecio sanmarcosensis which is part of the high-Andean wetlands vegetation. It is only found at 14,764 feet (4,500 m) above sea level.

== Locations ==
The Department of Madre de Dios has acquired the title of "the biodiversity capital of Peru".

Peru has some good locations to watch wildlife, including:

- Bahuaja-Sonene National Park
- Ballestas Islands (Islas Ballestas)
- Colca Canyon
- Huascarán National Park - This park is located in the central part of Peru. It includes El Huascaran - the highest peak in Peru. Special species include the spectacled bear and the vicuña.
- Iquitos
- Manu National Park - Manu is located on the eastern slopes of the Andes and stretches to the lowland rain forest on the Brazilian border.
- Pacaya-Samiria National Reserve - It is located in the headwaters of the Amazon River in northeastern Peru, on an alluvial plain between the Marañon and Ucayali river systems. It is accessible via the Amazon River through the city of Iquitos in the department of Loreto, or through the city of Tarapoto via Yurimaguas. This is one of the best places for wildlife spotting, which is a Ramsar site and the largest government-protected area in the floodable Amazon rainforest in South America.
- Pampa Galeras National Reserve.

== See also ==
- List of Peruvian monkey species
