= El Angolo Game Reserve =

Hunting reserve in Peru

- Coto de Caza El Angolo
- IUCN category VI (protected area with sustainable use of natural resources)
- Location within Peru
- Interactive map of El Angolo Game Reserve
- Location: Peru; Piura
- Nearest city: Sullana; Máncora
- Coordinates: 4°18′07″S 80°47′47″W
- Area: 650 km^{2} (250 sq mi)
- Established: July 1, 1975
- Governing body: SERNANP
- Website: Coto de Caza El Angolo

El Angolo is a game reserve in northern Peru. It is considered part of the Noroeste Biosphere Reserve, which includes Cerros de Amotape National Park and Tumbes National Reserve, as declared by UNESCO in 1977.

== Geography ==
El Angolo Game Reserve spans an area of 65,000 hectares (650.00 km^{2}) in the region of Piura, Peru. Its elevational range goes from 200 to 1200 m above sea level.

== Climate ==
Temperatures in the reserve are between 15 °C and 39 °C, with a rainy season from December to April. It is advisable to visit the area after the rainy season has finished.

== Ecology ==
=== Flora ===
El Angolo Game Reserve protects part of the seasonally dry tropical forests, an endangered ecosystem of which only 5% is under protection in Peru. Among the plant species present in the area are: angolo (Albizia multiflora), algarrobo (Prosopis pallida), ceibo (Ceiba trischistandra), frejolillo (Erythrina smithiana), overo (Cordia lutea), hualtaco (Loxopterygium huasango), almendro (Geoffroea spinosa), pasallo (Eriotheca ruizii), palo santo (Bursera graveolens), cedro (Cedrela sp.), Terminalia valverdeae, Ficus pertusa, etc.

=== Fauna ===
The white-tailed deer is the only animal managed as game in this protected area. Mammals protected in the reserve include: the cougar, the jaguar, the puma, the northern tamandua, the Guayaquil squirrel, the Sechuran fox, etc.

Among the birds reported in the area are: the Andean tinamou, the Pacific pygmy owl, the pale-browed tinamou, the king vulture, the Tumbes sparrow, the red-masked parakeet, the Andean condor, the great egret, the cocoi heron, the ochre-bellied dove, the long-billed starthroat, etc.

== Activities ==
Trophy hunting is the main activity, with the hunting season being from May to November. Hunting permits must be coordinated with the local hunting club (Club de Caza, Pesca, Turismo y Recreación de Piura), which manages the area together with the park's authorities.

Other activities in the area are: birdwatching, hiking, fishing and scientific research.
