= Tumbes National Reserve =

Protected area in Peru

- IUCN category VI (protected area with sustainable use of natural resources)
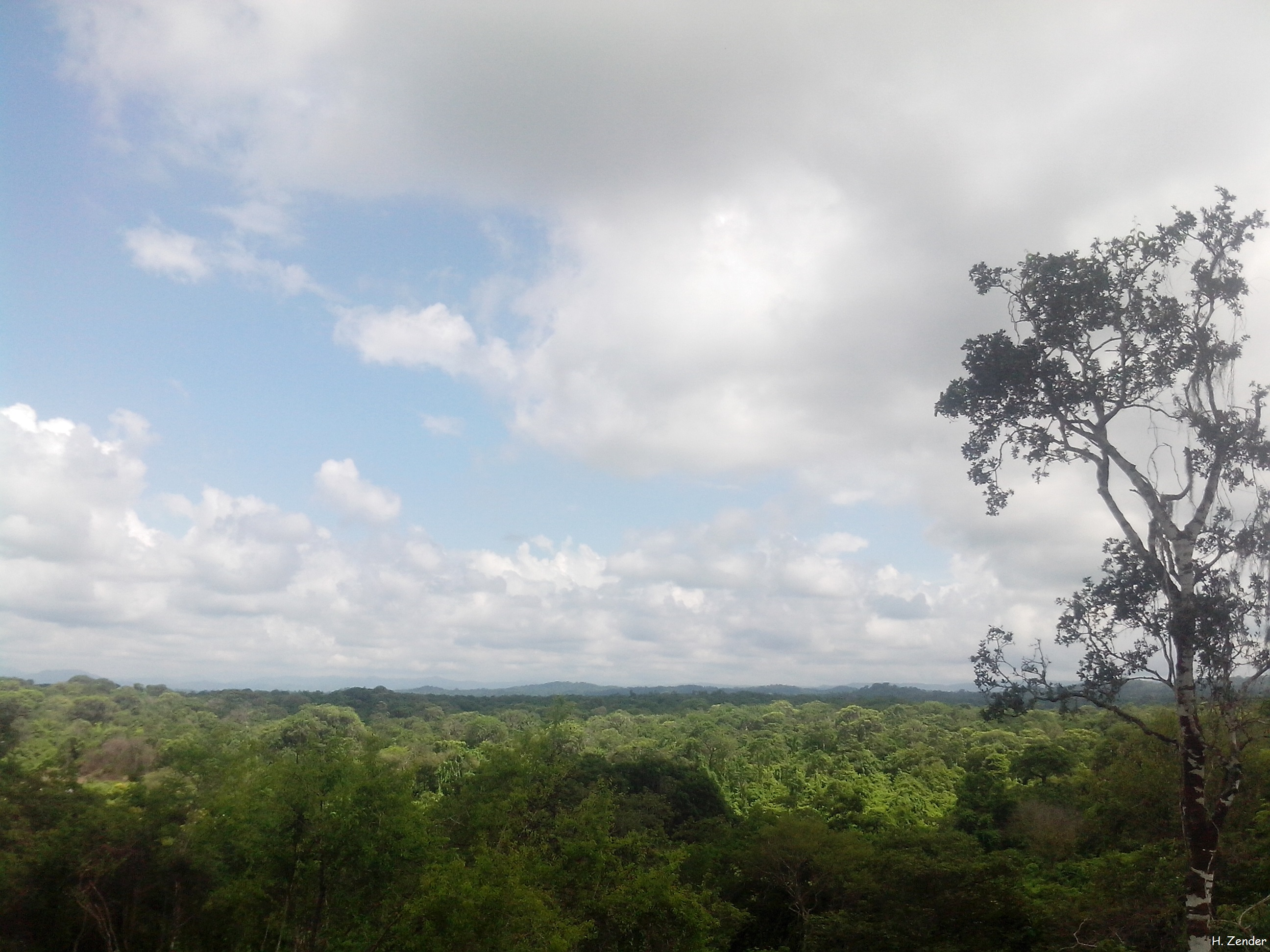

- Location within Peru
- Interactive map of Tumbes National Reserve
- Location: Peru; Tumbes
- Nearest city: Tumbes
- Coordinates: 3.897°S 80.301°W
- Area: 192.67 km^{2} (74.39 mi^{2})
- Established: July 7, 2006
- Governing body: SERNANP
- Website: Reserva Nacional de Tumbes

Tumbes National Reserve is a protected area established in 2006 and located in the region of Tumbes, Peru; near the border with Ecuador. It spans an area of 751 km^{2} (290 mi^{2}) and along with Cerros de Amotape National Park and El Angolo Game Preserve is part of the Noroeste Biosphere Reserve designated by UNESCO.

== History ==
In 1957, the Peruvian government created the Tumbes National Forest with an area of 75.102 hectares, to promote the rational exploitation of the forest resources. However, wood extraction was an important activity in the area since the 1940s and the forest was already heavily exploited.

In 1974, a law prohibiting wood extraction (except for very mature trees) in Tumbes was passed.

UNESCO declared the Tumbes National Forest as part of the Noroeste Biosphere Reserve in 1977.

In 1994, the government creates by a decree the Tumbes Reserved Zone in the former area of the Tumbes National Forest. The aims of the creation of the reserved zone were to protect a representative area of the Pacific tropical forest, and its threatened flora and fauna.

On July 7, 2006, the Peruvian government declared part of the area as the Tumbes National Reserve. The area with the highest conservation priority was merged into Cerros de Amotape National Park, while the remaining area was declared compatible with traditional land use and defined as spanning 19,266.72 hectares (192.67 km^{2}).

== Geography ==
The area is characterized by a hilly terrain with some flat areas. It is covered with seasonally dry forest and tropical forest, due to the more humid climate resulting from marine currents and atmospheric factors.

== Climate ==
The climate in the reserve is subtropical influenced some years by the El Niño phenomenon and the average annual precipitation is 1350 mm. Temperatures range from 35 °C during summer (peak in February to April), to 15 °C in winter (peak in July and August).

== Ecology ==
=== Flora ===
The dominant vegetation type in the reserve is the seasonally dry tropical forest. Among the tree species found in this protected area are: hualtaco (Loxopterygium huasango), ceibo (Ceiba trischistandra), algarrobo (Prosopis spp.), angolo (Albizia multiflora), quipo (Cavanillesia platanifolia), guayacán (Tabebuia sp.) and palo santo (Bursera graveolens).

=== Fauna ===
Among the mammals protected in the reserve are: the mantled howler monkey, the jaguar, the margay, the neotropical otter, the Guayaquil squirrel, the tayra and the white-tailed deer.

Reptiles found in the reserve include: the American crocodile, the eyelash viper and lizards of genus Dicrodon.

A total of 175 bird species have been found in the reserve, including: the grey-cheeked parakeet, the yellow-faced parrotlet, the Peruvian antpitta, the grey-backed hawk, the magnificent frigatebird, the white-tailed jay, the common black hawk, the American yellow warbler, the great-tailed grackle and the pale-legged hornero.

== Activities ==
Although no facilities or paths for tourists have been built yet, the establishment of a tourist zone is on the works. The reserve authorities seek to promote activities like birdwatching, hiking and tour canoeing.

== Environmental issues ==
Wood extraction; wild honey extraction; hunting; river pollution (from gold mines in Ecuador as well as domestic waste from villages near the reserve) and illegal human settlements are the main problems the reserve faces.
