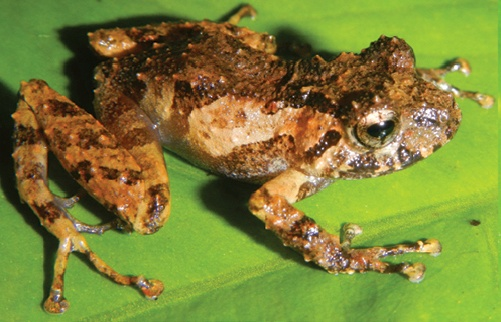
- Female

Conservation status
- Least Concern (IUCN 3.1)

Scientific classification
- Kingdom: Animalia
- Phylum: Chordata
- Class: Amphibia
- Order: Anura
- Clade: Brachycephaloidea
- Family: Craugastoridae
- Genus: Pristimantis
- Species: P. ashaninka

Binomial name
- Pristimantis ashaninka Lehr & Moravec, 2017
- In red, location of the Pui Pui Protection Forest

= Pristimantis ashaninka =

Species of frog

Pristimantis ashaninka is a species of frog in the Craugastoridae family. It is found in the Pui Pui Protection Forest in central Peru. It is 23 to 26 millimeters long, and is characterized by containing small conical tubercles in its skin, giving a spiny appearance, and by having no tympanic membrane. The species was described in 2017 after morphological and genetic analyses and was named Pristimantis ashaninka in honor of the indigenous people Asháninka, who live in the regions near the protection forest. The species was listed by the International Union for Conservation of Nature as a least-concern species. There is still no information about its behavior and/or reproduction, but it is assumed that the tadpoles have direct development, as this is a common characteristic of the genus.

== Taxonomy ==
The species was described by herpetologists Edgar Lehr and Jiří Moravec on January 12, 2017, by the scientific journal ZooKeys. From the similarity to other species and from genetic analyses, it was possible to identify that the species belonged to the genus Pristimantis. After this, tests were done to identify the species, such as morphological and DNA analyses and comparisons with other species, and from the data obtained it was possible to discover that it was a new species. So, the species was named Pristimantis ashaninka in honor of the indigenous people Asháninka, who live in the Peruvian regions of Huánuco, Junín, Pasco and Ucayali.

== Distribution and conservation ==
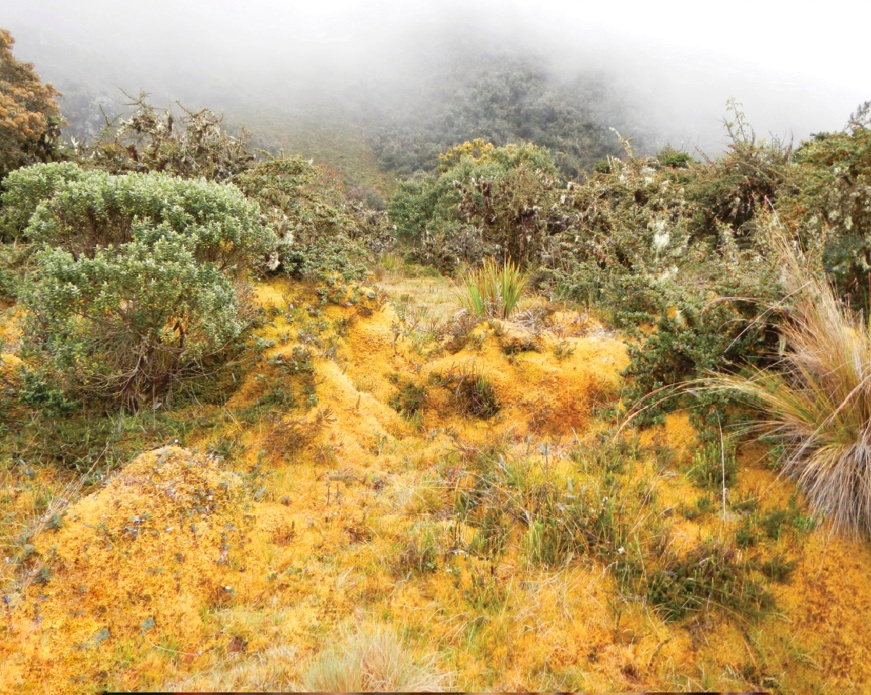
View of mountainous forest, in the Pui Pui Protection Forest, where the species is found.

The species is currently found in only one location, in the northeastern Pui Pui Protection Forest, 18 kilometers from the city of Satipo in Peru. The site is a valley through which the Bravo river flows, with altitudes between 1,700 and 1,800 meters, and has around the valley mountainous slopes covered by primary forests 15 to 20 meters high, where bromeliads, ferns and mosses are abundant. The temperature varies between 6 and 15 °C, and is characterized by a cold and humid climate. It is common to find several species of amphibians and reptiles in the area, several of which have been described recently, such as the Attenborough's rubber frog (Pristimantis attenboroughi). The species has been reviewed by the International Union for Conservation of Nature (IUCN) as a least-concern species because there is no significant threat to its habitat, which is currently preserved, and because it is likely to have a larger range. With the discovery of the species, 130 species are counted in the genus Pristimantis in Peru.

== Description ==
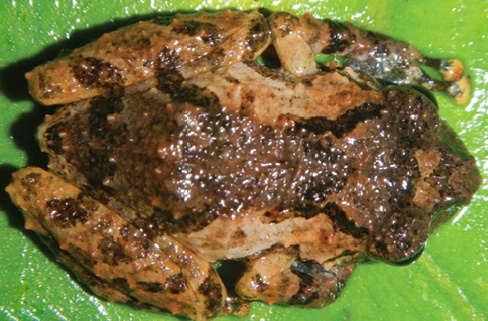
Dorsal view

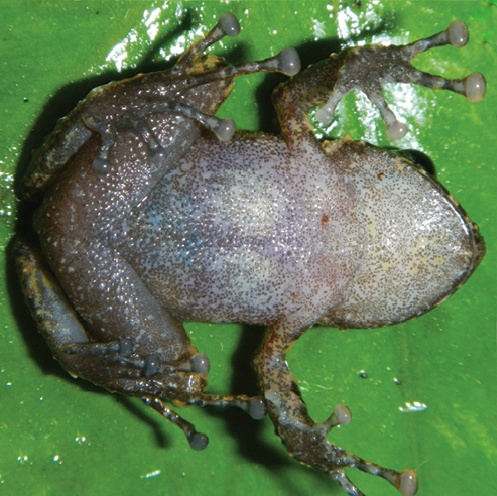
Ventral view

The species measures between 23.1 and 26.7 millimeters. Its head is slightly narrower than its body, with the latter being longer and wider. It has no neural crest, and its muzzle is moderately long, being under-crowned when viewed from above and rounded when viewed from the side. The distance between the eye and nostril is 77% of the eye diameter, with the nostril in a narrow protuberance, directed to the back and side. The canthus rostralis is fairly long, being rounded when viewed from the side and slightly concave when viewed from above. It has several tubercles, including on top of the eyelids. The supratympanic fold is small and clear, extending to the eyelid, and has no tympanic membrane. Its choana is small and oval.

The back has a large, reddish-brown, hourglass-shaped spot with rounded, cream-brown edges on the side. It has two dark grayish-brown markings on the sacral region, delimiting the hourglass region. The upper front legs are creamy brown, and the hind legs are reddish brown, except for the discs, which are creamy brown. The throat, crop, legs, and belly are grayish, and the iris is bronze, with small black spots.

There are no significant differences between males and females, obeying the color patterns of the species. The young and juveniles, on the other hand, have some differences, with the tubercles more evident, and the skin on the back darker, with the color of the throat varying from black to gray.

The species is differentiated from others of the genus by having tubercles on the skin on the back, giving the appearance of being spiny, by the absence of the tympanic membrane, and by the black dots on the iris. The most similar species are Pristimantis lirellus, Pristimantis martiae, and Pristimantis rhabdocnemus, but it also differs from these by being larger.
