= Pudella carlae =

Scientific classification
- Kingdom: Animalia
- Phylum: Chordata
- Class: Mammalia
- Order: Artiodactyla
- Family: Cervidae
- Subfamily: Capreolinae
- Genus: Pudella
- Species: P. carlae

Binomial name
- Pudella carlae Barrio, Gutiérrez & D'Elía, 2024

Species of deer

Pudella carlae, the Peruvian Yungas pudu, is a species of deer from Peru. It was found in 2024 to be a distinct species from the northern pudu, from which it is separated geographically by the Huancabamba Depression. It is the first living deer species to be described in the 21st century.

== Etymology ==
The specific epithet carlae honors fellow biologist Carla Gazzolo, who saved co-author Javier Barrio's life after a vascular problem.

== Taxonomy ==
Pudu mephistophiles was historically divided into two subspecies, the type subspecies P. m. mephistophiles with its type locality near Papallacta, Ecuador, and P. m. wetmorei with its type locality in Puracé National Natural Park, Colombia. Both were later found to be individual variations inside one of two distinct populations, spanning through Colombia, Ecuador, and the northernmost part of Peru. The second population was identified in central Peru, separated from the first by the Huancabamba Depression.

The southern population was found to be a distinct species from P. mephistophiles in 2024. At first believed by the researchers to be a subspecies of the latter, it was finally described as the new species P. carlae, distinguished by both morphological differences and genetic variation. It has been reported to be the first extant deer species discovered in the 21st century, and the first in the New World in more than 60 years.

The study describing P. carlae found that it and the northern pudu, P. mephistophiles, were not directly related to the southern pudu, P. puda. As the latter is the type species of the genus Pudu, the former two were placed in the resurrected genus Pudella to account for this distinction. That genus was originally erected in 1913 to account for major differences between the northern and southern pudu.

Both genera Pudu and Pudella belong to the tribe Odocoileini, which includes the Neotropical deer, although they are not immediate relatives.

== Description ==
Pudella carlae is a stocky, short-legged cervid. It is 38 centimetres (15 in) tall and weighs 7 to 9 kilograms (15 to 20 lb), making it larger than P. mephistophiles, the smallest known cervid species, but still smaller than Pudu puda.

The body fur is coarse, long, and orange-brown, distinguishing it from the darker coloration of the other two species. The head is mostly black, although not as fully as in P. mephistophiles, as the body's coloration extends to the forehead. Ears are oval, contrasting with the rounded ears of P. mephistophiles and the pointed ears of P. puda. The shape of the incisors also differs from those of other pudus, being more spatulated than in P. mephistophiles. The skull is also different, being more elongated, with larger premaxilla and nasal bones, wider braincase and zygomatic breadth.

== Ecology and behavior ==
Pudella carlae feeds on ferns, as well as on leaves and berries, mostly from bushes and small trees, although it has been reported to climb inclined tree trunks to eat their leaves.

== Range and habitat ==
Pudella carlae is found to the southeast of the Huancabamba Depression in the Peruvian Yungas, in cloud forests along the eastern side of the Peruvian Andes. It is found in such areas as the Rio Abiseo National Park, the Yanachaga–Chemillén National Park, the Pampa Hermosa National Sanctuary, the Pui Pui Protection Forest, and the Alto Mayo Protection Forest.

It lives at altitudes ranging from 1,800 to 3,300 metres (5,900 to 10,800 ft).

== See also ==
- List of living mammal species described in the 2020s
