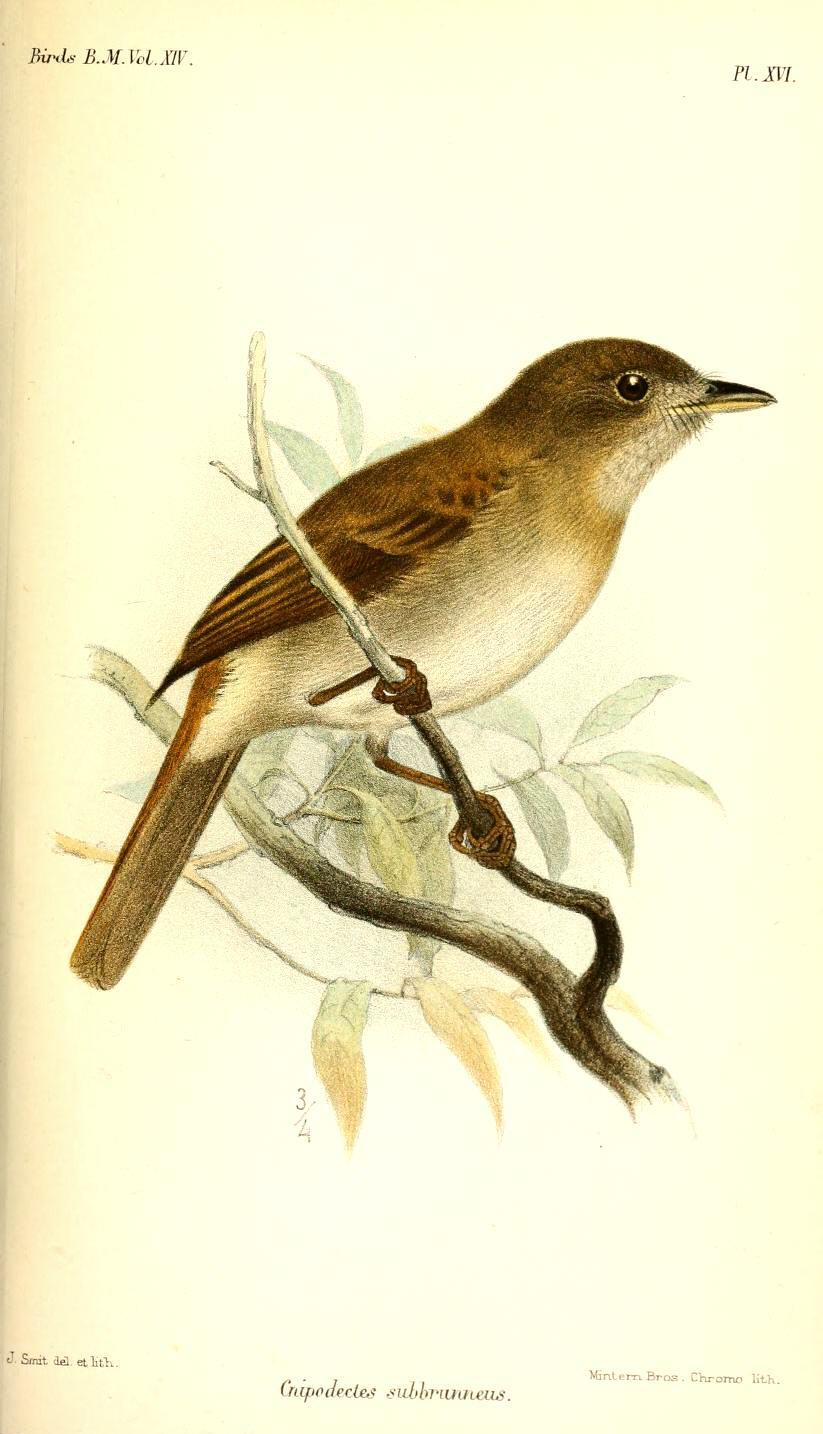
- Brownish twistwing (Cnipodectes subbrunneus)

Scientific classification
- Kingdom: Animalia
- Phylum: Chordata
- Class: Aves
- Order: Passeriformes
- Family: Tyrannidae
- Genus: Cnipodectes; P.L. Sclater & Salvin, 1873

Species
- 2, see text

= Twistwing =

Twistwings

Genus of birds

Twistwings are two species of Tyrant flycatchers from the genus Cnipodectes. They are restricted to northern and western South America and southern Central America. The genus was monotypic until a new species, Cnipodectes superrufus, was described from Peru and Bolivia in 2007. Their common name refers to the modified primaries. The genus contains two species.

== Species ==
Genus Cnipodectes – P.L. Sclater & Salvin, 1873 – two species
Common name	Scientific name and subspecies	Range	Size and ecology	IUCN status and estimated population
brownish flycatcher, Brownish twistwing	Cnipodectes subbrunneus (Sclater, PL, 1860)	Bolivia, Brazil, Colombia, Ecuador, Panama, and Peru.	Size: Habitat: Diet:	LC
Rufous twistwing	Cnipodectes superrufus Lane, Servat, Valqui & Lambert, 2007	south-eastern Peru, northern Bolivia and far western Brazil	Size: Habitat: Diet:	VU
