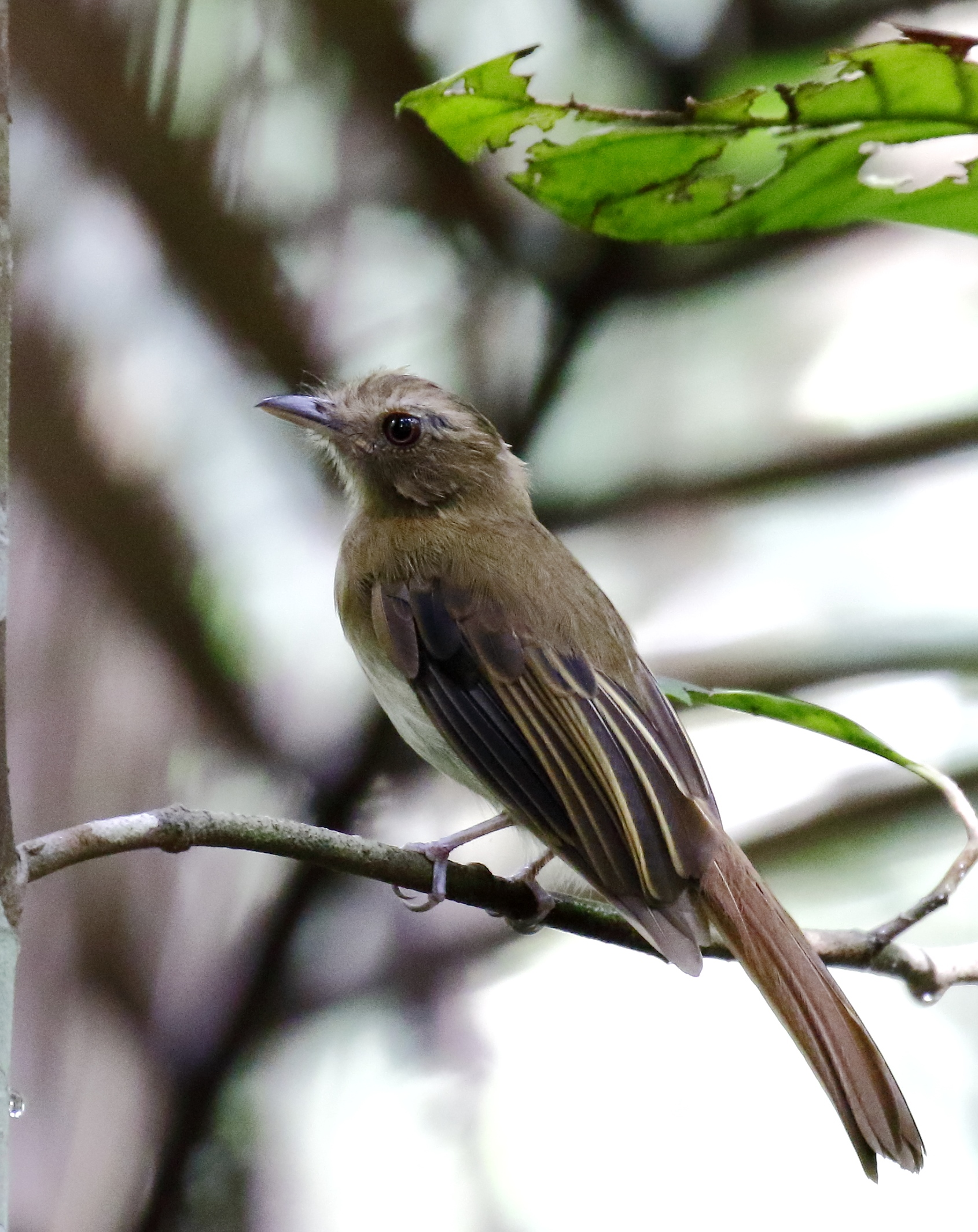
- Brownish twistwing at Careiro, Amazonas state, Brazil.

Conservation status
- Least Concern (IUCN 3.1)

Scientific classification
- Kingdom: Animalia
- Phylum: Chordata
- Class: Aves
- Order: Passeriformes
- Family: Tyrannidae
- Genus: Cnipodectes
- Species: C. subbrunneus

Binomial name
- Cnipodectes subbrunneus (Sclater, PL, 1860)

= Brownish twistwing =

Species of bird

The brownish twistwing (Cnipodectes subbrunneus) is a species of bird in the family Tyrannidae, the tyrant flycatchers. It is found in Bolivia, Brazil, Colombia, Ecuador, Panama, and Peru.

== Taxonomy and systematics ==
The brownish twistwing was originally described in 1860 as Cyclorhynchus subbrunneus. It eventually acquired the English name "brownish flycatcher" and still later was called "brown flycatcher" by a few authors. Following suggestions put forward in 1994 taxonomists gradually adopted the name brownish twistwing. It was the sole member of genus Cnipodectes until the rufous twistwing (C. superrufus) was described in 2007.

The brownish twistwing has two subspecies, the nominate C. s. subbrunneus (Sclater, PL, 1860) and C. s. minor (Sclater, PL, 1884).

== Description ==
The brownish twistwing is 14 to 18 cm (5.5 to 7.1 in) long. The sexes have almost the same plumage; males are larger than females. Adult males of the nominate subspecies are mostly dull brown. They have a slight grayish tinge on the crown, buff lores, and prominent rictal bristles. Their wings are somewhat duskier with thin rufous-buff edges on the coverts and tertials. Their outer primaries have stiff twisted shafts that give the species its English name. Their rump and tail are a more rufous brown than the back. Their throat is pale brown or grayish brown, their breast somewhat browner, their belly gray or dingy yellowish white, and their vent area buff. Females and juveniles do not have the modified primaries; females may have a slightly yellower belly than males. Subspecies C. s. minor is slightly paler than the nominate with a faint olive tinge to the brown. Both sexes of both subspecies have a brown to orange or reddish iris, a wide bill with a black maxilla and orange-yellow mandible, and black legs and feet.

== Distribution and habitat ==
The brownish twistwing has a disjunct distribution. The nominate subspecies has two populations. One is found on the Caribbean slope for the full length of Panama and on the Pacific slope from the Canal Zone, and from both into Colombia east to Bolívar Department and south along the Pacific slope through Chocó Department. The other is found on the Pacific slope for most of the length of Ecuador. However, the two ranges may be contiguous. Subspecies C. s. minor is found in the western Amazon Basin from southeastern Colombia south through eastern Ecuador and eastern Peru into far northwestern Bolivia and east into western Brazil to the Rio Negro and lower Rio Madeira.

The brownish twistwing inhabits humid lowland evergreen forest in all of its ranges. In the west it also is found in drier deciduous forest. In Ecuador and Peru it occurs almost entirely in terra firme forest, and in Bolivia alone it is associated with bamboo. In all forest types it greatly favors dense vegetation and vine tangles in the forest understory. It is a bird of the lowands, reaching about 1,200 m (3,900 ft) in Colombia but only 600 m (2,000 ft) in Ecuador.

== Behavior ==
=== Movement ===
The brownish twistwing is a year-round resident.

=== Feeding ===
The brownish twistwing feeds on insects, though details are lacking. It typically forages singly and very rarely joins mixed-species feeding flocks. It tends to be sedentary, but when perched often slowly lifts one wing behind its back.

=== Breeding ===
The brownish twistwing breeds between January and April in western Colombia and includes June in its season in the south of the country. Its breeding season elsewhere is not known. Its nest is a closed cylinder up to about 1 m (3 ft) long with a side entrance that hangs from a branch or aerial root. It is made from plant fibers and often has some straggling from the bottom. The clutch size, incubation period, time to fledging, and details of parental care are not known.

=== Vocal and non-vocal sounds ===
The male brownish twistwing's display song is "a sharp and emphatic 'keeéuw-keeéuw', sometimes only a single 'keeéuw' or a 'keeéuw-'keeéuw-kuw'". It often precedes the song with a bill snap and lifts its wings during the song. Both sexes give "an arresting and more nasal 'kuuuuwít!, kuuuuwít!' " call. In display flight its wings produce an audible whirr.

== Status ==
The IUCN has assessed the brownish twistwing as being of Least Concern. It has a large range; its population size is not known and is believed to be decreasing. No immediate threats have been identified. It is considered locally fairly common in Panama and eastern Ecuador, "nowhere common" in Colombia, and "uncommon and patchy" in Peru. It occurs in many protected areas and "may be capable of persisting in isolated forest fragments".
