= Loxopterygium grisebachii =

Conservation status
- Vulnerable (IUCN 2.3)

Scientific classification
- Kingdom: Plantae
- Clade: Tracheophytes
- Clade: Angiosperms
- Clade: Eudicots
- Clade: Rosids
- Order: Sapindales
- Family: Anacardiaceae
- Genus: Loxopterygium
- Species: L. grisebachii

Binomial name
- Loxopterygium grisebachii Hieron. & Lorentz ex Griseb.

Synonyms
- Loxopterygium grisebachii Hieron. & H.Lorentz

Species of flowering plant

Loxopterygium grisebachii is a species of plant in the family Anacardiaceae. It is found in Argentina and Bolivia. It is threatened by habitat loss.
