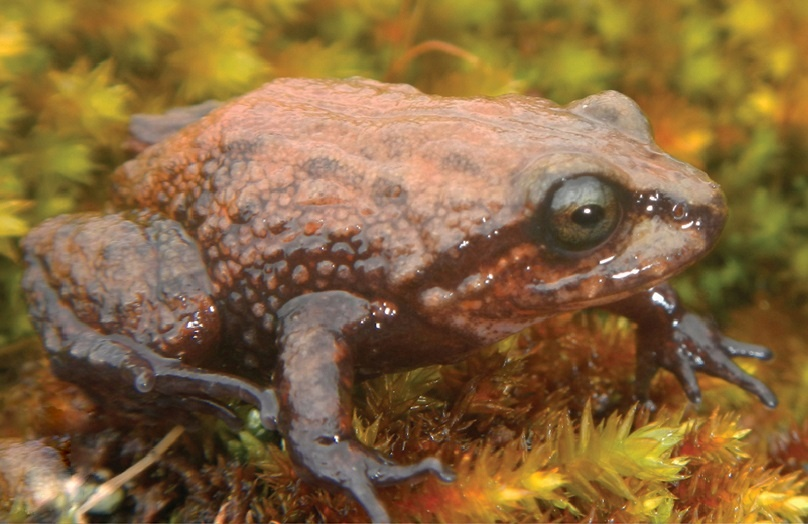
- Holotype, a male

Conservation status
- Near Threatened (IUCN 3.1)

Scientific classification
- Kingdom: Animalia
- Phylum: Chordata
- Class: Amphibia
- Order: Anura
- Clade: Brachycephaloidea
- Family: Craugastoridae
- Genus: Pristimantis
- Species: P. attenboroughi

Binomial name
- Pristimantis attenboroughi Lehr and von May, 2017

= Pristimantis attenboroughi =

Species of amphibian

Pristimantis attenboroughi, also known as Attenborough's rubber frog, is a species of frog in the family Strabomantidae. It is endemic to the Peruvian Andes and has been recorded in and near the Pui–Pui Protection Forest. It is the first amphibian named after David Attenborough. It was discovered by Edgar Lehr and Rudolf von May during a period of two years of studying the forests of Peru. The species description was based on 34 specimens caught at elevations of 3,400–3,936 m (11,155–12,913 ft) above sea level.

== Description ==
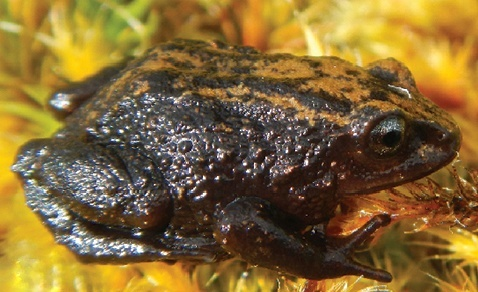
Male of Pristimantis attenboroughi (lateral view)

Adult males measure 15–19 mm (0.6–0.7 in) and adult females 19–23 mm (0.7–0.9 in) in snout–vent length. The snout is short and rounded. No tympanum is present. The finger and toe tips are narrow and rounded, without circumferential grooves; neither lateral fringes nor webbing is present. The dorsal coloration ranges from pale gray to reddish brown to brownish olive. There are scattered flecks and sometimes an X-shaped scapular mark. Most specimens have dark grayish-brown canthal and supratympanic stripes. Juveniles are paler in coloration, yellowish to reddish brown, bearing contrasting dark brown flecks and distinct canthal and supratympanic stripes.

Reproduction occurs by direct development, that is, there is no free-living tadpole stage. The average egg diameter is 3.5 mm (0.14 in).

== Habitat and conservation ==
Pristimantis attenboroughi is known from upper montane forests and high Andean grasslands at 3,400–3,936 m (11,155–12,913 ft) above sea level where specimens were found living inside moss pads. A female was found guarding a clutch of 20 eggs inside moss.

Although this species could qualify as "endangered" or "vulnerable" because of its small range, the International Union for Conservation of Nature (IUCN) assessed it in 2018 as "near threatened". The category was chosen because the overall population is believed to be stable, the species is common, and much of the known range is within a protected area.
