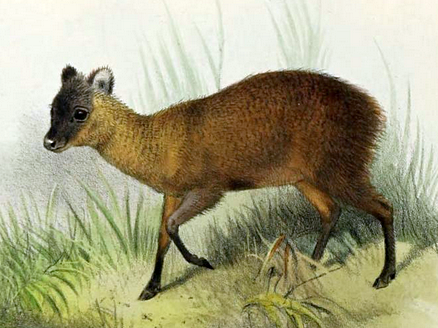
- Northern pudu (P. mephistophiles)

Conservation status
- Data Deficient (IUCN 3.1)
- CITES Appendix II (CITES)

Scientific classification
- Kingdom: Animalia
- Phylum: Chordata
- Class: Mammalia
- Order: Artiodactyla
- Family: Cervidae
- Subfamily: Capreolinae
- Genus: Pudella
- Species: P. mephistophiles

Binomial name
- Pudella mephistophiles (de Winton, 1896)
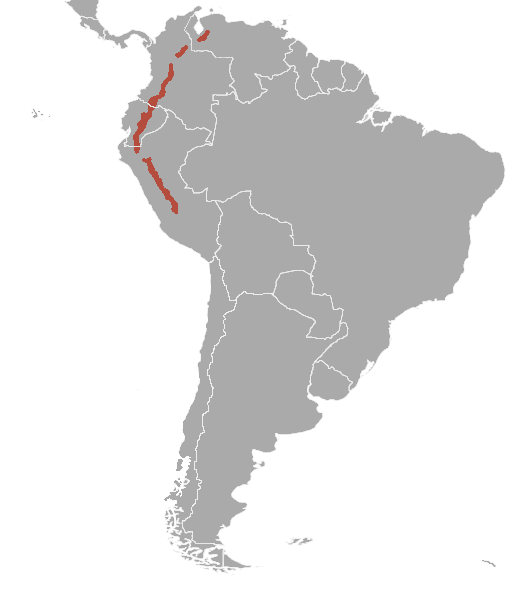
- Geographic range of Pudu mephistophiles

Synonyms
- Pudua mephistophiles de Winton, 1896

= Northern pudu =

Species of small South American deer

The northern pudu (Pudella mephistophiles, Mapudungun püdü or püdu, Spanish: pudú, Spanish pronunciation: [puˈðu]) is a species of South American deer native to the Andes of Colombia, Venezuela, Peru and Ecuador. It is the world's smallest deer and is classified as Data Deficient in the IUCN Red List. Originally classified under genus Pudu, some authorities consider it to belong to a separate genus (Pudella) from the southern pudu, along with Pudella carlae.

== Description ==
The northern pudu is the smallest species of deer in the world, standing 32 to 35 cm (13 to 14 in) tall at the shoulder and weighing 3.3 to 6 kg (7.3 to 13.2 lb). The antlers of the northern pudu grow to about 6 cm (2.4 in) long and curve backward. Its coat tends to be lighter than that of the southern pudu, but the face is darker compared to the coat.

== Range and habitat ==
The northern pudu is found at higher altitudes than its sister species, from 2,000 to 4,000 m (6,600 to 13,100 ft) above sea level. It has a discontinuous range across the Andes of Colombia, Ecuador, and Peru. It inhabits montane forests, high-elevation elfin forests, and humid alpine páramo grasslands above the tree-line. The Marañón dry forests are a gap in the species' range, separating the Ecuadorian population from the Peruvian population in the Peruvian Yungas south of the Marañón River.
