= Pudella =

Scientific classification
- Kingdom: Animalia
- Phylum: Chordata
- Class: Mammalia
- Order: Artiodactyla
- Family: Cervidae
- Subfamily: Capreolinae
- Tribe: Odocoileini
- Genus: Pudella; Thomas, 1913

Genus of mammal

Pudella is a genus of New World deer containing the following two species:

- Pudella carlae Barrio, Gutiérrez, & D'Elía, 2024
- Pudella mephistophiles (de Winton, 1896)
