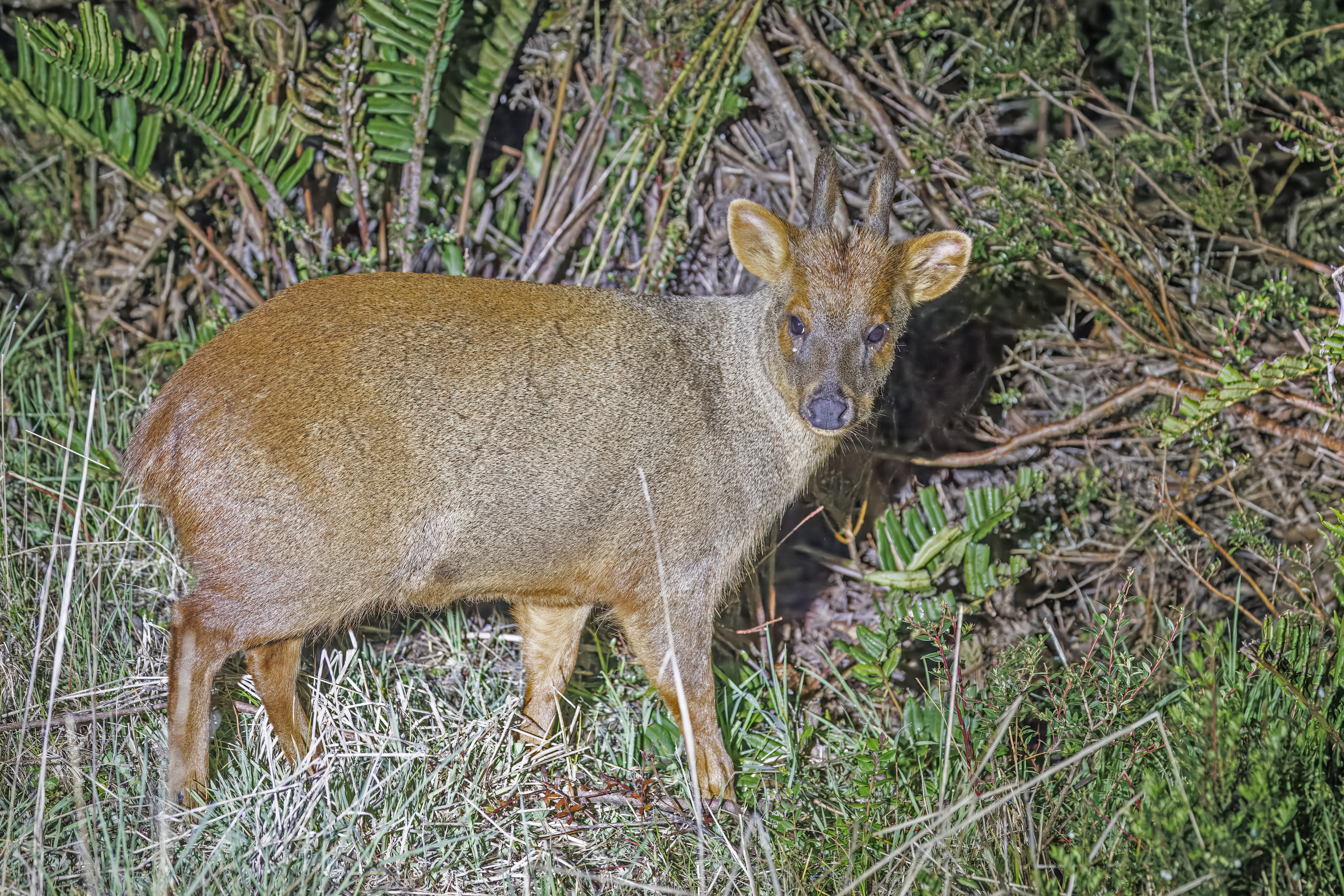
- Male
- Female both at night Chiloé Island, Chile

Conservation status
- Near Threatened (IUCN 3.1)
- CITES Appendix I

Scientific classification
- Kingdom: Animalia
- Phylum: Chordata
- Class: Mammalia
- Infraclass: Placentalia
- Order: Artiodactyla
- Family: Cervidae
- Subfamily: Capreolinae
- Genus: Pudu
- Species: P. puda

Binomial name
- Pudu puda (Molina, 1782)
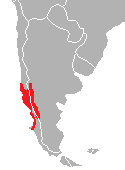
- Geographic range of Pudu puda

Synonyms
- Capra puda Molina, 1782

= Southern pudu =

Species of small South American deer

The southern pudu (Pudu puda, Mapudungun püdü or püdu, Spanish: pudú, Spanish pronunciation: [puˈðu]) is a species of South American deer native to the Valdivian temperate forests of south-central Chile and adjacent Argentina. It is classified as Near Threatened in the IUCN Red List.

== Description ==
The southern pudu is characterized by being the third smallest deer in the world. It is slightly larger than its sister species, the northern pudu and Pudella carlae, being 35 to 45 cm (14 to 18 in) tall at the shoulder and weighs 6.4 to 13.4 kg (14 to 30 lb). The antlers of the southern pudu grow to be 5.3 to 9 cm (2.1 to 3.5 in) long and tend to curve back, somewhat like a mountain goat. Its coat is a dark chestnut-brown, and tends to tuft in the front, covering the antlers.

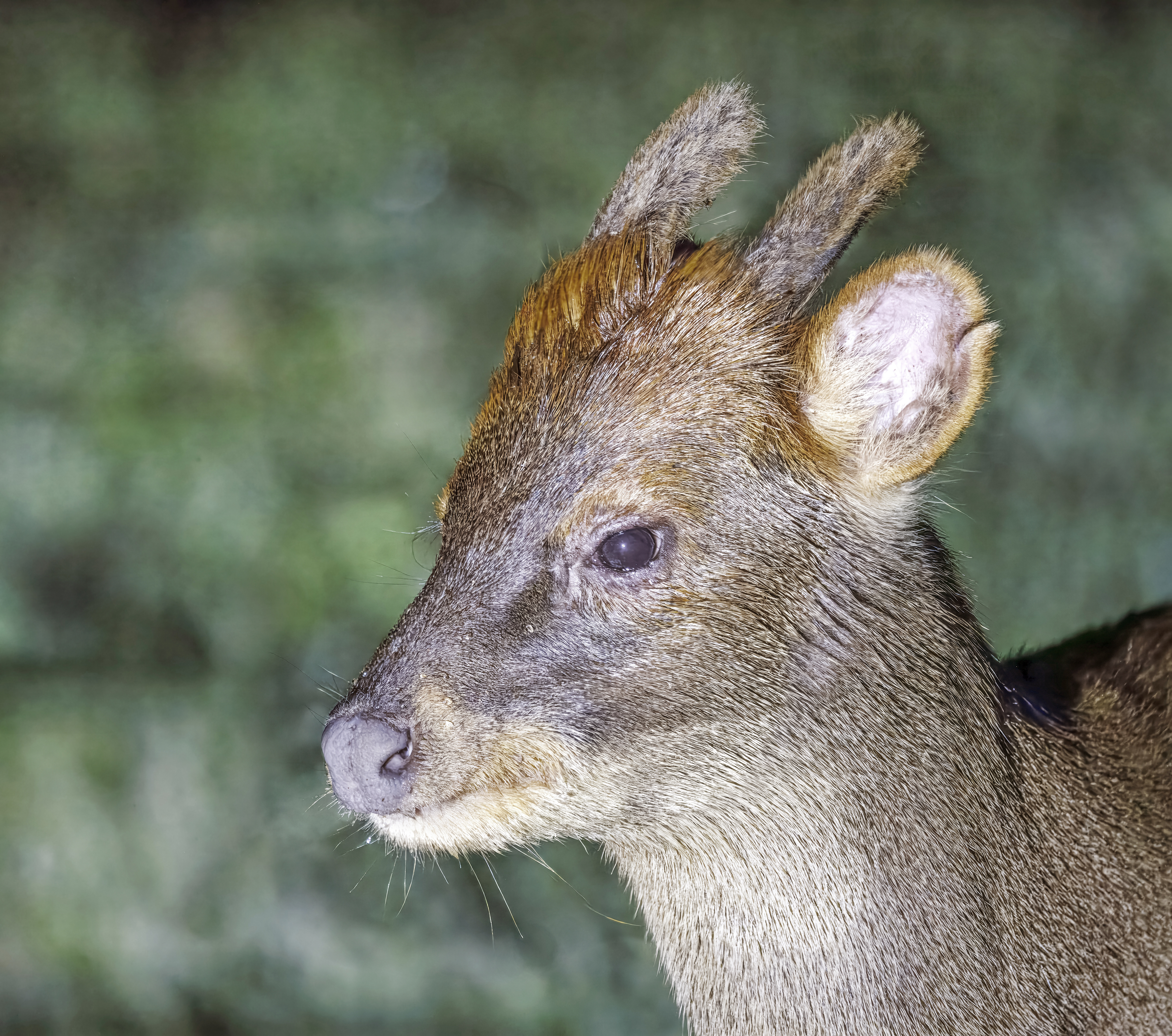
Male

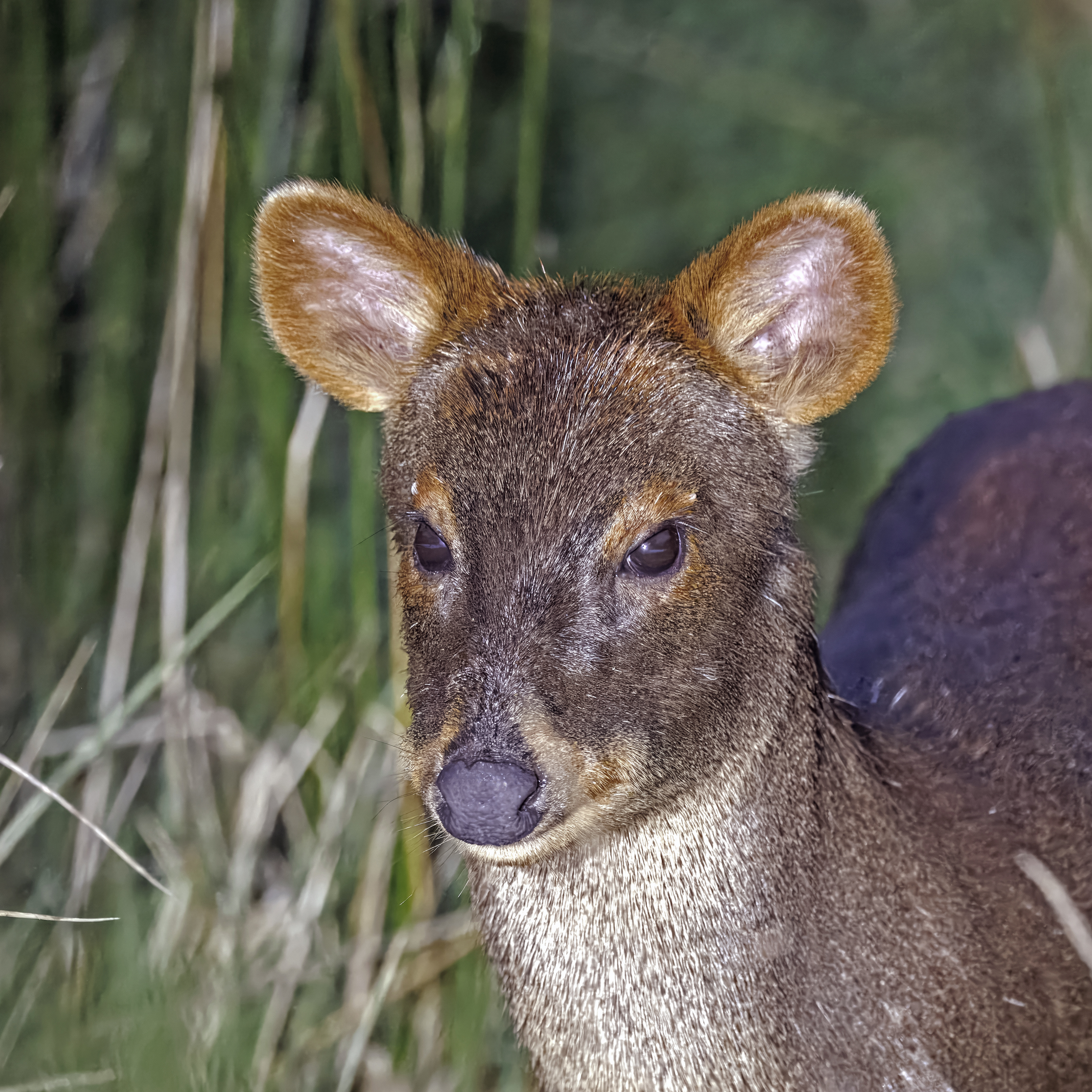
Female

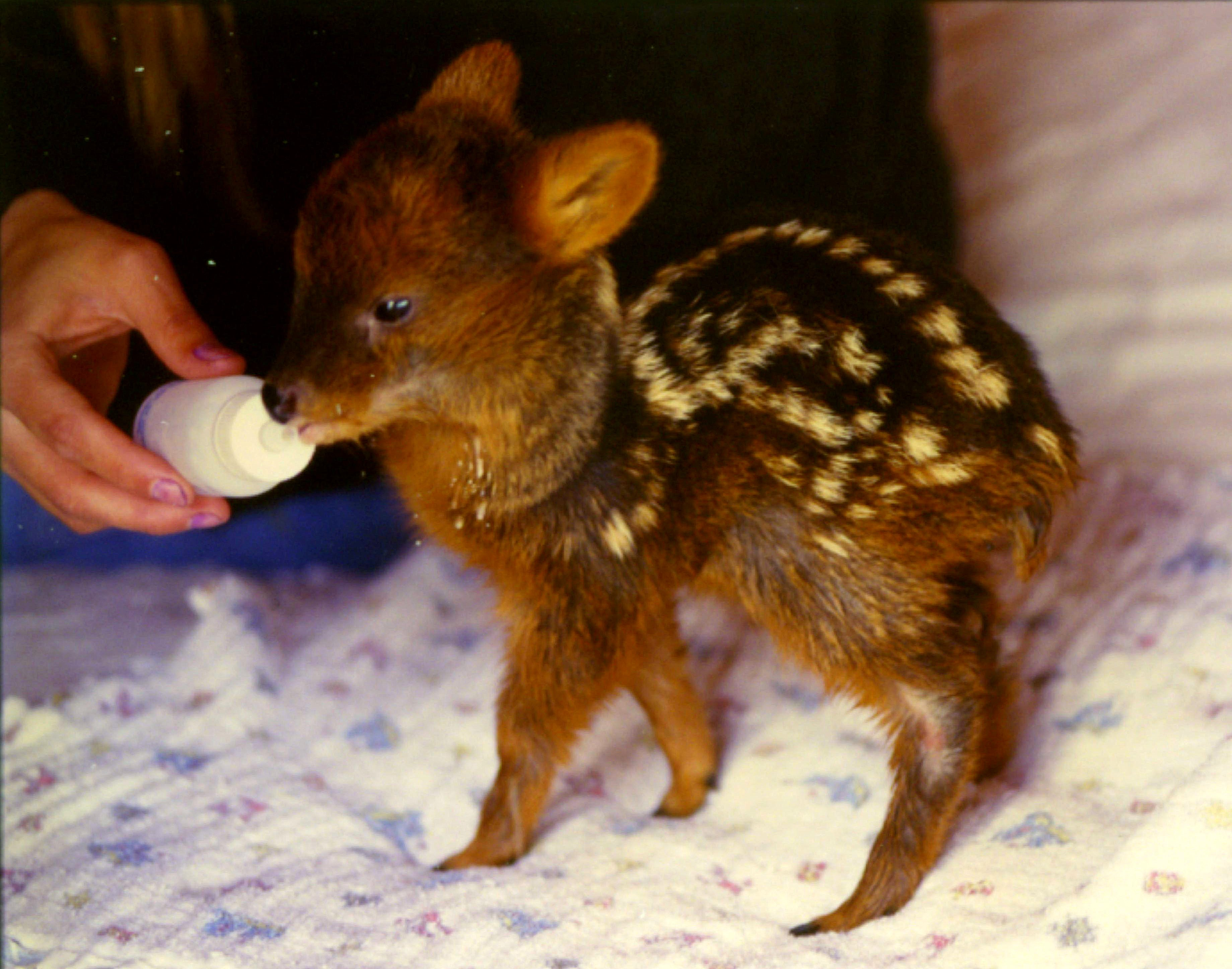
Young

== Range and habitat ==
The southern pudu lives in forests, including both mature and disturbed forests, typically with a dense understory, but it does nevertheless prefer open spaces with rich vegetation for feeding. It is found at lower elevations than its sister species, from sea level to 1,700 m (5,600 ft) elevation. In the Chilean Coast Range the pudu is found in primary and secondary broadleaf evergreen and alerce (Fitzroya cupressoides) forests, and sometimes in Eucalyptus plantations. In the southern Andes of Chile and Argentina it is associated with thickets of bamboo (Chusquea spp.) and Nothofagus dombeyi forests.

Foraging by southern pudu is thought to be detrimental for the regeneration of burned forests of Pilgerodendron uviferum.

== Genetic diversity ==
Analysis of the mtDNA control region and cytochrome b of the southern pudu across Chile revealed that different populations have marked genetic differences, with a large number of unique haplotypes in each population and few shared haplotypes between populations. This indicates that gene flow is reduced and most populations are reproductively isolated from each other. The population from Chiloé Island is estimated to have become isolated from continental populations more than 200 thousand years ago and may constitute a separate subspecies. This reproductive isolation makes each population an important evolutionary unit but also increases their vulnerability since a drastic reduction in the number of individuals would decrease genetic diversity without recovery from migrating individuals coming from neighboring areas.
