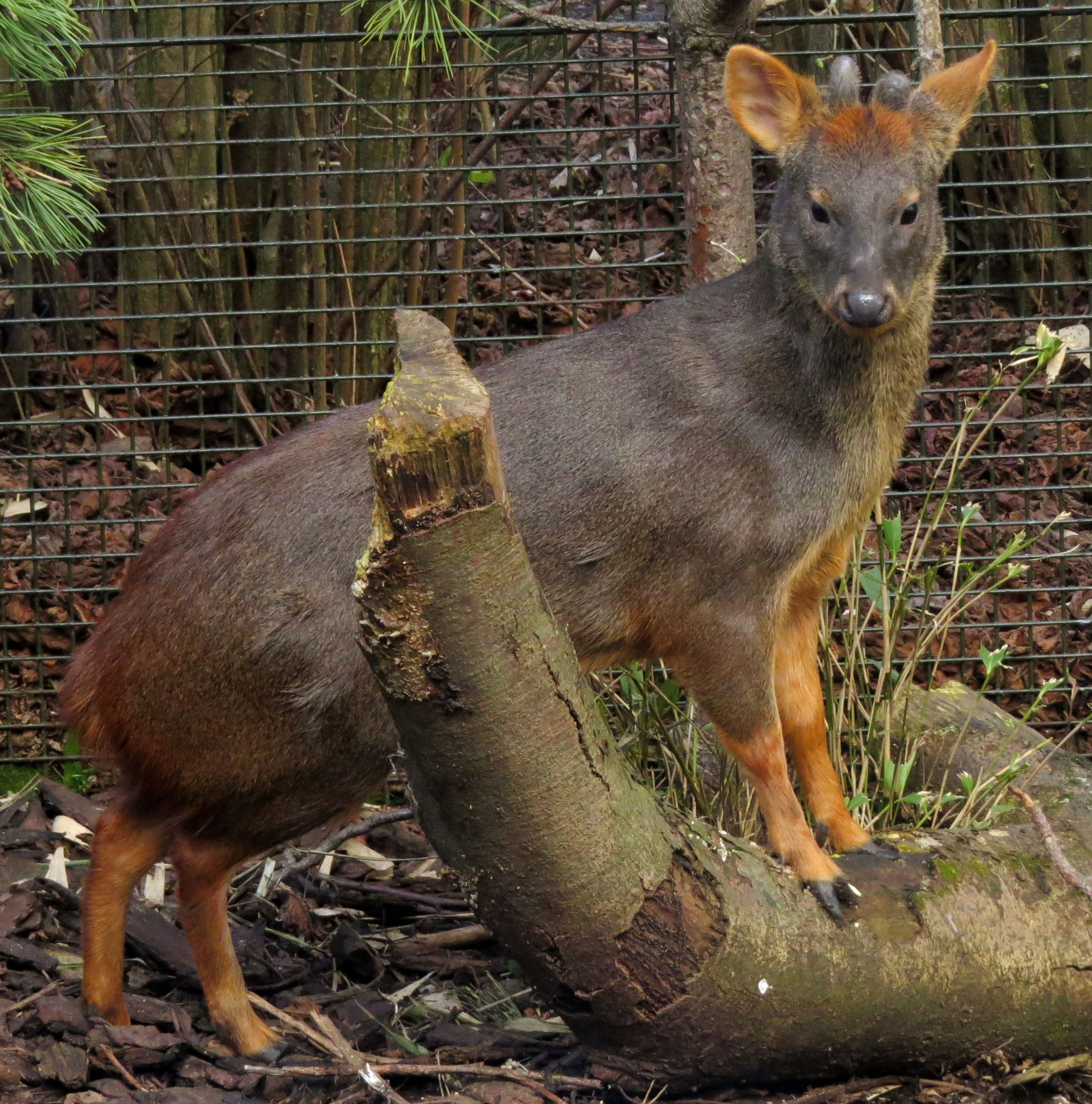
- Southern pudu (P. puda)

Scientific classification
- Kingdom: Animalia
- Phylum: Chordata
- Class: Mammalia
- Order: Artiodactyla
- Family: Cervidae
- Subfamily: Capreolinae
- Tribe: Odocoileini
- Genus: Pudu; Gray, 1852

Type species
- Capra puda Molina, 1782

Species
- Pudu puda (Molina, 1782); Pudu mephistophiles (de Winton, 1896)
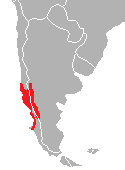
- Geographic range of Pudu puda
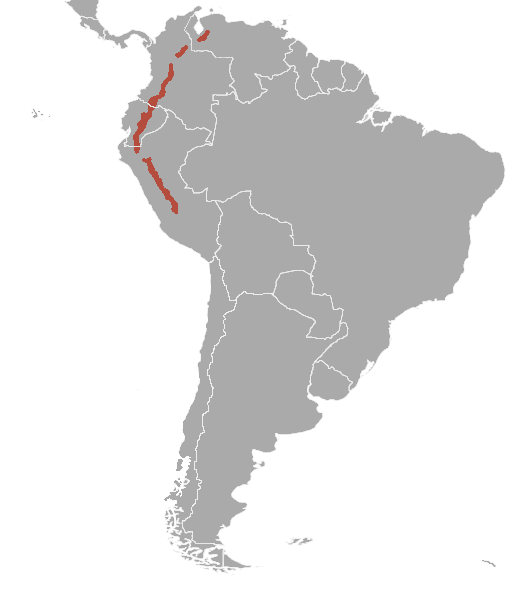
- Geographic range of Pudu mephistophiles

Synonyms
- Pudua Garrod, 1877; Pudella Thomas, 1913

= Pudu =

Pudu Temporal range: Pleistocene – recent

Genus of small South American deer

The pudus (Mapudungun püdü or püdu, Spanish: pudú, Spanish pronunciation: [puˈðu]) are two species of South American deer from the genus Pudu, and are the world's smallest deer. The chevrotains (mouse-deer; Tragulidae) are smaller, but they are not true deer. The name is a loanword from Mapudungun, the language of the indigenous Mapuche people of central Chile and south-western Argentina. The two species of pudus are the northern pudu (Pudu mephistophiles) from Venezuela, Colombia, Ecuador, and Peru, and the southern pudu (Pudu puda; sometimes incorrectly modified to Pudu pudu) from southern Chile and south-western Argentina. Pudus range in size from 32 to 44 centimeters (13 to 17 in) tall, and up to 85 centimeters (33 in) long. The southern pudu is classified as near threatened, while the northern pudu is classified as Data Deficient in the IUCN Red List.

== Taxonomy ==
The genus Pudu was first erected by English naturalist John Edward Gray in 1850. Pudua was a Latinized version of the name proposed by Alfred Henry Garrod in 1877, but was ruled invalid. Pudus are classified in the New World deer subfamily Capreolinae within the deer family Cervidae. The term "pudú" itself is derived from the language of the Mapuche people of the Los Lagos Region of south-central Chile. Because they live on the slopes of the Andes Mountain Range, they are also known as the "Chilean mountain goat".

Two similar species of pudús are recognised:

Genus Pudu – Gray, 1852 – two species
Common name	Scientific name and subspecies	Range	Size and ecology	IUCN status and estimated population
Southern pudú	Pudu puda (Molina, 1782)	Southern Andes of Chile and Argentina	Size: Slightly larger than its sister species, being 35 to 45 cm (14 to 18 in) tall at the shoulder and weighing 6.4 to 13.4 kg (14 to 30 lb). The antlers of the southern pudú grow to be 5.3 to 9 cm (2.1 to 3.5 in) long and tend to curve back, somewhat like a mountain goat. Its coat is a dark chestnut-brown, and tends to tuft in the front, covering the antlers. Habitat: It is found at lower elevations than its sister species, from sea level to 2,000 m (6,600 ft). Diet:	LC Decreasing
Northern pudú	Pudu mephistophiles (de Winton, 1896)	Andes of Colombia, Venezuela, Peru, and Ecuador	Size: The smallest species of deer in the world, being 32 to 35 cm (13 to 14 in) tall at the shoulder and weighs 3.3 to 6 kg (7.3 to 13.2 lb). The antlers of the northern pudú grow to about 6 cm (2.4 in) long, also curving backward. Its coat tends to be lighter than that of the southern pudú, but the face is darker compared to the coat. Habitat: It is found at higher altitudes than its sister species, from 2,000 to 4,000 m (6,600 to 13,100 ft) above sea level. Diet:	DD Decreasing

== Description ==
The pudus are the world's smallest deer, with the southern pudu being slightly larger than the northern pudu. It has a stocky frame supported by short and slender legs. It is 32 to 44 cm (13 to 17 in) high at the shoulder and up to 85 cm (33 in) in length. Pudus normally weigh up to 12 kg (26 lb), but the highest recorded weight of a pudu is 13.4 kg (30 lb). Pudus have small, black eyes, black noses, and rounded ears with lengths of 7.5 to 8 cm (3.0 to 3.1 in). Sexual dimorphism in the species includes an absence of antlers in females. Males have short, spiked antlers that are not forked, as seen in most species of deer. The antlers, which are shed annually, can extend from 6.5 to 7.5 cm (2.6 to 3.0 in) in length and protrude from between the ears. Also on the head are large preorbital glands. Pudus have small hooves, dewclaws, and short tails about 4.0 to 4.5 cm (1.6 to 1.8 in) in length when measured without hair. Coat coloration varies with season, sex, and individual genes. The fur is long and stiff, typically pressed close to the body, with a reddish-brown to dark-brown hue. The neck and shoulders of an aged pudu turn a dark gray-brown in the winter.

== Habitat and distribution ==
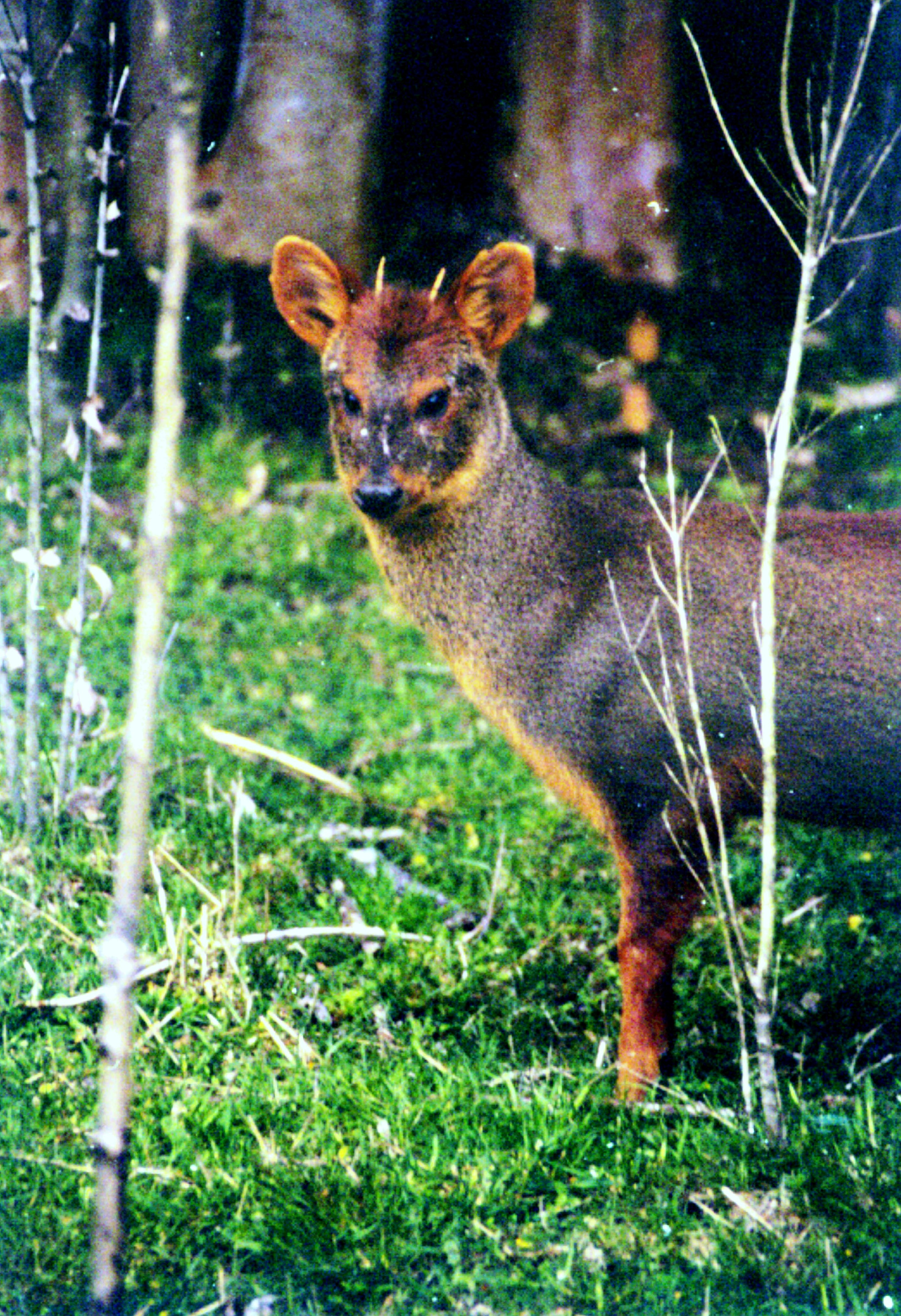
Male southern pudú; Los Lagos Region

The pudú inhabits temperate rainforests in South America, where the dense underbrush and bamboo thickets offer protection from predators. Southern Chile, south-west Argentina, Chiloé Island, and northwest South America are home to the deer. The northern pudú is found in the northern Andes of Colombia, Venezuela, Ecuador, and Peru, from 2,000 to 4,000 m (6,600 to 13,100 ft) above sea level. The southern species is found in the slope of the southern Andes from sea level to 2,000 m (6,600 ft).

The climate of the pudú's habitat is composed of two main seasons: a damp, moderate winter and an arid summer. Annual precipitation in these areas of Argentina and Chile ranges from 2 to 4 m (6.6 to 13.1 ft).

== Behavior ==
=== Social ===
The pudú is a solitary animal whose behavior in the wild is largely unknown because of its secretive nature. Pudús are crepuscular, most active in the morning, late afternoon, and evening. Their home range generally extends about 16 to 25 ha (40 to 62 acres), much of which consists of crisscrossing pudú-trodden paths. Each pudú has its own home range, or territory. A single animal's territory is marked with sizable dung piles found on paths and near eating and resting areas. Large facial glands for scent communication allow correspondence with other pudú deer. Pudús do not interact socially, other than to mate. An easily frightened animal, the deer barks when in fear. Its fur bristles and the pudú shivers when angered.

Predators of the pudús include the horned owl, Andean fox, Magellan fox, cougar, and smaller cats. The pudú is a wary animal that moves slowly and stops often, smelling the air for scents of predators. Being a proficient climber, jumper, and sprinter, the deer flees in a zigzag path when being pursued. The lifespan of the pudús ranges from 8 to 10 years in the wild. The longest recorded lifespan is 15 years and 9 months. However, such longevity is rare and most pudús die at a much younger age, from a wide range of causes. Maternal neglect of newborns, as well as a wide range of diseases, can decrease the population. A popular rumor is that if alarmed to a high degree, pudús die from fear-induced cardiac complications.

=== Diet ===
The pudús are herbivorous, consuming vines, leaves from low trees, shrubs, succulent sprouts, herbs, ferns, blossoms, buds, tree bark, and fallen fruit. They can survive without drinking water for long periods due to the high water content of the succulent foliage in their diets.

Pudús have various methods of obtaining the foliage they need. Their small stature and cautious nature create obstacles in attaining food. They stop often while searching for food to stand on their hind legs and smell the wind, detecting food scents. Females and fawns peel bark from saplings using their teeth, but mature males may use their spikelike antlers. The deer may use their front legs to press down on saplings until they snap or become low enough to the ground so they can reach the leaves. Forced to stand on their hind legs due to their small size, the deer climb branches and tree stumps to reach higher foliage. They bend bamboo shoots horizontally in order to walk on them and eat from higher branches.

=== Reproduction ===
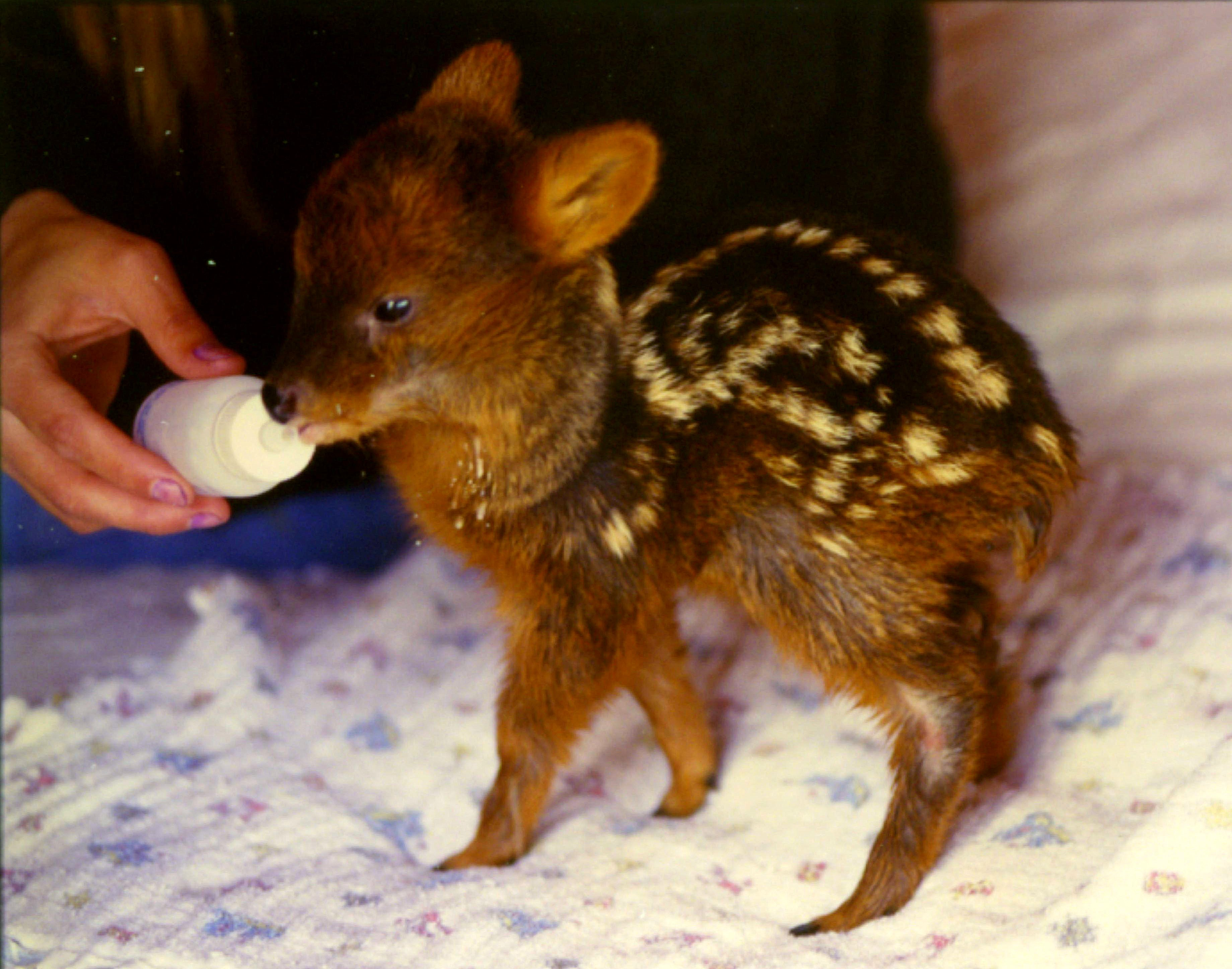
Pudú fawn at a rehabilitation center, Llanquihue Province

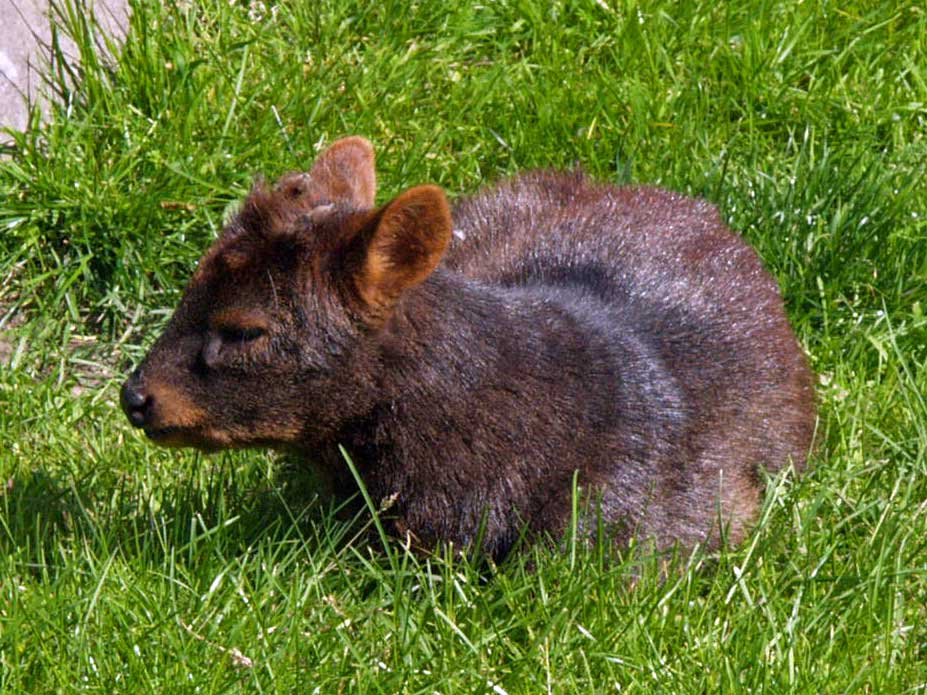
Small pudú

Pudús are solitary and only come together for rut. Mating season is in the Southern Hemisphere autumn, from April to May. Pudú DNA is arranged into 70 chromosomes. To mate, the pudú male rests his chin on the female's back, then sniffs her rear before mounting her from behind, holding her with his fore legs. The gestation period ranges from 202 to 223 days (around 7 months) with the average being 210 days. A single offspring or sometimes twins are born in austral spring, from November to January. Newborns weigh 700 to 1,000 g (25 to 35 oz) with the average birth weight being 890 g (31 oz). Newborns less than 600 g (21 oz) or more than 1,000 g (35 oz) die. Females and males weigh the same at birth. Fawns have reddish-brown fur and southern pudú fawns have white spots running the length of their backs. Young are weaned after 2 months. Females mature sexually in 6 months, while males mature in 8–12 months. Fawns are fully grown in 3 months, but may stay with their mothers for 8 to 12 months.

== Status and conservation ==
The southern pudu is currently listed as near threatened on the IUCN Red List, mainly because of overhunting and habitat loss, while the northern pudu is currently classified as being 'Data deficient'. Pudu puda is listed in CITES Appendix I, and Pudu mephistophiles is listed in CITES Appendix II. The southern species is more easily maintained in captivity than the northern, though small populations of the northern formerly existed in zoos. As of 2010, more than 100 southern pudús are kept at Species360-registered institutions with the vast majority in European and US zoos. Pudús are difficult to transport because they are easily overheated and stressed. Pudús are protected in various national parks; parks require resources to enforce protection of the deer.

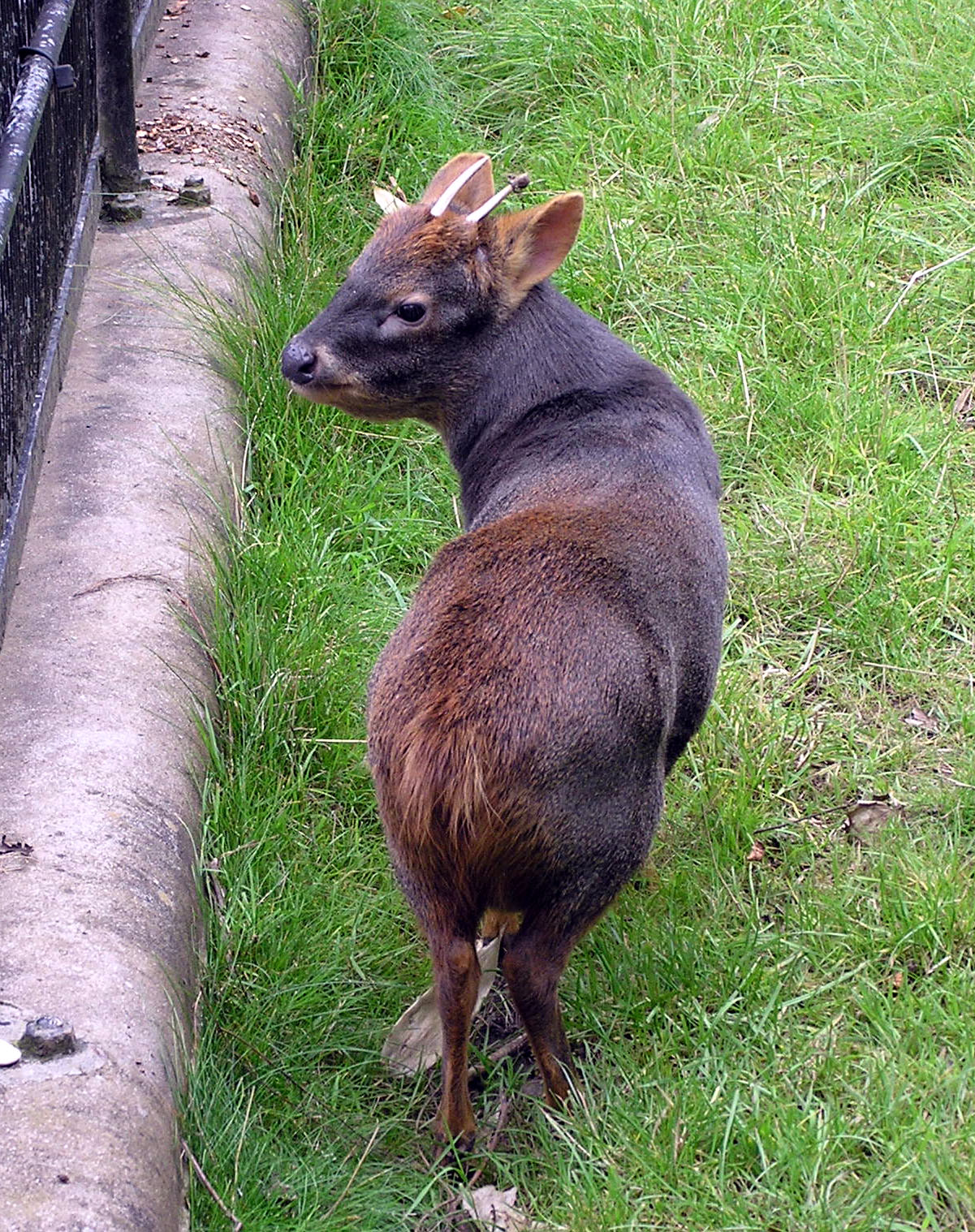
Southern pudú in captivity at Bristol Zoo

Efforts to preserve the pudú species are being taken in order to prevent extinction. An international captive-breeding program for the southern pudú led by Universidad de Concepcion in Chile has been started. Some deer have been bred in captivity and reintroduced into Nahuel Huapi National Park in Argentina. Reintroduction efforts include the use of radio collars for tracking. The Convention on International Trade in Endangered Species has banned the international trading of pudús. The Wildlife Conservation Society protects their natural habitat and works to recreate it for pudús in captivity. Despite efforts made by the World Wildlife Fund, the size of the pudú population remains unknown. Threats to the pudús remain despite various conservation efforts.

=== Threats ===
Pudús are threatened due to the destruction of their rainforest habitat. The land is cleared for human development, cattle ranching, agriculture, logging, and exotic tree plantations. Habitat fragmentation and road accidents cause pudú deaths. They are taken from the wild as pets, as well as exported illegally. They are overhunted and killed for food by specially trained hunting dogs. The recently introduced red deer compete with pudús for food. Domestic dogs prey upon pudús and transfer parasites through contact. Pudús are very susceptible to diseases such as bladder worms, lungworms, roundworms, and heartworms.
