= Pastaza–Morona–Marañon National Forest =

- Location: Peru
- Area: 3,750 km^{2} (1,450 sq mi)
- Established: 1963

Pastaza–Morona–Marañon National Forest in Peru was established by RS Number 442 in 1963 and covers an area of 3,750 km^{2} (1,450 sq mi).

The area has no administration and has serious problems. Inside the forest are 6 native communities of Candoshi people.
