= Cerros de Amotape National Park =

National park of Peru

- Parque Nacional Cerros de Amotape
- IUCN category II (national park)
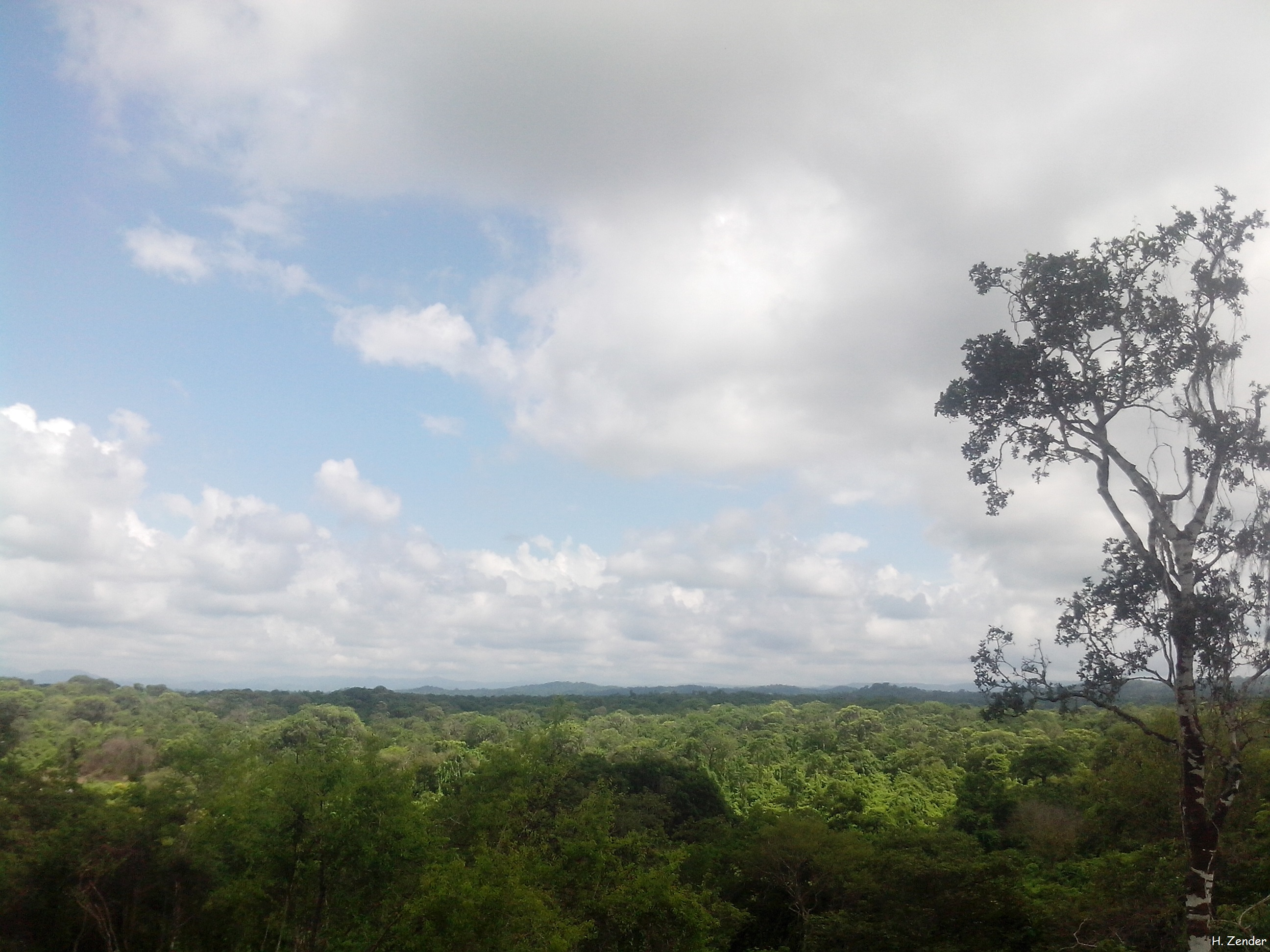
- Tropical dry forest in the region of Tumbes during rainy season.

- Location within Peru
- Interactive map of Cerros de Amotape National Park
- Location: Peru; Regions of Piura and Tumbes
- Nearest city: Tumbes
- Coordinates: 4.097°S 80.57°W
- Area: 151,561 ha (585.18 sq mi)
- Established: July 22, 1975
- Governing body: SERNANP
- Website: Parque Nacional Cerros de Amotape

Cerros de Amotape National Park (Spanish: Parque Nacional Cerros de Amotape) is a protected area located in the regions of Piura and Tumbes in northern Peru.

== History ==
The national park was officially established on July 22, 1975.

== Geography ==
Cerros de Amotape National Park is located in the provinces of Tumbes and Contralmirante Villar in the region of Tumbes and the province of Sullana in the region of Piura. It has an area of 151,561.27 hectares (1,515.61 km^{2}) which includes the mountain range called Cordillera de los Amotapes and the Tumbes River, the only navigable river on the Peruvian coast. The park has an elevational range between 120 m and 1538 m.

== Climate ==
In the area, the rainy season spans from December to April, being the southern and western areas of the park the ones that receive less rain. Mean annual temperatures are in the range of 23° to 26 °C, with a mean annual precipitation of 500 mm in the tropical dry forest zone and 1450 mm in the Pacific tropical forest zone.

== Ecology ==
The park protects a portion of the Tumbes–Piura dry forests ecoregion and the southern reaches of the Pacific Tropical Forest.

=== Flora ===
Among the trees found in this area are: Ceiba trischistandra, Prosopis pallida, Albizia multiflora, Cedrela sp., Ziziphus thyrsiflora, Handroanthus billbergii, Handroanthus chrysanthus, Loxopterygium huasango, Bursera graveolens, etc.

=== Fauna ===
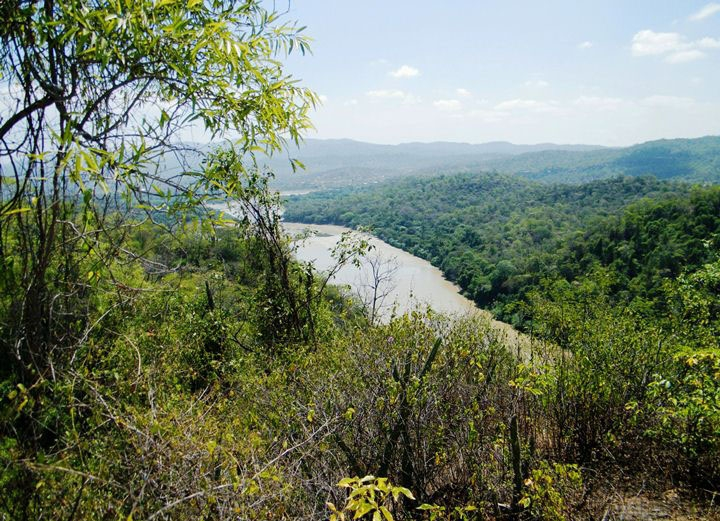
Tumbes River, inside Cerros de Amotape National Park.

Some of the mammals found in this area are: the red brocket, the Guayaquil squirrel, the neotropical otter, the white-tailed deer, the mantled howler, the white-fronted capuchin, the ocelot and the jaguar.

A total of 111 bird species have been registered in the park, some of them are: the grey-backed hawk, the grey-cheeked parakeet, the blackish-headed spinetail and the slaty becard.

The park is home to the endangered American crocodile.

== Activities ==
Hiking can be done in the park, especially in the buffer zone; there's the possibility to rent mules for longer routes inside the park. Canoeing can be done in the Tumbes river. Nature watching and research are other important activities in the park.

The park's checkpoints can be used as places to stay overnight.

At the zone of El Caucho, in the tropical forest zone, there are research facilities that can be visited.

== Environmental issues ==
The main threats to biodiversity inside the park are: livestock grazing, wood extraction (for construction and charcoal), extraction of honey from wild honeybees, hunting, overfishing in the Tumbes river, pollution of rivers, garbage left by tourists and introduction of exotic plant species.
