= Algarrobal El Moro Reserved Zone =

Protected area of Peru

The Algarrobal El Moro Reserved Zone is a protected area in Peru. Its purpose is to protect the natural forests of carobs and their associated fauna, as well as the archaeological sites of the cultures Chimú and Moche.
