= Mariscal Cáceres National Forest =

National forest in Peru

- Location: Mariscal Cáceres Province, Peru

The Mariscal Caceres National Forest (Spanish mariscal marshal) is situated in the Mariscal Cáceres Province of Peru.

It is subject to deforestation. A 1995 projection was that 2.17% of the area was deforested and by 2000 2.55% would be.
