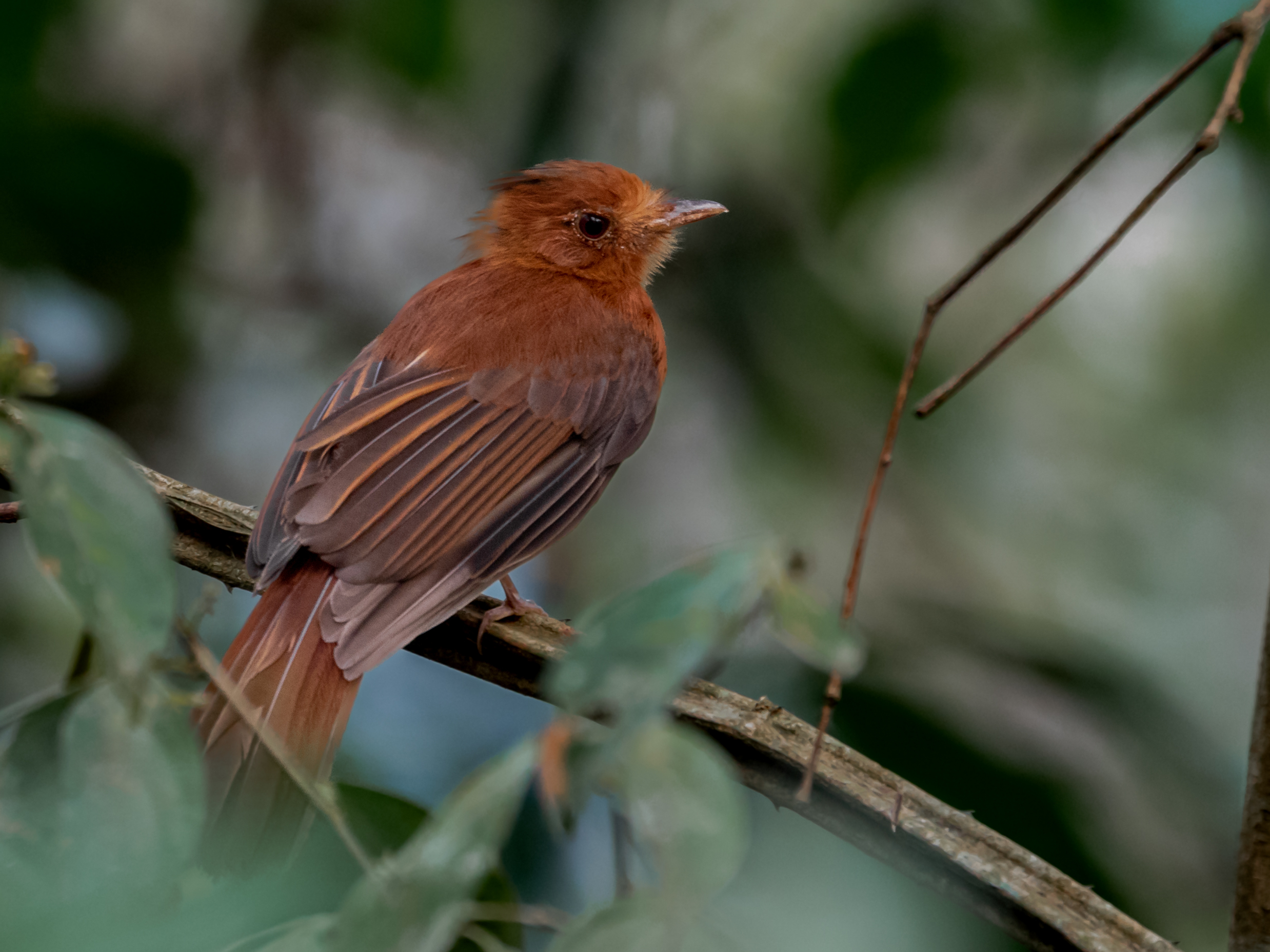

Conservation status
- Vulnerable (IUCN 3.1)

Scientific classification
- Kingdom: Animalia
- Phylum: Chordata
- Class: Aves
- Order: Passeriformes
- Family: Tyrannidae
- Genus: Cnipodectes
- Species: C. superrufus

Binomial name
- Cnipodectes superrufus Lane, Servat, Valqui & Lambert, 2007

= Rufous twistwing =

Species of bird

The rufous twistwing (Cnipodectes superrufus) is a species of bird in the family Tyrannidae, the tyrant flycatchers. It is found in Brazil, Bolivia, and Peru.

== Taxonomy and systematics ==
The brownish twistwing was described as a new species in 2007. What became the type specimen had been collected in 1990 but misidentified as a rufous casiornis (Casiornis rufus), to which it bears a striking resemblance. Other specimens were collected in the late 1990s. They were first identified as belonging to a separate species in 2002. While the authors of the 2007 announcement were drafting it the species was observed, collected, and video and audio recorded in the vicinity of the type specimen and elsewhere. The authors assigned the species to genus Cnipodectes especially on the basis of its modified outer primaries that have stiff twisted shafts. This characteristic is shared only with the other species in the genus, the brownish twistwing (C. subbrunneus). The authors assigned its English name, its Spanish name "alitorcido rufo", and its specific epithet superrufus in reference "to the most striking feature of this new species, its rich rufous coloration".

The rufous twistwing is monotypic.

== Description ==
The rufous twistwing is 18 to 24 cm (7.1 to 9.4 in) long. Males weigh about 30 to 40 g (1.1 to 1.4 oz) and females about 22 to 26 g (0.78 to 0.92 oz). Adult males are mostly bright rufous and have rather shaggy plumage. They have elongated crown feathers that form a crest, though it is usually held flat. They have grayish lores and prominent rictal bristles. Their wings are somewhat duskier than their back. Their outer primaries have the stiff twisted shafts that give the species its English name. Their chin and belly are somewhat brighter than the back. Females do not have the modified primaries but except for that and size are like males. Both sexes have a red iris, a wide bill with a grayish to brown maxilla and pink mandible, and gray legs and feet.

== Distribution and habitat ==
At the time of its formal description the rufous twistwing was positively known only from southeastern Peru's departments of Madre de Dios, Cuzco, and Ucayali and also far northern Bolivia's Pando Department. The authors also noted unconfirmed records from far western Brazil's Acre state. It has since been confirmed in all three countries. Most of the known locations are in Madre de Dios. Other extensive areas with much bamboo are outside the species' known range and authors consider it likely that the species has a larger range than is currently known.

The rufous twistwing inhabits lowland Amazonian forest, both floodplain and terra firme, and is almost entirely found in or next to dense Guadua bamboo. It has also been found in secondary forest near bamboo stands. It occurs below 500 m (1,600 ft) of elevation.

== Behavior ==
=== Movement ===
The rufous twistwing is believed to be a year-round resident.

=== Flight style ===
One publication has described the rufous twistwing's flight between perches as "erratic with slightly floppy and irregular downbeats" but more direct when crossing open spaces.

=== Feeding ===
The rufous twistwing feeds on arthropods, though details are lacking. Foraging observations appear to be of individual birds. It tends to be sedentary, but when perched often slowly lifts one wing behind its back. It forages within about 1 and 3 m (3 and 10 ft) above the ground, making short up, down, and level sallies to grab prey from leaves and branches.

=== Breeding ===
The rufous twistwing's breeding biology is essentially unknown. Its nest is assumed to be similar to that of its congener the brownish twistwing. That species' nest is a closed cylinder up to about 1 m (3 ft) long with a side entrance that hangs from a branch or aerial root. It is made from plant fibers and often has some straggling from the bottom. There is some evidence that the species might be polygynous and display at leks.

=== Vocal and non-vocal sounds ===
As of early 2025 xeno-canto had 27 recordings of rufous twistwing vocalizations; both songs and calls were represented. It also had one of wing noises, and one of the vocalization recordings also included wing noises. Tobais et al identified three vocalizations. Number 1, the "agitation call" is a "loud, non-stereotyped, scolding series" of two to 14 notes and is sometimes preceded by "one or two loud pyew calls" that Tobias et al call Number 3. Number two is the species' song, "a loud chiming series of 5–7 evenly paced notes, descending in pitch, with the first note more disyllabic, ringing and prolonged than subsequent notes". The rufous twistwing's modified primaries make "mechanical wing rattles" during flight. It was first recorded in 2009 with vocalizations.

== Status ==
The IUCN has assessed the rufous twistwing as Vulnerable. Though it apparently has a large range, its known distribution within it is patchy with up to 100 subpopulations. Its estimated population of 2500 to 10,000 mature individuals is believed to be increasing. Its bamboo habitat "is threatened within the species range by development projects such as the Trans Oceanica Highway and the available area of mature bamboo stands is likely to decrease. The highway's construction is likely to open the region to further deforestation for cattle ranching and biofuels in the future". The IUCN estimates its total extent of occurrence at 309,000 km^{2} (119,000 sq mi) though Tobias et al estimate it only inhabits about 89,000 km^{2} (34,000 sq mi) within its overall range. It is considered rare in Peru. It occurs in Peru's Manu National Park and Tambopata National Reserve.
