= Pui Pui Protection Forest =

Protected area in Peru

- Bosque de Protección Pui Pui
- IUCN category VI (protected area with sustainable use of natural resources)
- Location within Peru
- Location: Peru; Junín
- Coordinates: 11°16′03″S 75°04′14″W
- Area: 230 sq mi (600 km^{2})
- Established: January 31, 1985
- Governing body: SERNANP
- Website: Bosque de Protección Pui Pui

High-altitude landscapes and natural habitats in and around Pui Pui Protection Forest, Junín, Peru.

Pui Pui Protection Forest is a protected area in Junín, Peru, established on 31 January 1985. It covers an extension of 60,000 hectares (230 mi^{2}).

== See also ==
- Pristimantis ashaninka
