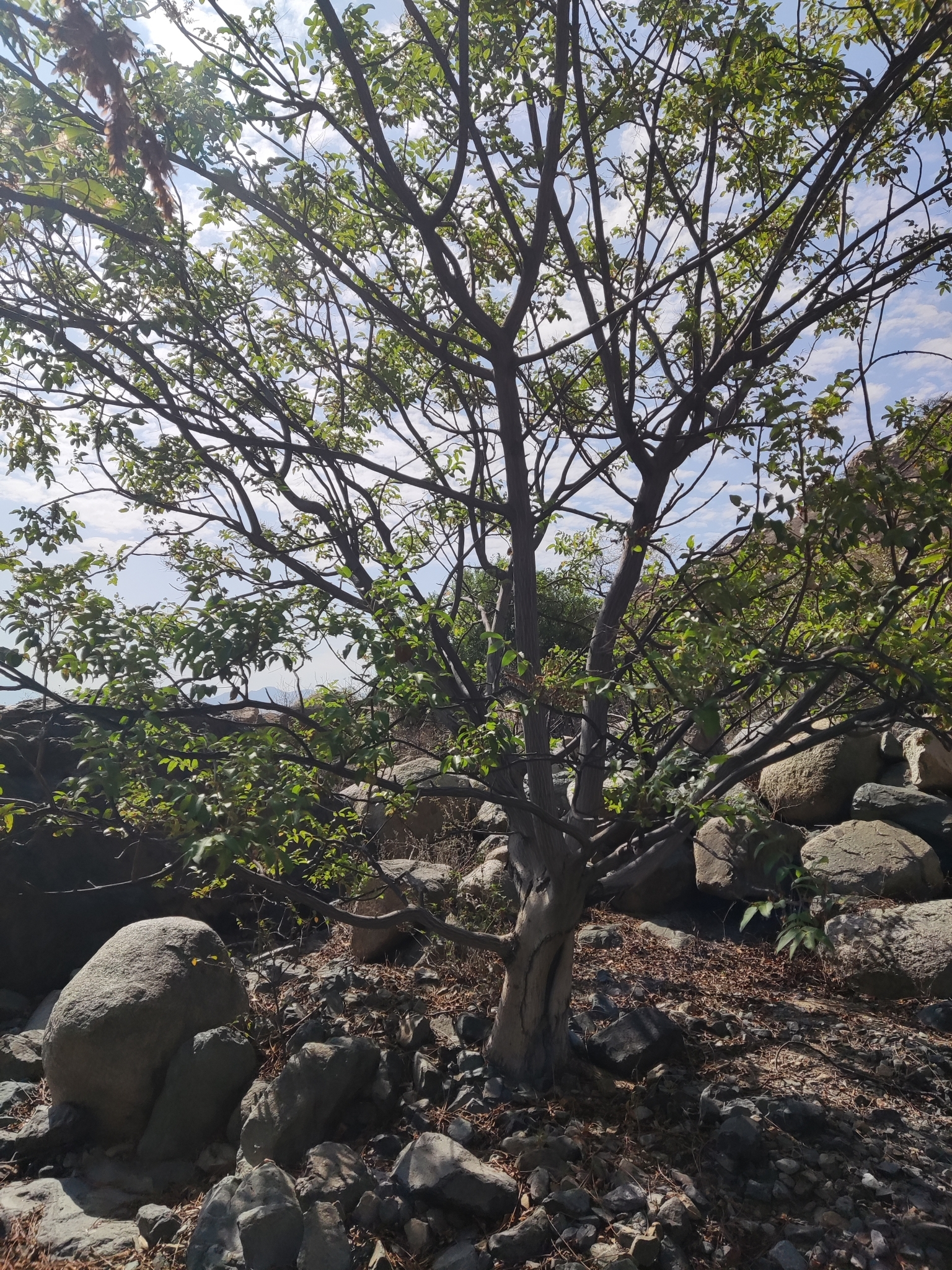
- Loxopterygium huasango

Scientific classification
- Kingdom: Plantae
- Clade: Tracheophytes
- Clade: Angiosperms
- Clade: Eudicots
- Clade: Rosids
- Order: Sapindales
- Family: Anacardiaceae
- Subfamily: Anacardioideae
- Genus: Loxopterygium; Hook.f.

Synonyms
- Apterokarpos Rizzini

= Loxopterygium =

Genus of flowering plants

Loxopterygium is a genus of plants in the family Anacardiaceae.

== Taxonomy ==
=== Species ===
As of August 2021, Plants of the World online has 4 accepted species:

- Loxopterygium gardneri Engl.
- Loxopterygium grisebachii, Hieron. & Lorentz ex Griseb.
- Loxopterygium huasango Spruce ex Engl.
- Loxopterygium sagotii Hook.f.
