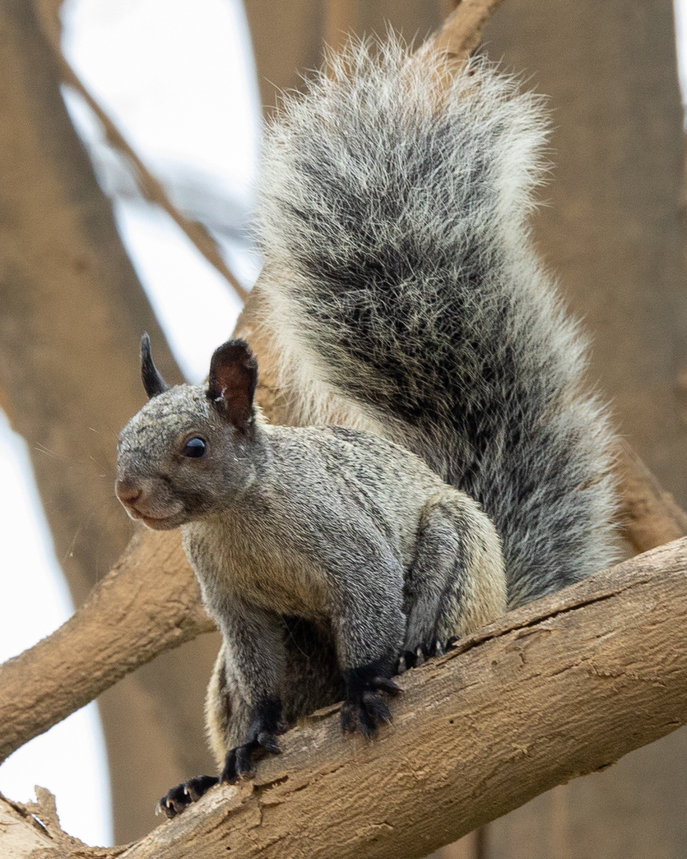

Conservation status
- Least Concern (IUCN 3.1)

Scientific classification
- Kingdom: Animalia
- Phylum: Chordata
- Class: Mammalia
- Order: Rodentia
- Family: Sciuridae
- Genus: Sciurus
- Species: S. stramineus

Binomial name
- Sciurus stramineus Eydoux & Souleyet, 1841
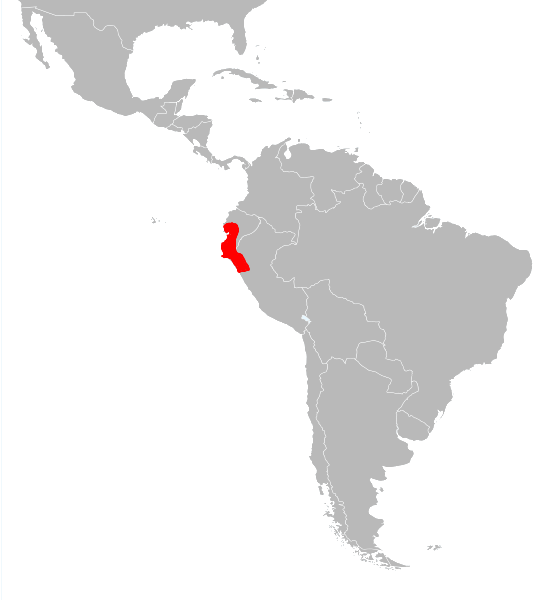
- Guayaquil Squirrel's range

= Guayaquil squirrel =

Species of rodent

The Guayaquil squirrel (Sciurus stramineus) is a tree squirrel endemic to Ecuador and Peru. It is a robust squirrel with a head-and-body length of 18 to 32 cm (7 to 13 in) and a similar length tail. The colour is variable; in Peru, a pale morph is more common, while in Ecuador, most individuals have darker grey fur on the forequarters, dull orange hindquarters. A melanistic morph is sometimes seen. It lives largely in trees and is diurnal, feeding on seeds, flowers, and other plant material, fungi and some insects. These squirrels are also found in urban areas, living in close proximity to humans, and may be vectors for leptospirosis and Chagas disease. This squirrel faces no particular threats, has a wide range and is relatively common, and the International Union for Conservation of Nature has rated it as being of "least concern".

== Description ==
Guayaquil squirrels are relatively heavily built squirrels, weighing around 470 grams (17 oz). They measure from 18 to 32 centimetres (7.1 to 12.6 in) in head-body length, and have a long tail, measuring 25 to 33 centimetres (9.8 to 13.0 in), in proportion to their body. The scientific name means "straw-coloured squirrel", but, in fact, their colour is highly variable. Past attempts to identify different subspecies on the basis of coat colour are, however, no longer recognised, since there was no clear distinction between them.

There are at least two morphs. The paler morph, which is more common in Peru, has pale grey fur grizzled with white over most of the body, a buff rump, a white or pale yellow patch on the back of the neck, and grey underparts. The darker morph, which is more common in the Ecuadorian lowlands, has grey fur on the forequarters, dull orange hindquarters, grizzled black and white shoulders, and grey underparts. However, even these two morphs are highly variable, with the patches on the shoulders or rump being absent, or the underparts being tawny or even reddish, in some individuals. A third, rarer, melanistic morph has also been reported, with black fur covering almost the entire body, except for a white patch on the collar, and occasional white spots on the back.

All morphs have black ears and a slender grey tail. The latter feature can be used to distinguish this species from the only other Ecuadorian tree-squirrel, the red-tailed squirrel.

== Distribution and habitat ==
Guayaquil squirrels are found in the wild only in southwestern Ecuador and northwestern Peru. A small population has also been introduced to parks in Lima. They inhabit a range of forest types, from dry to humid, along the western slopes of the Andes between 300 and 2,000 metres (980 and 6,560 ft) in elevation. They have also been reported from coffee plantations. There are no currently recognised subspecies.

== Behaviour and biology ==
Like other squirrels, the Guayaquil squirrel feeds primarily on seeds, although it also eats flowers, mushrooms, and other plant material, and some insects. They are adaptable, and able to survive in cities, and also breed well in captivity. They are diurnal and arboreal, spending most of their lives in the trees. They construct nests about 30 centimetres (12 in) across from woven sticks, in tree branches over 5 metres (16 ft) above the ground. They live for up to seven years in captivity.
