= List of national parks of Peru =

Peru has 15 national parks, which are designated protected areas operated by the National Service of Natural Protected Areas, an agency of the Ministry of Environment (Peru). National parks are areas established by law to preserve one or more representative ecosystems in their natural state, safeguarding associated wildlife, cultural features, and scenic values. Human activities are restricted to indirect uses: scientific research and regulated tourism in designated zones.

== National parks ==
Legend

† Blue – UNESCO Biosphere Reserve
‡ Purple – Park designated as both a World Heritage Site and Biosphere Reserve

National Parks of Peru
| Name | Photo | Location (region) | Established | Area (2025) | Annual visitors (2024) | Description |
|---|---|---|---|---|---|---|
| Cutervo National Park | | Cajamarca; 6°12′7″S 78°47′18″W | 20 September 1961 | 8,214.23 ha (20,298 acres) | 698 | The first national park established in Peru (1961), protecting the Cueva de los Guácharos and a range of habitats from cloud forest to páramo; it conserves cavernicolous fauna, headwaters of the Marañón basin and species such as the spectacled bear. |
| Tingo María National Park | | Huánuco; 9°22′37″S 75°59′53″W | 14 May 1965 | 4,777 ha (11,804 acres) | 163,587 | Established in 1965, it protects selva alta ecosystems and distinctive landscapes such as the “La Bella Durmiente” formation and the Cueva de las Lechuzas, conserving water sources, waterfalls and sites for research and environmental education. |
| Manu National Park ‡ | Panoramic view of the dense, verdant canopy of lowland Amazon rainforest | Cusco and Madre de Dios; 11°51′23″S 71°43′17″W | 29 May 1973 | 1,716,295.22 ha (4,241,058 acres) | 13,701 | Protects a broad altitudinal gradient from high Andean puna to lowland Amazonia, safeguarding exceptional megadiversity and cultural diversity, including indigenous peoples; designated a UNESCO Biosphere Reserve (1977) and a Natural World Heritage Site (1987). |
| Huascarán National Park ‡ | Snow-covered Mount Huascarán seen from a green valley | Ancash; 9°20′0″S 77°24′0″W | 1 July 1975 | 340,000 ha (840,158 acres) | 273,568 | Protects the humid puna and the Cordillera Blanca, including very high glaciated peaks (up to 6,768 m), around 660 glaciers and some 300 glacial lakes, and provides critical hydrological functions for the Santa, Marañón and Pativilca river basins. |
| Cerros de Amotape National Park † | | Tumbes and Piura; 4°08′52″S 80°35′24″W | 22 July 1975 | 152,045.13 ha (375,712 acres) | Unknown | A coastal oasis on the Amotape foothills that protects Pacific tropical forest and equatorial dry forest along the Tumbes River, noted for high plant endemism and important avian diversity. |
| Rio Abiseo National Park ‡ | | San Martín; 7°45′0″S 77°15′0″W | 11 August 1983 | 274,520 ha (678,354 acres) | 740 | Conserves representative cloud forests of the eastern Andean slope, protecting biodiversity and the hydrological stability of the Abiseo, Túmac and Montecristo watersheds, and contains archaeological complexes such as Gran Pajatén and Los Pinchudos. |
| Yanachaga–Chemillén National Park † | | Pasco; 10°24′15″S 75°18′38″W | 29 August 1986 | 122,000 ha (301,469 acres) | 6,943 | Extends along the Yanachaga range (460–3,643 m) and protects steep, forested mountains, deep canyons and a high diversity of ecological formations; considered a Pleistocene refuge and home to Yanesha and other local communities. |
| Bahuaja-Sonene National Park | | Madre de Dios and Puno; 13°16′0″S 69°27′0″W | 17 July 1996 | 1,091,416 ha (2,696,948 acres) | 5 | Conserves a mosaic of habitats in the southwestern Amazon, including the humid Pampas del Heath, cochas and seasonally flooded areas; protects Ese’eja cultural values and links transboundary conservation with Bolivia’s Madidi. |
| Cordillera Azul National Park | Forest-covered mountain ridge fading into mist, with layered green vegetation | San Martín, Loreto, Ucayali, and Huánuco; 7°45′0″S 75°56′24″W | 21 May 2001 | 1,353,190.85 ha (3,343,807 acres) | 3 | Conserves montane and premontane forest formations and key watershed headwaters, protecting the largest area of intact high Amazonian forest in Peru and numerous endemic species. |
| Otishi National Park † | | Junín and Cusco; 11°40′0″S 73°05′0″W | 14 January 2003 | 305,973.05 ha (756,076 acres) | Unknown | Protects the Vilcabamba range and the headwaters of the Ene, Tambo and Urubamba rivers across 750–4,185 m, conserving diverse ecosystems and microclimates, territories of native communities including families in voluntary isolation, and forming part of the Vilcabamba-Amboró conservation corridor. |
| Alto Purús National Park | | Ucayali and Madre de Dios; 10°49′12″S 71°38′24″W | 18 November 2004 | 2,510,694.41 ha (6,204,061 acres) | Unknown | One of Peru’s largest protected areas (over two million hectares) encompassing the Purús basin and distinct non-Andean Amazonian ecosystems; a conservation priority that includes ancestral territory of native communities and areas with groups in voluntary isolation. |
| Ichigkat Muja – Cordillera del Cóndor National Park | | Amazonas; 3°23′34″S 78°6′49″W | 9 August 2007 | 88,477 ha (218,631 acres) | Unknown | Conserves the only Amazonian montane forest representation of the Eastern Real Cordillera in Peru, protecting headwaters, high biological diversity and areas of cultural importance for local jíbaro peoples. |
| Güeppi-Sekime National Park | | Loreto; 0°28′48″S 74°54′36″W | 25 October 2012 | 203,628.51 ha (503,177 acres) | Unknown | Protects floodplain, hill and terrace landscapes on the border with Ecuador, crossed by the Lagartococha, Gueppí, Peneya and Anusilla rivers. Its forests host high plant and animal diversity (627 plant species recorded) including several threatened and endemic species. |
| Sierra del Divisor National Park | | Loreto and Ucayali; 7°16′31″S 74°4′25″W | 9 November 2015 | 1,354,485.10 ha (3,347,006 acres) | Unknown | Protects an isolated mountain complex in the Amazon plain with steep slopes and divisory ridges (>900 m), ancient geology and largely undisturbed areas that harbor many endemics, waterfalls, hot springs and macaw clay-licks. |
| Yaguas National Park | | Loreto; 2°55′0″S 71°31′16″W | 10 January 2018 | 868,927.84 ha (2,147,167 acres) | Unknown | Located in the lower Putumayo basin, it protects extensive intact lowland rainforest and a wide range of aquatic habitats that support unusually high fish diversity, while providing ecosystem services to indigenous communities and forming part of a transboundary forest corridor. |

=== Parks by region or territory ===
| Region | Number | Parks |
|---|---|---|
| Amazonas | 1 | Ichigkat Muja – Cordillera del Cóndor |
| Ancash | 1 | Huascarán |
| Cajamarca | 1 | Cutervo |
| Cusco | 2 | Manu*, Otishi* |
| Huánuco | 2 | Tingo María, Cordillera Azul* |
| Junín | 1 | Otishi* |
| Loreto | 4 | Cordillera Azul*, Güeppi-Sekime, Sierra del Divisor*, Yaguas |
| Madre de Dios | 3 | Manu*, Bahuaja-Sonene*, Alto Purús* |
| Pasco | 1 | Yanachaga–Chemillén |
| Piura | 1 | Cerros de Amotape* |
| Puno | 1 | Bahuaja-Sonene* |
| San Martín | 2 | Río Abiseo, Cordillera Azul* |
| Tumbes | 1 | Cerros de Amotape* |
| Ucayali | 3 | Cordillera Azul*, Alto Purús*, Sierra del Divisor* |

* Shared parks spanning multiple departments; they are listed under each department they cover.

== See also ==
- List of protected areas of Peru
- List of World Heritage Sites in Peru
