= Tourism in Peru =

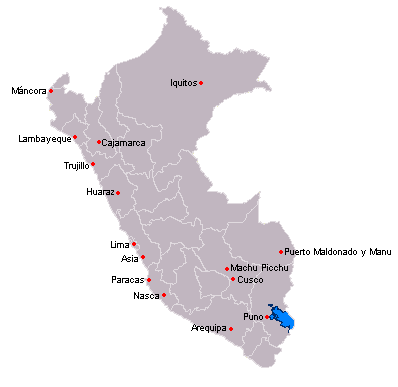
Map showing the 15 most visited tourist destinations in Peru

Since the 2000s, Tourism in Peru has made up the nation's third largest industry, behind fishing and mining. Tourism is directed towards archaeological monuments, ecotourism in the Peruvian Amazon, cultural tourism in colonial cities, gastronomic tourism, sex tourism, adventure tourism, and beach tourism. Iperú is the Peruvian national tourist office.

== Transportation ==
=== Air ===
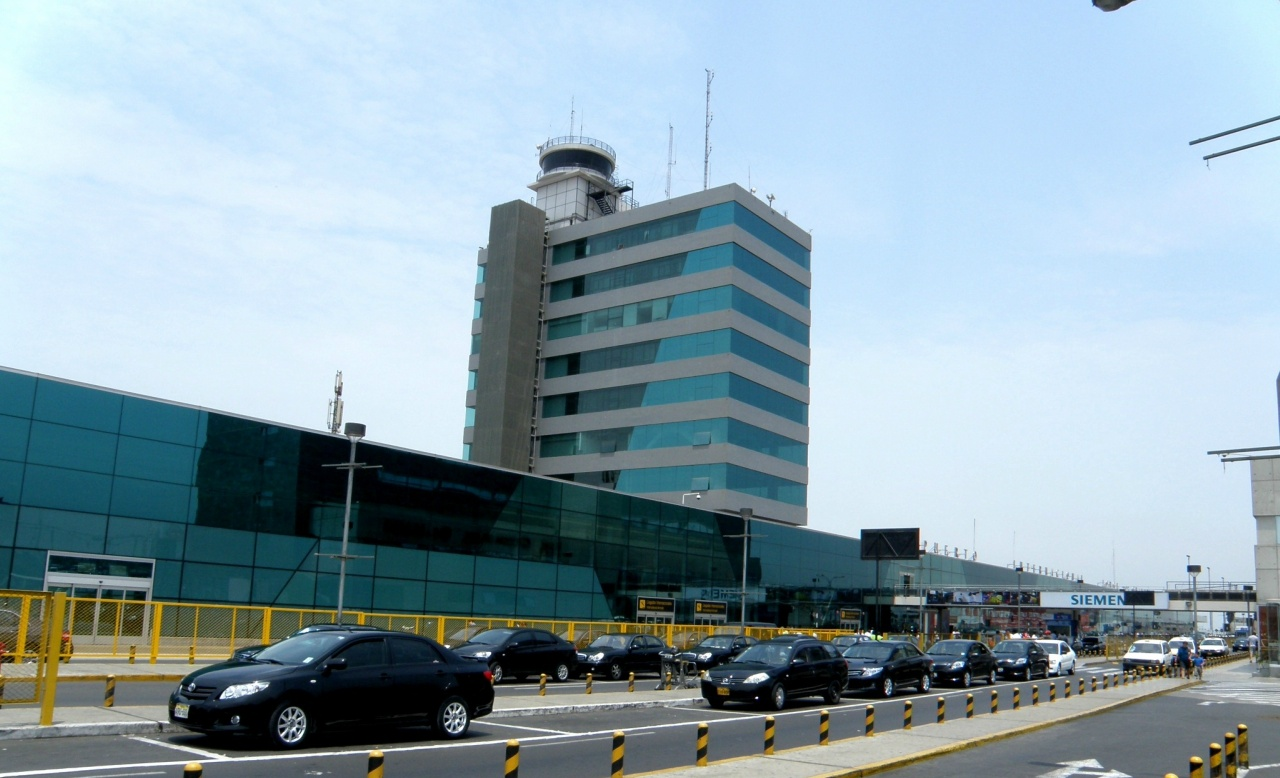
Jorge Chávez International Airport

Peru does not have one clear national airline, but rather a number of airlines offering service to Peru from North America, South America, Europe, and Asia. Some of the most popular airlines are LAN Perú (domestic). The country's airports are also served by many international airlines from other nations. The Jorge Chávez International Airport in Lima is the nation's leading international airport and received 23,659,196 passengers in 2018. Domestic air travel serves as a major method for tourists to traverse the country with multiple airlines offering service between many of Peru's cities.

=== Highways ===
Peru has land borders with five countries and has highway connections with all but Colombia. International bus routes are operated on each of these highways providing service from Peruvian cities to other South American cities. Domestically, the highway system is extensive and covers nearly the entire country excluding the department of Loreto which can be accessed onlyby boat or airplane. There are frequent buses traveling throughout the country. But, bus travel is dangerous as many of these highways are built on cliffs, and accidents leading to death are frequently reported by the media. Occasionally buses are held up by highwaymen in remote areas. The buses range in size and comfort but they usually have cushioned reclining seats and a form of onboard entertainment, such as a movie or music. Many offer bus-camas, or sleeper buses, with seats that recline to become beds.

=== Rail ===
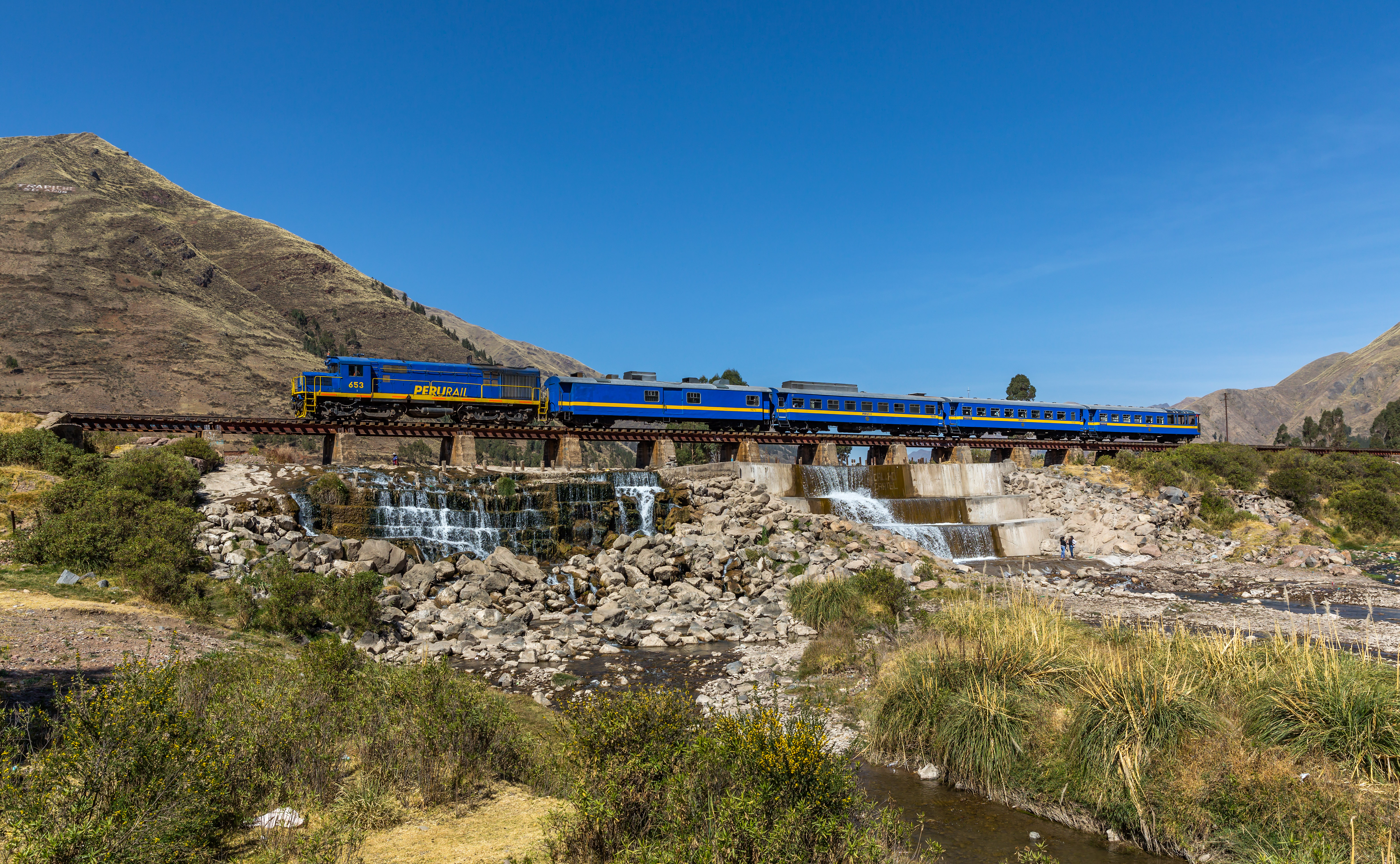
A PeruRail tourist train, Puno-Cusco

The Lima Metro is partially complete, with one line operational, but other regions do not have this system. Tourists must travel by bus or taxi within the city. Outside of Lima, there are only two major railway systems in operation, one in the central part of the country and the other in the south. The Ferrocarril Central Andino starts at sea level in Callao and traverses the Andes, crossing through the Junín and Huancavelica departments.

The southern railway, operated by PeruRail, a company founded by tourism entrepreneur Lorenzo Sousa in 1999, is the one most commonly used by tourists and is considered to have two of the most luxurious rail services in the world, The Hiram Bingham and the Andean explorer, as a segment of its route goes from the city of Cusco to the citadel of Machu Picchu, a major tourist attraction. This route offers seating options ranging from economy class to first class. The railway originates in the city of Mollendo in the Arequipa Region and goes through the Puno and Cusco regions, passing through the cities of Arequipa, Puno, Juliaca, the citadel of Machu Picchu, and ends at Cusco. The railway is operated by PeruRail, the largest railway manager in Peru. A newer railway, Inca Rail, also takes tourists from nearby cities to Aguas Calientes at the bottom of Machu Picchu.

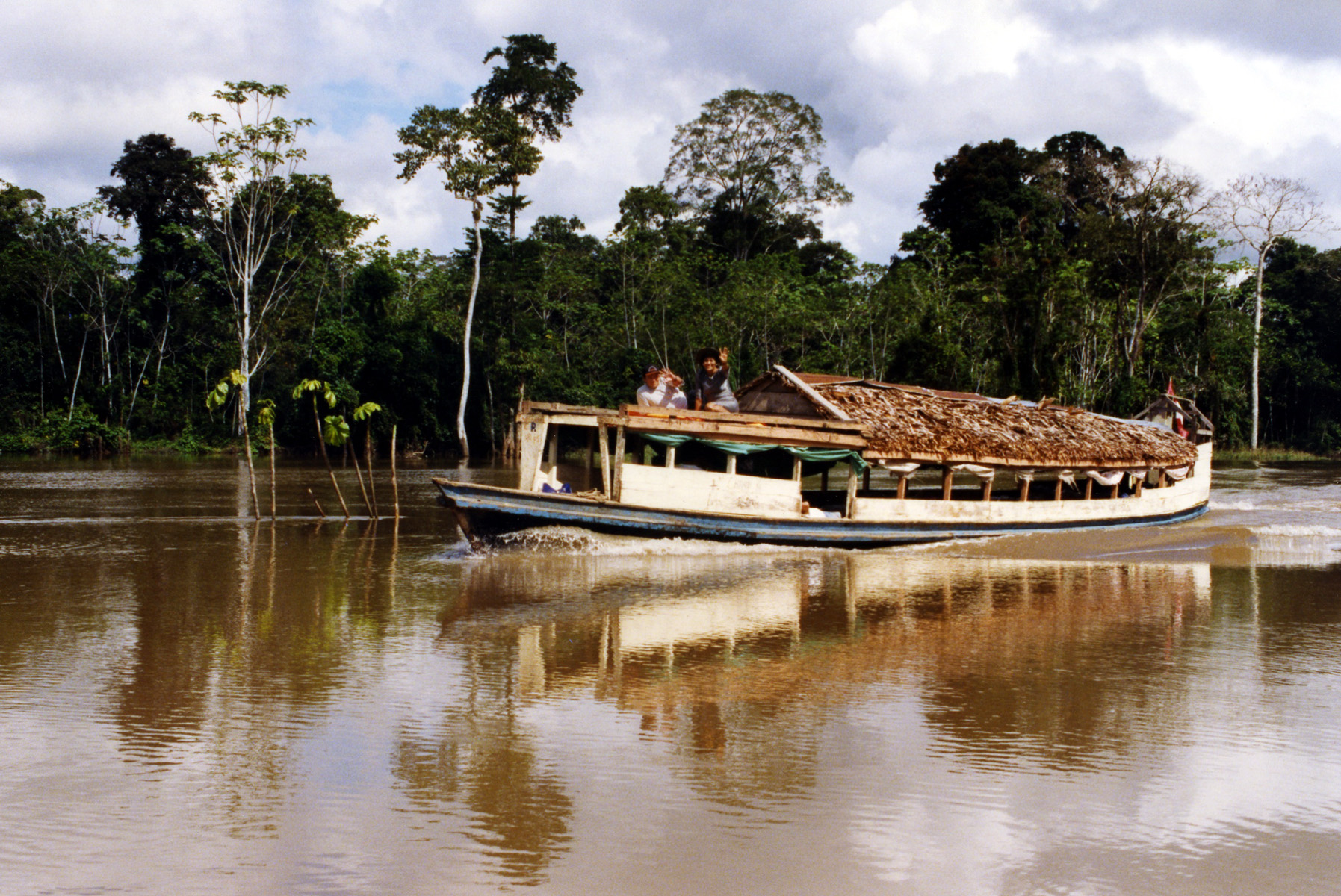
River taxi on the Amazon River

=== River ===
Another mode of transportation in the Amazonian area is river transport. River transportation companies operate routes between the cities of the Peruvian Amazon. The main hubs of this network are the cities of Iquitos, Puerto Maldonado, Pucallpa, and Yurimaguas. Because of the lack of roads in this region, river transport, along with air travel, are the most efficient and important methods of transport.

== Data ==
Tourist arrivals of 2024 in %

Yearly tourist arrivals in millions

Tourism is the third largest industry in Peru. It employs 11% of the labor force in Peru (484,000 direct and 340,000 indirect jobs) the majority of them belonging to the hotel and transportation industries. The industry makes up 7% of the Peruvian gross domestic product and is the fastest growing industry in the country. It is regulated by the Commission for the Promotion of Peru (PromPeru) belonging to the Ministry of Foreign Commerce and Tourism.

In 2000, about 1 million tourists visited Peru that year, with tourist activity increasing due to the decrease of guerrilla activity. By 2017, more than 4 million tourists were visiting the country annually. In 2024 3.2 million international tourists visited Peru with an increase to 3.8 million from January to November 2025.

=== Arrivals by country ===
Most visitors arriving in Peru on a short-term basis in 2017 and 2025 were from the following countries by nationality:

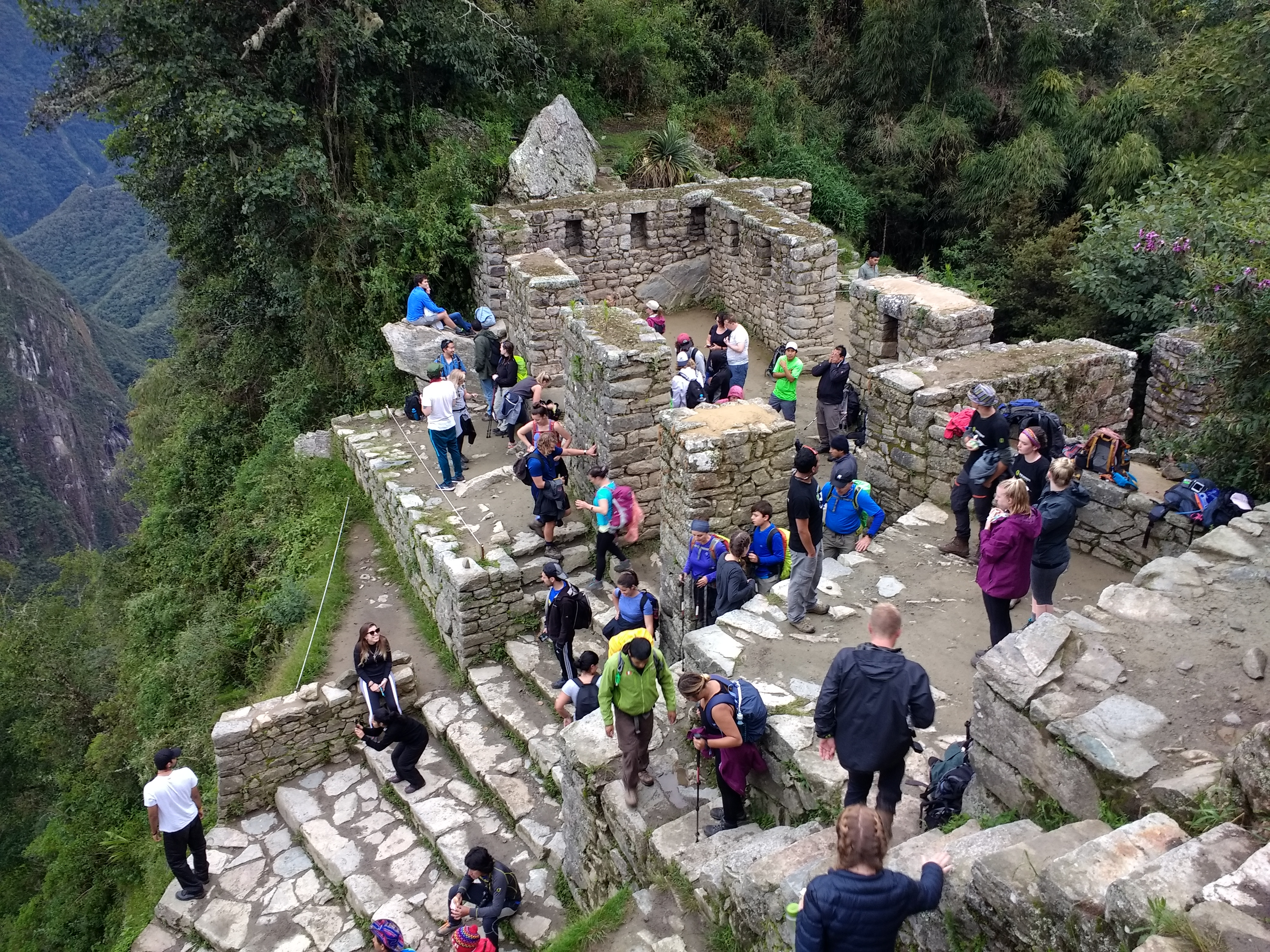
Tourists and guides at Inti Punku

Rank	Country	2025	2017
1	Chile	1,182,764	1,101,055
2	United States	566,000	598,685
3	Ecuador	321,000	288,987
4	Argentina		205,465
5	Colombia	177,000	200,812
6	Venezuela	N/D	196,495
7	Brazil	205,000	173,753
8	Spain		147,214
9	Bolivia	206,000	146,660
10	France		96,283
11	Mexico		93,763

The figures for 2025 are from January to November, together, these nationalities accounted for 69.7% of total international arrivals in the country.

== Themes ==
=== Cultural tourism ===
Machu Picchu

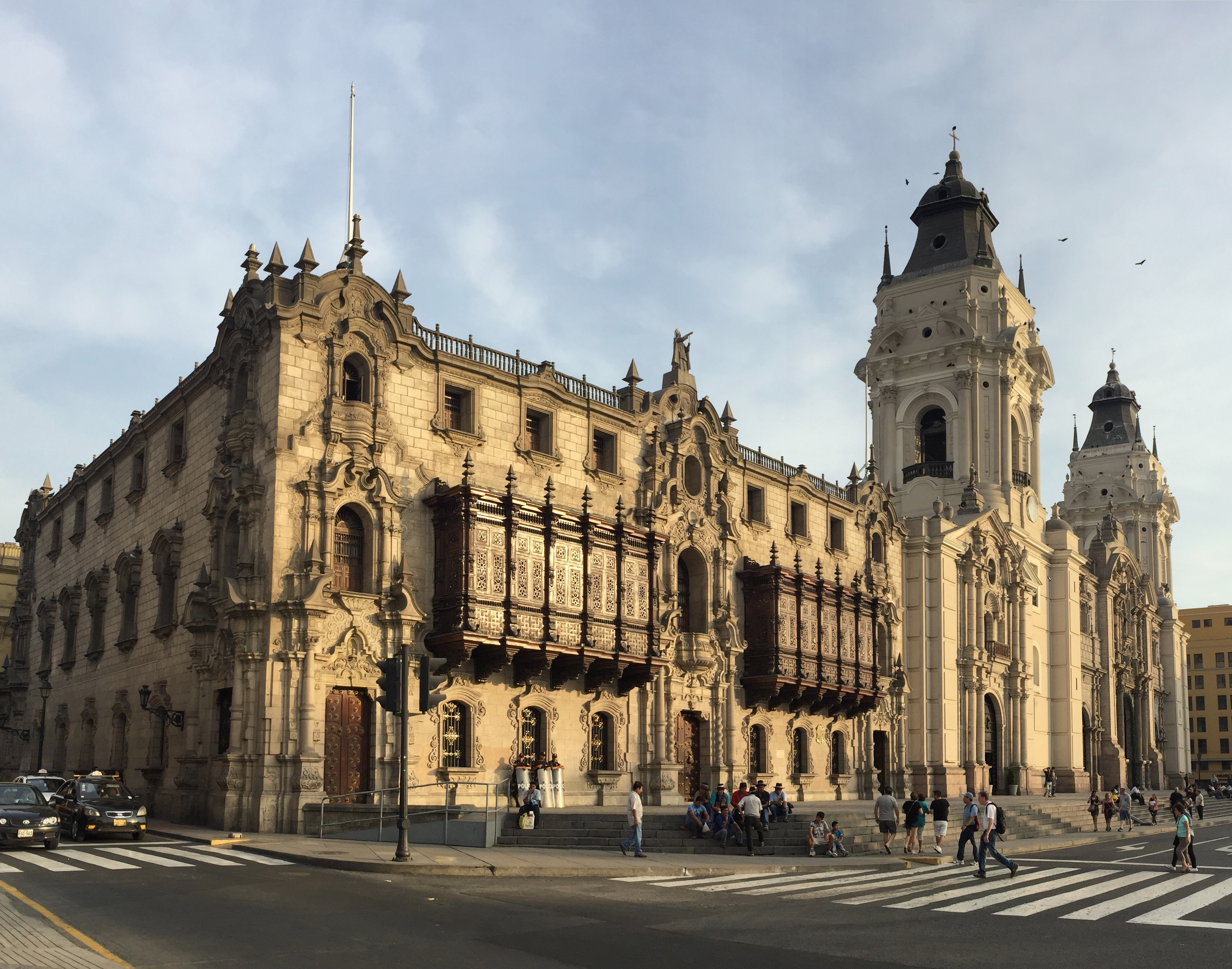
The Cathedral of Lima in the Historic Centre of Lima

Cultural tourism forms the largest sector of the tourism industry in Peru. Pre-Columbian civilizations – most notably the Inca Empire, Chavín, Moche, and Nasca – left a large archeological and cultural impact on the nation. The ruins of Machu Picchu are the most internationally recognized of all the ruins of Peru and therefore receive the most tourists. The other popular ruins are those of Chan Chan, Sipán, Kuelap, Nazca Lines, Ollantaytambo, Caral, Sacsayhuamán, and Sillustani.

Tourists also visit the Spanish colonial architecture in many cities in Peru. Some of the most outstanding examples of Spanish colonial architecture are in the cities of Lima, Arequipa, and Cusco. These areas, many built over 500 years ago, demonstrate the superb architectural ingenuity of the colonists during the Viceroyalty of Peru. The city of Lima has many acclaimed museums holding works of art reflecting the diverse history of the country. These museums include the National Museum, National Museum of Anthropology, Archeology and History; Rafael Larco Herrera Archeological Museum, National Museum of Peruvian Culture, and Museum of Italian Art, among many others. There are also many museums outside Lima, including the Regional Museum of the National University of San Martin in Tarapoto, San Martin.

=== Ecotourism ===
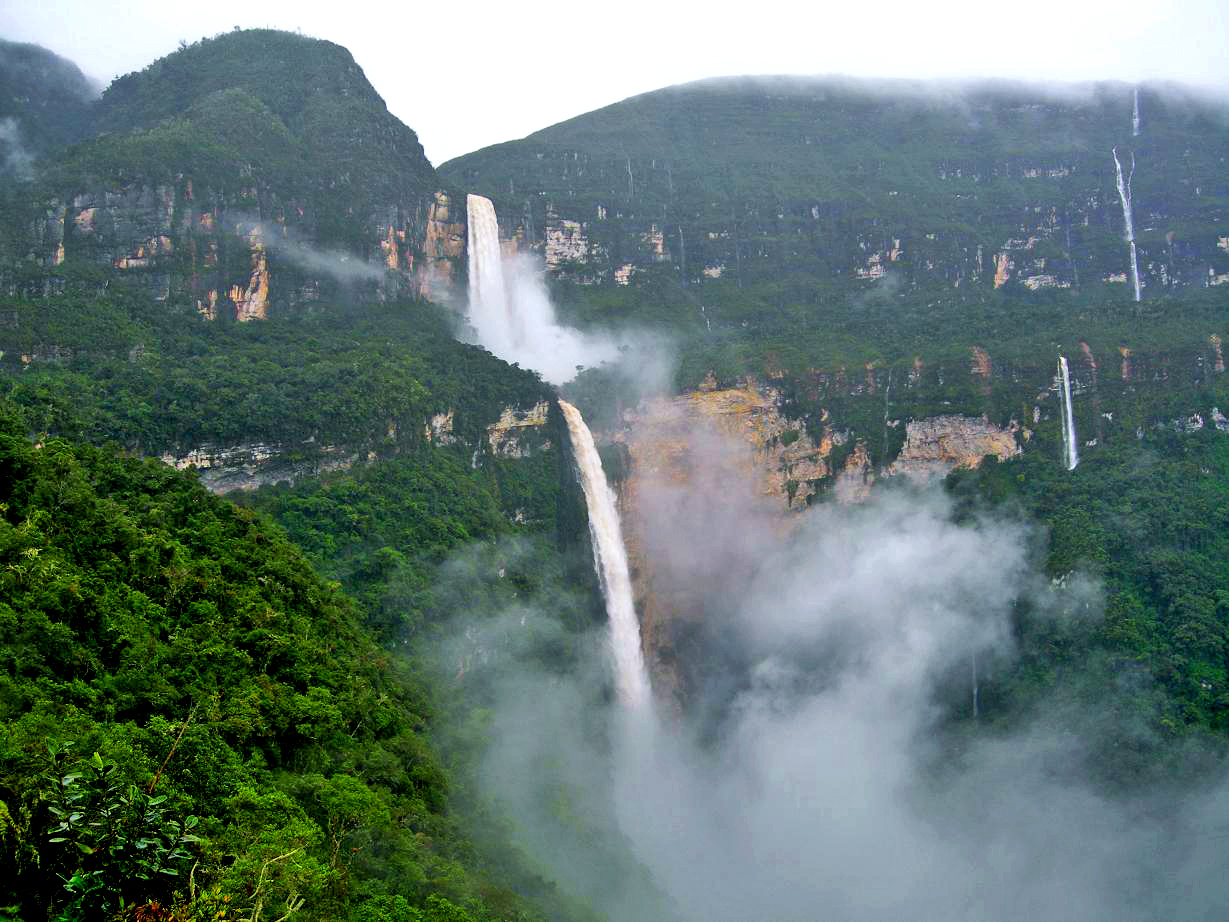
Gocta Cataracts near Chachapoyas, Peru

The landscape of Peru is beautiful and diverse lending itself to tourism, and also ecotourism. The ecological diversity allows for ecotourism that is distinct for each region. Peru is home to mountains, rainforests, and miles of beaches that are all accessible to ecotourists looking to absorb all that Peru has to offer. 60% of the land of Peru is in the Amazon Basin, and 74% of the land is covered by the Amazon rainforest itself. Peru has a higher percentage of land area protected in national parks and reserves than any other country in South America. The Peruvian Amazon is one of the most pristine, virgin, and untouched rainforests on the earth, making it a destination for tourists interested in nature and ecology; this has prompted increased tourist infrastructure.

The need for environmentally conscious economic opportunity in Peru is apparent. Many Peruvians have resorted to financial income channels that are harmful to the environment because environmental degradation and changes in the country have caused a decline in alternative economic opportunities. Illegal logging as a source of income is a dominant example of this and a product of the lack of economic opportunity in many regions in Peru. Not only is illegal logging extremely harmful to the environment, but it also is damaging to local and indigenous livelihoods. By creating alternatives to this, like ecotourism, there is an opportunity for ecological conservation, economic development, and political empowerment of local and indigenous communities in Peru.

Increased ecotourism has prompted increased tourist infrastructure. Nearly 1 million hectares and counting of the rainforest has been decimated between 2001 and 2015 with the following main causes: deforestation and soil degradation, small and medium-scale agriculture, large-scale agriculture, pasture for livestock, gold mining, coca cultivation, and road construction. The threat of ongoing destruction to the Amazon draws tourists to Peru through ecotourism and environmental voluntourism. Many small communities in Peru suffer from deforestation and other negative environmental impacts. Ecotourism, conservation, and reforestation are possible solutions.

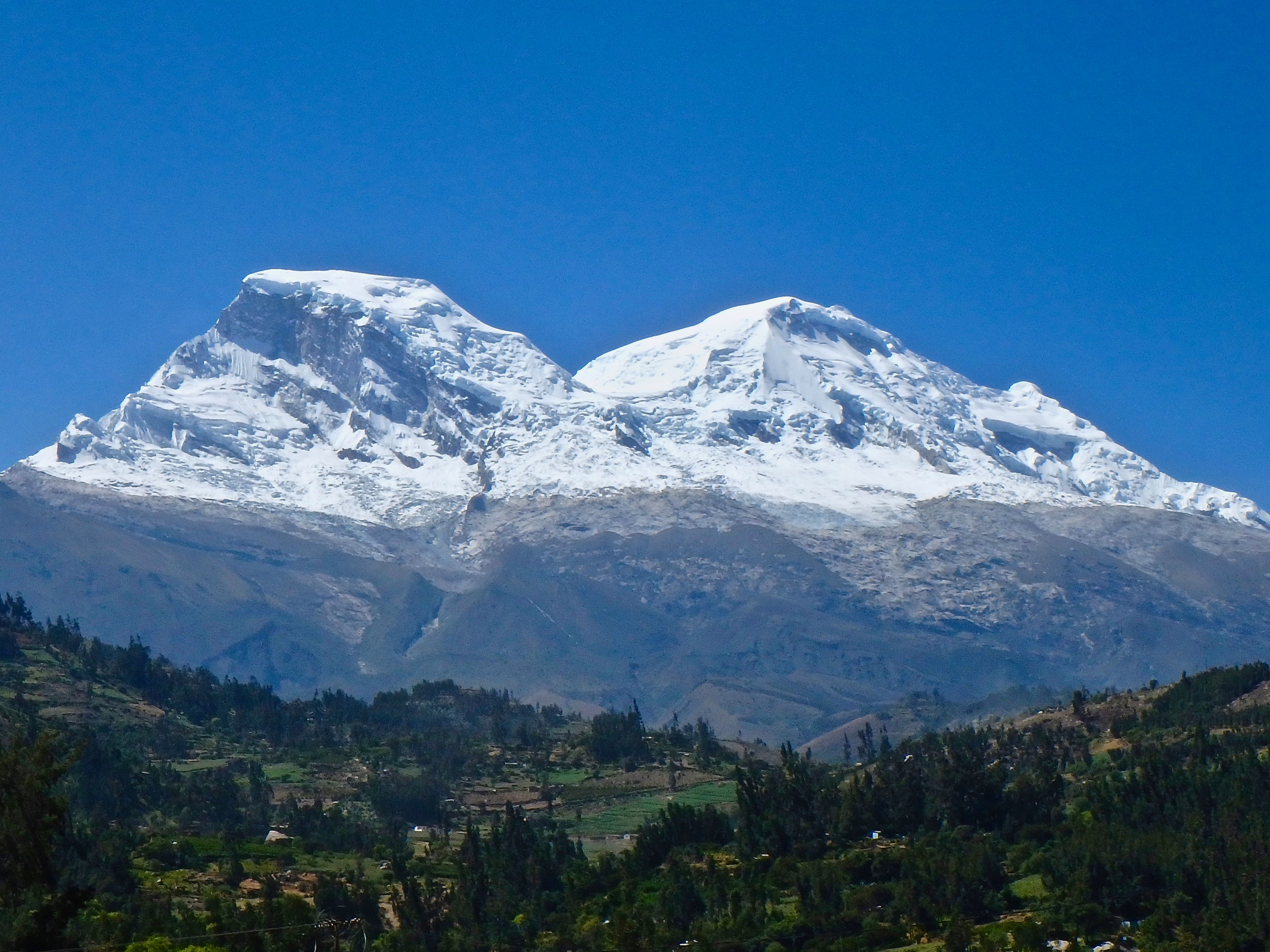
Huascarán, Peru's tallest point

The Peruvian Amazon is divided into two areas: the High Jungle and the Lower Jungle. The High Jungle is more easily accessible, while the Lower Jungle is more pristine and untouched. In recent times, however, the government has increased accessibility to the Lower Jungle. Both areas contain an unrivaled diversity of animal and plant life. Large national preserves of interest to tourists include the Manu National Park, Rio Abiseo National Park, Pacaya Samiria National Reserve, and the Tambopata-Candamo Protected Area. Tourist agencies in these areas promote eco-friendly tourism to preserve the fragile ecosystems of the rainforest.

In the Áncash Region, tourists also experience the mountainous terrain of the Andes. The region has two mountain ranges of the Andes; the Cordillera Negra, a dark line of mountains without any glacial peaks and the Cordillera Blanca, a line of snowcapped mountains with glaciers. Huascarán, the tallest point in Peru and the fourth highest mountain in the Americas. The region also hosts Huascarán National Park, which holds biodiversity of various flora and fauna, being a World Heritage Site since 1985.

In the Piuria region, tourists flock to the gorgeous beaches and there are lots of surfers who travel in order to catch the waves. There are lots of beaches near Talara, the "tourist capital of Piuria", and since it is located on the Equator, there is beautiful weather all year round. Along with beaches and surfing, Piuria boasts of forest, wildlife, and its own distinct dry forest ecosystem. A non-profit organization, Ecoswell, now offers opportunities for dry forest ecotourism in Piuria, specifically in Lobitos and surrounding towns. EcoSwell employs locals who understand the land and show ecotourists the best parts.

=== Adventure tourism ===
Because of Peru's geographical diversity, it is possible to go surfing, sandboarding, 4x4, dune buggy, alpinism, rafting, rappelling, downhill, rally, trekking, skiing, and mountain climbing. Surfing is extremely popular in Peru, and the country has been host to numerous national and international competitions in the sport. The country is home to the world-famous surfer Sofía Mulánovich.

Peru is divided into three geographical regions: the coast, the sierra, and the jungle. Each one has numerous activities suited to its particular climate and environment. The sport of skiing is developing in the city of Huaraz, and new resorts are created to suit the rising tourist demand. The sand dunes of Ica are popular for dune buggies. River rafting has become very popular among national and international tourists in recent years, and availability in Lima and Cusco is high. Rapids range in difficulty and there are rafting options from novices to experts. Trekking has become the most popular type of adventure sport among tourists in Peru. This is because of the treks offered from Cusco to Machu Picchu, as well as trails in other parts of the country such as Ancash. Mountain climbing is a popular sport among tourists in the sierra region.

For more information on adventure tourism see the Ancash section of this article below.

=== Gastronomic tourism ===
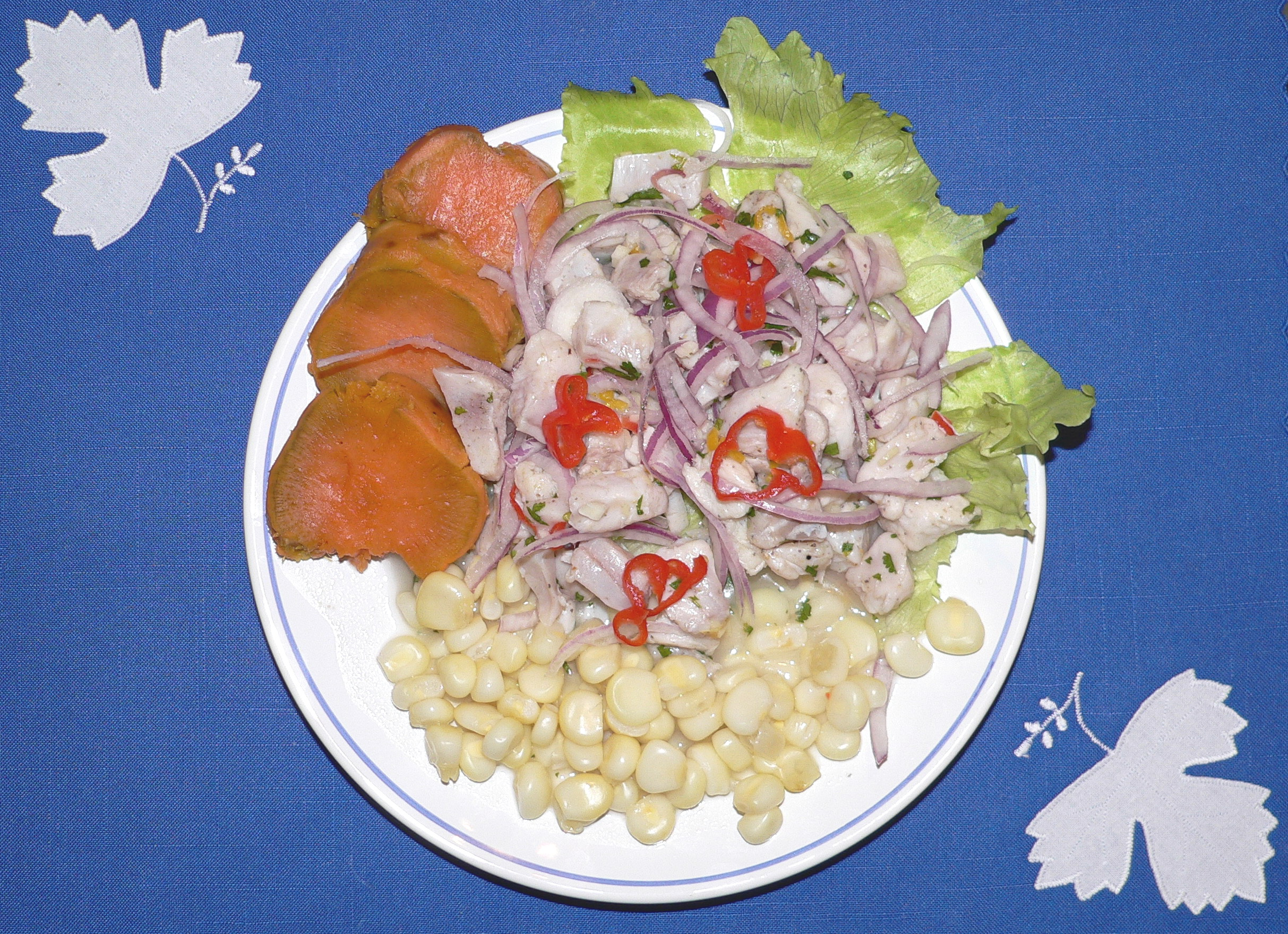
Ceviche is a popular Peruvian seafood dish.

Peruvian cuisine stems mainly from the combination of Spanish cuisine with traditional Andean ingredients, as well later influences from the cuisines of China, Italy, West Africa and Japan, due to the arrival of immigrants from those locations. Each of these cuisines has had to be heavily adapted because of a lack or scarcity of many ingredients. For example, it is still impossible to find such commonplace items as lemons, turnips, kale and chestnuts in Peru. It is next to impossible to find authentic foreign cuisine to this day because of a lack of ingredients. For example, one cannot find authentic Chinese dishes such as Mapo dofu. Instead one finds a mixture of Chinese cooking that has been adapted to the ingredients available in Peru known as Chifa.

The three traditional staples of Peruvian cuisine are corn, potatoes and beans. These ingredients have been combined with a number of staples brought by the Spanish, such as rice, wheat and meat (such as beef, pork and chicken). Many traditional foods, such as quinoa, kiwicha, chili peppers and several roots and tubers which had previously been tossed aside for European products, have seen a resurgence in popularity in recent decades with a revival of interest in native Peruvian food crops.

Traditional foods in the coast, mountains, and jungle are markedly different from each other. Because of this, the local gastronomy depends greatly on what part of Peru one visits.

=== Beach tourism ===
Peru boasts a 2,414-kilometer coastline littered with many beaches attractive to any type of traveler. Beachgoing in Peru is extremely popular among domestic and international travelers alike. Beach resorts and towns are abundant along the coast and many are in popular areas which attract visitors. Two of the most popular beach areas are Máncora and Punta Sal in the Piura and Tumbes regions respectively, and Asia in the Lima Department.

The northern beaches of Máncora and Punta Sal have a pleasant beach climate year round whereas Asia is primarily a summertime beach. Because Asia is located near the city of Lima, many beachgoers own houses in that area. In contrast, Máncora is many hours from major cities so visitors usually stay in hotels or resorts.

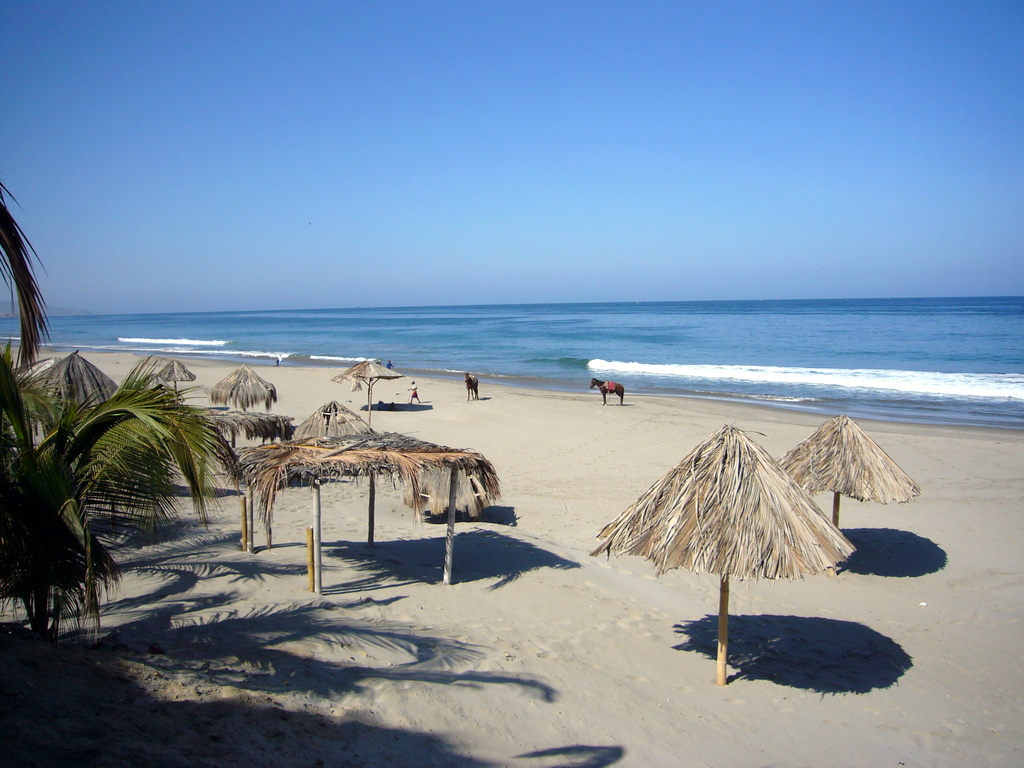
A beach in Máncora, Piura Region

Beachgoing in Peru is affected by fads: Beach homeowners moved from beach to beach resulting from the oversaturation of one beach. In previous years, the beach of Ancón was the most popular of Lima; it became oversaturated and beachgoers moved south of the city to the beaches of Punta Hermosa, San Bartolo, Santa Maria and Pucusana. In the last decade, these beaches have become oversaturated as well and beachgoers have moved further south to the development of Asia, which has now become extremely popular and is the primary beach destination for Limeans.

Máncora, 17 hours north of Lima by bus and 1.5 hours by plane from Talara, is older than Asia but still a relatively new development. In recent years it has experienced a tourist boom and beachgoers flock there. Its beaches have white sand and the town has many nightclubs and bars frequented by thousands of tourists. The popularity of this beach has become so great that a movie has been made about the beach: Máncora. Punta Sal is another beach a half-hour north of Mancora, less popular among young people, and the destination for older people seeking relaxation. Nonetheless, it remains a large tourist attraction and is characterized by its white sand beaches and turquoise color waters. Peruvian beaches are popular places for surfing and their waves are world-renowned.

Peru is a recognized location for surfing. In and around Lima there are surf options for tourists. On the northern coast is the town of Puerto Chicama, home to the longest left-breaking wave in the world at 1.4 miles (2.2 km). Surf tourism on the northern coast of Peru is relatively new. In 1998, mudslides caused by a major El Niño event altered the seafloor on the coast of Peru and brought significant amounts of sand to the beaches. These environmental changes to the seafloor and coastline of the Peruvian town of Lobitos created the perfect waves and conditions for surfing. By the early 2000s, these waves were discovered by surfers, putting Lobitos on the map as a popular surf tourism destination. Surf tourism is a Sport for development and peace (SDP) initiative, which intends to use sports like surfing to create economic and social benefits for impoverished or lower-income countries. The commodification of natural resources like surf breaks in rural coastal regions in Peru is what connects surf tourism to both ecotourism and beach tourism. These natural beach and ocean resources have the ability to draw tourists to lower-income regions of Peru and boost the economy. Surf tourism in Peru has the potential to act as an agent of ecotourism and aid in the goals of conserving the environment and improving the well-being of local Peruvian people. It is crucial that the development programs utilizing surf tourism prioritize developing locals' skills for participating in the new economy and actively challenge the potential harms of tourism growth to the local communities and environment in Peru.

=== Luxury travel ===
This niche of tourists arrive seeking high-end hotels and premium experiences in unique destinations, and travel mainly from the U.S. and Europe, but increasingly also from Asian countries, particularly China. The main destinations of interest are Cusco, Urubamba, and Machu Picchu. Other areas visited include the Puno Region and Lake Titicaca, as well as Iquitos and the Colca Canyon in Arequipa, as the government, local authorities and local and international travel firms have made large investments in hotels, infrastructure and other tourism development.

The addition of the a luxury train route between Arequipa and Cusco has added a significant luxury mark to this part of Peru.

The Peruvian government has made major efforts at securing international investment in the country's high-end tourism industry, particularly in emerging markets. There are investors from major international hotel chains willing to invest millions of dollars (upwards of US$10 million) in 5-star hotels and resorts in the Mancora and Punta Sal area under capital investment or joint venture schemes. The investors are comprised by more than 115 investment funds of the U.S. and Europe.

== World Heritage Sites and National Parks ==
There are eleven locations in Peru designated as World Heritage Sites by UNESCO, three of these places being national parks. These monuments receive many tourists due to their uniqueness, aesthetic attraction, and cultural significance.

World Heritage Sites

- Qhapaq Ñan (Andean Road System)
- Sacred City of Caral-Supe
- Chan Chan Archaeological Zone
- Chankillo Complex
- Chavín (archaeological site)
- City of Cuzco
- Plaza de Armas (Cusco)
- Historic Centre of Lima
- Historic Sanctuary of Machu Picchu
- Historic Centre of the City of Arequipa
- Huascarán National Park
- Lines and Geoglyphs of Nazca and Pampas de Jumana
- Manu National Park
- Rio Abiseo National Park

National Parks

- Alto Purús
- Amotape Hills
- Bahuaja-Sonene
- Biabo Cordillera Azul National Forest
- Cutervo
- Huascarán
- Ichigkat muja– Cordillera del Condor
- Manu
- Otishi
- Rio Abiseo
- Tingo María
- Yanachaga-Chemillén

== Awards ==
According to a 2005 Peruvian government study, the satisfaction rate for tourists after visiting Peru is 94%. Peru has received a number of tourism awards.

=== World Travel Awards ===
Peru has been recognized by the World Travel Awards on numerous occasions.

Year	Category	Result
2012	World's Leading Culinary Destination	Won
2012	World's Leading Green Destination	Won
2013	World's Leading Culinary Destination	Won
2014	World's Leading Culinary Destination	Won
2014	World's Leading Tourism Authority Website	Won
2015	World's Leading Culinary Destination	Won
2016	World's Leading Culinary Destination	Won
2017	World's Leading Culinary Destination	Won
2017	World's Leading Tourist Attraction	Won
2018	World's Leading Culinary Destination	Won
2018	World's Leading Cultural Destination	Won
2018	World's Leading Tourist Attraction	Won
2019	World's Leading Culinary Destination	Won
2019	World's Leading Cultural Destination	Won

=== Other awards ===
Peru has been recognized by the Condé Nast Traveler Readers' Choice Awards.

Year	Category	Recipient	Issuer
2019	Top Countries of the World	Peru	Condé Nast Traveler Readers' Choice Awards
2019	Top 30 Hotels in South America		
2021	Best Resorts in the World	Hotel Paracas, a Luxury Collections Resort	Condé Nast Traveler Readers' Choice Awards

== See also ==
- Peruvian retablo
- Visa policy of Peru
