= Liz Chicaje =

Peruvian environmental activist

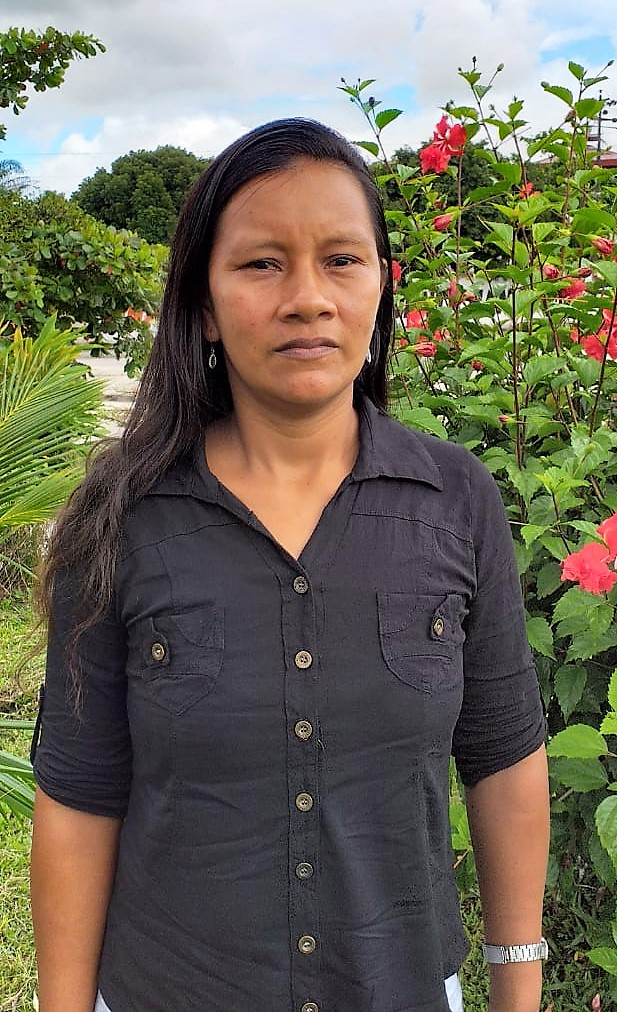
Liz Chicaje

Liz Chicaje Churay (born 1982) is an indigenous Peruvian leader who has contributed significantly to the protection of rainforests and rivers in the Loreto area of northeastern Peru, safeguarding the rights of the Yagua people. Thanks to her efforts, the Yaguas National Park was established in 2018. In January 2019 in Lima, she was awarded the Franco-German prize for human rights by the French and German ambassadors.

== Biography ==
Liz Chicaje was born in 1982 into the indigenous community of Boras de Pucaurquillo in the Pebas District of Peru's Loreto Region. She belongs to the Newat (sparrowhawk) clan. When she was a child, she was brought up in the forest where she learnt to appreciate the importance of nature and the wild animals. As she grew older, the native communities living in the area were increasingly threatened by illegal logging and mining. After deciding to take on the task of fighting for the well-being of these communities, she developed her leadership skills and in 2013 sought to become mayor of the Pebas district. Although she did not win, she became more familiar with the problems of the people in the district.

Thanks to her work, in 2014 she was elected president of FECONA, a federation of native Ampiyacu communities, providing an opportunity for collaboration with other native federations in the area. She worked towards the preservation of the area surrounded by the Napo, Putumayo and Amazon rivers neighbouring Colombia and Brazil. As a member of the Committee for the Categorization of the Yaguas Reserved Zone, she worked towards the development of the Yaguas National Park in which the native communities could be integrated and protected.

In 2017, the Ministry of Environment of Peru invited her to participate in the work of the COP 23. She presented her proposals on the Yaguas National Park at the United Nations Climate Change Conference in Bonn, Germany.

Thanks to her efforts, the Yaguas National Park was established in 2018. In January 2019 in Lima, she was awarded the Franco-German prize for human rights by the French and German ambassadors.

Chicaje was awarded the Goldman Environmental Prize in 2021.
