= Pristimantis cosnipatae =

Conservation status
- Critically Endangered (IUCN 3.1)

Scientific classification
- Kingdom: Animalia
- Phylum: Chordata
- Class: Amphibia
- Order: Anura
- Family: Strabomantidae
- Genus: Pristimantis
- Species: P. cosnipatae

Binomial name
- Pristimantis cosnipatae (Duellman, 1978)

Synonyms
- Eleutherodactylus cosnipatae Duellman, 1978

Species of frog

Pristimantis cosnipatae, also known as Rio Cosnipata robber frog, is a species of frog in the family Strabomantidae. It is endemic to Cusco Department, Peru. It is believed to only occur in the Cosñipata Valley (also spelled Kosñipata). The specific name cosnipatae refers to this valley. Last seen in 1999, this species is considered "critically endangered".

== Description ==
Pristimantis cosnipatae is a robust-bodied small frog. Adult males measure 21.8–29.5 mm (0.86–1.16 in) in snout–vent length. Head is longer than it is wide and the snout is long and narrow. The tympanum is prominent. Forearms are short and robust, and hind limbs are moderately short and robust. The fingers and the toes have lateral fringes and bear wide, truncate discs. The dorsum is finely shagreened and grayish tan to reddish brown in color, with dark brown markings. The iris is bronze and has a median horizontal red streak.

It has been suggested that before 2012 when Paedophryne amauensis was described, Pristimantis cosnipatae held the record for world's smallest frog. However, this species is not particularly small.

The male advertisement call is a soft "wraank".

== Habitat and conservation ==
Its natural habitat is tall submontane and montane cloud forest, with some tree ferns and bromeliads and rich undergrowth of mosses and ferns, at elevations of 1,580–1,700 m (5,180–5,580 ft) above sea level. The species was last seen in 1999, despite several targeted surveys, the latest one in 2016. A possible cause is chytridiomycosis. A part of the range is within the Manú National Park, offering good protection (if the species still persists).
