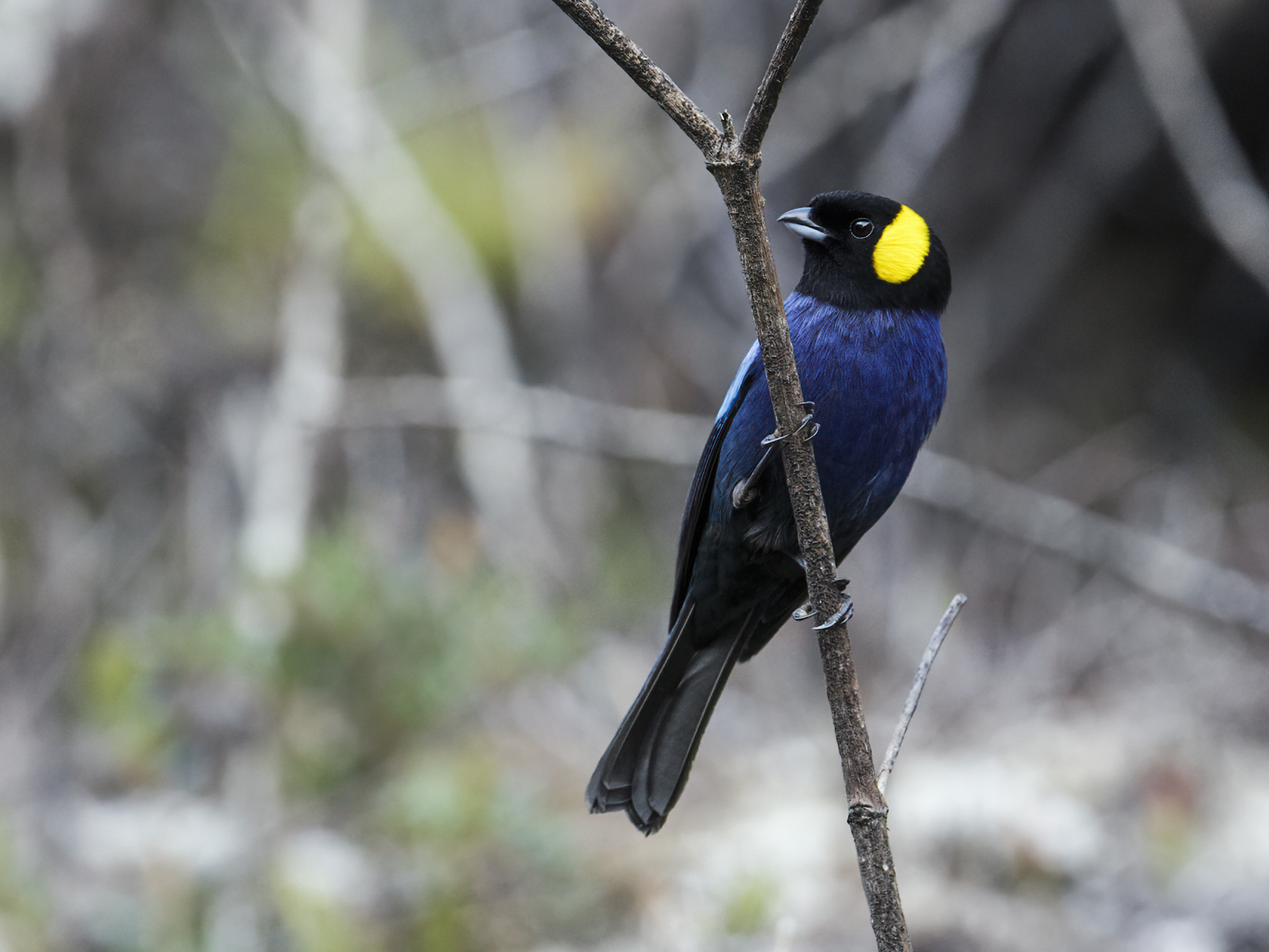

Conservation status
- Least Concern (IUCN 3.1)

Scientific classification
- Kingdom: Animalia
- Phylum: Chordata
- Class: Aves
- Order: Passeriformes
- Family: Thraupidae
- Genus: Iridosornis
- Species: I. reinhardti

Binomial name
- Iridosornis reinhardti Sclater, PL, 1865

= Yellow-scarfed tanager =

Species of bird

The yellow-scarfed tanager (Iridosornis reinhardti) is a species of bird in the family Thraupidae. It is found in forests in the Andean highlands in Peru.

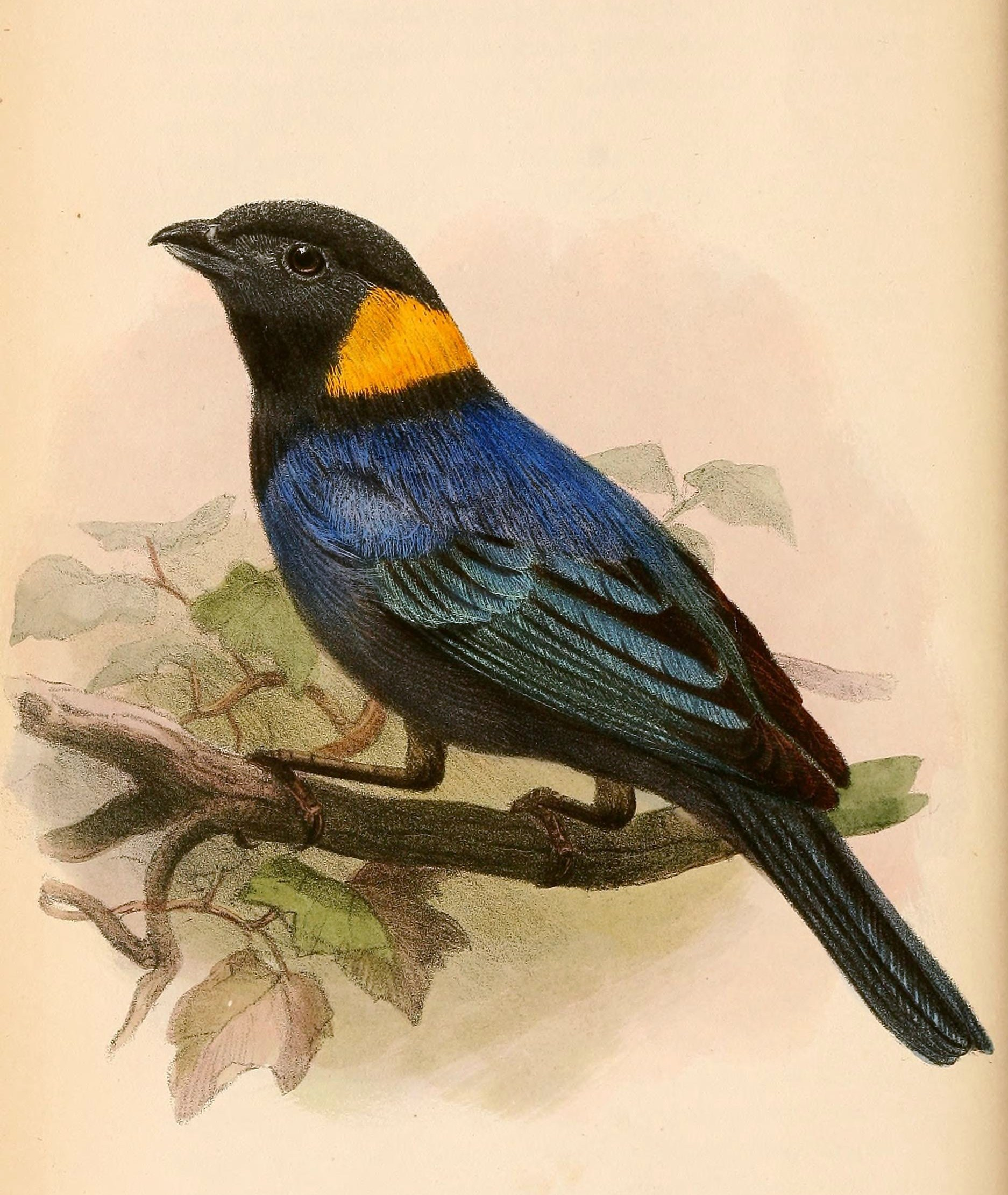

== See also ==
- White-spectacled bulbul
