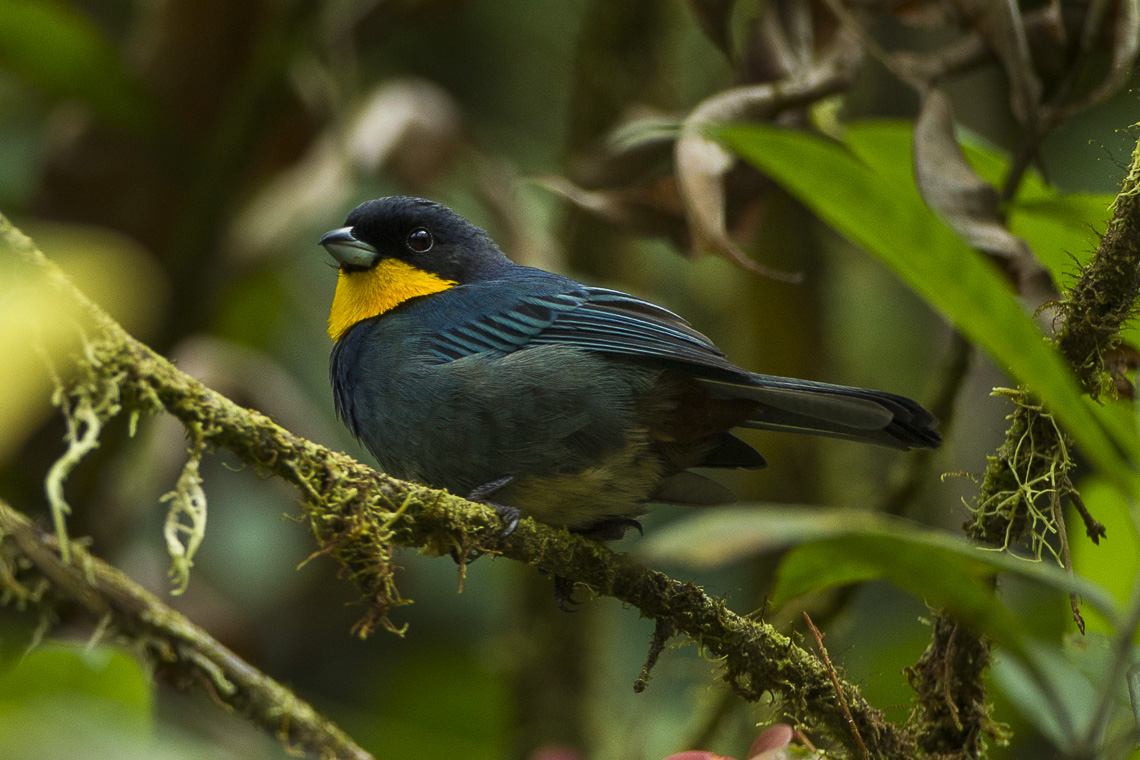

Conservation status
- Near Threatened (IUCN 3.1)

Scientific classification
- Kingdom: Animalia
- Phylum: Chordata
- Class: Aves
- Order: Passeriformes
- Family: Thraupidae
- Genus: Iridosornis
- Species: I. porphyrocephalus

Binomial name
- Iridosornis porphyrocephalus Sclater, PL, 1856

= Purplish-mantled tanager =

Species of bird

The purplish-mantled tanager (Iridosornis porphyrocephalus) is a species of bird in the family Thraupidae. It is found in Colombia and Ecuador. Its natural habitats are subtropical or tropical moist montane forests and heavily degraded former forest. It is threatened by habitat loss.
