= Alto Purús National Park =

National park in Peru

- Parque Nacional Alto Purús (Spanish)
- IUCN category II (national park)
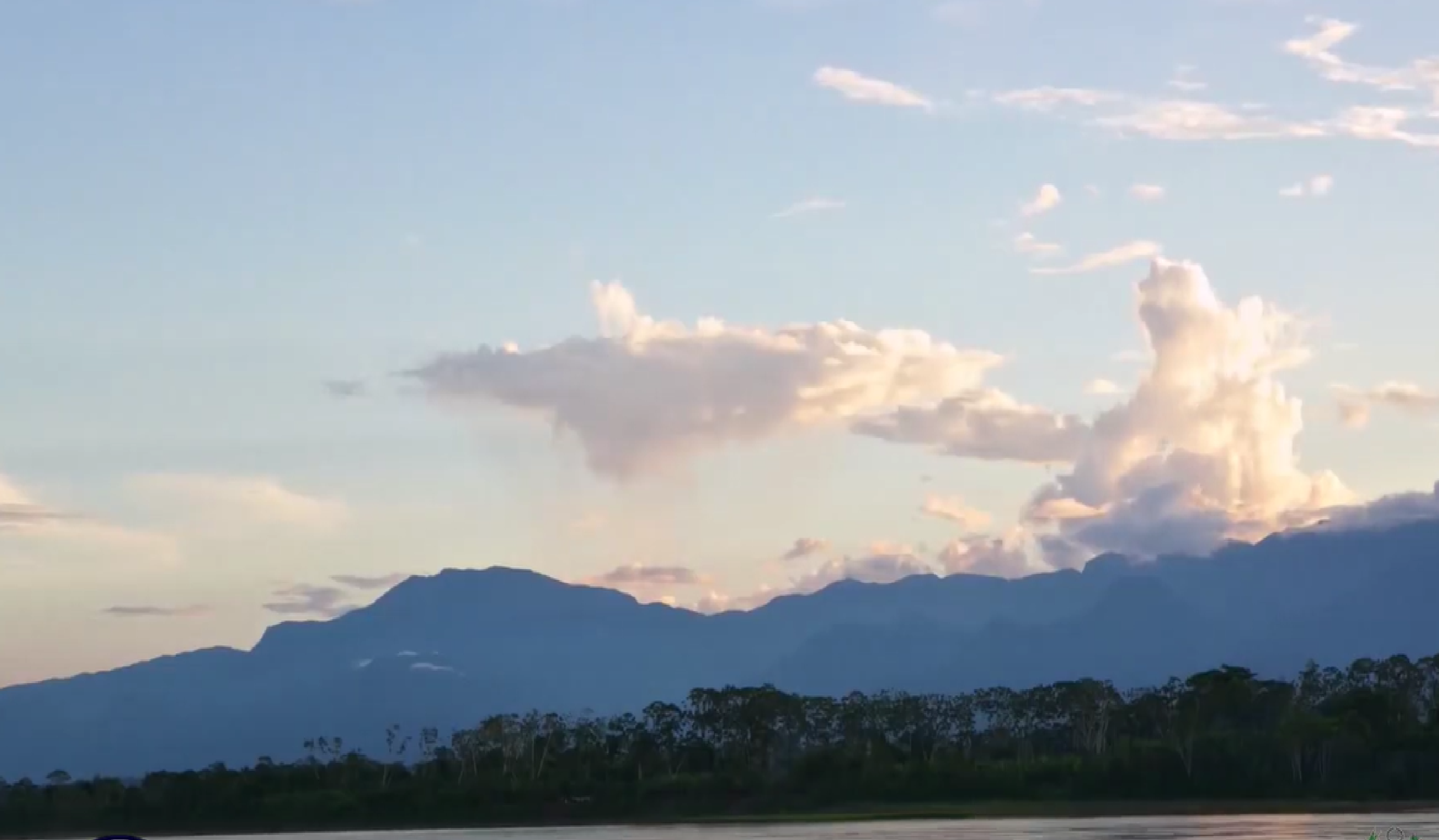
- Alto Purús National Park

- Location within Peru
- Interactive map of Alto Purús National Park
- Location: Peru; Ucayali and Madre de Dios
- Coordinates: 10.82°S 71.64°W
- Area: 2,510,694 hectares (9,693.84 sq mi)
- Established: November 18, 2004
- Governing body: SERNANP
- Website: Parque Nacional Alto Purús

Alto Purús National Park (Spanish: Parque Nacional Alto Purús) is a national park in the Amazon rainforest of Peru, established in 2004. It covers an area of 2,510,694.41 ha (9,693.85 sq mi) in the provinces of Purús (Ucayali), Tahuamanu and Tambopata (both in Madre de Dios).

It is also home to a number of indigenous tribes, including some that have avoided contact with the outside world.

== Geography ==
Although the Amazon rainforest plain dominates the landscape, hilly terrain can be found in the western part of the park. The main rivers in the area (Purús, Curanja, Cujar and Curiuja) can have some sandy shores.

== Climate ==
Average annual precipitation in the area is 2600 mm, with heavy rains from December to April (which causes the rise of water level in rivers and streams), while the rest of the year is less rainy. The average temperature is around 25 °C, and can be as low as 17 °C and as high as 35 °C.

== Ecology ==
=== Flora ===
The park harbors tropical forest ecosystems. Among the plant species found in the park are: Swietenia macrophylla, Iriartea deltoidea, Cedrela odorata, Ceiba insignis, Endlicheria spp., Quararibea cordata, Ruellia brevifolia, Attalea butyracea, Tabebuia serratifolia, Ceiba pentandra, Hevea brasiliensis, Cedrelinga cateniformis, Heliconia episcopalis, Myroxylon balsamum, Ocotea spp., Manilkara bidentata, Psychotria viridis, Gloxinia perennis, Inga spp., Theobroma cacao, Dipteryx rosea, Passiflora coccinea, Calycophyllum spruceanum, Sapium glandulosum, Erigeron bonariensis, Pouteria caimito, Salix humboldtiana, Calathea spp., Tabernaemontana markgrafiana, Hippeastrum ferreyrae, Guadua sarcocarpa, Phyllanthus brasiliensis, Eugenia spp., Mauritia flexuosa, Amburana cearensis, Bertholletia excelsa, Ficus spp., Ocimum campechianum, Celtis schippii, Pachystachys spicata, Alibertia edulis, Oenocarpus bataua, etc.

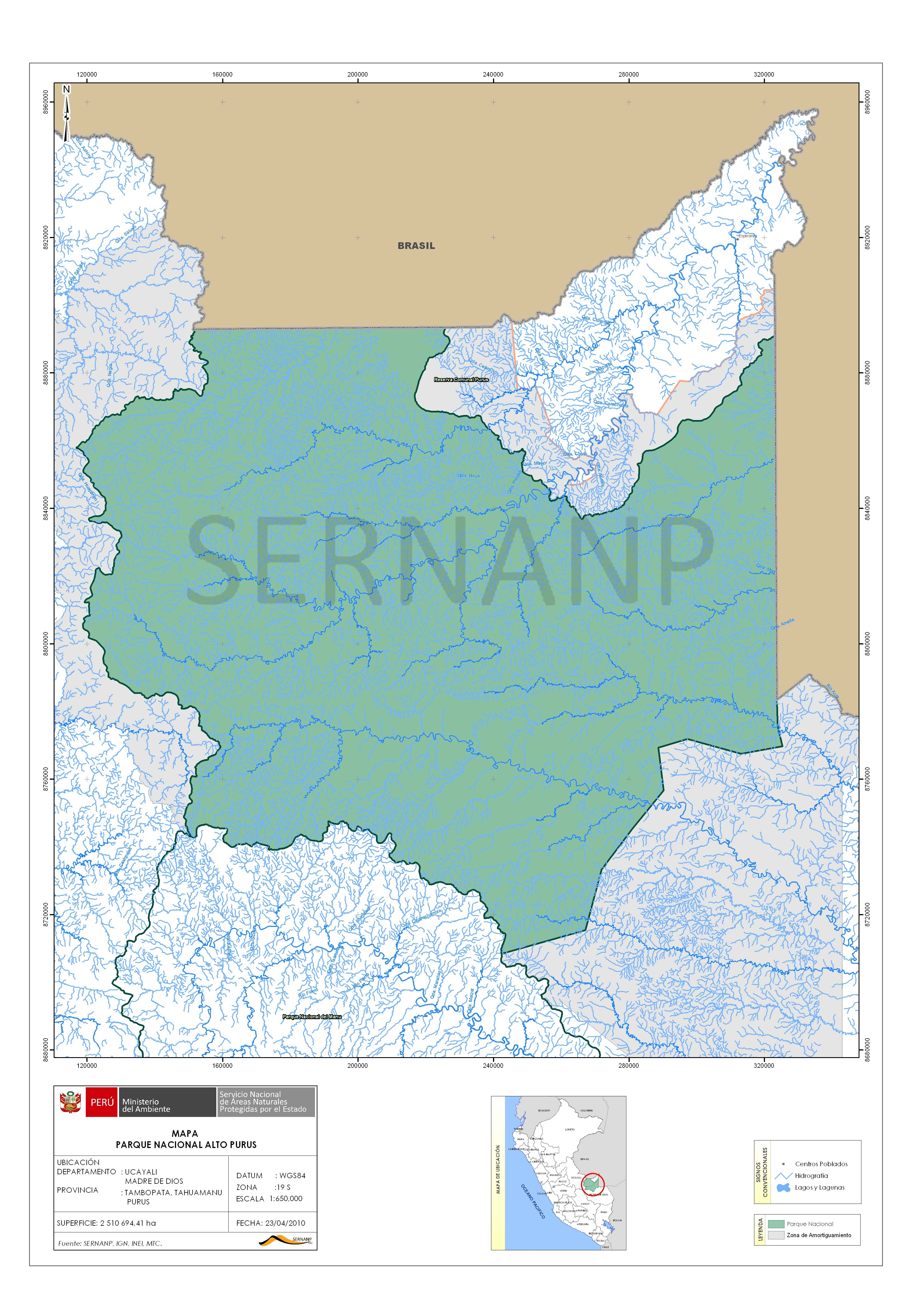
Alto Purús National Park. Official map.

=== Fauna ===
Mammals found in the park include: the jaguar, the bicolored-spined porcupine, the puma, the tapeti, the giant otter, the red brocket, the tayra, the pacarana, the short-eared dog, the giant anteater, the green acouchi, the greater grison, the Amazon dwarf squirrel, the Amazon river dolphin, the emperor tamarin, the South American coati, the coppery titi, etc.

About 520 bird species have been reported in the park including: the blue-headed macaw, Spix's guan, the bat falcon, the red-bellied macaw, the sunbittern, the spangled cotinga, the king vulture, the white-necked jacobin, Chapman's swift, the ocellated poorwill, the pygmy antwren, the white-throated toucan, the jabiru, the golden-tailed sapphire, the Amazon kingfisher, the harpy eagle, the red-necked woodpecker, the scarlet macaw, the Amazonian royal flycatcher, etc.

== Activities ==
Nature watching is the main activity in the area. It is possible to see several bird species gather at mineral licks (colpas), such as parrots and macaws. Cultural tourism can be done in the native villages along Curanja River, where local dances, fish farming and traditional agricultural practices can be observed.

== Environmental issues ==
The main threats to the park are: logging (especially of mahogany), hunting, overfishing, illegal settlements (promoted by corrupt local authorities), lack of park management and contact with peoples in voluntary isolation. In addition, some local groups support the construction of a road to the town of Esperanza, which will pass through the park.
