= Cerro El Cono =

Mountain in Peru

- The Cone
- Location within Peru

Highest point
- Elevation: 518 m (1,699 ft)
- Prominence: 218 m (715 ft)
- Listing: List of mountains in Peru
- Coordinates: 7°57′46.8″S 73°46′56.1″W

Naming
- English translation: The Cone
- Pronunciation: Spanish pronunciation: [el ˈkono]

Geography
- Location: Sierra del Divisor National Park
- Country: Peru
- Department: Ucayali

Geology
- Formed by: Volcanic activity
- Rock age: 5 million years

Climbing
- First ascent: Never
- Access: Prohibited

Cerro El Cono (literally: "Cone Hill") is a mountain located in the Sierra del Divisor National Park in the Ucayali Department of Peru. The mountain has never been climbed and access is prohibited due to its proximity to uncontacted tribes in the Amazon rainforest.

== Geography and geology ==
Cerro El Cono is located in the Ucayali department of Peru near the Brazil–Peru border and the Ucayali River. Since the 1990s, it has been a part of the Sierra del Divisor National Park, a conservation area. Accessing the mountain is difficult due to its remote location in the Amazon rainforest. It rains often at El Cono.

El Cono is 218 meters (715 ft) tall and rises to an elevation of 518 meters (1,699 ft). El Cono is the middle of a cluster of three conical or spine-like hills, e.g. Cerro Bullón, found in the Cerro San Lucas 1:100,000 quadrangle. El Cono and the other hills were visited by geologists of the Standard Oil Company in 1926 and 1962. The analyses of samples that these geologists collected from these hills found that they are volcanic necks composed of five million-year-old porphyritic volcanic rocks including (1) sodalite melanite phonolite, (2) nepheline melanite phonolite, and (3) alkali trachyte.

== Religious significance ==
El Cono is held as a sacred mountain by Indigenous communities near it. Local traditions believe that El Cono has an apu, or a spirit, that protects those who live near it. Uncontacted tribes such as the Iskonawa live near El Cono. Unfounded conspiracy theories claim that the El Cono is a pyramid built by a lost civilization.

== Flora and fauna ==
El Cono is covered by a dense forest of trees. Several endangered species, including the giant armadillo, white-bellied spider monkey, and jaguar, live in and around Cerro El Cono.

== See also ==
- List of mountains in Peru
