= Bahuaja-Sonene National Park =

- Parque Nacional Bahuaja-Sonene (Spanish)
- IUCN category II (national park)
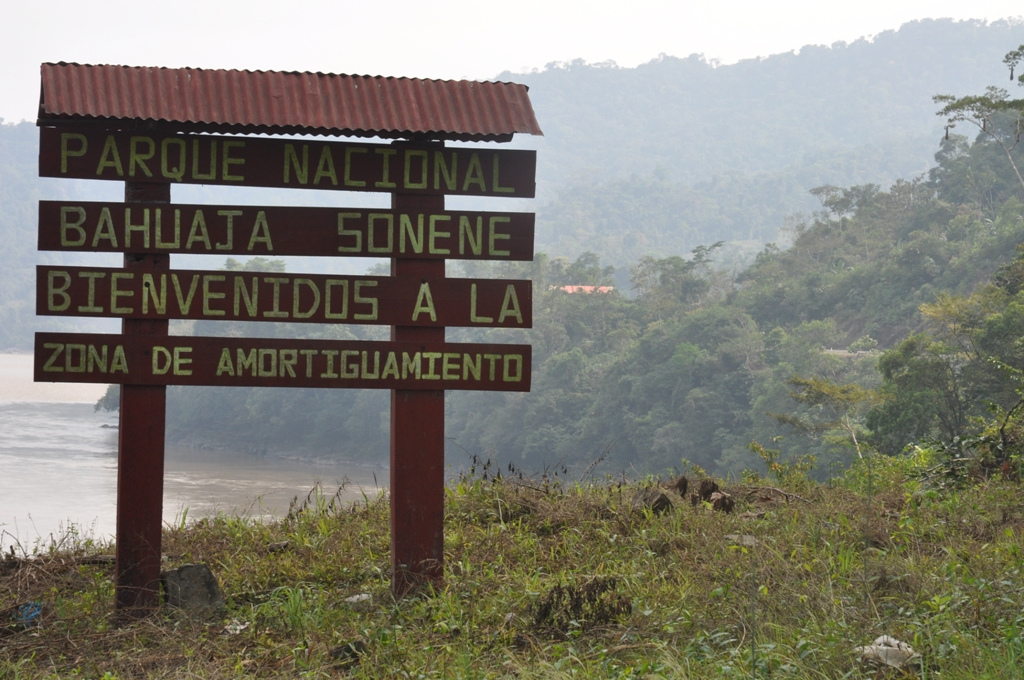
- Signboard at the entrance of the buffer zone. Bahuaja Sonene National Park.

- Location within Peru
- Interactive map of Bahuaja-Sonene National Park
- Location: Peru; Madre de Dios, Puno
- Nearest city: Puerto Maldonado
- Coordinates: 13°16′S 69°27′W
- Area: 1,091,416 hectares (4,213.98 sq mi)
- Established: 17 July 1996
- Governing body: SERNANP

Bahuaja-Sonene National Park (Spanish: Parque Nacional Bahuaja-Sonene) is a protected area located in the regions of Puno and Madre de Dios, in Peru.

== Geography ==
The park comprises river terraces, hills and mountains, with elevations ranging from 500 to 2450 m. The main rivers in the area are: Heath, Tambopata and Candamo. The park shares borders with Madidi National Park in Bolivia to the east and Tambopata National Reserve to the north.

== Ecology ==
=== Flora ===
Plant species found inside the park include: Virola sebifera, Cedrela odorata, Spondias mombin, Celtis schippii, Bertholletia excelsa, Ficus insipida, Hevea guianensis, Cedrelinga cateniformis, Iriartea deltoidea, Calycophyllum spruceanum, Guadua weberbaueri, Theobroma cacao, Miconia spp., Annona ambotay, Swietenia macrophylla, Myroxylon balsamum, Astrocaryum murumuru, Enterolobium cyclocarpum, Mauritia flexuosa, etc.

=== Fauna ===
Birds found inside the park include: the white-tailed goldenthroat, the Neotropic cormorant, the blue-and-yellow macaw, the harpy eagle, the white-throated toucan, the horned curassow, the great egret, the scarlet macaw, the bat falcon, the jabiru, the swallow-tailed hummingbird, etc.

Mammals found in the park include: the giant otter, the South American tapir, the marsh deer, the jaguar, the maned wolf, the puma, the bush dog, etc.

King vulture (Sarcoramphus papa).

A flock of blue-headed parrots (Pionus menstruus).

Striolated-Puffbird (Nystalus).

A flock of macaws (Ara macao and Ara ararauna).

== Environmental issues ==
The park is rich in natural resources including timber, gold, rubber, and wild game. The Candamo deposit (Block 78), which contains 3 trillion cubic feet (85 km^{3}) of natural gas and 120 million of barrels of natural gas condensates, was formerly owned by Mobil and now lies partly within the reserve. Legislation proposed in 2007 to remove the block from the reserve was turned down.
