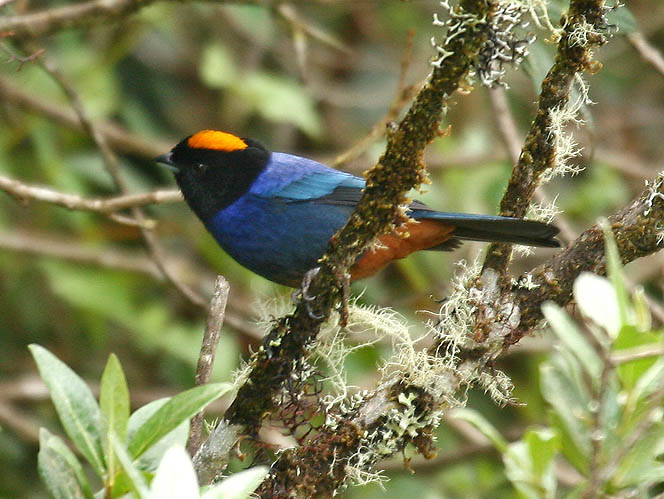

Conservation status
- Least Concern (IUCN 3.1)

Scientific classification
- Kingdom: Animalia
- Phylum: Chordata
- Class: Aves
- Order: Passeriformes
- Family: Thraupidae
- Genus: Iridosornis
- Species: I. rufivertex

Binomial name
- Iridosornis rufivertex (Lafresnaye, 1842)

= Golden-crowned tanager =

Species of bird

The golden-crowned tanager (Iridosornis rufivertex) is a species of bird in the family Thraupidae.

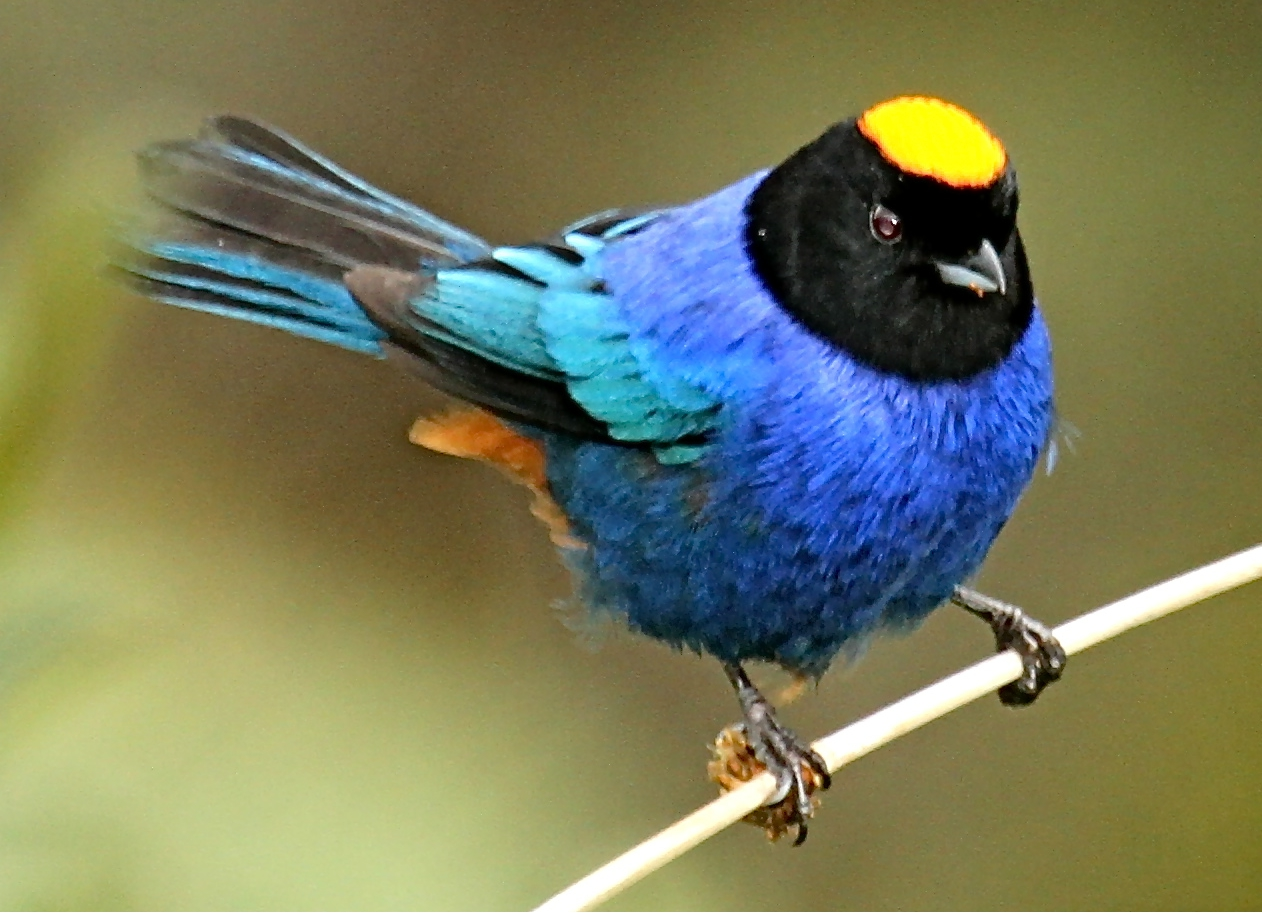
Acanama Reserve - Ecuador

It is found in Colombia, Ecuador, Peru, and Venezuela. Its natural habitat is subtropical or tropical moist montane forests.
