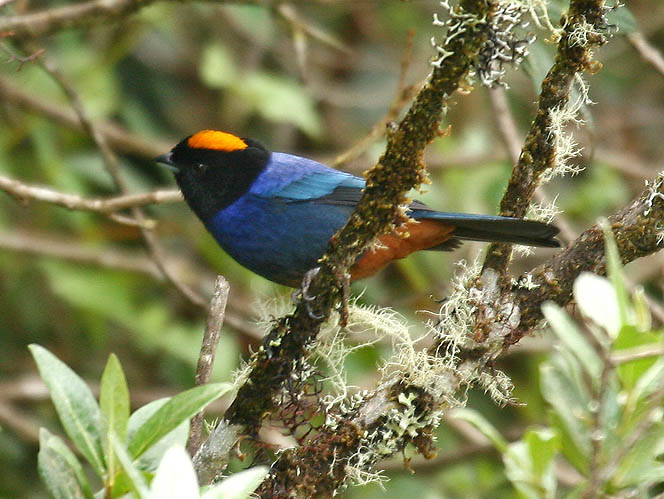
- Golden-crowned tanager (I. rufivertex)

Scientific classification
- Kingdom: Animalia
- Phylum: Chordata
- Class: Aves
- Order: Passeriformes
- Family: Thraupidae
- Genus: Iridosornis; Lesson, 1844

Type species
- Arremon rufivertex Lafresnaye, 1842

Species
- See text

= Iridosornis =

Genus of birds

Iridosornis is a genus of Neotropical birds in the tanager family Thraupidae

These birds live in the Andes mostly at high altitudes. Their plumage is mainly blue and all of them have contrasting patches of yellow.

== Taxonomy and species list ==
The genus Iridosornis was introduced in 1844 by the French naturalist René Lesson with the golden-crowned tanager as the type species. The genus name comes from Ancient Greek ἶρις (îris), meaning "rainbow", and ὄρνις (órnis), meaning "bird", and thus, "rainbow bird". A molecular phylogenetic study published in 2014 found that this genus had a sister relationship to the vermilion tanager which is placed in its own monospecific genus Calochaetes.

The genus contains the following five species:

Genus Iridosornis – Lesson, 1844 – five species
Common name	Scientific name and subspecies	Range	Size and ecology	IUCN status and estimated population
Purplish-mantled tanager	Iridosornis porphyrocephalus Sclater, PL, 1856	Colombia and Ecuador	Size: Habitat: Diet:	LC
Yellow-throated tanager	Iridosornis analis (Tschudi, 1844)	Colombia, Ecuador, and Peru	Size: Habitat: Diet:	LC
Golden-collared tanager	Iridosornis jelskii Cabanis, 1873	Bolivia and Peru	Size: Habitat: Diet:	LC
Golden-crowned tanager	Iridosornis rufivertex (Lafresnaye, 1842)	Colombia, Ecuador, Peru, and Venezuela	Size: Habitat: Diet:	LC
Yellow-scarfed tanager	Iridosornis reinhardti Sclater, PL, 1865	Peru	Size: Habitat: Diet:	LC
