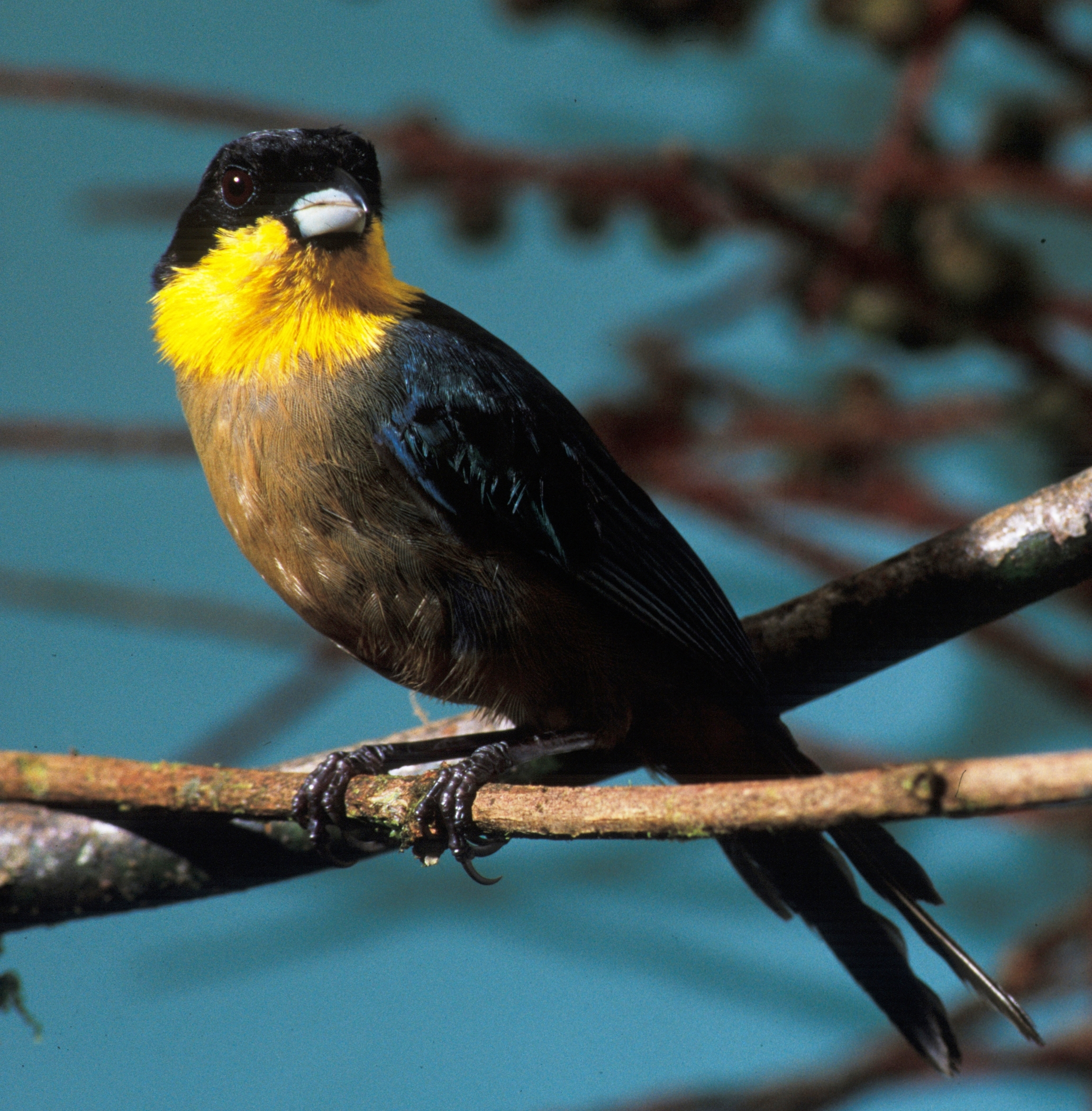

Conservation status
- Least Concern (IUCN 3.1)

Scientific classification
- Kingdom: Animalia
- Phylum: Chordata
- Class: Aves
- Order: Passeriformes
- Family: Thraupidae
- Genus: Iridosornis
- Species: I. analis

Binomial name
- Iridosornis analis (Tschudi, 1844)

Audio
- Song of yellow-throated tanager

= Yellow-throated tanager =

Species of bird

The yellow-throated tanager (Iridosornis analis) is a species of bird in the family Thraupidae. It is found in Colombia, Ecuador, and Peru. Its natural habitat is subtropical or tropical moist montane forests.
