= Manu National Park =

National park in Peru

- IUCN category II (national park)
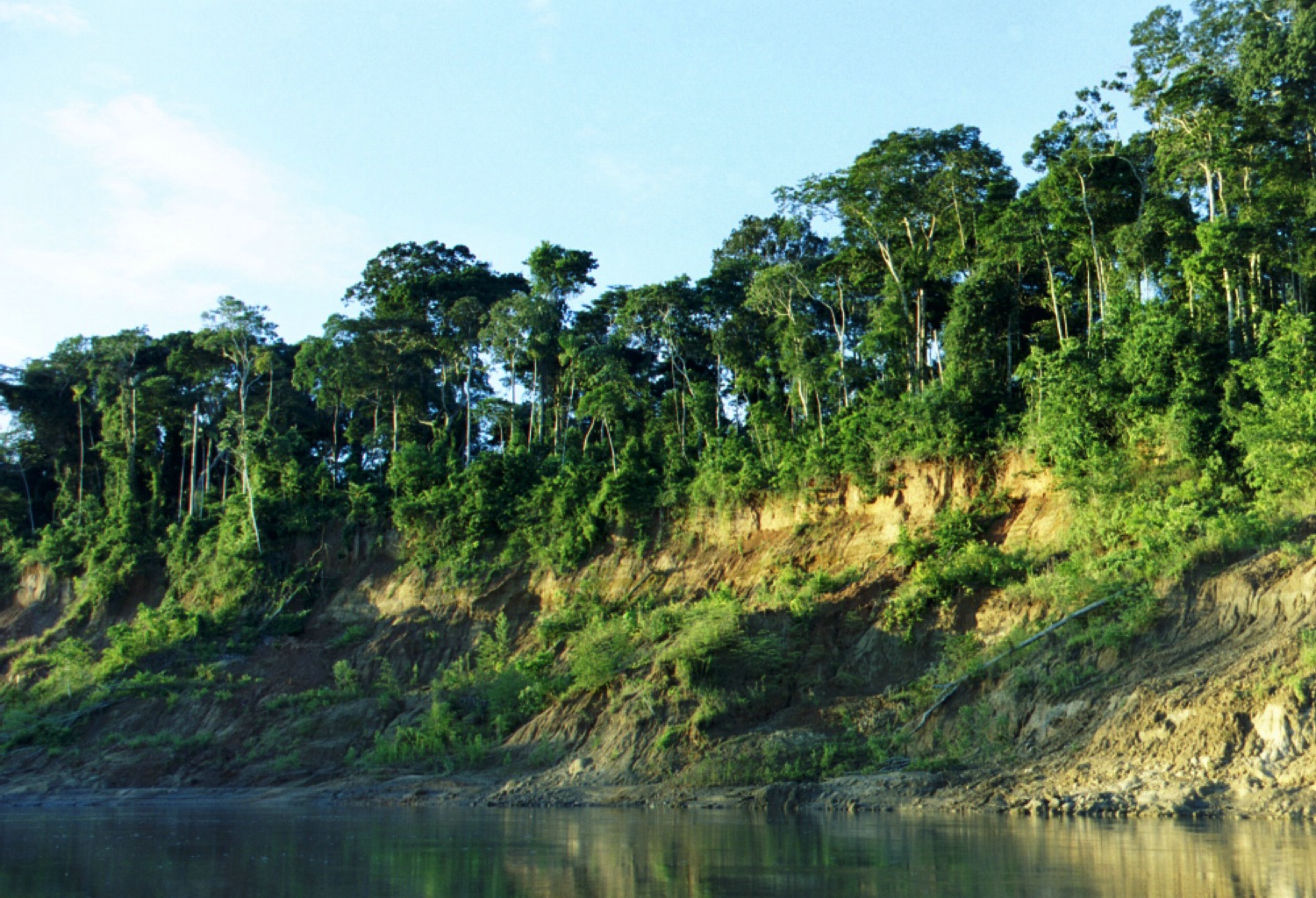
- View of a riverbank in Manu National Park

- Location within Peru
- Interactive map of Manu National Park
- Location: Peru; Madre de Dios Region, Cusco Region
- Nearest city: Cusco
- Coordinates: 11°51′23″S 71°43′17″W
- Area: 17,162.95 km^{2} (6,626.65 sq mi)
- Established: May 29, 1973 (by 644-73-AG)
- Governing body: SERNANP
- Website: Parque Nacional del Manu

UNESCO World Heritage Site
- Criteria: Natural: (ix), (x)
- Reference: 402bis
- Inscription: 1987 (11th Session)
- Extensions: 2009
- Area: 1,716,295.22 ha (4,241,057.9 acres)

Manu National Park (Spanish: Parque Nacional del Manu) is a national park and biosphere reserve located in the regions of Madre de Dios and Cusco in Peru. It protects a diverse number of ecosystems including lowland rainforests, cloud forests and Andean grasslands.

== History ==
Manu National Park was established by decree on 29 May 1973; during the dictatorship of General Juan Velasco. In 1977, UNESCO recognised it as a Biosphere Reserve and in 1987, as a World Heritage Site. In 2002, the Peruvian government increased the extension of the park to its current area.

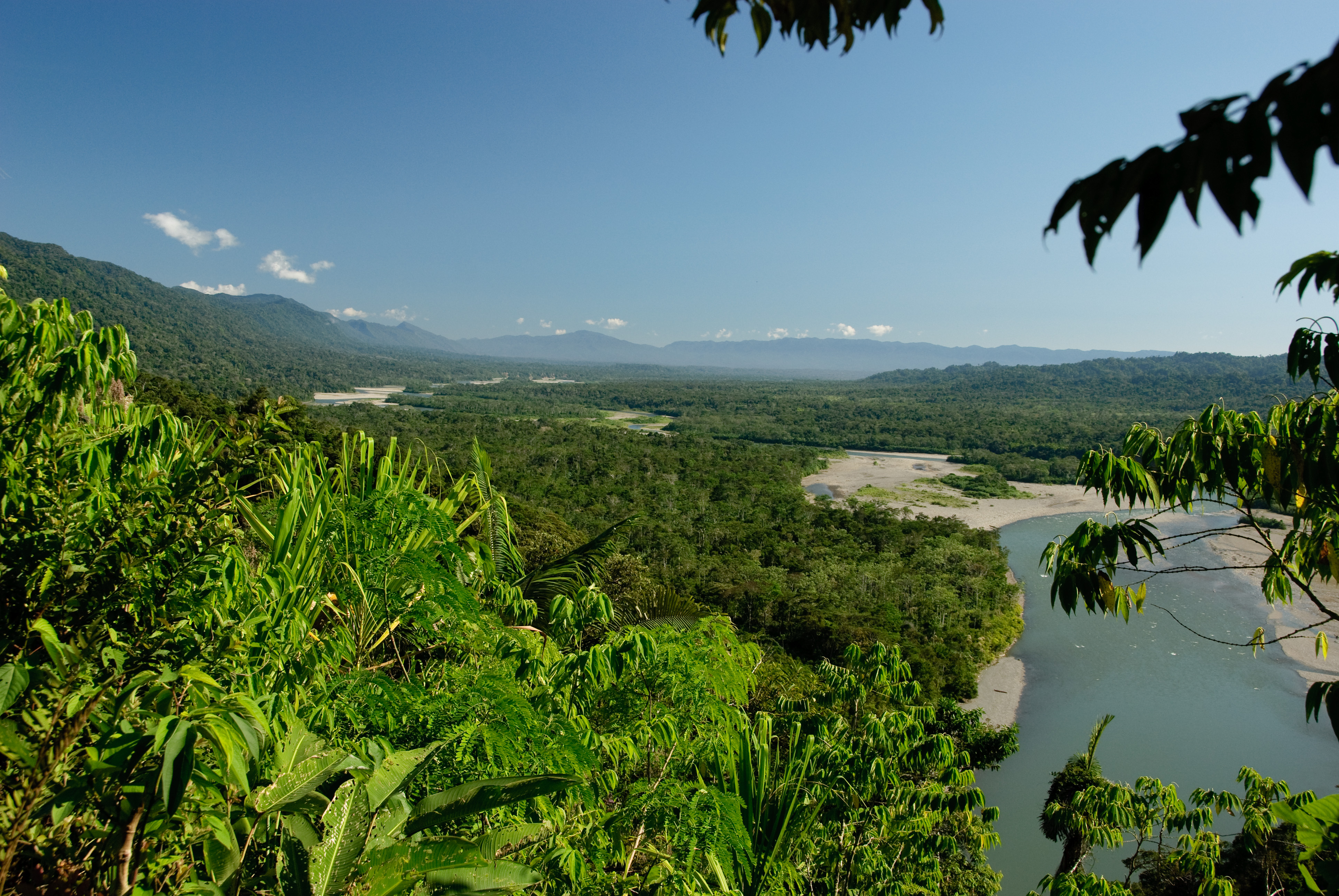
River in Manu National Park

== Geography ==
Manu National Park covers an area of 1,716,295.22 hectares (17,162.95 km^{2}) which comprises mountainous areas (traversed by creeks and valleys) with elevations close to 4000 m above sea level and a portion of the Amazon basin plains.

The national park is divided in the following areas: the restricted use zone (with pristine forests and native communities, access is granted to researchers only); the reserved zone (for recreation and research); the recuperation zone (for the recovery of disturbed areas) and the cultural zone (for human settlement and most activities including nature tourism).

The 190 kilometres (120 mi) Manu road is the only link between the highlands of the park and the lowlands where the mouth of the Manu River is located.

== Climate ==
Climate in the park is highly variable, with the amount of rain depending on the elevation. The southern section (mountainous) has an annual precipitation between 1500–2000 mm; while in the middle section it is between 3000–3500 mm and in the northwestern section the annual precipitation reaches 8000 mm or more. The less rainy season is from May to September, accompanied by lower temperatures.

In the park, the mean annual temperature in the lowland rainforest is 25.6 °C, while in the Andean zone it is 8 °C.

== Ecology ==
=== Plants ===
Vegetation types inside the park include puna grassland (in areas over 4000 m), high Andean forests, cloud forests and lowland Amazon rainforest. This variety of vegetation types is represented in 162 families, 1191 genera and 4385 identified species of plants, with as much as 250 tree species in one hectare. A study found a total of 1108 species of trees inside the park, from several plots between the mountain tree line and the lowland forest.

Plant species found in the lowland rainforest zone of the park include: Bertholletia excelsa, Nectandra spp., Cedrelinga cateniformis, Socratea exorrhiza, Eugenia spp., Cedrela odorata, Brosimum lactescens, Iriartea deltoidea, Protium spp., Poulsenia armata, Cecropia spp., Inga spp., Margaritaria nobilis, Ceiba samauma, Solanum grandiflorum, Annona excellens, Calophyllum brasiliense, Simarouba amara, Maxillaria spp., Virola calophylla, Ficus spp., Trema micrantha, Hevea brasiliensis, Piper spp., Mauritia flexuosa, Clusia spp., Euterpe precatoria, Jacaranda copaia, Aenigmanu sp., etc. Plant species found in the mountain zones in the park include: Podocarpus oleifolius, Prunus integrifolia, Cyrtochilum aureum, Escallonia myrtilloides, Hesperomeles ferruginea, Otoglossum scansor, Baccharis salicifolia, Cinchona pubescens, Oreopanax spp., Polylepis spp., Alnus acuminata, Retrophyllum rospigliosii, Vallea stipularis, etc.

=== Fauna ===
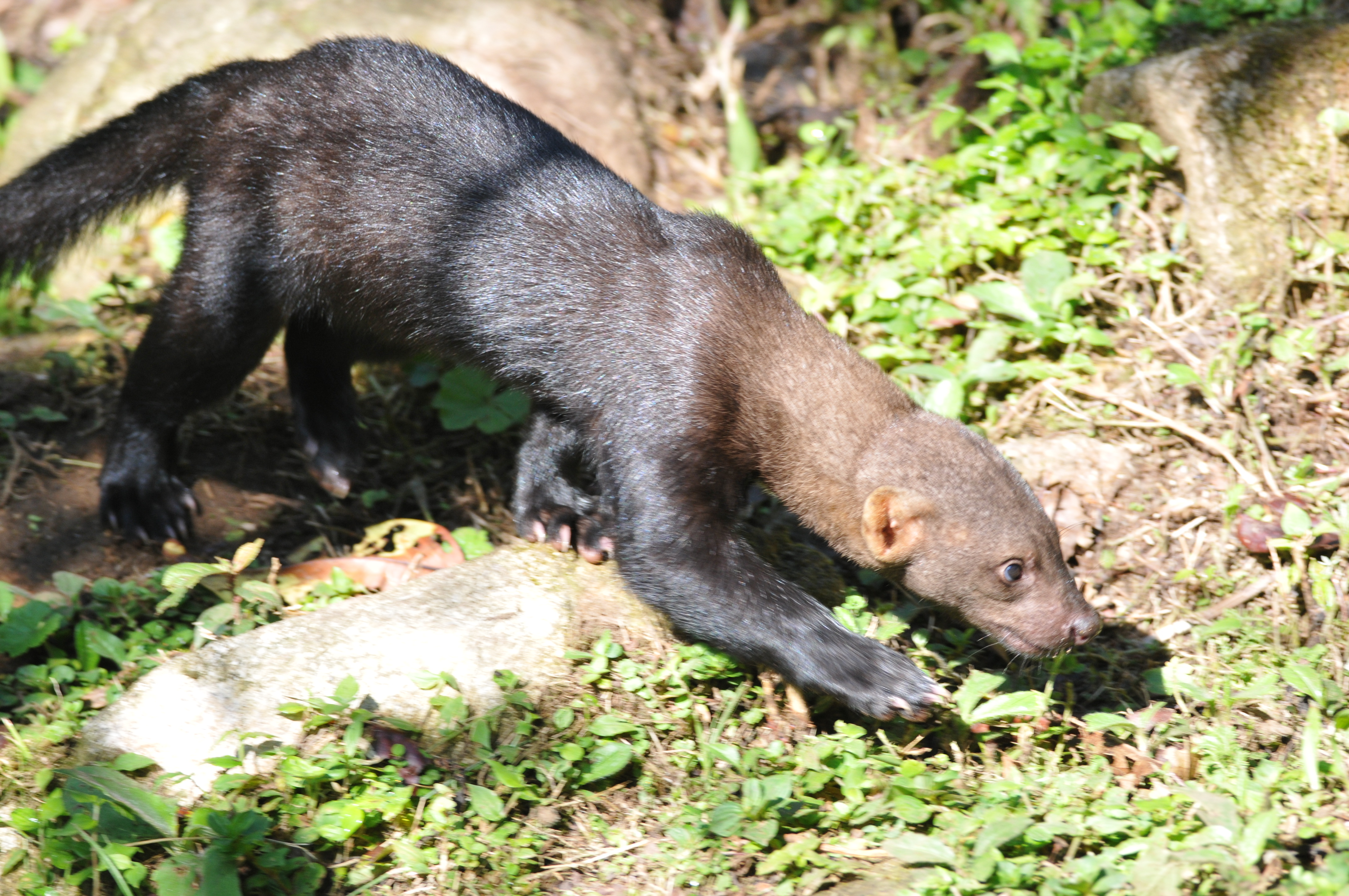
Wild tayra at Manu National Park

About 160 species of mammals have been reported in the park. Mammals found in the lowland rainforest zone of the park include: the jaguar, the tayra, the giant armadillo, the puma (also present in mountainous areas), the ocelot, the collared peccary, the giant otter, the Peruvian spider monkey, the Mexican free-tailed bat, the jaguarundi, the capybara, the tufted capuchin, the white-lipped peccary, the greater bulldog bat, the Southern Amazon red squirrel, the marsh deer, the water opossum, the red brocket, the brown-throated sloth, the black-capped squirrel monkey, the South American tapir, the southern tamandua, the moustached tamarin, the pacarana, etc. Mammals reported from mountain zones in the park include: the white-tailed deer, the Andean fox, the mountain paca, the long-tailed weasel, the montane guinea pig, the spectacled bear, etc.

More than 1000 bird species have been estimated to exist in the park. Birds reported for the lowland rainforest in the park include: the great tinamou, Spix's guan, the rufescent tiger-heron, the blue-and-yellow macaw, the silvery grebe, the harpy eagle, the long-billed starthroat, the snowy egret, the king vulture, the scarlet macaw, the roseate spoonbill, the blue-crowned trogon, the turquoise tanager, the Amazonian pygmy owl, the blue-headed parrot, etc. Birds present in the mountain zones in the park include: the Andean tinamou, the great horned owl, the torrent duck, the yellow-billed pintail, the amethyst-throated sunangel, the Andean guan, the puna ibis, the golden-collared tanager, the Andean condor, the collared inca, the solitary eagle, the Andean cock-of-the-rock, the mountain caracara, the mitred parakeet, the sapphire-vented puffleg, the giant hummingbird, etc.

The 155 amphibian species found in the park include: Atelopus erythropus, Bolitoglossa altamazonica, Chiasmocleis ventrimaculata, Dendropsophus acreanus, Dendropsophus koechlini, Dendropsophus rhodopeplus, Hyalinobatrachium bergeri, Leptodactylus didymus, Oreobates cruralis, Oscaecilia bassleri, Pipa pipa, Pristimantis buccinator, Pristimantis cosnipatae, Pristimantis danae, Pristimantis olivaceus, Rhinella veraguensis, Telmatobius timens, etc.

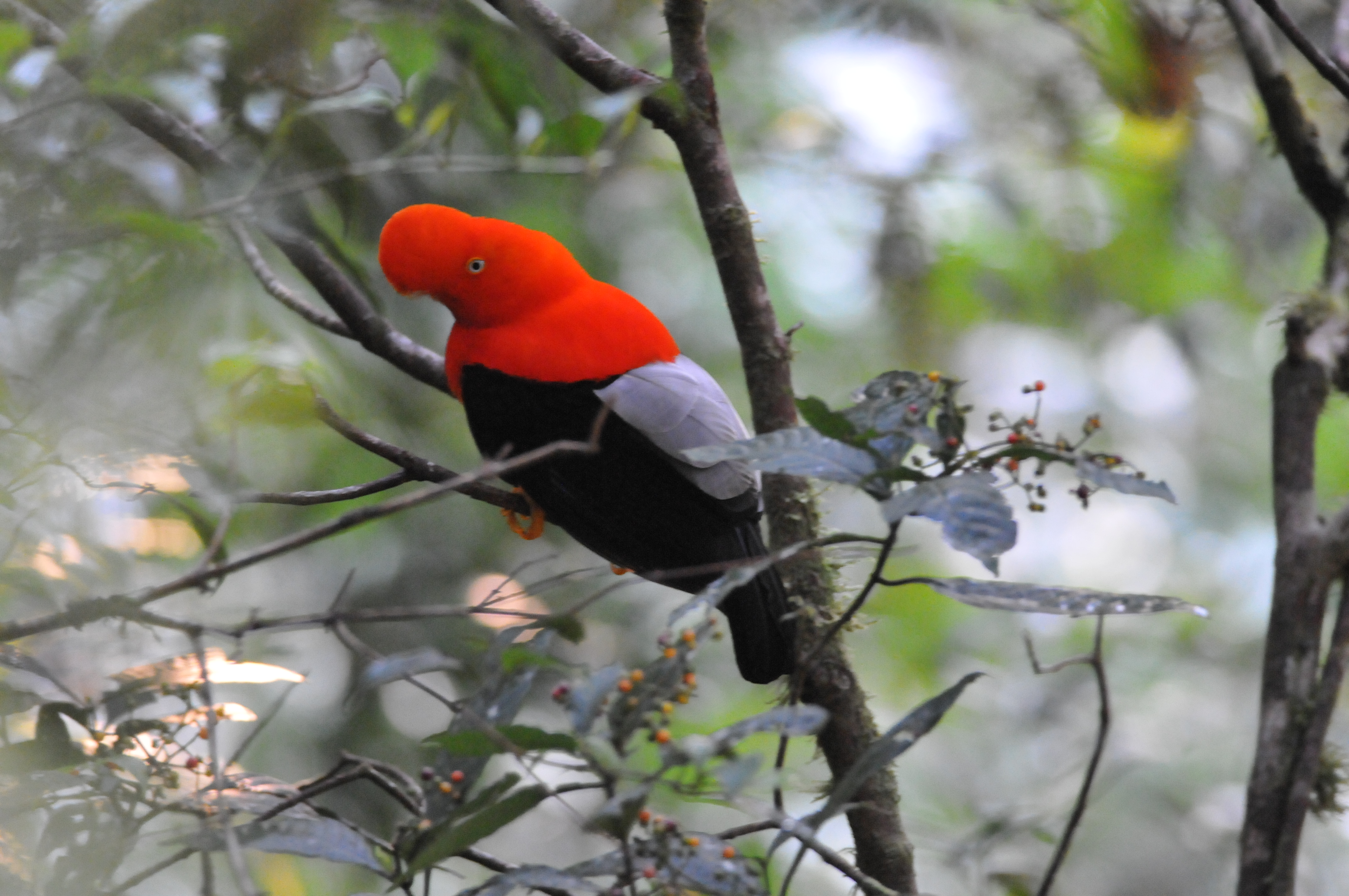
Andean cock-of-the-rock at Manu National Park.

There are 132 species of reptiles in the park including: the spectacled caiman, the black caiman, the northern caiman lizard, the mata mata, the boa, the shushupe, the green anaconda, the tree boa, the yellow-spotted river turtle, the lancehead, the aquatic coral snake, etc.

In addition, 210 species of fish, 300 species of ants, 650 species of beetles, 136 species of dragonflies and more than 1300 species of butterflies have been reported in the park so far.

== Anthropology ==
Among the native peoples living inside the park are: Yora, Mashco-Piro, Matsiguenka, Harakmbut and Yine; plus other human groups living in voluntary isolation.

== Facilities ==
There are five areas open to tourists where local biodiversity can be watched along paths, swamps, oxbow lakes and river shores. In the lower basin of Manu river there are also: 5 camping sites, 4 viewing points (one of them an 18 m tower), 3 lodges and a canopy walkway.

Scientific research is also done at the park, with many research centers in or around the area.

== See also ==
- Petroglyphs of Pusharo
