= Yaguas National Park =

National park in Peru

- IUCN category II (national park)
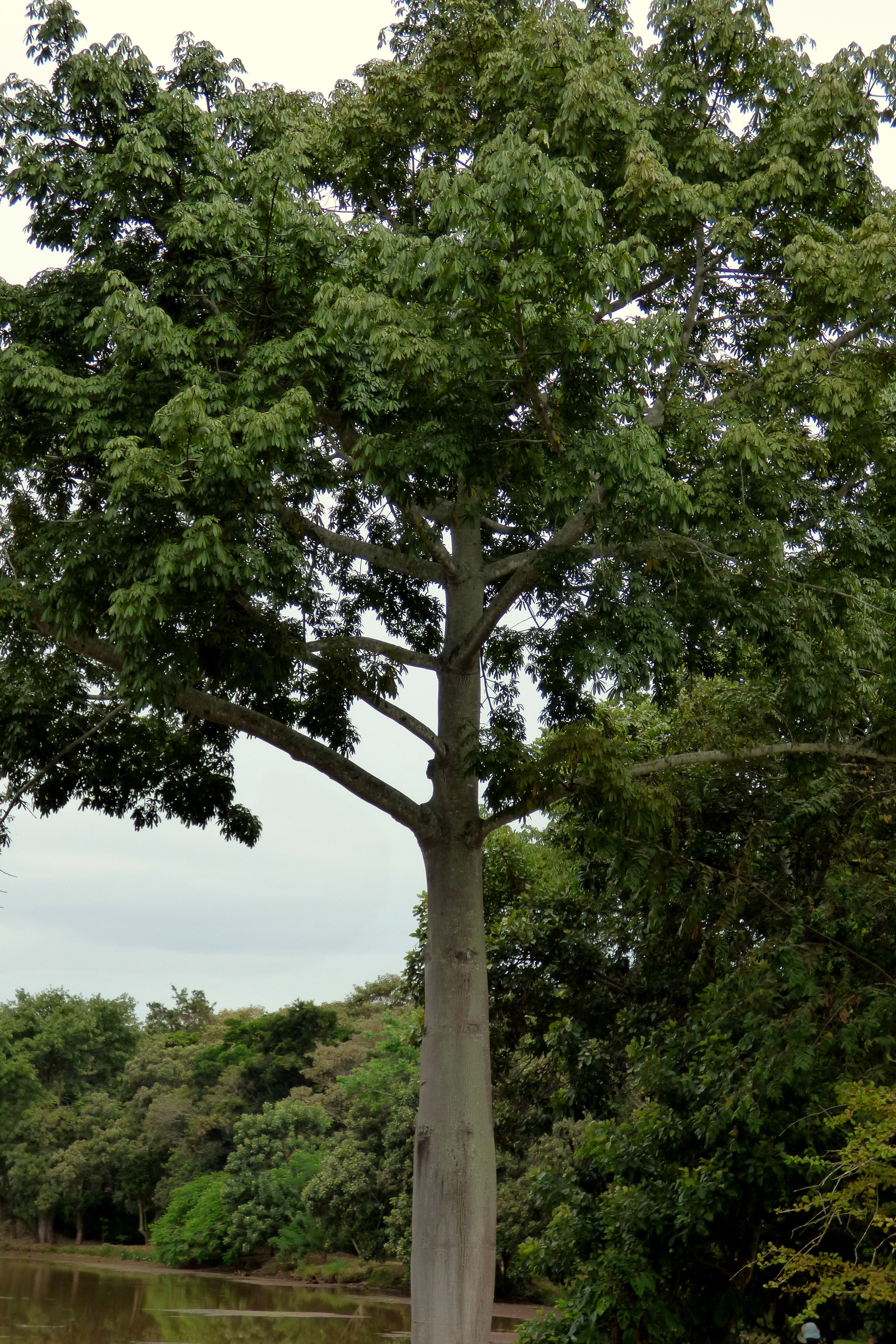
- Ceiba pentandra, one of the species found in the Yaguas National Park

- Location within Peru
- Location: Peru; Loreto
- Nearest city: Iquitos, Loreto
- Coordinates: 2°55′0″S 71°31′16″W
- Established: 10 January 2018
- Governing body: SERNANP
- Website: Parque Nacional Yaguas

Yaguas National Park was created on January 11, 2018 and is located in the Loreto Region of Peru near the border with Colombia. It covers an area of 8,689 km^{2} (2,147,100 acres) of tropical forest. Along with Río Puré, Cahuinarí and Amacayacu National Park in Colombia, as well as the Regional Conservation Areas Maijuna Kichwa and Ampiyacu Apayacu in Peru, it is part of a huge biological corridor.

== Climate ==
The climate is tropical with an average temperature of 31 °C and a relative humidity of 80% all year. The daily precipitation varies from 3.5 mm in August to 9.5 mm in March. The average yearly precipitation is 2827 mm.

== Fauna ==
There are approximately 600 species of birds, 150 species of mammals, 110 species of amphibians, and 100 species of reptiles in the national park, such as brown woolly monkey, anteater, South American tapir, giant otter, Amazonian manatee, Amazon river dolphin, caiman, and yellow-footed tortoise. More than 300 species of fish are also found in the park, among them fish that cross the forest not swimming nor floating down a river, feeding on fruits and living in branches and Arapaima gigas, the largest freshwater fish in the world.

== Flora ==
More than 3,500 species of plants abound in the park, among them Hura crepitans, Cedrelinga cateniformis, Simarouba amara, Macrolobium acaciaefolium and Ceiba pentandra.
