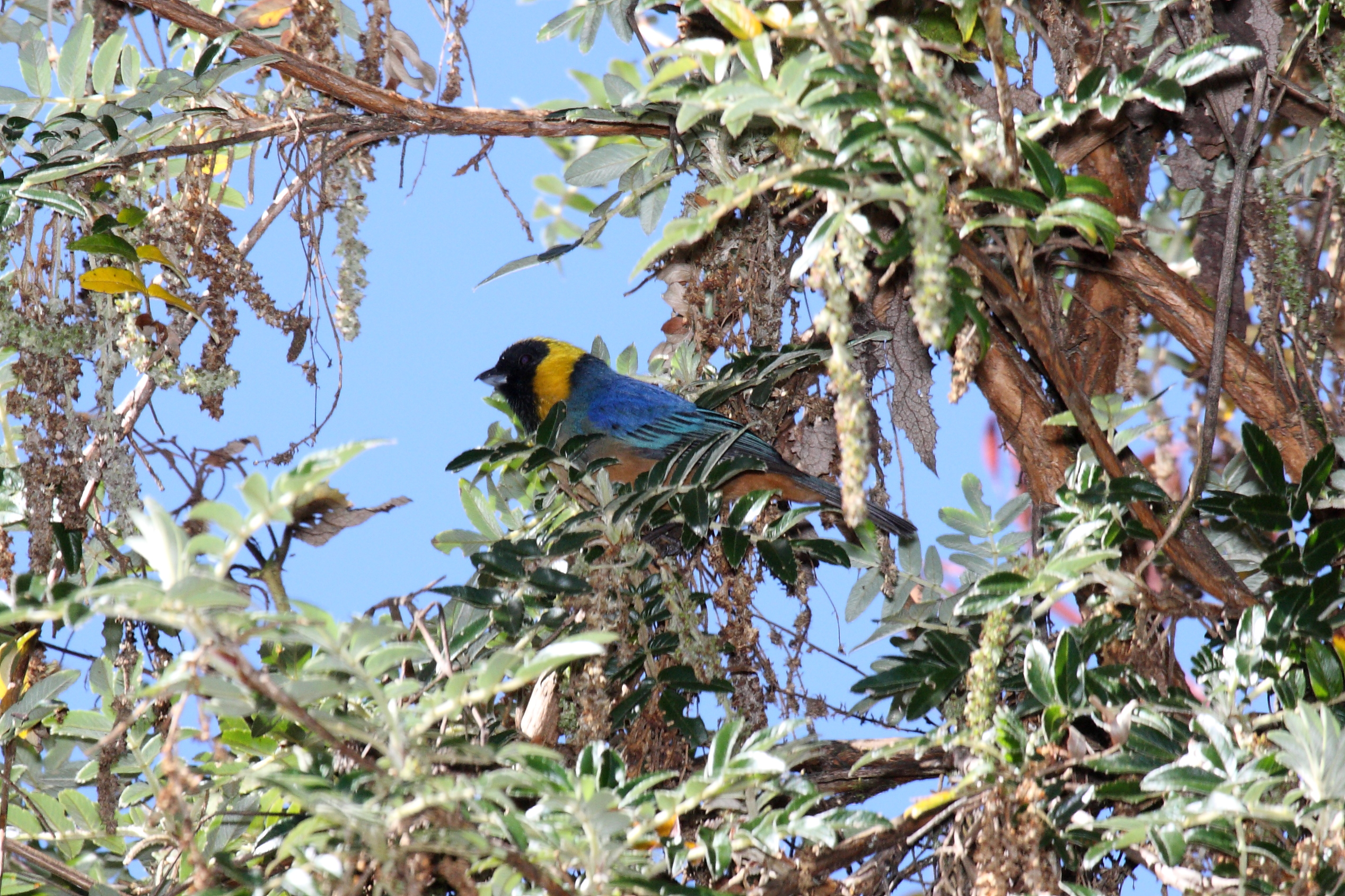

Conservation status
- Least Concern (IUCN 3.1)

Scientific classification
- Kingdom: Animalia
- Phylum: Chordata
- Class: Aves
- Order: Passeriformes
- Family: Thraupidae
- Genus: Iridosornis
- Species: I. jelskii

Binomial name
- Iridosornis jelskii Cabanis, 1873

= Golden-collared tanager =

Species of bird

The golden-collared tanager (Iridosornis jelskii) is a species of bird in the family Thraupidae. It is found in Bolivia and Peru. Its natural habitat is subtropical or tropical moist montane forests.
