= Ichigkat Muja – Cordillera del Condor National Park =

National park in Peru

Ichigkat muja – Cordillera del Condor National Park
- IUCN category II (national park)
- Location within Peru
- Interactive map of Ichigkat muja – Cordillera del Condor National Park
- Location: Peru; Amazonas Region, Condorcanqui Province
- Coordinates: 3°23′34″S 78°6′49″W
- Area: 88,477 hectares (341.61 sq mi)
- Established: 10 August 2007
- Governing body: SERNANP
- Website: Parque Nacional Ichigkat Muja – Cordillera del Cóndor (in Spanish)

The Ichigkat Muja – Cordillera del Condor National Park (Spanish: Parque Nacional Ichigkat muja – Cordillera del Cóndor) is a protected area in Peru located in the region of Amazonas. It protects part of the Eastern Andes forests at the Cordillera del Condor mountain range.

== Geography ==
Cordillera del Condor National Park is located in the region of Amazonas, in northern Peru, next to the border with Ecuador. The main geographic feature is the Cordillera del Condor, a forested mountain range with moderate to steep slopes, that occupies almost 90% of the park area. The rest of the area is occupied by low hills and river terraces, being the main watercourses the Cenepa and the Santiago rivers. The highest elevation in the park is ca. 2500 m.

Coangos

Climate chart (precipitation, max. and min. temperature)
J	F	M	A	M	J	J	A	S	O	N	D
210 25 14	174 26 14	252 25 14	311 26 15	317 25 15	382 25 15	333 24 14	276 25 14	243 25 15	248 26 15	241 27 15	204 27 15
- █ Average max. and min. temperatures in °C
- █ Precipitation totals in mm
- Source: Climate-Data.org
Imperial conversion
J	F	M	A	M	J	J	A	S	O	N	D
8.3 78 58	6.9 78 58	9.9 77 58	12 78 58	12 77 58	15 76 58	13 75 58	11 76 57	9.6 77 58	9.8 79 59	9.5 81 58	8 80 58
- █ Average max. and min. temperatures in °F
- █ Precipitation totals in inches

== Climate ==
Cordillera del Condor National Park has a wet tropical climate. The climograph data corresponds to the village of Coangos, in Ecuador (1576 m of elevation), just outside the national park and near the Peruvian border.

== Ecology ==
This national park protects part of the Eastern Cordillera Real montane forests ecoregion. These forests grow smaller as elevation increases, becoming cloud forests at high elevations and dwarf forests at mountain tops.

=== Flora ===
Some of the plant species present in the area are: Alchornea triplinervia, Miconia spp., Piper aduncum, Iriartea deltoidea, Anthurium spp., Solanum grandiflorum, Inga spp., Uncaria tomentosa, Ochroma pyramidale, Minquartia guianensis, Eryngium foetidum, Perebea guianensis, Socratea exorrhiza, Cedrelinga cateniformis, Weinmannia spp., Calathea loeseneri, Palicourea spp., Oenocarpus bataua, Clethra castaneifolia, Gynerium sagittatum, Senna alata, etc.

=== Fauna ===
Some of the birds present in the park are: the Andean cock-of-the-rock, the oilbird, the white-throated toucan, the blue-and-yellow macaw, the ornate hawk-eagle, the green hermit, etc.

Among the mammal species present in the park are: the Venezuelan red howler, the jaguar, the white-lipped peccary, the Amazon dwarf squirrel, the southern tamandua, the neotropical otter, the nine-banded armadillo, etc.

== See also ==
- Aguaruna
