= Sierra del Divisor National Park =

National park in Peru

- Parque Nacional Sierra del Divisor
- IUCN category II (national park)
- Location within Peru
- Location: Peru; Coronel Portillo Province, Ucayali; Ucayali Province, Loreto
- Coordinates: 7°16′31″S 74°04′25″W
- Area: 1,354,485.10 hectares (5,229.6962 sq mi)
- Established: November 8, 2015
- Governing body: SERNANP
- Website: Parque Nacional Sierra del Divisor

Sierra del Divisor National Park (Spanish: Parque Nacional Sierra del Divisor) is a national park in the Amazon rainforest of Peru, established in 2015. It covers an area of 1,354,485.10 ha (13,544.85 km^{2}) in the provinces of Coronel Portillo, in the region of Ucayali and Ucayali, in the region of Loreto.The city of Pucallpa lies on the bank of Ucayali River. In the park lies the pyramid shaped mountain top Cerro El Cono which is honored by the indigenous people as an Andes Apu.
