= Celtis schippii =

Scientific classification
- Kingdom: Plantae
- Clade: Tracheophytes
- Clade: Angiosperms
- Clade: Eudicots
- Clade: Rosids
- Order: Rosales
- Family: Cannabaceae
- Genus: Celtis
- Species: C. schippii

Binomial name
- Celtis schippii Standl.

Species of tree

Celtis schippii is a medium-sized evergreen tree native to the lowland rainforests of Central and South America. It grows up to 10–20 meters high.
