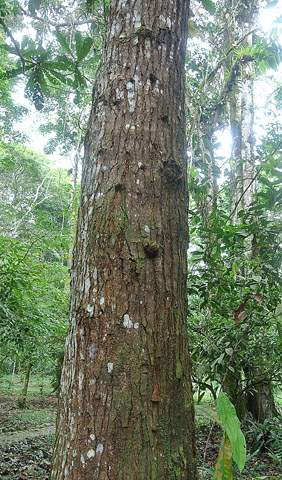
- Trunk of Cedrelinga cateniformis

Conservation status
- Least Concern (IUCN 3.1)

Scientific classification
- Kingdom: Plantae
- Clade: Tracheophytes
- Clade: Angiosperms
- Clade: Eudicots
- Clade: Rosids
- Order: Fabales
- Family: Fabaceae
- Subfamily: Caesalpinioideae
- Clade: Mimosoid clade
- Genus: Cedrelinga; Ducke
- Species: C. cateniformis

Binomial name
- Cedrelinga cateniformis (Ducke) Ducke

Synonyms
- Cedrelinga catenaeformis (Ducke) Ducke; Piptadenia cateniformis Ducke; Pithecellobium cateniformis (Ducke) L. Cárdenas

= Cedrelinga =

Genus of legumes

Cedrelinga is a genus of trees in the family Fabaceae. The only accepted species is Cedrelinga cateniformis, called tornillo or cedrorana, which is native to South America. It is occasionally harvested for its straight-grained timber.
