= Junín National Reserve =

Protected area in Peru

Coordinates: 10°53′14″S 76°09′26″W

Junin National Reserve
- IUCN category VI (protected area with sustainable use of natural resources)
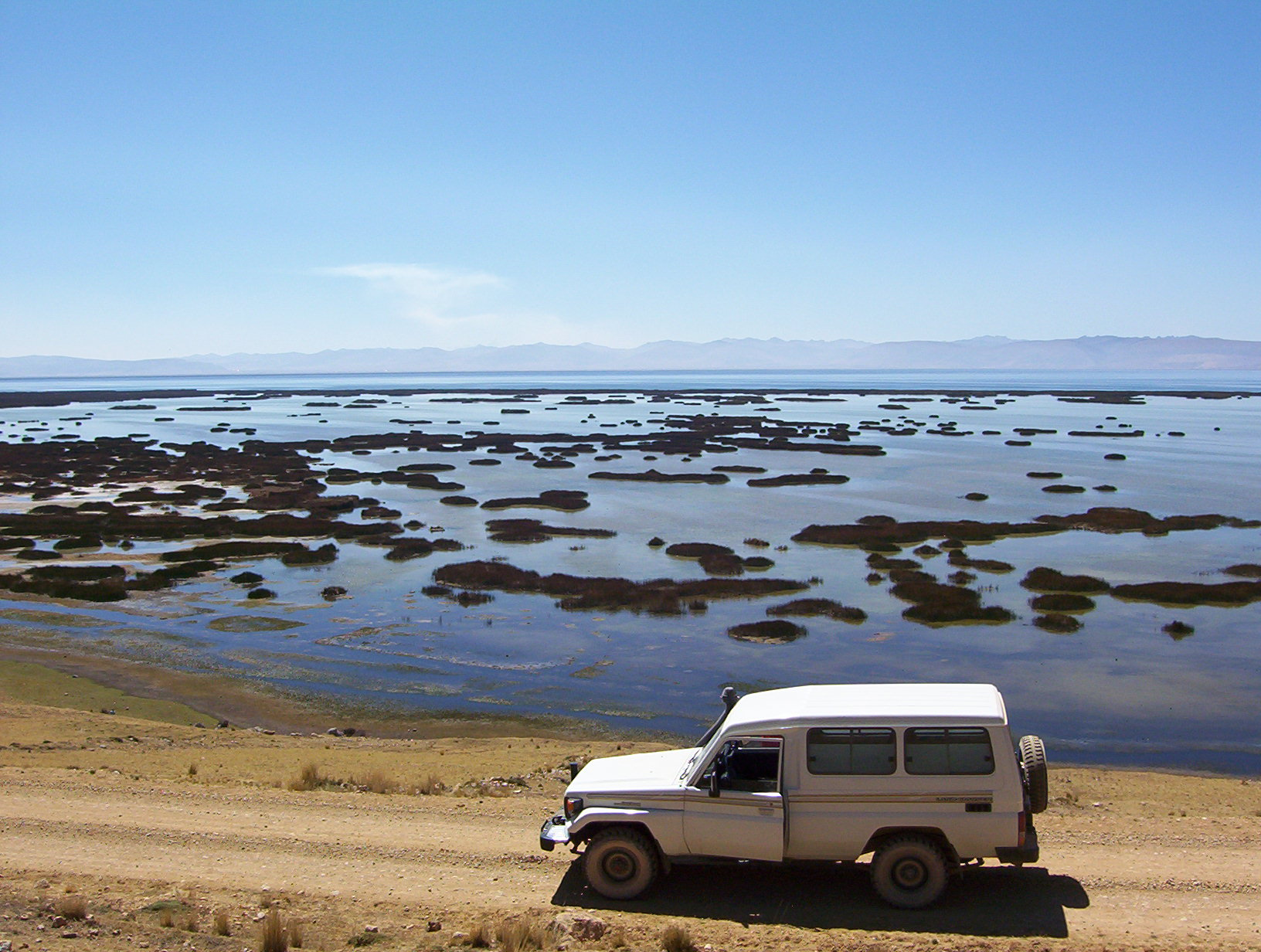
- Partial view of Lake Junin.
- Interactive map of Junin National Reserve
- Location: Peru; Junín
- Area: 25 km^{2} (9.7 sq mi)
- Established: 07 August 1974
- Governing body: SERNANP
- Website: Reserva Nacional de Junín (in Spanish)

Ramsar Wetland
- Official name: Reserva Nacional de Junín
- Designated: 20 January 1997
- Reference no.: 882

Junín National Reserve is a protected area located in the region of Junín, Peru. One of its main purposes is to protect the ecosystem and biodiversity of Lake Junín and the surrounding Central Andean wet puna.

== Ecology ==
=== Flora ===
Land native plant species found in the reserve include: Plantago rigida, Calamagrostis vicunarum, Paranephelius ovatus, Lobelia oligophylla, Baccharis tricuneata, Jarava ichu, Alchemilla pinnata, Festuca dolychophylla, Chuquiraga spinosa, Geranium sessiliflorum, Distichia muscoides, Ribes cuneifolium, Azorella diapensioides, Austrocylindropuntia floccosa, Lupinus brachyphyllus, etc.

Aquatic native plant species found in the reserve include: Schoenoplectus californicus, Elodea potamogeton, Juncus arcticus, Myriophyllum quitense, Chara fragilis, Potamogeton spp., etc.

=== Fauna ===
Some of the birds found in the reserve include: the Junin grebe, the Junin crake (both species endemic to this lake); the Puna teal, the common gallinule, the Andean goose, the Chilean flamingo, the ruddy duck, the yellow-billed pintail, the silvery grebe, the Andean gull, etc.

Among the mammals found in the reserve are: the Andean fox, the northern viscacha, the Molina's hog-nosed skunk, the montane guinea pig, the Pampas cat, the long-tailed weasel, etc.
