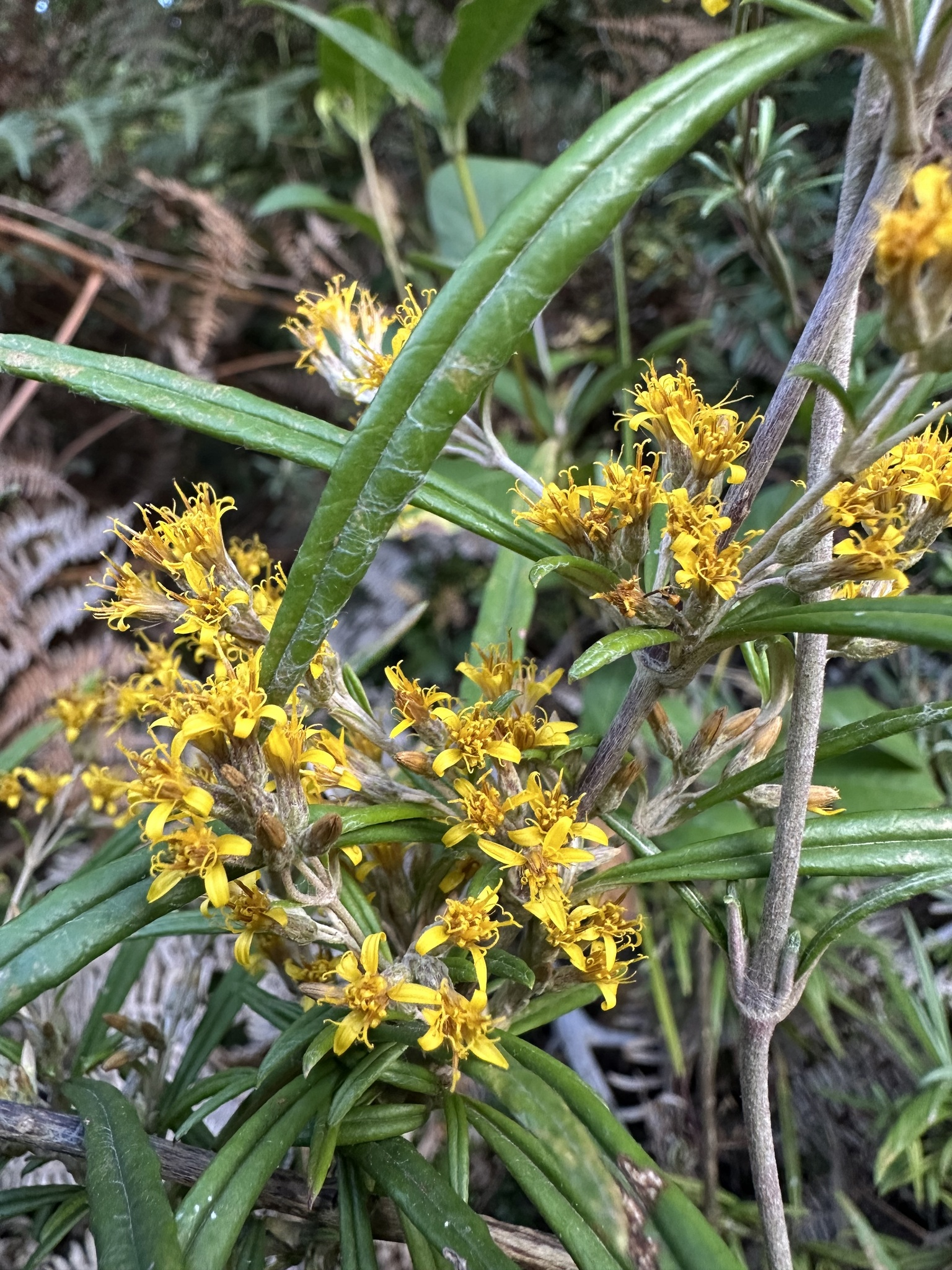
- Oligactis volubilis in Colombia

Scientific classification
- Kingdom: Plantae
- Clade: Embryophytes
- Clade: Tracheophytes
- Clade: Angiosperms
- Clade: Eudicots
- Clade: Asterids
- Order: Asterales
- Family: Asteraceae
- Subfamily: Vernonioideae
- Tribe: Liabeae
- Subtribe: Liabinae
- Genus: Oligactis; Cass.

= Oligactis =

Genus of flowering plants

Oligactis is a genus of South American flowering plants in the tribe Liabeae within the family Asteraceae.

Species

- Oligactis garcia-barrigae H.Rob.
- Oligactis latifolia (Hieron.) H.Rob. & Brettell
- Oligactis mikanioides (S.F.Blake) H.Rob. & Brettell
- Oligactis nubigena (Kunth) Cass.
- Oligactis sessiliflora (Kunth) H.Rob. & Brettell
- Oligactis volubilis (Kunth) Cass.

formerly included

- Oligactis coriacea (Hieron.) H.Rob. & Brettell – Sampera coriacea (Hieron.) V.A.Funk & H.Rob.
- Oligactis cuatrecasasii M.O.Dillon & Sagást. – Sampera cuatrecasasii (M.O.Dillon & Sagást.) V.A.Funk & H.Rob.
- Oligactis cusalaguensis (Hieron.) H.Rob. & Brettell – Sampera cusalaguensis (Hieron.) V.A.Funk & H.Rob.
- Oligactis ecuadoriensis (Hieron.) H.Rob. & Brettell – Sampera ecuadoriensis (Hieron.) V.A.Funk & H.Rob.
- Oligactis granatensis (Cuatrec.) H.Rob. & Brettell – Sampera coriacea (Hieron.) V.A.Funk & H.Rob.
- Oligactis ochracea (Cuatrec.) H.Rob. & Brettell – Sampera ochracea (Cuatrec.) V.A.Funk & H.Rob.
- Oligactis pastoensis (Cuatrec.) H.Rob. & Brettell – Sampera pastoensis (Cuatrec.) V.A.Funk & H.Rob.
- Oligactis pichinchensis (Hieron.) H.Rob. & Brettell – Sampera pichinchensis (Hieron.) V.A.Funk & H.Rob.
- Oligactis fruticosa (Muschl.) H.Rob. & Brettell – Ferreyranthus fruticosus (Muschl.) H.Rob.
