= Liabellum =

Scientific classification
- Kingdom: Plantae
- Clade: Embryophytes
- Clade: Tracheophytes
- Clade: Angiosperms
- Clade: Eudicots
- Clade: Asterids
- Order: Asterales
- Family: Asteraceae
- Subfamily: Vernonioideae
- Tribe: Liabeae
- Subtribe: Sinclairiinae
- Genus: Liabellum; Rydb. 1927 not Cabrera 1954 (syn of Microliabum)
- Species: L. hintoniorum

Binomial name
- Liabellum hintoniorum (B.L.Turner) H.Rob.

Synonyms
- Sinclairia sect. Liabellum (Rydb.) B.L.Turner; Sinclairia hintoniorum B.L.Turner; Liabum hintoniorum (B.L.Turner) H.Rob.

Genus of flowering plants

Liabellum is a genus of Mexican plants in the tribe Liabeae within the family Asteraceae.

Species

The only known species is Liabellum hintoniorum, native to the state of Mexico in central Mexico.

formerly included

see Microliabum Sinclairia

- Liabellum angustissimum - Sinclairia angustissima
- Liabellum cervinum - Sinclairia cervina
- Liabellum gentryi - Sinclairia gentryi
- Liabellum humile - Microliabum humile
- Liabellum palmeri - Sinclairia palmeri
