= Azorella atacamensis =

Scientific classification
- Kingdom: Plantae
- Clade: Embryophytes
- Clade: Tracheophytes
- Clade: Spermatophytes
- Clade: Angiosperms
- Clade: Eudicots
- Clade: Asterids
- Order: Apiales
- Family: Apiaceae
- Genus: Azorella
- Species: A. atacamensis

Binomial name
- Azorella atacamensis G.M.Plunkett & A.N.Nicolas

Species of flowering plant

Azorella atacamensis is a species of flowering plant in the genus Azorella found in Argentina and Chile.
