= Inkaliabum =

Scientific classification
- Kingdom: Plantae
- Clade: Embryophytes
- Clade: Tracheophytes
- Clade: Angiosperms
- Clade: Eudicots
- Clade: Asterids
- Order: Asterales
- Family: Asteraceae
- Subfamily: Vernonioideae
- Tribe: Liabeae
- Genus: Inkaliabum; D.G.Gut.
- Species: I. diehlii

Binomial name
- Inkaliabum diehlii (H.Rob.) D.G.Gut.

Synonyms
- Liabum diehlii H.Rob.

Genus of flowering plants

Inkaliabum is a genus of flowering plants in the genus Asteraceae. It includes a single species, Inkaliabum diehlii, which is endemic to Peru.
