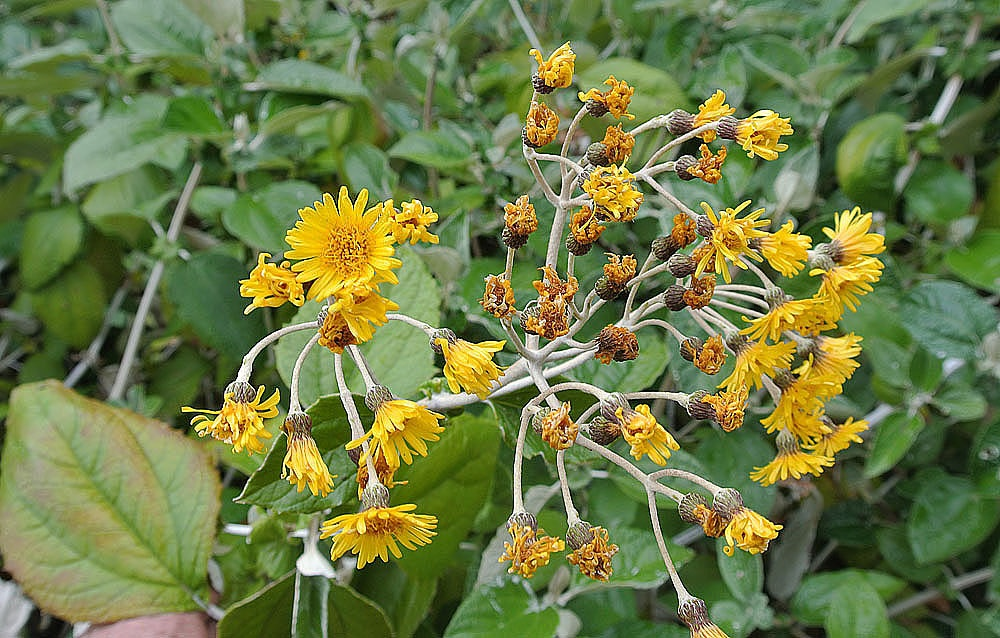
- Liabum igniarium

Scientific classification
- Kingdom: Plantae
- Clade: Embryophytes
- Clade: Tracheophytes
- Clade: Spermatophytes
- Clade: Angiosperms
- Clade: Eudicots
- Clade: Asterids
- Order: Asterales
- Family: Asteraceae
- Subfamily: Vernonioideae
- Tribe: Liabeae
- Subtribe: Liabinae
- Genus: Liabum; Adans.

Synonyms
- Allendea La Llave; Starkea Willd.; Viviania Willd. ex Less.; Andromachia Humb. & Bonpl.; Allendea La Llave & Lex.; Austroliabum H.Rob. & Brettell; Liabon Adans. alternative spelling

= Liabum =

Genus of flowering plants

Liabum is a genus of South American flowering plants in tribe Liabeae of the family Asteraceae.

Species accepted by the Plants of the World Online as of December 2022:

- Liabum acuminatum Rusby
- Liabum amplexicaule Poepp.
- Liabum asclepiadeum Sch.Bip.
- Liabum barahonense Urb.
- Liabum barclayae H.Rob.
- Liabum crispum Sch.Bip.
- Liabum cubense Sch.Bip.
- Liabum dillonii D.G.Gut. & Katinas
- Liabum eggersii Hieron.
- Liabum eriocaulon Poepp.
- Liabum falcatum Rusby
- Liabum ferreyrae H.Rob.
- Liabum floribundum Less.
- Liabum grandiflorum Less.
- Liabum igniarium Less.
- Liabum kingii H.Rob.
- Liabum macbridei H.Rob.
- Liabum melastomoides Less.
- Liabum nigropilosum Hieron.
- Liabum nudicaule H.Rob.
- Liabum oblanceolatum Urb. & Ekman
- Liabum ovatifolium Urb.
- Liabum poiteaui Urb.
- Liabum polycephalum Urb. & Ekman
- Liabum robinsonii D.G.Gut. & Katinas
- Liabum saloyense Domke
- Liabum sandemanii H.Rob.
- Liabum saundersii H.Rob.
- Liabum selleanum Urb.
- Liabum solidagineum Less.
- Liabum steinbachii H.Rob.
- Liabum stipulatum Rusby
- Liabum subacaule Rydb.
- Liabum trianae H.Rob.
- Liabum umbellatum (L.) Sch.Bip.
- Liabum vargasii H.Rob.
- Liabum wrightii Griseb.
