= Pseudonoseris =

Scientific classification
- Kingdom: Plantae
- Clade: Tracheophytes
- Clade: Angiosperms
- Clade: Eudicots
- Clade: Asterids
- Order: Asterales
- Family: Asteraceae
- Subfamily: Vernonioideae
- Tribe: Liabeae
- Subtribe: Paranepheliinae
- Genus: Pseudonoseris; H.Rob. & Brettell

Type species
- Liabum striatum Cuatrec.

Genus of plants

Pseudonoseris is a genus of South American plants in the tribe Liabeae of the family Asteraceae.

Species

- Pseudonoseris discolor (Muschl.) H.Rob. & Brettell - Peru, Bolivia
- Pseudonoseris glandulosa (Hieron.) Pruski - Peru
- Pseudonoseris striatum (Cuatrec.) H.Rob. & Brettell - Peru
- Pseudonoseris szyszylowiczii (Hieron.) H.Rob. & Brettell - Peru
