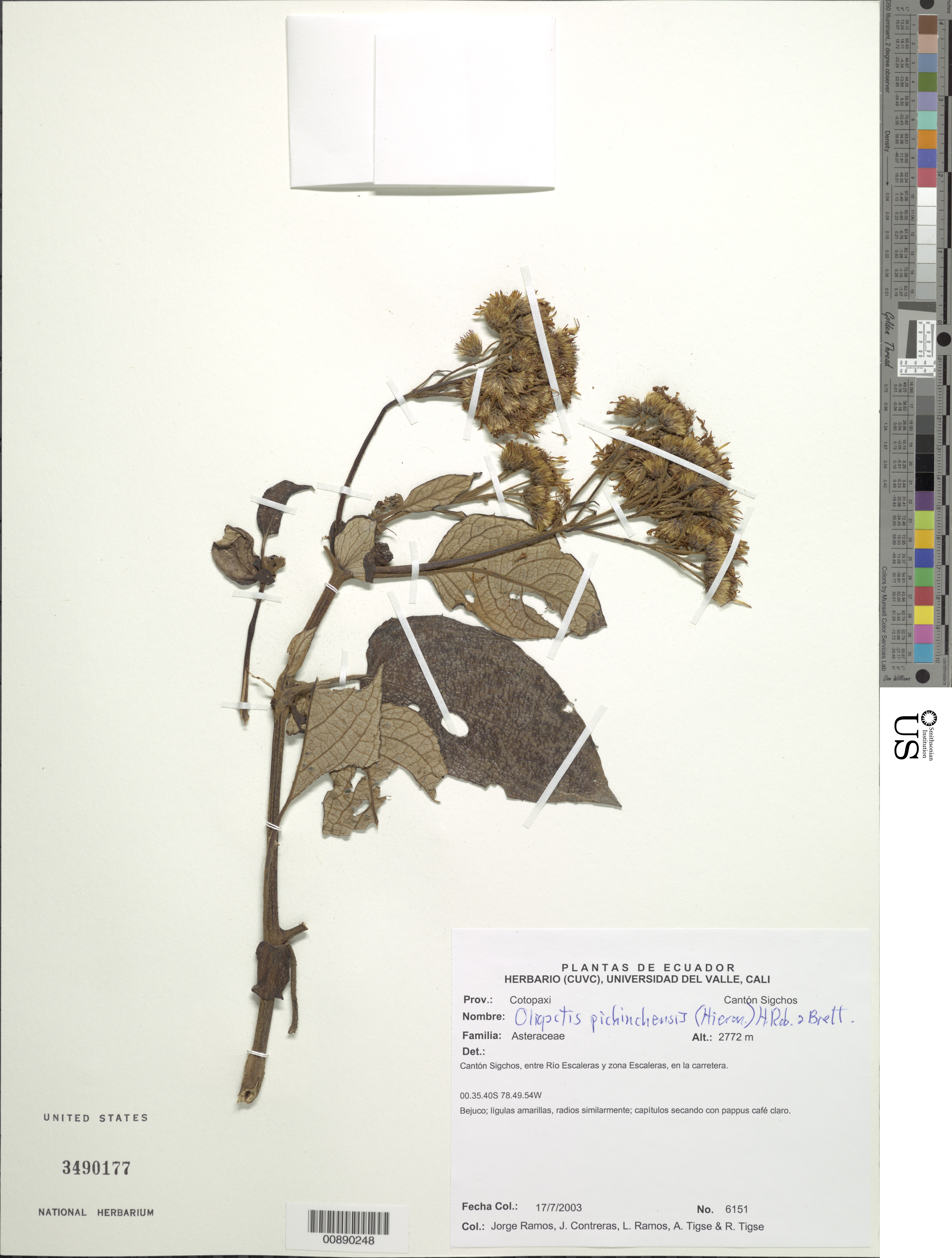

Scientific classification
- Kingdom: Plantae
- Clade: Embryophytes
- Clade: Tracheophytes
- Clade: Angiosperms
- Clade: Eudicots
- Clade: Asterids
- Order: Asterales
- Family: Asteraceae
- Subfamily: Vernonioideae
- Tribe: Liabeae
- Subtribe: Liabinae
- Genus: Sampera; V.A.Funk & H.Rob.

= Sampera =

Genus of plants

Sampera is a South American genus of flowering plants in the tribe Liabeae within the family Asteraceae.

Species

- Sampera asplundii (H.Rob.) V.A.Funk & H.Rob.
- Sampera coriacea (Hieron.) V.A.Funk & H.Rob.
- Sampera cuatrecasasii (M.O.Dillon & Sagást.) V.A.Funk & H.Rob.
- Sampera cusalaguensis (Hieron.) V.A.Funk & H.Rob.
- Sampera ecuadoriensis (Hieron.) V.A.Funk & H.Rob.
- Sampera ochracea (Cuatrec.) V.A.Funk & H.Rob.
- Sampera pastoensis (Cuatrec.) V.A.Funk & H.Rob.
- Sampera pichinchensis (Hieron.) V.A.Funk & H.Rob.
