= Azorella fuegiana =

Scientific classification
- Kingdom: Plantae
- Clade: Tracheophytes
- Clade: Angiosperms
- Clade: Eudicots
- Clade: Asterids
- Order: Apiales
- Family: Apiaceae
- Genus: Azorella
- Species: A. fuegiana

Binomial name
- Azorella fuegiana Speg.

Species of flowering plant

Azorella fuegiana is a species of flowering plant in the genus Azorella found in Chile.
