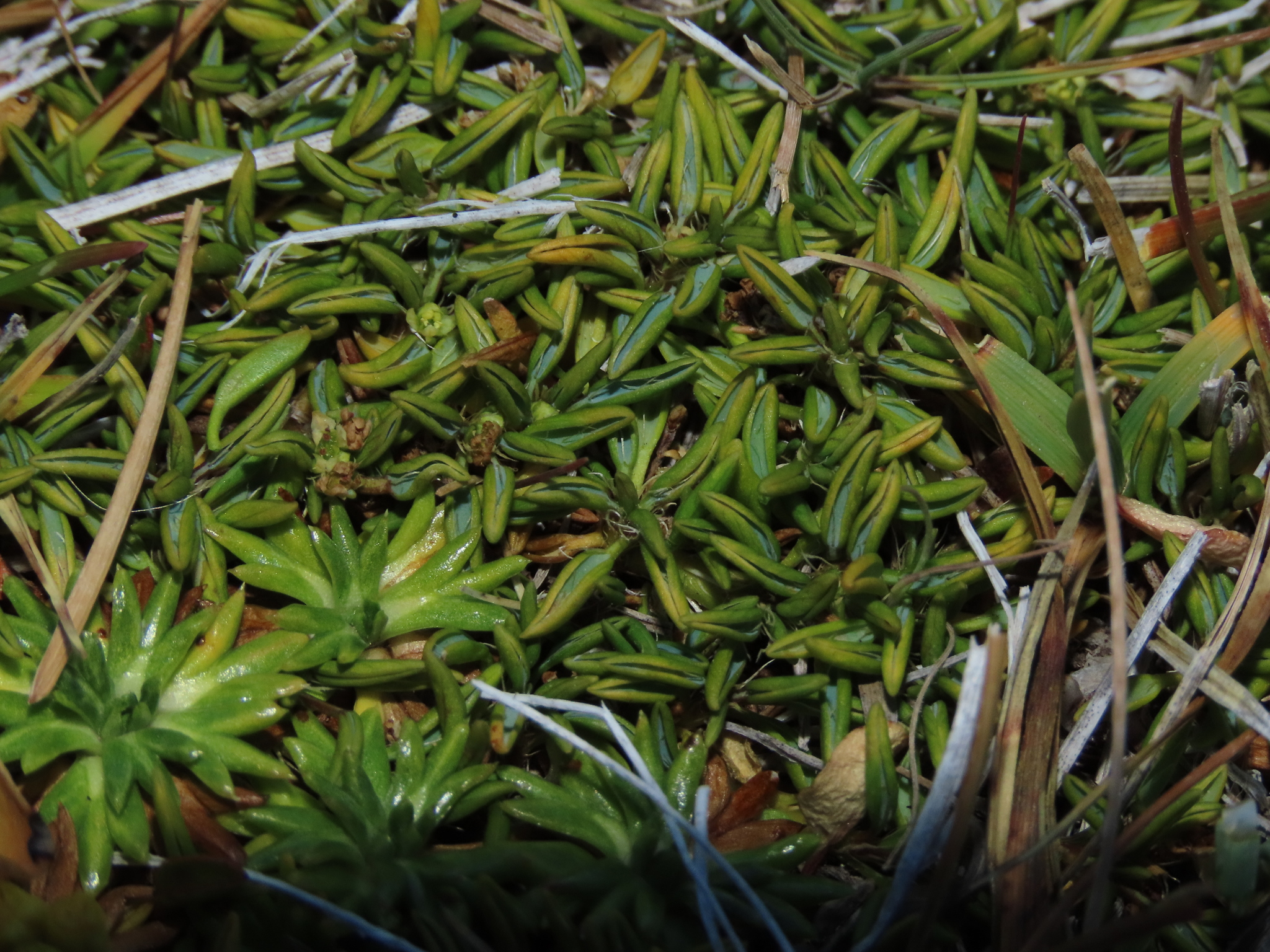

Scientific classification
- Kingdom: Plantae
- Clade: Tracheophytes
- Clade: Angiosperms
- Clade: Eudicots
- Clade: Asterids
- Order: Apiales
- Family: Apiaceae
- Genus: Azorella
- Species: A. filamentosa

Binomial name
- Azorella filamentosa Lam.

= Azorella filamentosa =

Species of flowering plant

Azorella filamentosa is a species of flowering plant in the genus Azorella existing in Chile and the Falkland Islands.
