= Bishopanthus =

Scientific classification
- Kingdom: Plantae
- Clade: Embryophytes
- Clade: Tracheophytes
- Clade: Angiosperms
- Clade: Eudicots
- Clade: Asterids
- Order: Asterales
- Family: Asteraceae
- Subfamily: Vernonioideae
- Tribe: Liabeae
- Genus: Bishopanthus; H.Rob.

Species
- Bishopanthus soliceps H.Rob.; Bishopanthus werffii Pruski & R.Ortiz

Genus of flowering plants

Bishopanthus is a genus of flowering plants in the family Asteraceae. It is endemic to Peru.

Species

- Bishopanthus soliceps H.Rob.
- Bishopanthus werffii Pruski & R.Ortiz
