= Chrysactinium =

Scientific classification
- Kingdom: Plantae
- Clade: Embryophytes
- Clade: Tracheophytes
- Clade: Spermatophytes
- Clade: Angiosperms
- Clade: Eudicots
- Clade: Asterids
- Order: Asterales
- Family: Asteraceae
- Subfamily: Vernonioideae
- Tribe: Liabeae
- Subtribe: Munnoziinae
- Genus: Chrysactinium (Kunth) Weddell

Type species
- Chrysactinium acaule (Kunth) Weddell

Synonyms
- Andromachia sect. Chrysactinium Kunth

Genus of flowering plants

Chrysactinium is a genus of South American flowering plants in the family Asteraceae.

Species

- Chrysactinium acaule (Kunth) Wedd. - Ecuador, Peru
- Chrysactinium amphothrix (S.F.Blake) H.Rob. & Brettell - Ecuador, Peru
- Chrysactinium breviscapum Sagást. & M.O.Dillon - Peru
- Chrysactinium caulescens (Hieron.) H.Rob. & Brettell- Ecuador, Peru
- Chrysactinium hieracioides (Kunth) H.Rob. & Brettell - Ecuador, Peru
- Chrysactinium rosulatum (Hieron.) H.Rob. & Brettell - Peru
- Chrysactinium wurdackii Zerm. & V.A.Funk - Peru
