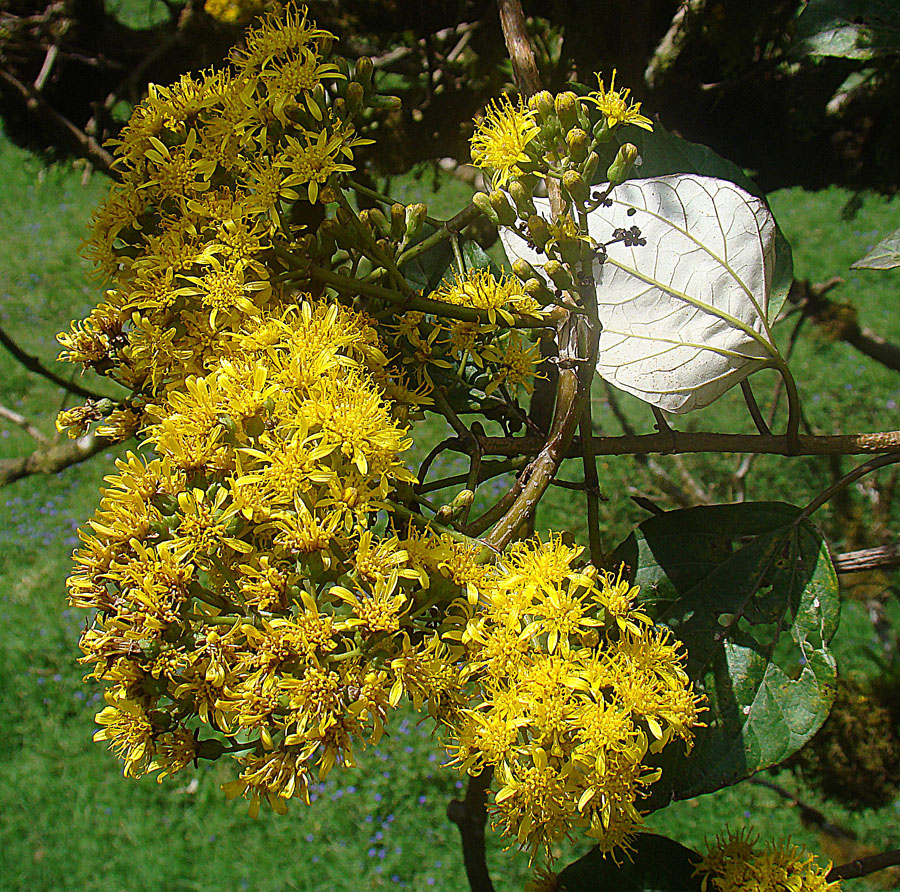
- Sinclairia polyantha

Scientific classification
- Kingdom: Plantae
- Clade: Tracheophytes
- Clade: Angiosperms
- Clade: Eudicots
- Clade: Asterids
- Order: Asterales
- Family: Asteraceae
- Subfamily: Vernonioideae
- Tribe: Liabeae
- Subtribe: Sinclairiinae
- Genus: Sinclairia; Hook. & Arn.

Type species
- Sinclairia discolor Hook. & Arn.

Synonyms
- Megaliabum Rydb.; Sinclairiopsis Rydb.

= Sinclairia =

Genus of plants

Sinclairia is a genus of Latin American plants in the tribe Liabeae within the family Asteraceae.

Species

- Sinclairia adenotricha (Greenm.) Rydb. - Oaxaca
- Sinclairia andrieuxii (DC.) H.Rob. & Brettell - Oaxaca, Chiapas, Guatemala
- Sinclairia andromachioides (Less.) Sch.Bip. ex Rydb. - Veracruz
- Sinclairia angustissima (A.Gray) B.L.Turner - Jalisco
- Sinclairia broomae H.Rob. - Guerrero
- Sinclairia caducifolia (B.L.Rob. & Bartlett) Rydb. - Guerrero
- Sinclairia cervina (B.L.Rob.) B.L.Turner - Jalisco
- Sinclairia deamii (B.L.Rob. & Bartlett) Rydb. - Tabasco, Chiapas, Yucatán Peninsula, Central America
- Sinclairia deppeana (Less.) Rydb. - Oaxaca
- Sinclairia dimidia (S.F.Blake) H.Rob. & Brettell - Chiapas, Guatemala
- Sinclairia discolor Hook. & Arn. - from Panama to Jalisco
- Sinclairia gentryi (H.Rob.) B.L.Turner - Nayarit
- Sinclairia glabra (Hemsl.) Rydb. - from Oaxaca to Nicaragua
- Sinclairia hintoniorum B.L.Turner - State of Mexico
- Sinclairia hypochlora (S.F.Blake) Rydb. - Chiapas, Guatemala
- Sinclairia ismaelis Panero & Villaseñor - Oaxaca
- Sinclairia klattii (B.L.Rob. & Greenm.) H.Rob. & Brettell - Oaxaca, Guerrero, Veracruz
- Sinclairia liebmannii (Klatt) Sch.Bip. ex Rydb. - Oaxaca
- Sinclairia manriquei Panero & Villaseñor - Oaxaca
- Sinclairia moorei (H.Rob. & Brettell) H.Rob. & Brettell - Oaxaca
- Sinclairia palmeri (A.Gray) B.L.Turner - Durango
- Sinclairia platylepis (Sch.Bip. ex Sch.Bip.) Rydb.
- Sinclairia polyantha (Klatt) Rydb. - from Oaxaca to Colombia
- Sinclairia pringlei (B.L.Rob. & Greenm.) H.Rob. & Brettell - Jalisco, Nayarit
- Sinclairia sericolepis (Hemsl.) Rydb. - Chiapas, Oaxaca, Tabasco, Veracruz
- Sinclairia similis (McVaugh) H.Rob. & Brettell - Jalisco
- Sinclairia sublobata (B.L.Rob.) Rydb. - from Oaxaca to Nicaragua
- Sinclairia tajumulcensis (Standl. & Steyerm.) H.Rob. & Brettell - Guatemala
- Sinclairia vagans (S.F.Blake) H.Rob. & Brettell - Chiapas, Guatemala
