= Dillandia =

Scientific classification
- Kingdom: Plantae
- Clade: Tracheophytes
- Clade: Angiosperms
- Clade: Eudicots
- Clade: Asterids
- Order: Asterales
- Family: Asteraceae
- Subfamily: Vernonioideae
- Tribe: Liabeae
- Subtribe: Liabinae
- Genus: Dillandia; V.A.Funk & H.Rob.

Genus of flowering plants

Dillandia is a genus of flowering plants in the family Asteraceae.

Species:

- Dillandia chachapoyensis (H.Rob.) V.A.Funk & H.Rob. - Peru
- Dillandia subumbellata V.A.Funk & H.Rob. - Peru, Ecuador
