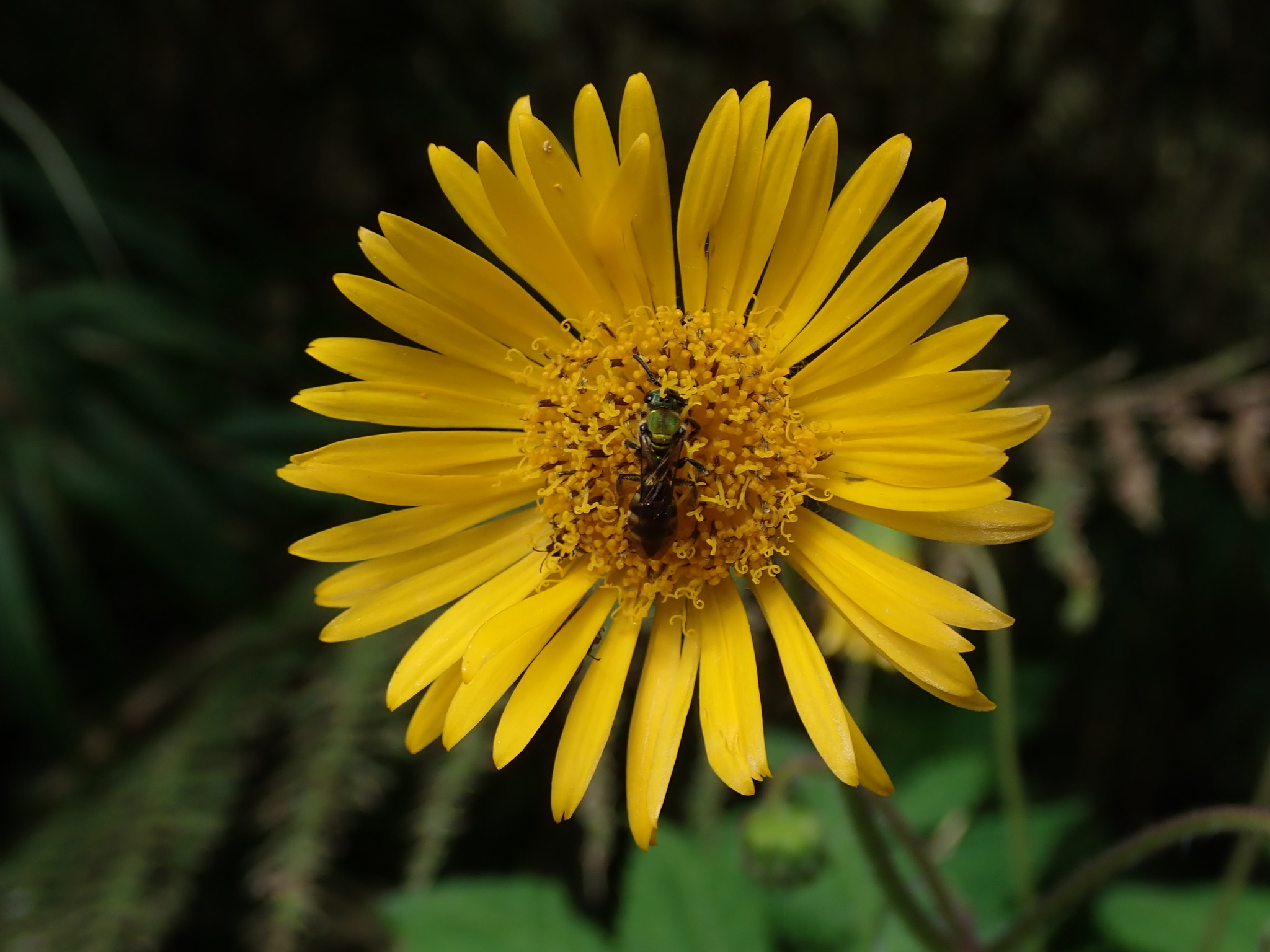

Conservation status
- Near Threatened (IUCN 3.1)

Scientific classification
- Kingdom: Plantae
- Clade: Tracheophytes
- Clade: Angiosperms
- Clade: Eudicots
- Clade: Asterids
- Order: Asterales
- Family: Asteraceae
- Genus: Munnozia
- Species: M. pinnatipartita

Binomial name
- Munnozia pinnatipartita (Hieron.) H.Rob. & Brettell

= Munnozia pinnatipartita =

Species of flowering plant

Munnozia pinnatipartita is a species of flowering plant in the family Asteraceae. It is found only in Ecuador. Its natural habitats are subtropical or tropical moist lowland forests and subtropical or tropical moist montane forests. It is threatened by habitat loss.
