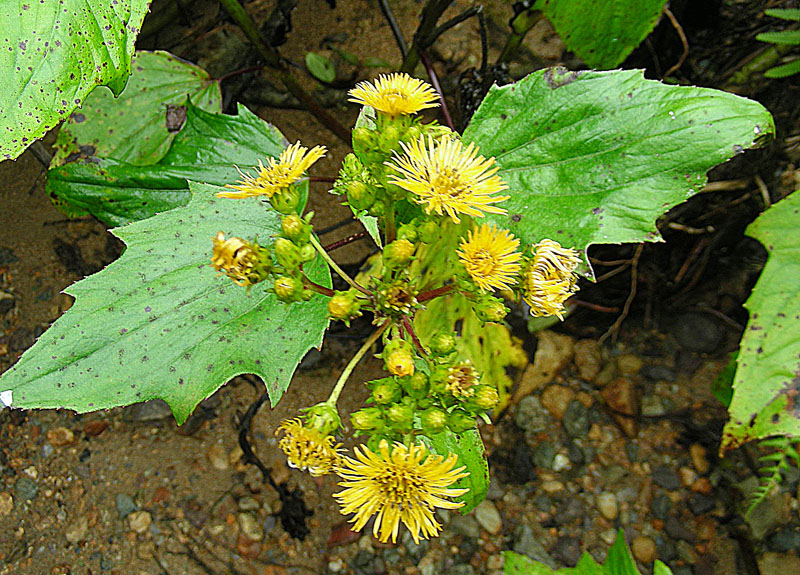
- Erato polymnioides

Scientific classification
- Kingdom: Plantae
- Clade: Embryophytes
- Clade: Tracheophytes
- Clade: Angiosperms
- Clade: Eudicots
- Clade: Asterids
- Order: Asterales
- Family: Asteraceae
- Subfamily: Vernonioideae
- Tribe: Liabeae
- Subtribe: Paranepheliinae
- Genus: Erato; DC.

Synonyms
- Munnozia subgen. Erato (DC.) H. Rob. & Brettell

= Erato (plant) =

Genus of flowering plants

Erato is a genus of flowering plants belonging to tribe Liabeae of the family Asteraceae. It is found from Costa Rica to Bolivia, with its main centre of diversity in Ecuador.

Species

- Erato costaricensis E. Moran & V.A.Funk - Costa Rica
- Erato polymnioides DC. - Panamá, Ecuador, Peru, Bolivia
- Erato sodiroi (Hieron.) H.Rob. - Ecuador
- Erato stenolepis (S.F.Blake) H.Rob. - Peru
- Erato vulcanica (Klatt) H.Rob. - Costa Rica, Venezuela, Colombia, Ecuador
