= Munnozia canarensis =

Conservation status
- Endangered (IUCN 3.1)

Scientific classification
- Kingdom: Plantae
- Clade: Tracheophytes
- Clade: Angiosperms
- Clade: Eudicots
- Clade: Asterids
- Order: Asterales
- Family: Asteraceae
- Genus: Munnozia
- Species: M. canarensis

Binomial name
- Munnozia canarensis (Cuatrec.) H.Rob. & Brettell

Synonyms
- Liabum canarense Cuatrec.

Species of flowering plant

Munnozia canarensis is a species of flowering plant in the family Asteraceae. It is found only in Ecuador. Its natural habitat is subtropical or tropical moist montane forests. It is threatened by habitat loss.
