= Azorella aretioides =

Scientific classification
- Kingdom: Plantae
- Clade: Tracheophytes
- Clade: Angiosperms
- Clade: Eudicots
- Clade: Asterids
- Order: Apiales
- Family: Apiaceae
- Genus: Azorella
- Species: A. aretioides

Binomial name
- Azorella aretioides (Kunth) Willd. ex DC.

Species of flowering plant

Azorella aretioides is a species of flowering plant in the genus Azorella found in Colombia and Ecuador. Azorella aretioides var. elongata is a variety of the species, also found in Colombia and Ecuador.
