= Ferreyranthus =

Scientific classification
- Kingdom: Plantae
- Clade: Embryophytes
- Clade: Tracheophytes
- Clade: Spermatophytes
- Clade: Angiosperms
- Clade: Eudicots
- Clade: Asterids
- Order: Asterales
- Family: Asteraceae
- Subfamily: Vernonioideae
- Tribe: Liabeae
- Subtribe: Liabinae
- Genus: Ferreyranthus; H.Rob. & Brettell

Type species
- Ferreyranthus verbascifolius (Kunth) H.Rob. & Brettell

Synonyms
- Ferreyanthus (Kunth) H.Rob. & Brettell, spelling variant

Genus of flowering plants

Ferreyranthus is a genus of South American flowering plants in the family Asteraceae.

Species

- Ferreyranthus excelsus H.Rob. & Brettell
- Ferreyranthus fruticosus (Muschl.) H.Rob.
- Ferreyranthus gentryi H.Rob.
- Ferreyranthus ramonii H.Rob.
- Ferreyranthus rugosus (Ferreyra) H.Rob. & Brettell
- Ferreyranthus vaginans (Muschl.) H.Rob. & Brettell
- Ferreyranthus verbascifolius (Kunth) H.Rob. & Brettell
- Ferreyranthus vernonioides (Muschl.) H.Rob. & Brettell
