= Azorella albovaginata =

Scientific classification
- Kingdom: Plantae
- Clade: Tracheophytes
- Clade: Angiosperms
- Clade: Eudicots
- Clade: Asterids
- Order: Apiales
- Family: Apiaceae
- Genus: Azorella
- Species: A. albovaginata

Binomial name
- Azorella albovaginata Plunkett & Nicolas

Species of flowering plant

Azorella albovaginata is a species of flowering plant in the genus Azorella found in northwest and south Argentina. Azorella albovaginata var. pauciflorum is a variety of the species and is found in central Chile
