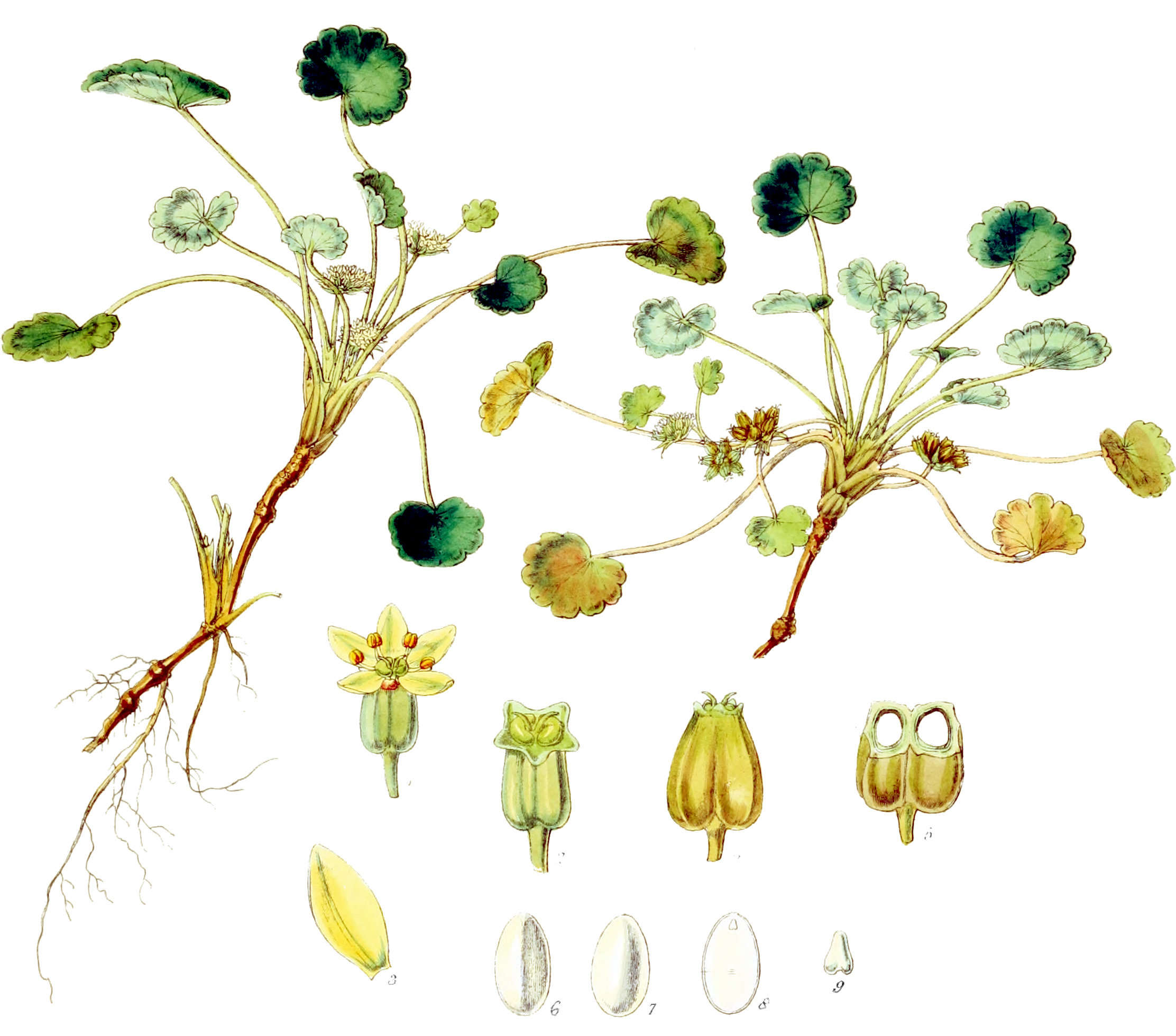
- A. schizeilema as Pozoa reniformis (Plate XI - Walter Fitch)

Conservation status
- Naturally Uncommon (NZ TCS)

Scientific classification
- Kingdom: Plantae
- Clade: Tracheophytes
- Clade: Angiosperms
- Clade: Eudicots
- Clade: Asterids
- Order: Apiales
- Family: Apiaceae
- Genus: Azorella
- Species: A. schizeilema

Binomial name
- Azorella schizeilema G.M.Plunkett & A.N.Nicolas

Synonyms
- Pozoa reniformis Hook.f. Schizeilema reniforme (Hook.f.) Domin

= Azorella schizeilema =

Species of flowering plant

Azorella schizeilema is a species of cushion plant in the Apiaceae family, native to the Auckland and Campbell Islands.

If flowers from November to February, and fruits from November to March.

== Taxonomy ==
Azorella schizeilema was described as Pozoa reniformis by Joseph Dalton Hooker in 1844, and illustrated in the accompanying 1852 volume by Walter Hood Fitch. Then, in 1908, Karel Domin reassigned it to the genus, Schizeilema. In 2017, G.M.Plunkett & A.N.Nicolas assigned it to the genus, Azorella, in an attempt to create a monophyletic genus.

== Conservation status ==
In 2009 and 2012, it was declared "At Risk - Naturally Uncommon" under the New Zealand Threat Classification System. In 2018 its status remained as "At Risk - Naturally Uncommon" due to its restricted range.
