= Chionopappus =

Scientific classification
- Kingdom: Plantae
- Clade: Tracheophytes
- Clade: Angiosperms
- Clade: Eudicots
- Clade: Asterids
- Order: Asterales
- Family: Asteraceae
- Tribe: Liabeae
- Subtribe: Paranepheliinae
- Genus: Chionopappus; Benth.
- Species: C. benthamii

Binomial name
- Chionopappus benthamii S.F.Blake

Species of plant

Chionopappus is a monotypic genus of flowering plants in the family Asteraceae, containing the single species Chionopappus benthamii. It is endemic to Peru, where it occurs at elevations up to 2500 meters in the central part of the country. It is also sometimes found in the lomas of northern Peru, a type of moist oasis formed by fog that accumulates along the hills in the coastal desert region.

This plant is distinguished from other members of the tribe Liabeae by its reddish disc florets and its plumelike pappus of bristles.
