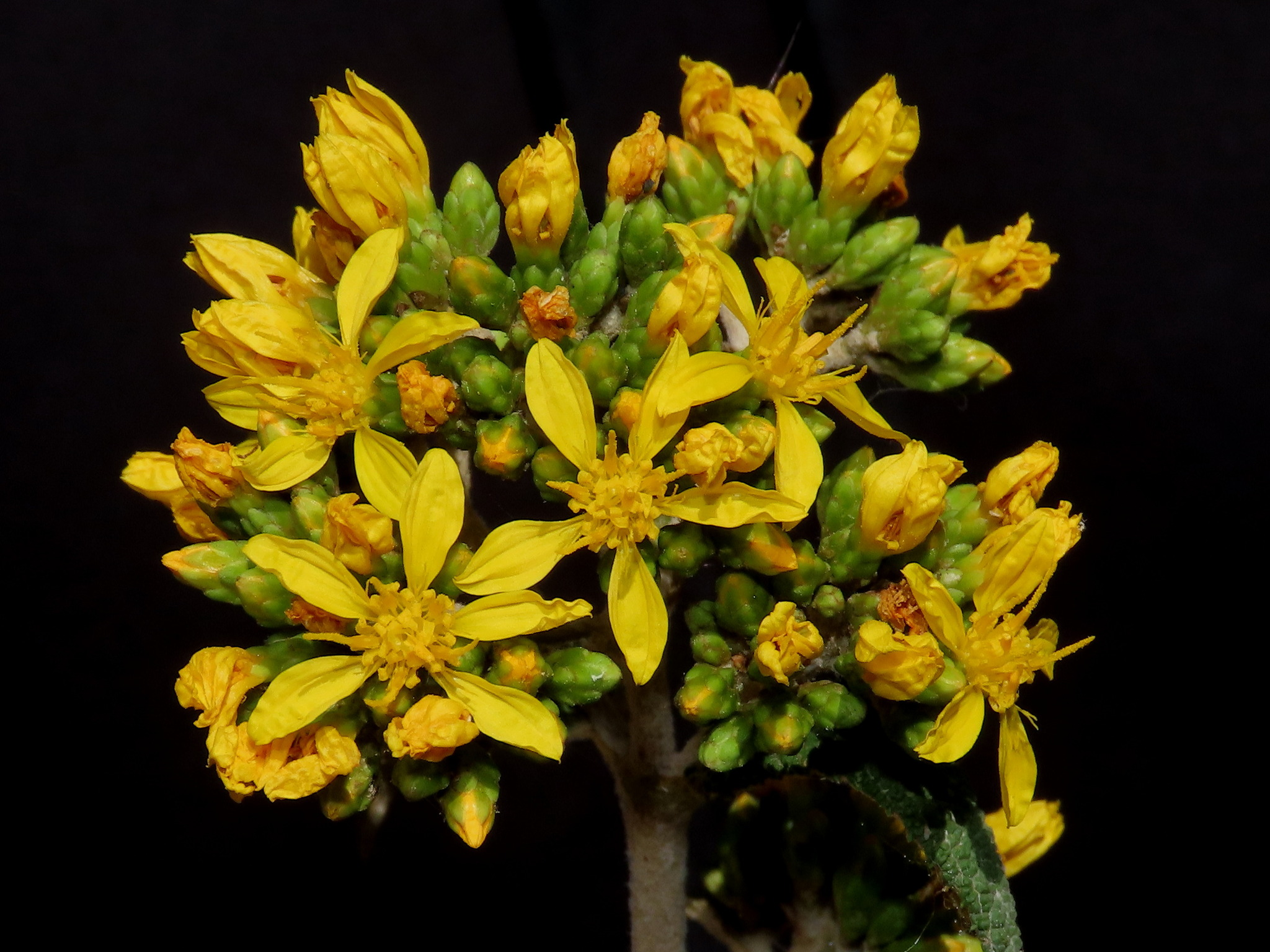
- Cacosmia rugosa

Scientific classification
- Kingdom: Plantae
- Clade: Embryophytes
- Clade: Tracheophytes
- Clade: Spermatophytes
- Clade: Angiosperms
- Clade: Eudicots
- Clade: Asterids
- Order: Asterales
- Family: Asteraceae
- Subfamily: Vernonioideae
- Tribe: Liabeae
- Genus: Cacosmia; Kunth

Synonyms
- Clairvillea DC.

= Cacosmia (plant) =

Genus of flowering plants

Cacosmia is a genus of flowering plants in the family Asteraceae. The genus is native to South America.

The genus name is derived from the Greek kakos ("bad, ugly") and -osma ("smell, stink, fragrant odour, scent, perfume").

Species

- Cacosmia harlingii B.Nord. - Loja Province of Ecuador
- Cacosmia hieronymi H.Rob. - Ecuador (Loja Province, Azuay, Cañar)
- Cacosmia rugosa Kunth - Peru, Ecuador (Chimborazo, Imbabura, Loja Province, Azuay, Cañar)
