= Azorella ameghinoi =

Scientific classification
- Kingdom: Plantae
- Clade: Tracheophytes
- Clade: Angiosperms
- Clade: Eudicots
- Clade: Asterids
- Order: Apiales
- Family: Apiaceae
- Genus: Azorella
- Species: A. ameghinoi

Binomial name
- Azorella ameghinoi Speg.

Species of flowering plant

Azorella ameghinoi is a species of flowering plant in the genus Azorella found in and southern Argentina and Chile.
