= Azorella monteroi =

Scientific classification
- Kingdom: Plantae
- Clade: Tracheophytes
- Clade: Angiosperms
- Clade: Eudicots
- Clade: Asterids
- Order: Apiales
- Family: Apiaceae
- Genus: Azorella
- Species: A. monteroi

Binomial name
- Azorella monteroi S.Martínez & Constance

Species of plant

Azorella monteroi is a species of flowering plant in the family Apiaceae. It is endemic to southern Chile in the Biobío and Araucanía regions.

== Description ==
Azorella monteroi is a monoecious plant that grows forming up to 10 cm tall flat cushions. The flowers are arranged in umbels and have white petals.
