= Erato sodiroi =

Conservation status
- Vulnerable (IUCN 3.1)

Scientific classification
- Kingdom: Plantae
- Clade: Tracheophytes
- Clade: Angiosperms
- Clade: Eudicots
- Clade: Asterids
- Order: Asterales
- Family: Asteraceae
- Genus: Erato
- Species: E. sodiroi

Binomial name
- Erato sodiroi (Hieron.) H. Rob.

Synonyms
- Liabum sodiroi Hieron. in Bot. Jahrb. Syst. 29: 61 (1900); Munnozia sodiroi (Hieron.) H.Rob. & Brettell in Phytologia 28: 57 (1974)

Species of flowering plant

Erato sodiroi is a species of flowering plant in the family Asteraceae. It is found only in Ecuador. Its natural habitat is subtropical or tropical moist montane forests. It is threatened by habitat loss.

The specific epithet of sodiroi refers to Luis Sodiro (1836–1909), who was an Italian Jesuit priest and a field botanist who collected many plants in Ecuador.

It was first published in Phytologia 34: 379 in 1976.
