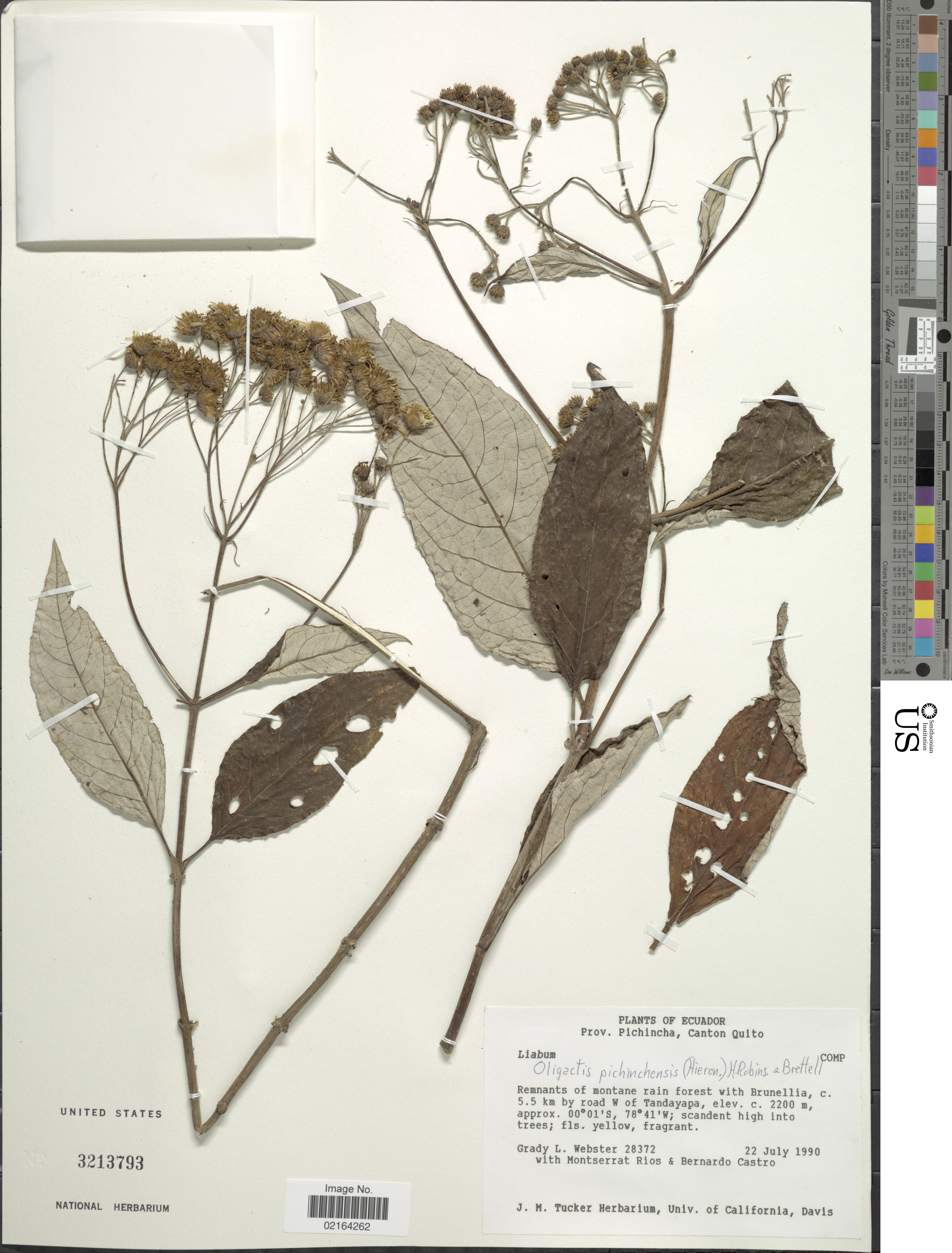

Conservation status
- Vulnerable (IUCN 3.1)

Scientific classification
- Kingdom: Plantae
- Clade: Tracheophytes
- Clade: Angiosperms
- Clade: Eudicots
- Clade: Asterids
- Order: Asterales
- Family: Asteraceae
- Genus: Sampera
- Species: S. asplundii

Binomial name
- Sampera asplundii H.Rob. V.A.Funk & H.Rob.

Synonyms
- Oligactis asplundii H.Rob.

= Sampera asplundii =

Species of flowering plant

Sampera asplundii is a species of flowering plant in the family Asteraceae. It is found only in Ecuador and it is threatened by habitat loss. Its natural habitat is subtropical or tropical moist montane forests.
