= Philoglossa =

Scientific classification
- Kingdom: Plantae
- Clade: Tracheophytes
- Clade: Angiosperms
- Clade: Eudicots
- Clade: Asterids
- Order: Asterales
- Family: Asteraceae
- Subfamily: Vernonioideae
- Tribe: Liabeae
- Subtribe: Paranepheliinae
- Genus: Philoglossa; DC.

Type species
- Philoglossa peruviana DC.

Genus of flowering plants

Philoglossa is a genus of South American plants in the tribe Liabeae within the family Asteraceae.

Species

- Philoglossa mimuloides (Hieron.) H.Rob. & Cuatrec. - Ecuador, Peru, Bolivia
- Philoglossa peruviana DC. - Peru
