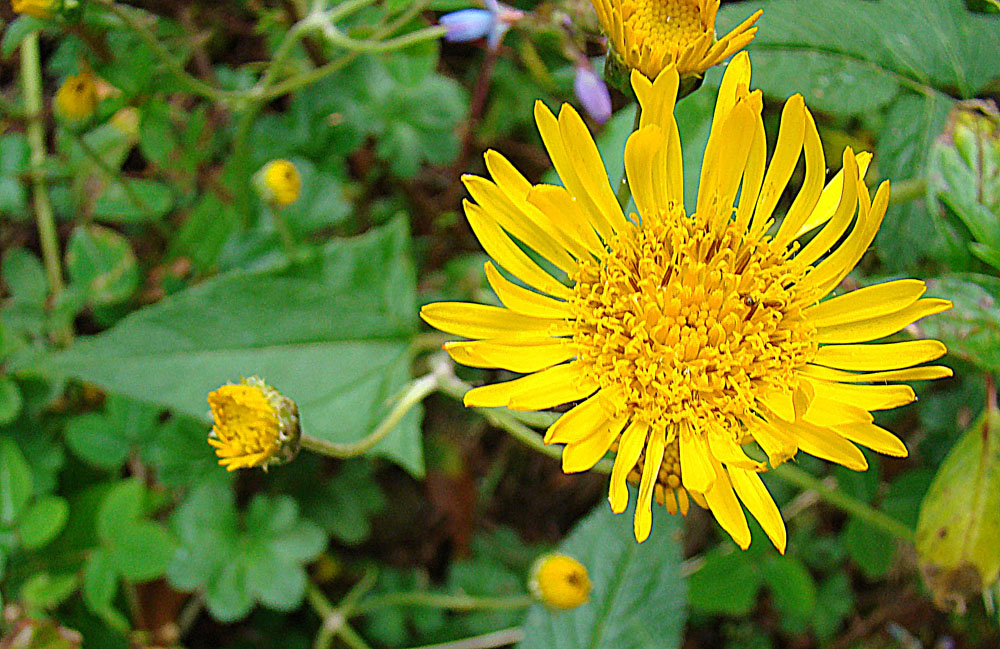
- Munnozia senecionidis

Scientific classification
- Kingdom: Plantae
- Clade: Embryophytes
- Clade: Tracheophytes
- Clade: Angiosperms
- Clade: Eudicots
- Clade: Asterids
- Order: Asterales
- Family: Asteraceae
- Subfamily: Vernonioideae
- Tribe: Liabeae
- Subtribe: Munnoziinae
- Genus: Munnozia; Ruiz & Pav.

Synonyms
- Chrysastrum Willd. ex Wedd.; Kastnera Sch.Bip.; Prionolepis Poepp.; Munnozia subg. Kastnera (Sch.Bip.) H.Rob. & Brettell; Alibum Less.; Liabum subg. Chrysastrum Willd. ex Sch.Bip.

= Munnozia =

Genus of flowering plants

Munnozia is a genus of flowering plants in the family Asteraceae. It is centered in the Andes.

Species accepted by the Plants of the World Online as of December 2022:

- Munnozia acostae (I.C.Chung) H.Rob. & Brettell
- Munnozia affinis (S.F.Blake) H.Rob. & Brettell
- Munnozia annua (Muschl.) H.Rob. & Brettell
- Munnozia asplundii H.Rob.
- Munnozia campii H.Rob.
- Munnozia canarensis (Cuatrec.) H.Rob. & Brettell
- Munnozia cardenasii (Cabrera) H.Rob. & Brettell
- Munnozia chimboracensis H.Rob.
- Munnozia convencionensis (Cuatrec.) H.Rob. & Brettell
- Munnozia ferreyrae H.Rob.
- Munnozia foliosa Rusby
- Munnozia fosbergii H.Rob.
- Munnozia fournetii H.Rob.
- Munnozia gigantea Rusby
- Munnozia glandulosa Rusby
- Munnozia harlingii H.Rob.
- Munnozia hastifolia (Poepp.) H.Rob. & Brettell
- Munnozia hirta Rusby
- Munnozia jussieui (Cass.) H.Rob. & Brettell
- Munnozia karstenii H.Rob.
- Munnozia lanceolata Ruiz & Pav.
- Munnozia liaboides (Less.) H.Rob.
- Munnozia longifolia Rusby
- Munnozia luyensis H.Rob.
- Munnozia lyrata (A.Gray) H.Rob. & Brettell
- Munnozia maronii (André) H.Rob.
- Munnozia nivea (Hieron.) H.Rob. & Brettell
- Munnozia olearioides (Muschl.) H.Rob. & Brettell
- Munnozia onoserifolia (S.Díaz & Rodr.-Cabeza) D.G.Gut. & Katinas
- Munnozia ortiziae Pruski
- Munnozia oxyphylla (Cuatrec.) H.Rob. & Brettell
- Munnozia peruensis (Cuatrec.) H.Rob. & Brettell
- Munnozia pinnatipartita (Hieron.) H.Rob. & Brettell
- Munnozia pinnulosa (Kuntze) H.Rob. & Brettell
- Munnozia rusbyi Britton ex Rusby
- Munnozia sagasteguii H.Rob.
- Munnozia senecionidis Benth.
- Munnozia silphioides (Poepp.) H.Rob. & Brettell
- Munnozia smithii H.Rob.
- Munnozia subviridis (S.F.Blake) H.Rob. & Brettell
- Munnozia tenera (Sch.Bip.) H.Rob. & Brettell
- Munnozia trinervis Ruiz & Pav.
- Munnozia venosissima Ruiz & Pav.
- Munnozia wilburii H.Rob.
