= Sampera cusalaguensis =

Conservation status
- Data Deficient (IUCN 3.1)

Scientific classification
- Kingdom: Plantae
- Clade: Embryophytes
- Clade: Tracheophytes
- Clade: Angiosperms
- Clade: Eudicots
- Clade: Asterids
- Order: Asterales
- Family: Asteraceae
- Genus: Sampera
- Species: S. cusalaguensis

Binomial name
- Sampera cusalaguensis (Hieron.) V.A.Funk & H.Rob.

Synonyms
- Liabum cusalaguense Hieron.; Oligactis cusalaguensis (Hieron.) H.Rob. & Brettell

Species of flowering plant

Sampera cusalaguensis, synonym Oligactis cusalaguensis, is a species of flowering plant in the family Asteraceae. It is found only in Ecuador. Its natural habitat is subtropical or tropical moist montane forests. It is threatened by habitat loss.
