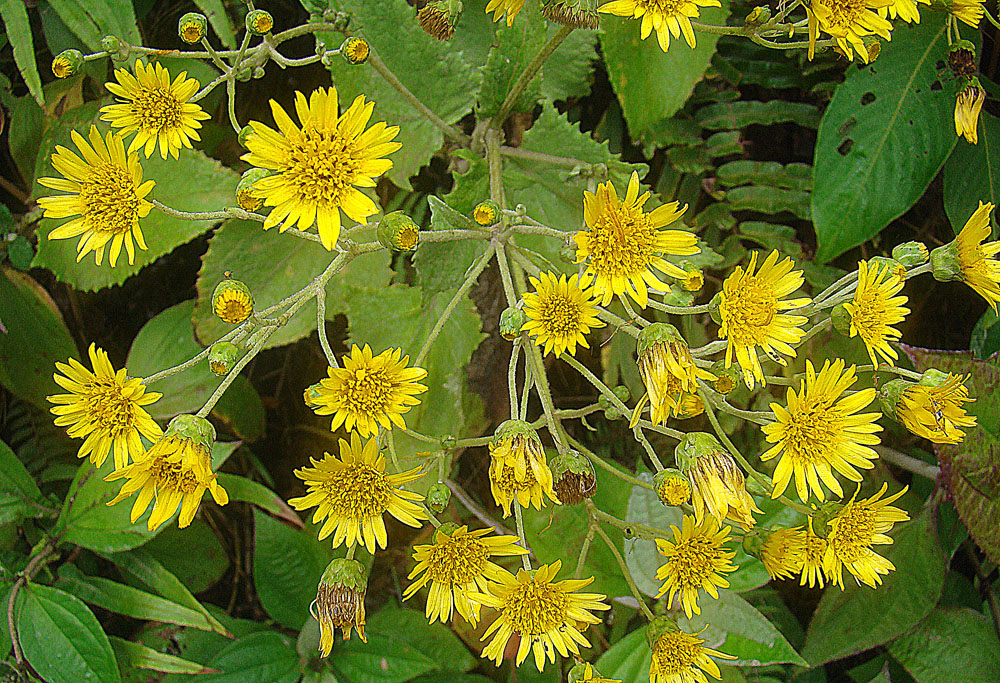
- Munnozia wilburii

Scientific classification
- Kingdom: Plantae
- Clade: Tracheophytes
- Clade: Angiosperms
- Clade: Eudicots
- Clade: Asterids
- Order: Asterales
- Family: Asteraceae
- Subfamily: Vernonioideae
- Tribe: Liabeae; Rydb.

Subtribes
- Liabinae; Munnoziinae; Paranepheliinae; Sinclairiinae

= Liabeae =

Tribe of flowering plants

Liabeae is a tribe in the plant family Asteraceae. It is endemic to the Neotropics, where it is most diverse in the northern and central Andes. The center of diversity is in Peru.

This tribe includes annual and perennial herbs, shrubs, lianas, and small trees. In general, plants of the tribe have oppositely arranged leaves and almost all have yellow ray and disc florets, while a few have red or white florets. Most contain a white latex. The fruit usually has a pappus with an outer layer of scales and an inner layer of bristles.

Most species occur in forests. Some can be found in desert, alpine, and disturbed habitat types.

There are 18 genera with a total of about 165 species.

Genera

- Bishopanthus
- Cacosmia
- Chionopappus
- Chrysactinium
- Dillandia
- Erato
- Ferreyranthus
- Liabellum
- Liabum
- Microliabum
- Munnozia
- Oligactis
- Paranephelius
- Philoglossa
- Pseudonoseris
- Sampera
- Sinclairia
- Sinclairiopsis
