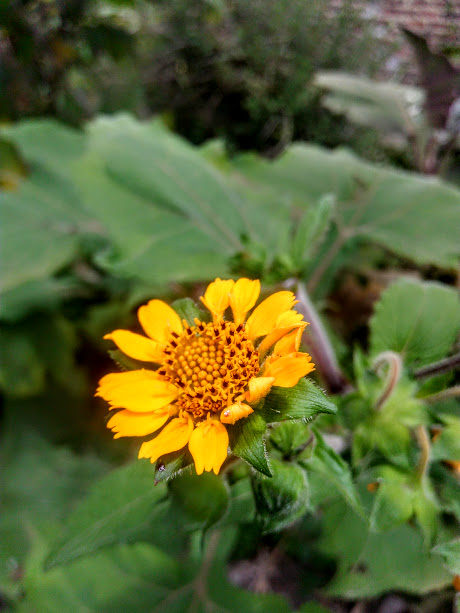
- Microliabum mulgediifolium

Scientific classification
- Kingdom: Plantae
- Clade: Embryophytes
- Clade: Tracheophytes
- Clade: Spermatophytes
- Clade: Angiosperms
- Clade: Eudicots
- Clade: Asterids
- Order: Asterales
- Family: Asteraceae
- Subfamily: Vernonioideae
- Tribe: Liabeae
- Subtribe: Paranepheliinae
- Genus: Microliabum; Cabrera

Type species
- Microliabum humile (Cabrera) Cabrera

Synonyms
- Angelianthus H.Rob. & Brettell; Microliabum subg. Austroliabum (H.Rob. & Brettell) H.Rob.; Liabellum Cabrera 1954, illegitimate homonym not Rydb. 1927

= Microliabum =

Genus of flowering plants

Microliabum is a genus of South American flowering plants in the family Asteraceae.

Accepted species

- Microliabum candidum (Griseb.) H.Rob. - Argentina (Tucumán, San Luis, La Rioja, Catamarca)
- Microliabum eremophilum (Cabrera) H.Rob. - Argentina (Tucumán, Salta)
- Microliabum humile (Cabrera) Cabrera - Argentina (Jujuy, Salta)
- Microliabum mulgediifolium (Muschl.) H.Rob. - Bolivia
- Microliabum polymnioides (R.E.Fr.) H.Rob. - Bolivia, Argentina (Jujuy, Salta, Catamarca, Tucumán)
