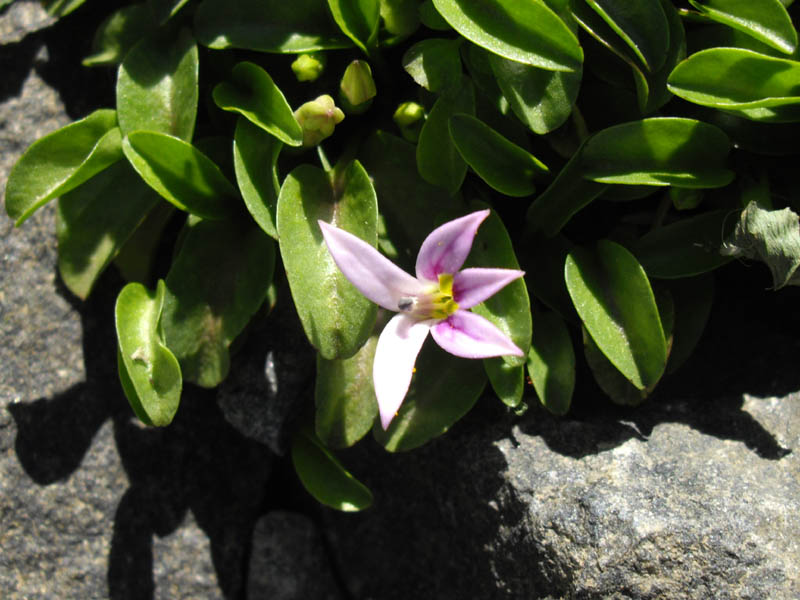

Scientific classification
- Kingdom: Plantae
- Clade: Embryophytes
- Clade: Tracheophytes
- Clade: Spermatophytes
- Clade: Angiosperms
- Clade: Eudicots
- Clade: Asterids
- Order: Asterales
- Family: Campanulaceae
- Genus: Lobelia
- Species: L. oligophylla

Binomial name
- Lobelia oligophylla (Wedd.) Lammers

Synonyms
- Hypsela atacamensis (Phil.) Benth. & Hook. f.; Hypsela atacamensis (Phil.) Phil.f.; Hypsela longiflora (Hook. f.) Benth. & Hook. f.; Hypsela longiflora (Hook.f.) F.Phil.; Hypsela oligophylla (Wedd.) Benth. & Hook.f. ex Zahlbr.; Hypsela reniformis (Kunth) C.Presl; Hypsela subsessilis (Wedd.) Benth. & Hook. f.; Hypsela subsessilis (Wedd.) Benth. & Hook.f. ex Zahlbr.; Lysipomia reniformis Kunth; Pratia atacamensis Phil.; Pratia longiflora Hook.f.; Pratia oligophylla Wedd.; Pratia pencana Phil.; Pratia subsessilis Wedd.

= Lobelia oligophylla =

Species of flowering plant

Lobelia oligophylla is an ornamental plant in the Campanulaceae family.

== Description ==
It is a mat-forming species, growing to 20 cm or more in diameter. It has elliptical to broadly ovate or orbicular leaves about 1 cm long, that are somewhat folded upwards along the midrib. It produces numerous laterally symmetrical, star shaped pink flowers on short stalks, covering the mat.

Propagation is by simple division of the much rooting stems in spring or by seed.

== Habitat ==
It can be found from the Ecuadorean Andes to Tierra del Fuego, in moist, usually open places.

It is an ideal ornamental plant for areas that are fairly humus rich and do not dry out, for instance alongside ponds, waterfalls and on shaded areas of rock gardens.

== Taxonomy ==
It was previously known as Hypsela reniformis, but because the genus Hypsela is part of the enlarged genus Lobelia it had to be transferred. Its epithet changed because the name Lobelia reniformis was not available for it, as it was already in use for another species. The name Lobelia oligophylla was therefore reinstated.

== In culture ==
Charles Darwin sampled the plant and recorded it during the second voyage of HMS Beagle in the 1830s.
