= Sampera pichinchensis =

Conservation status
- Near Threatened (IUCN 3.1)

Scientific classification
- Kingdom: Plantae
- Clade: Embryophytes
- Clade: Tracheophytes
- Clade: Angiosperms
- Clade: Eudicots
- Clade: Asterids
- Order: Asterales
- Family: Asteraceae
- Genus: Sampera
- Species: S. pichinchensis

Binomial name
- Sampera pichinchensis (Hieron.) V.A.Funk & H.Rob.

Synonyms
- Liabum pichinchense Hieron.; Oligactis pichinchensis (Hieron.) H.Rob. & Brettell; Liabum hallii Hieron.; Oligactis hallii (Hieron.) H.Rob. & Brettell

Species of flowering plant

Sampera pichinchensis, synonym Oligactis pichinchensis, is a species of flowering plant in the family Asteraceae. It is found only in Ecuador. Its natural habitats are subtropical or tropical moist montane forests and subtropical or tropical high-altitude shrubland. It is threatened by habitat loss.
