= Sampera ecuadoriensis =

Conservation status
- Vulnerable (IUCN 3.1)

Scientific classification
- Kingdom: Plantae
- Clade: Embryophytes
- Clade: Tracheophytes
- Clade: Angiosperms
- Clade: Eudicots
- Clade: Asterids
- Order: Asterales
- Family: Asteraceae
- Genus: Sampera
- Species: S. ecuadoriensis

Binomial name
- Sampera ecuadoriensis (Hieron.) V.A.Funk & H.Rob.

Synonyms
- Liabum ecuadoriense Hieron.; Oligactis ecuadoriensis (Hieron.) H.Rob. & Brettell

Species of flowering plant

Sampera ecuadoriensis, synonym Oligactis ecuadoriensis, is a species of flowering plant in the family Asteraceae. It is found only in Ecuador. Its natural habitat is subtropical or tropical moist montane forests. It is threatened by habitat loss.
