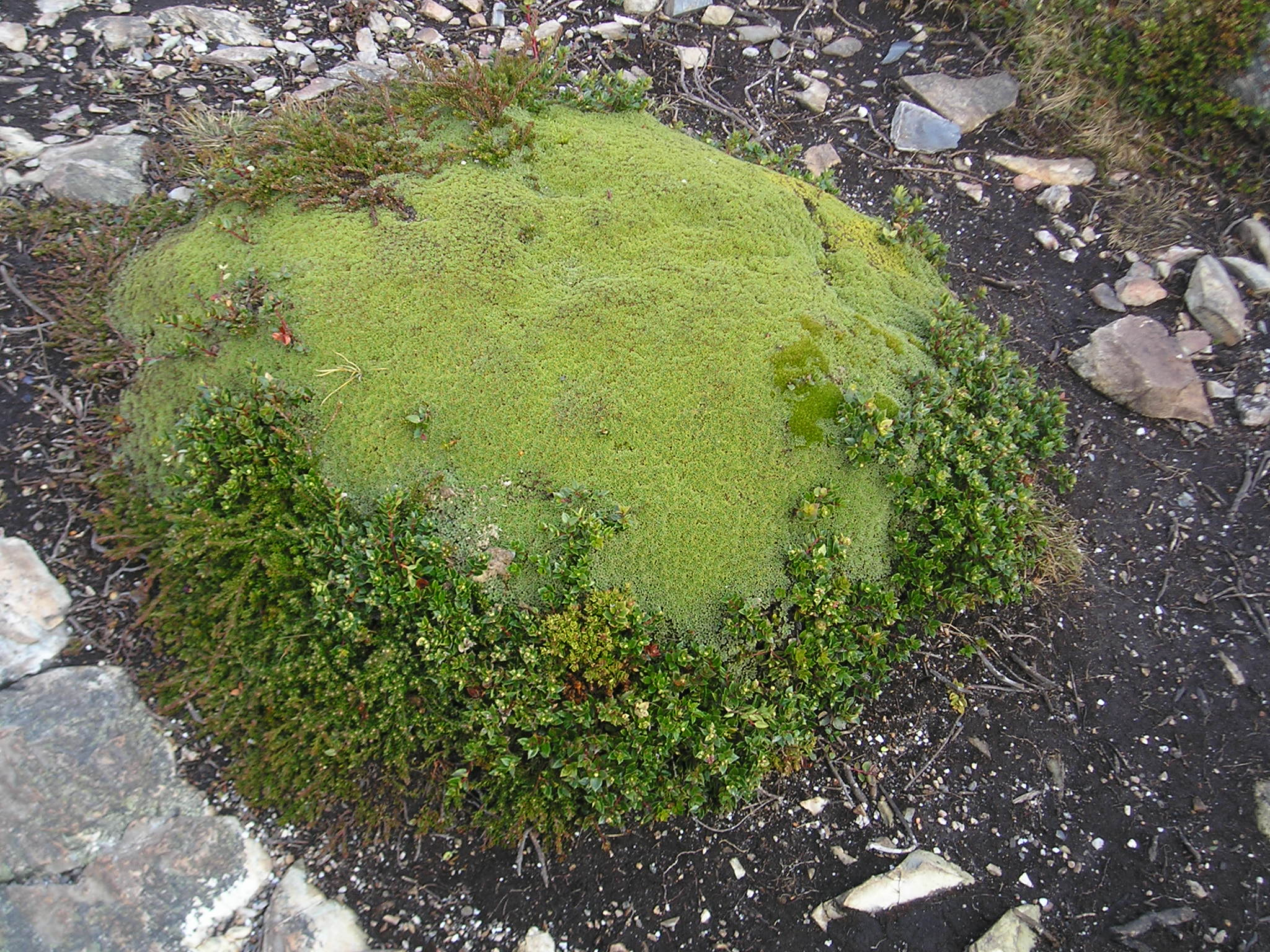
- Azorella compacta

Scientific classification
- Kingdom: Plantae
- Clade: Tracheophytes
- Clade: Angiosperms
- Clade: Eudicots
- Clade: Asterids
- Order: Apiales
- Family: Apiaceae
- Subfamily: Azorelloideae
- Genus: Azorella; Lam.

Species
- See text.

Synonyms
- Apleura Phil.; Azorellopsis H.Wolff; Chamitis Banks ex Gaertn.; Fragosa Ruiz & Pav.; Huanaca Cav.; Kirkophytum (Harms) Allan; Laretia Gillies & Hook.; Lechleria Phil.; Mulinum Pers.; Pectophytum Kunth; Schizeilema Domin; Stilbocarpa (Hook.f.) Decne. & Planch.; Trisciadium Phil.

= Azorella =

Genus of plants

Azorella is a genus of flowering plants in the family Apiaceae, native to South America, New Zealand, southeastern Australia, and the islands of the Southern Ocean.

They are low-growing dwarf mat-forming plants growing in high exposure on mountains and subantarctic coasts; with great age they may form rounded mounds of foliage up to 1 m high but are usually less than 10 cm high. Several species are grown as ornamental plants in rock gardens.

== Species ==
As of December 2022, Plants of the World Online accepted 58 species:

- Azorella acaulis (Cav.) Drude
- Azorella albovaginata (Gillies & Hook.) G.M.Plunkett & A.N.Nicolas
- Azorella allanii (Cheeseman) G.M.Plunkett & A.N.Nicolas
- Azorella ameghinoi Speg.
- Azorella andina (Phil.) Drude
- Azorella aretioides (Kunth) Willd. ex DC.
- Azorella biloba (Schltdl.) Wedd.
- Azorella boelckei (Mathias & Constance) G.M.Plunkett & A.N.Nicolas
- Azorella burkartii (Mathias & Constance) G.M.Plunkett & A.N.Nicolas
- Azorella cockaynei Diels
- Azorella colensoi (Domin) G.M.Plunkett & A.N.Nicolas
- Azorella compacta Phil.
- Azorella corymbosa (Ruiz & Pav.) Pers.
- Azorella crassipes Phil.
- Azorella crenata (Ruiz & Pav.) Pers.
- Azorella cryptantha (Clos) Reiche
- Azorella cuatrecasasii Mathias & Constance
- Azorella diapensioides A.Gray
- Azorella diversifolia Clos
- Azorella echegarayi (Hieron.) G.M.Plunkett & A.N.Nicolas
- Azorella exigua (Hook.f.) Drude
- Azorella filamentosa Lam.
- Azorella fragosea (F.Muell.) Druce
- Azorella fuegiana Speg.
- Azorella haastii (Hook.f.) Drude
- Azorella hallei (Skottsb.) G.M.Plunkett & A.N.Nicolas
- Azorella hookeri Drude
- Azorella hydrocotyloides (Hook.f.) Kirk
- Azorella julianii Mathias & Constance
- Azorella lyallii (J.B.Armstr.) G.M.Plunkett & A.N.Nicolas
- Azorella lycopodioides Gaudich.
- Azorella macquariensis Orchard
- Azorella madreporica Clos
- Azorella microphylla (Cav.) G.M.Plunkett & A.N.Nicolas
- Azorella monantha Clos
- Azorella monteroi S.Martínez & Constance
- Azorella multifida (Ruiz & Pav.) Pers.
- Azorella nitens Petrie
- Azorella nivalis Phil.
- Azorella pallida (Kirk) Kirk
- Azorella patagonica Speg.
- Azorella pedunculata (Spreng.) Mathias & Constance
- Azorella polaris (Hombr. & Jacquinot) G.M.Plunkett & A.N.Nicolas
- Azorella prolifera (Cav.) G.M.Plunkett & A.N.Nicolas
- Azorella pulvinata Wedd.
- Azorella ranunculus d'Urv.
- Azorella robusta (Kirk) G.M.Plunkett & A.N.Nicolas
- Azorella roughii (Hook.f.) Kirk
- Azorella ruizii G.M.Plunkett & A.N.Nicolas
- Azorella schizeilema G.M.Plunkett & A.N.Nicolas
- Azorella selago Hook.f.
- Azorella spinosa (Ruiz & Pav.) Pers.
- Azorella triacantha (Griseb.) Mart.Fernández & C.I.Calviño
- Azorella trifoliolata Clos
- Azorella trifurcata (Gaertn.) Pers.
- Azorella trisecta (H.Wolff) Mart.Fernández & C.I.Calviño
- Azorella ulicina (Gillies & Hook.) G.M.Plunkett & A.N.Nicolas
- Azorella valentini (Speg.) Mart.Fernández & C.I.Calviño
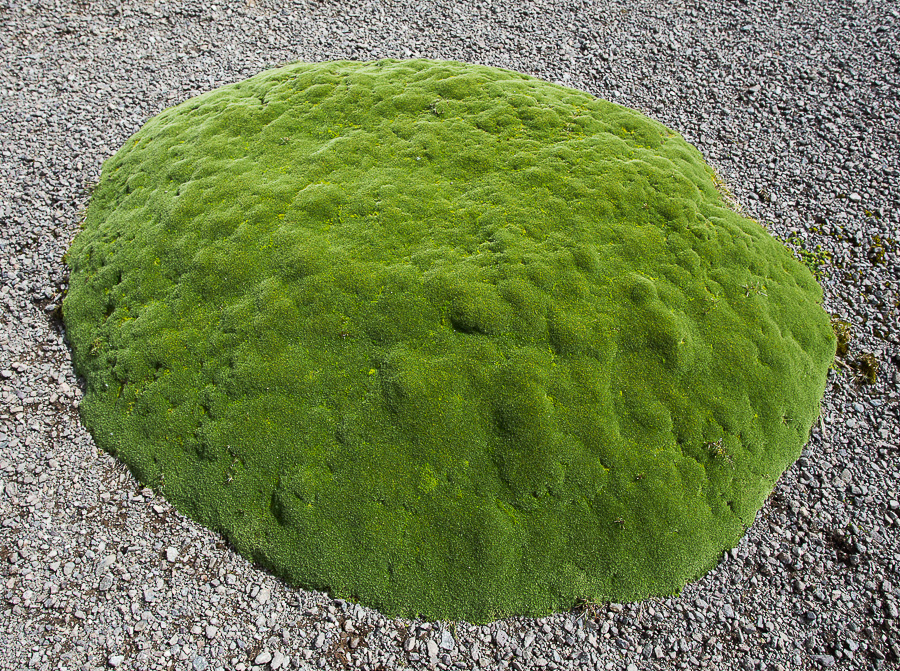
Azorella on Macquarie Island

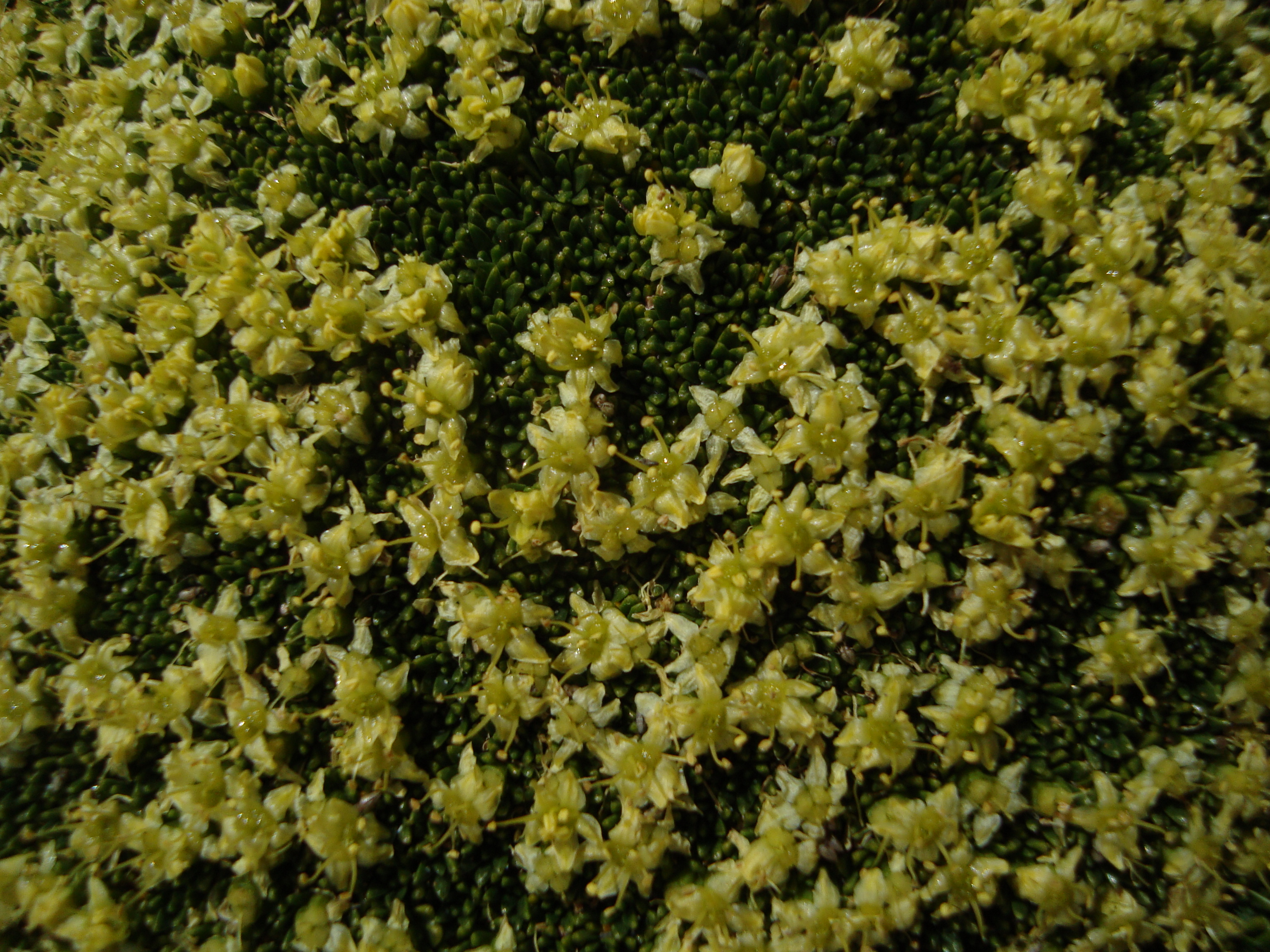
Flowers of Azorella monantha
