= Azorella diapensioides =

Scientific classification
- Kingdom: Plantae
- Clade: Tracheophytes
- Clade: Angiosperms
- Clade: Eudicots
- Clade: Asterids
- Order: Apiales
- Family: Apiaceae
- Genus: Azorella
- Species: A. diapensioides

Binomial name
- Azorella diapensioides A.Gray

Species of flowering plant

Azorella diapensioides is a species of flowering plant in the genus Azorella found in Peru and Bolivia.
