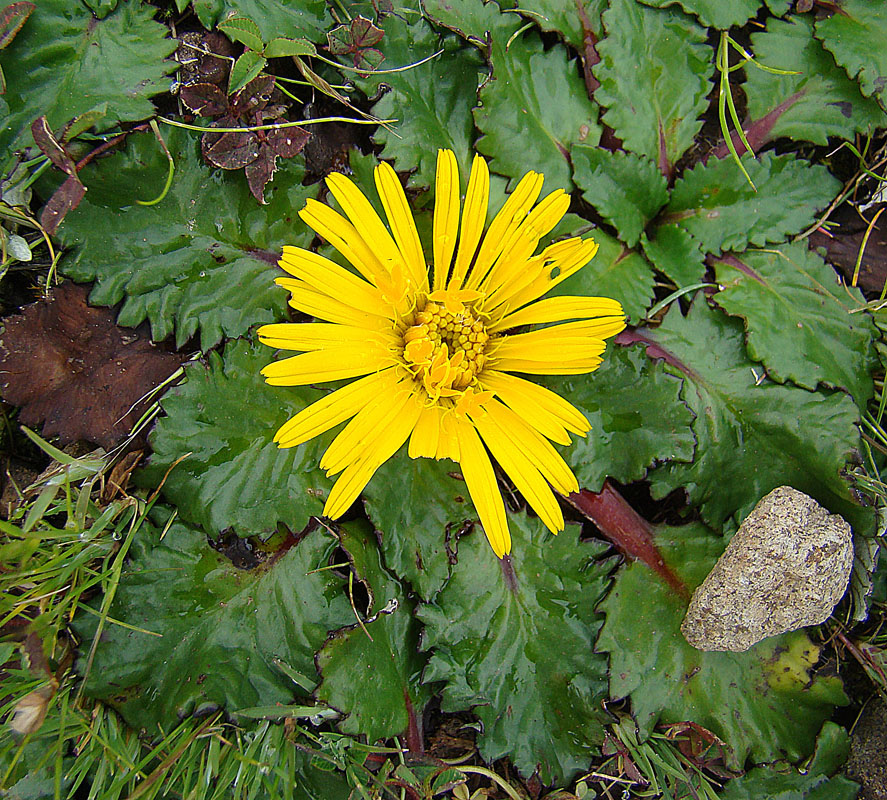
- Paranephelius ovatus

Scientific classification
- Kingdom: Plantae
- Clade: Tracheophytes
- Clade: Angiosperms
- Clade: Eudicots
- Clade: Asterids
- Order: Asterales
- Family: Asteraceae
- Subfamily: Vernonioideae
- Tribe: Liabeae
- Subtribe: Paranepheliinae
- Genus: Paranephelius; Poepp.

Type species
- Paranephelius uniflorus Poepp.

Synonyms
- Liabum sect. Paranephelius (Poepp.) Benth. & Hook.f.

= Paranephelius =

Genus of flowering plants

Paranephelius is a genus of South American plants in the tribe Liabeae within the family Asteraceae.

Species

- Paranephelius asperifolius (Muschl.) H.Rob. & Brettell - Bolivia, Salta
- Paranephelius bullatus A.Gray ex Wedd. - Huánuco
- Paranephelius ferreyrii H.Rob. - Cajamarca, La Libertad
- Paranephelius jelskii (Hieron.) H.Rob. & Brettell - Peru
- Paranephelius ovatus A.Gray ex Wedd. - Bolivia, Peru
- Paranephelius uniflorus Poepp. - Bolivia, Peru, Ecuador
- Paranephelius wurdackii H.Rob. - Peruvian Amazonas, Cajamarca
