= Hatun Wayq'u =

- Etymology: Quechua

Location
- Country: Peru
- Region: Cusco Region

Physical characteristics
- Source
  - location: Vilcabamba District
  - coordinates: 13°12′13″S 73°03′28″W
  - elevation: 4,700 m (15,400 ft)
- Mouth: Apurímac River
  - location: Chungui District, Vilcabamba District
  - coordinates: 13°07′00″S 73°26′55″W

The Hatun Wayq'u (Quechua hatun big, wayq'u brook or valley, "big brook (or valley)", hispanicized spellings Hatunhuaico, Jatunhuayco) which downstream successively is named T'uruyunka (Toroyunca) and Chuqisayra (Choquesayra) is a river in Peru. It is located in the Cusco Region, La Convención Province, Vilcabamba District. It belongs to the watershed of the Apurímac River, the source of the Amazon River.

The Hatun Wayq'u originates from various streams north and northeast of the peak of Suyruqucha at heights of approximately 4,700 m (15,400 ft). Its direction is mainly to the northwest. It receives waters from a stream named the Ñañu Wayq'u ("thin brook"), a left tributary which originates north of a mountain named Ñañu Wayq'u, and from another stream which is also named Hatun Wayq'u or Qullaqucha brook (Collacocha), later called T'utura (Totora), as a left affluent.

This westernmore stream, Hatun Wayq'u or Qullaqucha, originates northeast of P'anta near 13°13′24″S 73°05′08″W. One of its left affluents is Chawpi Wayq'u ("central brook", Chaupehuaico), also known as Muñaqucha brook (Muñacocha) which originates north of Asulqucha.

Hatun Wayq'u is a right tributary of the Apurímac River. On its way it flows along Parquy, a little populated place, and Parquyqucha ("irrigation lake"). The peaks of P'anta, Asulqucha, Chuqisapra and Sut'uq Mach'ay successively appear on the left side. The confluence with the Apurímac River is on the border of the Ayacucho Region, La Mar Province, Chungui District, and the Vilcabamba District.
