= Chuchaujasa =

Mountain in Peru

- Location within Peru

Highest point
- Elevation: 4,800 m (15,700 ft)
- Coordinates: 13°10′17″S 73°03′18″W

Geography
- Location: Peru, Cusco Region
- Parent range: Andes, Vilcabamba

Chuchaujasa (Quechua chuchaw agave, q'asa mountain pass, "agave pass") is a mountain in the northwest of the Vilcabamba mountain range in the Andes of Peru, about 4,800 metres (15,748 ft) high. It is situated in the Cusco Region, La Convención Province, Vilcabamba District. Chuchaujasa lies west of Quenuaorco and northeast of Azulcocha and Panta at a brook or valley named Hatun Wayq'u ("big brook (or valley)").
