= Jatun Huamanripa =

Mountain in Peru

- Location within Peru

Highest point
- Elevation: 4,601 m (15,095 ft)
- Coordinates: 13°12′11″S 73°06′12″W

Naming
- Language of name: Quechua

Geography
- Location: Peru, Cusco Region
- Parent range: Andes, Vilcabamba

Jatun Huamanripa (possibly from Quechua hatun big, wamanripa Senecio or a species of it, also applied for Laccopetalum giganteum, "big wamanripa (mountain)") is a 4,601-metre-high (15,095 ft) mountain in the Vilcabamba mountain range in the Andes of Peru. It is located in the Cusco Region, La Convención Province, Vilcabamba District. Jatun Huamanripa lies southwest of a mountain named Nañuhuaico, northwest of Panta and northeast of Azulcocha. It is between the Chaupehuaico ("central brook") in the west, also known as Muñacocha brook, and the westernmost of two neighbouring rivers named Jatun Huyaco ("big stream") in the east, also known as Collacocha brook.
