= Coisopacana =

Mountain in Peru

- Location within Peru

Highest point
- Elevation: 5,176 m (16,982 ft)
- Coordinates: 13°20′00″S 73°03′00″W

Geography
- Location: Peru, Cusco Region
- Parent range: Andes, Vilcabamba

Coisopacana (possibly from Quechua quysu, qhuysu a very long skirt, pakana hiding place) is a mountain in the Vilcabamba mountain range in the Andes of Peru, about 5,176 metres (16,982 ft) high. It is located in the Cusco Region, La Convención Province, Vilcabamba District. Coisopacana lies southwest of Pumasillo, southeast of Panta and north of the Apurimac River.
