= Inkawasi District =

Inkawasi District Distrito de Inkawasi
- District
- Interactive map of Inkawasi District
- Coordinates: 13.289°S 73.265°W
- Country: Peru
- Region: Cusco
- Province: La Convención
- Founded: November 19, 2014
- Capital: Amaybamba
- Time zone: UTC-5 (PET)

Inkawasi is one of fourteen districts of the La Convención Province in the Cusco Region of Peru. The district has an area of 773 square kilometres (298 sq mi) and a population in 2017 of 4,285. The capital of the district is Amaybamba with a population of 646 in 2017 and located at an elevation of 1,768 metres (5,801 ft). Incawasi is in the drainage basin of the Apurimac River, one of the major upstream sources of the Amazon River.

Incawasi was created on November 19, 2014, by Law No. 30265. It is bordered to the north and to the east by the Vilcabamba District of the La Convención Province, to the south by the Huanipaca District of the Abancay Province, and the Pacobamba District of the Andahuaylas Province in the Apurímac Region, and to the west and northwest by the Chungui District of the La Mar Province in the Ayacucho Region. The territory of the Inkawasi District formerly belonged to the Vilcabamba District.

== See also ==
Mountains

- Asulqucha
- Chuqisapra
- P'anta
- Sut'uq Mach'ay
