= Pumasillo (Pumasillococha) =

Mountain in Peru

- Location within Peru

Highest point
- Elevation: 5,100 m (16,700 ft)
- Coordinates: 13°15′22″S 72°56′58″W

Geography
- Location: Peru, Cusco Region
- Parent range: Andes, Vilcabamba

Pumasillo (possibly from Quechua puma cougar, sillu claw, "puma's claw") is a mountain in the Vilcabamba mountain range in the Andes of Peru which reaches a height of approximately 5,100 metres (16,732 ft). It is situated in the Cusco Region, La Convención Province, on the border of the districts of Santa Teresa and Vilcabamba. Pumasillo lies southwest of Choquetacarpo and Cayco at a lake named Pumasillococha (possibly from in the Quechua spelling Pumasilluqucha).
