= Quriwayrachina =

Quriwayrachina (Quechua, other spellings Qori Huayrachina, Qori Wayrachina, Ccorihuayrachina, Ccoriwayrachina, Corihuayrachina, Coriwayrachina, Qorihuayrachina, Qoriwayrachina, Q'oriwayrachina) may refer to:

- Quriwayrachina, Anta, an archaeological site in the Anta Province, Cusco Region, Peru
- Quriwayrachina, Ayacucho, an archaeological site in the Ayacucho Region, Peru
- Quriwayrachina, La Convención, an archaeological site in the Vilcabamba District, La Convención Province, Cusco Region, Peru
- Quriwayrachina (Vilcabamba), a mountain in the Vilcabamba District, La Convención Province, Cusco Region, Peru
