= Santa Teresa District =

Coordinates: 13°07′47″S 72°35′55″W

Santa Teresa
- District
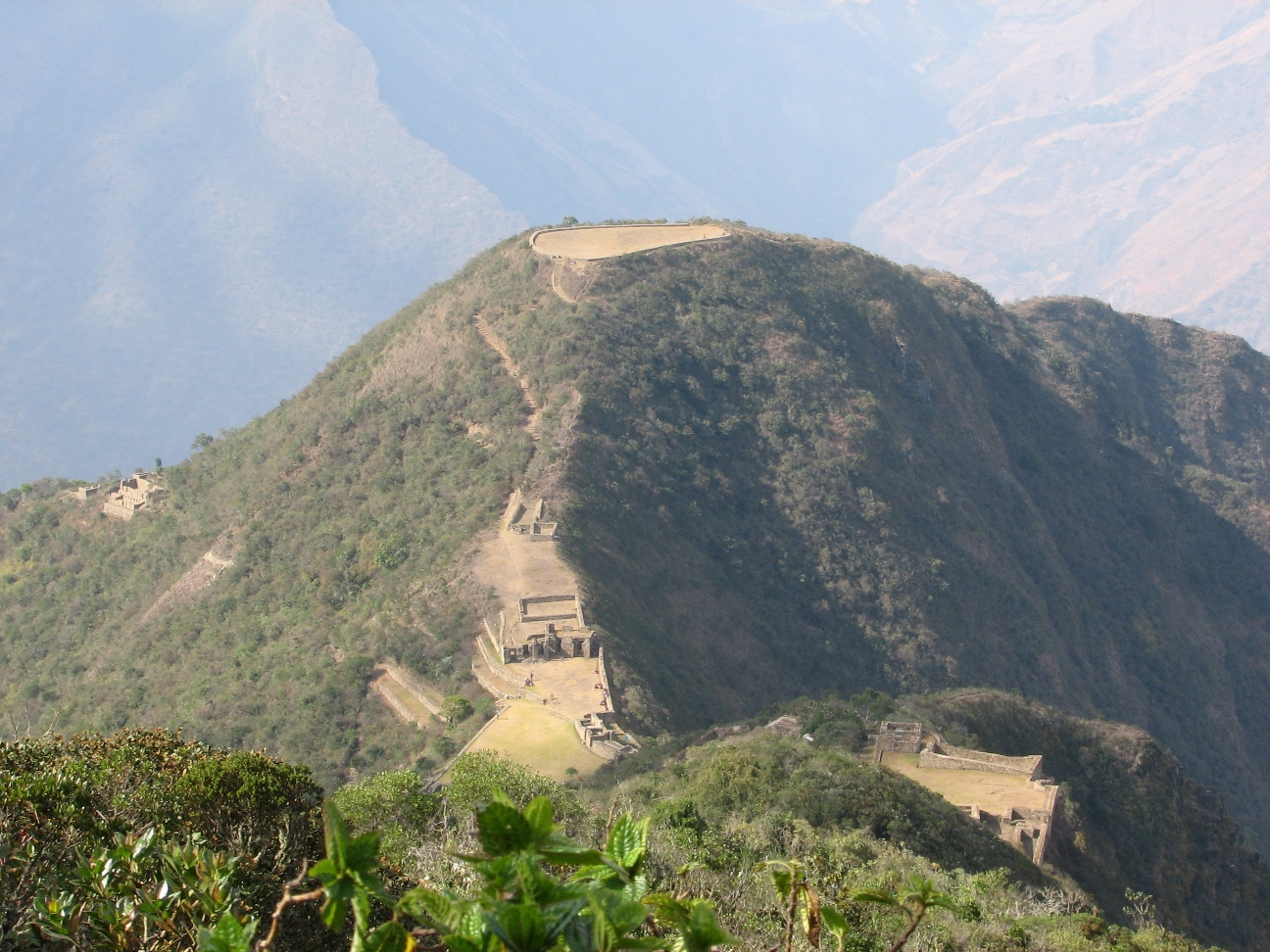
- Choquequirao
- Interactive map of Santa Teresa
- Country: Peru
- Region: Cusco
- Province: La Convención
- Founded: October 11, 1957
- Capital: Santa Teresa

Government
  - Mayor: Marcos Reynaldo Vargas Contreras

Area
  - Total: 1,340.38 km^{2} (517.52 sq mi)
- Elevation: 1,550 m (5,090 ft)

Population (2017)
  - Total: 5,972
  - Density: 4.455/km^{2} (11.54/sq mi)
- Time zone: UTC-5 (PET)
- UBIGEO: 080908

Santa Teresa District is one of ten districts of the La Convención Province in the Cusco Region of Peru.

Santa Teresa, Peru is situated 6.5 km northwest of Machu Picchu and is at the axis of several important routes leading to this archeological centre, including alternative paths ways to the ruins (previously the railway was the only means of reaching Machu Picchu). In 1998, a landslide completely buried the town and destroyed the bridge that connected it to Machu Picchu and Cusco, however the bridge has subsequently been rebuilt.

== Geography ==
The Willkapampa mountain range traverses the district. One of the highest peaks of the district is Kiswar at 5,771 m (18,934 ft). The highest peak in the range is Salkantay at 6,271 m (20,574 ft). Other mountains are listed below:

- Chawpimayu
- Chuqitakarpu
- Kiswar
- Puka Puka
- Phaqcha
- Salkantay
- Qayqu
- Qayqu (near Pumasillu)

== See also ==
- Llaqtapata
- Quriwayrachina
