= Kaiko (mountain) =

Mountain in Peru

- Location within Peru

Highest point
- Elevation: 5,265 m (17,274 ft)
- Coordinates: 13°12′45″S 72°50′53″W

Geography
- Location: Peru, Cusco Region
- Parent range: Andes, Vilcabamba

Kaiko (possibly Quechua for a type of hunt) is a 5,265-metre-high (17,274 ft) mountain in the Vilcabamba mountain range in the Andes of Peru. It is situated in the Cusco Region, La Convención Province, on the border of the districts of Santa Teresa and Vilcabamba. Kaiko lies northeast of Choquetacarpo and northwest of Pumasillo.
