= Quenuaorco =

Mountain in Peru

- Location within Peru

Highest point
- Elevation: 4,900 m (16,100 ft)
- Coordinates: 13°10′39″S 73°00′38″W

Geography
- Location: Peru, Cusco Region
- Parent range: Andes, Vilcabamba mountain range

Quenuaorco (possibly from Quechua kinwa quinoa, urqu mountain, "quinoa mountain") is a mountain in the northwestern part of the Vilcabamba mountain range in the Andes of Peru, about 4,900 metres (16,076 ft) high. It is situated in the Cusco Region, La Convención Province, Vilcabamba District. Quenuaorco lies northeast of Choquesafra and the Panta group, and northwest of Choquetacarpo. The nearest town is Vilcabamba northeast of the mountain.
