= Chaupimayo =

Mountain in Peru

- Location within Peru

Highest point
- Elevation: 5,239 m (17,188 ft)
- Coordinates: 13°11′44″S 72°47′44″W

Geography
- Location: Peru, Cusco Region
- Parent range: Andes, Vilcabamba

Chaupimayo (possibly from Quechua chawpi central, middle, mayu river) is a 5,239-metre-high (17,188 ft) mountain in the Vilcabamba mountain range in the Andes of Peru. It is situated in the Cusco Region, La Convención Province, on the border of the districts of Santa Teresa and Vilcabamba. Chaupimayo lies northeast of Choquetacarpo and Pumasillo.
