= Nañuhuaico =

Mountain in Peru

- Location within Peru

Highest point
- Elevation: 4,932 m (16,181 ft)
- Coordinates: 13°11′57″S 73°04′31″W

Naming
- Language of name: Quechua

Geography
- Location: Peru, Cusco Region
- Parent range: Andes, Vilcabamba

Nañuhuaico (possibly from Quechua ñañu thin (cylindrical objects), slim, wayq'u brook, "thin brook") is a 4,932-metre-high (16,181 ft) mountain in the Vilcabamba mountain range in the Andes of Peru. It is located in the Cusco Region, La Convención Province, Vilcabamba District. Nañuhuaico lies northwest of a mountain named Soirococha and north of a lake of that name, northeast of Panta.

Nañuhuaico (erroneously spelled Nunahuayco) is also the name of a stream which originates north of the mountain. It is a left affluent of the Hatun Wayq'u ("big brook") in the north whose waters flow to the Apurímac River as a right tributary.
