= Paccha (mountain) =

Mountain in Peru

- Location within Peru

Highest point
- Elevation: 5,210 m (17,090 ft)
- Coordinates: 13°16′24″S 72°51′36″W

Geography
- Location: Peru, Cusco Region
- Parent range: Andes, Vilcabamba

Paccha (Quechua for waterfall) is a 5,210-metre-high (17,090 ft) mountain in the Vilcabamba mountain range in the Andes of Peru. It is situated in the Cusco Region, La Convención Province, Santa Teresa District. Paccha lies southwest of Pumasillo and south of Pucapuca.
