= Puncuyoc =

Mountain in Peru

- Location within Peru

Highest point
- Elevation: 4,400 m (14,400 ft)
- Coordinates: 13°05′35″S 72°16′25″W

Geography
- Location: Peru, Cusco Region
- Parent range: Andes

Puncuyoc (possibly from Quechua punku door, -yuq a suffix, "the one with a door") is a mountain north of the Urubamba mountain range in the Andes of Peru, about 4,400 m (14,400 ft) high. It is located in the Cusco Region, La Convención Province, Ocobamba District. Puncuyoc lies northeast of Llaulliyoc.
