= Solocmachay =

Mountain in Peru

Geography
- Location: Peru, Cusco Region
- Parent range: Andes, Vilcabamba

Solocmachay (possibly from Quechua sut'uy to drip, -y a suffix, mach'ay cave, "drippy cave") is a mountain in the Vilcabamba mountain range in the Andes of Peru. It is located in the Cusco Region, La Convención Province, on the border of the districts of Inkawasi and Vilcabamba. Solocmachay lies northwest of Choquesafra.
