= Cayco (Cusco) =

Mountain in Peru

- Location within Peru

Highest point
- Elevation: 5,108 m (16,759 ft)
- Coordinates: 13°14′57″S 72°54′33″W

Geography
- Location: Peru, Cusco Region
- Parent range: Andes, Vilcabamba

Cayco (possibly from Quechua for a type of hunt) is a 5,108-metre-high (16,759 ft) mountain in the Vilcabamba mountain range in the Andes of Peru. It is situated in the Cusco Region, La Convención Province, on the border of the districts of Santa Teresa and Vilcabamba. Cayco lies southwest of Choquetacarpo and northeast of Pumasillo and a lake named Pumasillococha (possibly from in the Quechua spelling Pumasilluqucha).
