= Mandorcasa =

Mountain in Peru

- Location within Peru

Highest point
- Elevation: 4,800 m (15,700 ft)
- Coordinates: 13°13′19″S 72°56′56″W

Geography
- Location: Peru, Cusco Region
- Parent range: Andes, Vilcabamba

Mandorcasa (possibly from Quechua mantur achiote, q'asa mountain pass) is a mountain in the northwest of the Vilcabamba mountain range in the Andes of Peru, about 4,800 metres (15,748 ft) high. It is situated in the Cusco Region, La Convención Province, Vilcabamba District. Mandorcasa lies west of Choquetacarpo.
