= Corihuayrachina (Vilcabamba) =

Mountain in Peru

- Location within Peru

Highest point
- Elevation: 5,404 m (17,730 ft)
- Coordinates: 13°21′06″S 72°49′15″W

Geography
- Location: Peru, Cusco Region
- Parent range: Andes, Vilcabamba

Corihuayrachina (possibly from Quechua quri gold, wayrachina a special oven for smelting metal, "oven for smelting gold"), erroneously also Corihuaynachina, is a mountain in the Vilcabamba mountain range in the Andes of Peru, about 5,404 metres (17,730 ft) high. It is situated in the Cusco Region, La Convención Province, Vilcabamba District, at a little lake named Corihuayrachina. Corihuayrachina lies south of the Pumasillo massif and west of Padreyoc. The archaeological sites of Corihuayrachina and Choquequirao (possibly from the Quechua spelling Chuqik'iraw) are west and southwest of the mountain Corihuayrachina.
