= Vitcos =

Archaeological site in Peru

- Rosaspata
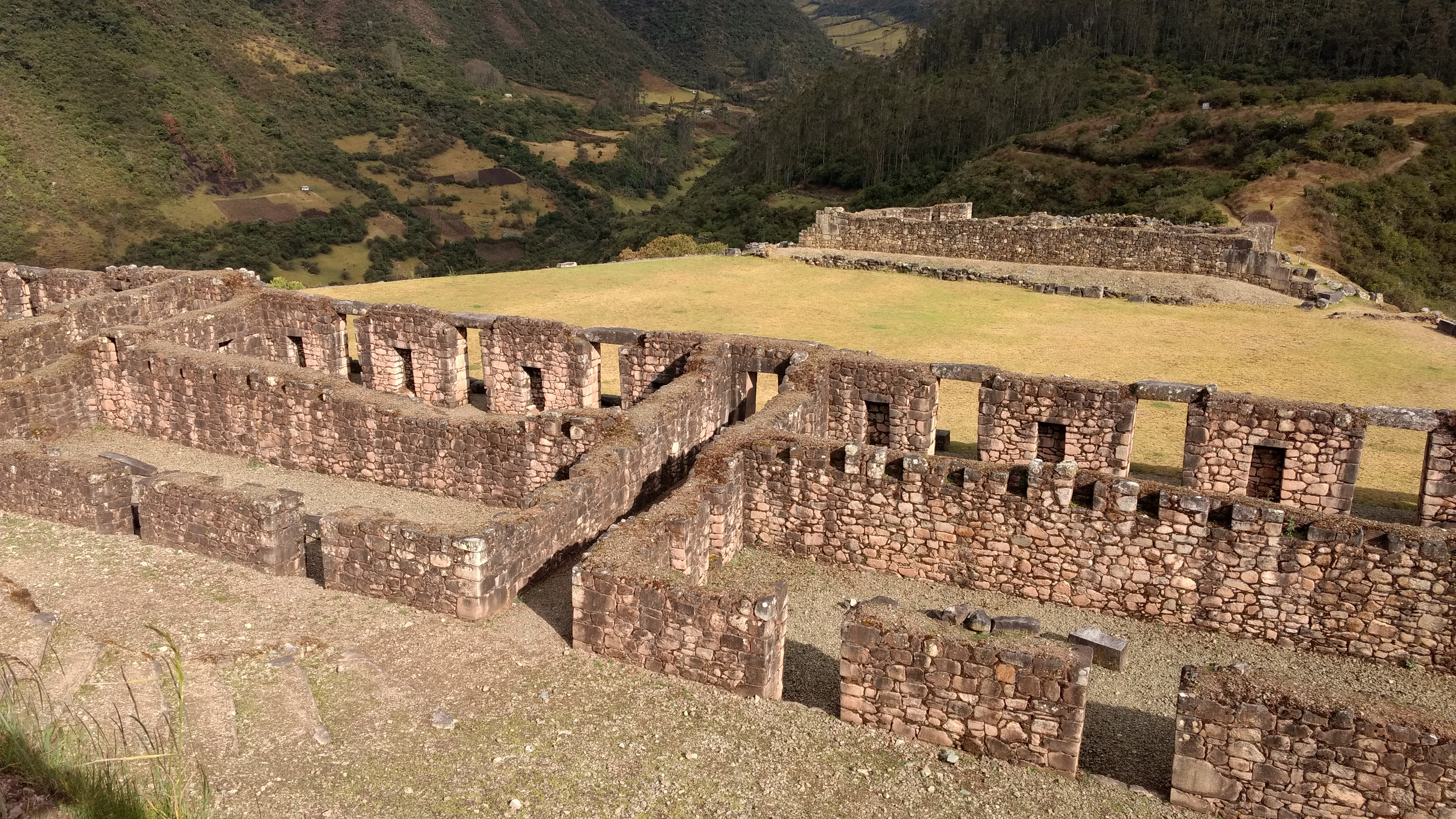
- Vitcos (Rosaspata) archaeological site

- Location within Peru
- 13°05′54″S 72°55′55″W
- Type: ruins
- Cultures: Inca
- Location: Cusco Region, Peru

History
- Built: c. 1450 CE
- Abandoned: 1572 CE

Site notes
- Condition: In ruins

Vitcos was a residence of Inca nobles and a ceremonial center of the Neo-Inca State (1537–1572). The archaeological site of ancient Vitcos, called Rosaspata, is in the Vilcabamba District of La Convención Province, Cusco Region in Peru. The ruins are on a ridge overlooking the confluence of two small rivers and the village of Pucyura. The Incas had occupied Vilcabamba, the region in which Vitcos is located, about AD 1450, establishing major centers at Machu Picchu, Choquequirao, Vitcos, and Vilcabamba. Vitcos was often the residence of the rulers of the Neo-Inca state until the Spanish conquest of this last stronghold of the Incas in 1572.

The location of Vitcos was later forgotten until 1911 when explorer Hiram Bingham identified the ruins known to local Peruvians as Rosaspata (Quechua: Rusaspata) as ancient Vitcos. The ruins of the Inca ceremonial center of Ñusta Hispana (the "White Rock") are about 1 kilometre (0.62 miles) south of the Inca palace that is the outstanding feature of Rosaspata.

== History ==
After our arrival at Vitcos, a town thirty leagues away from Cuzco, we people who had accompanied my father took a break with the intention of staying and resting there for a few days. My father had a house built for his sleeping quarters, for the houses that were already there belonged to my ancestors Pachacuti Inca, Topa Inca Yupanqui, Huayna Capac, and others, whose bodies we had put there.

— Titu Cusi Yupanqui, son of Manco Inca

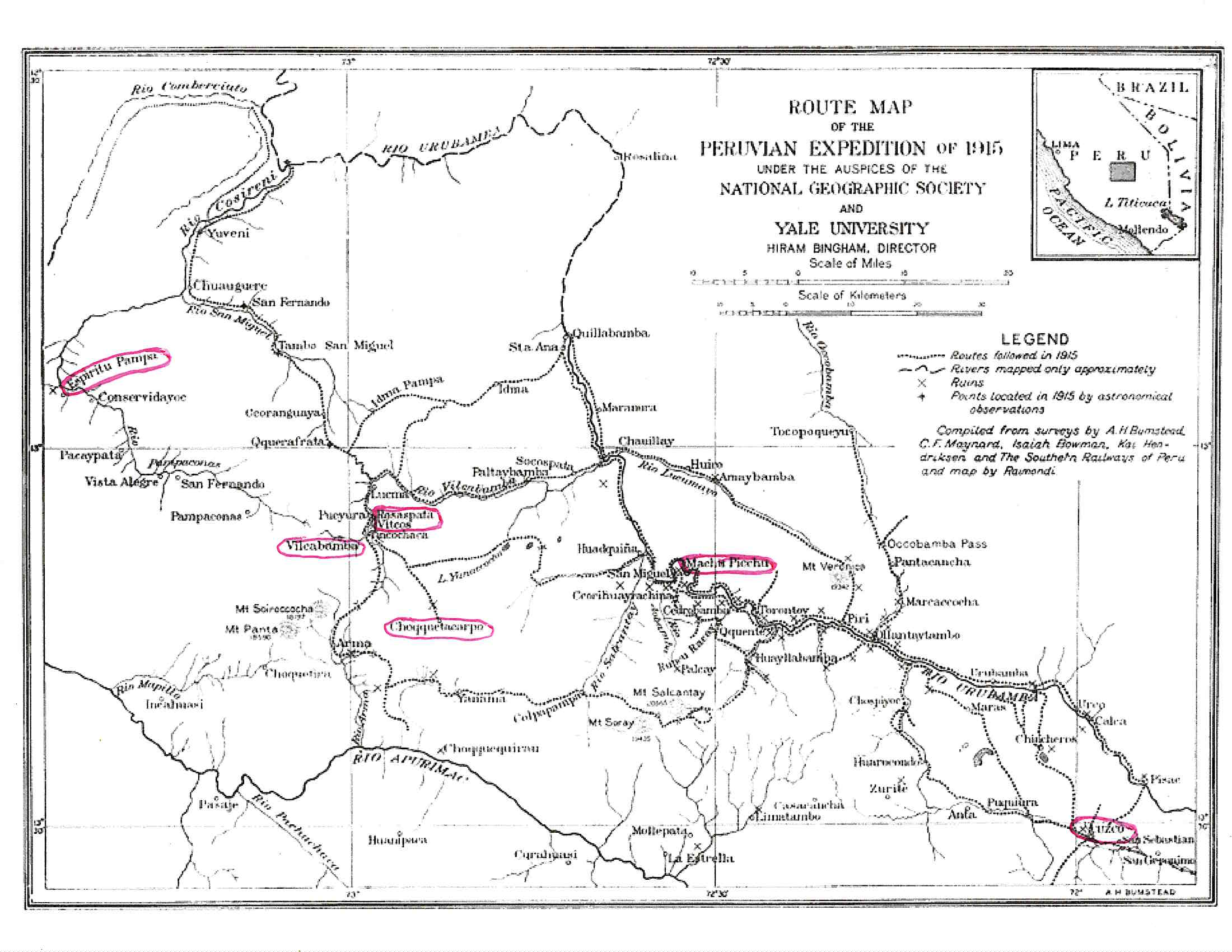
Bingham's map of the Vilcabamba region. Vitcos (Rosaspata) and other important places are circled.

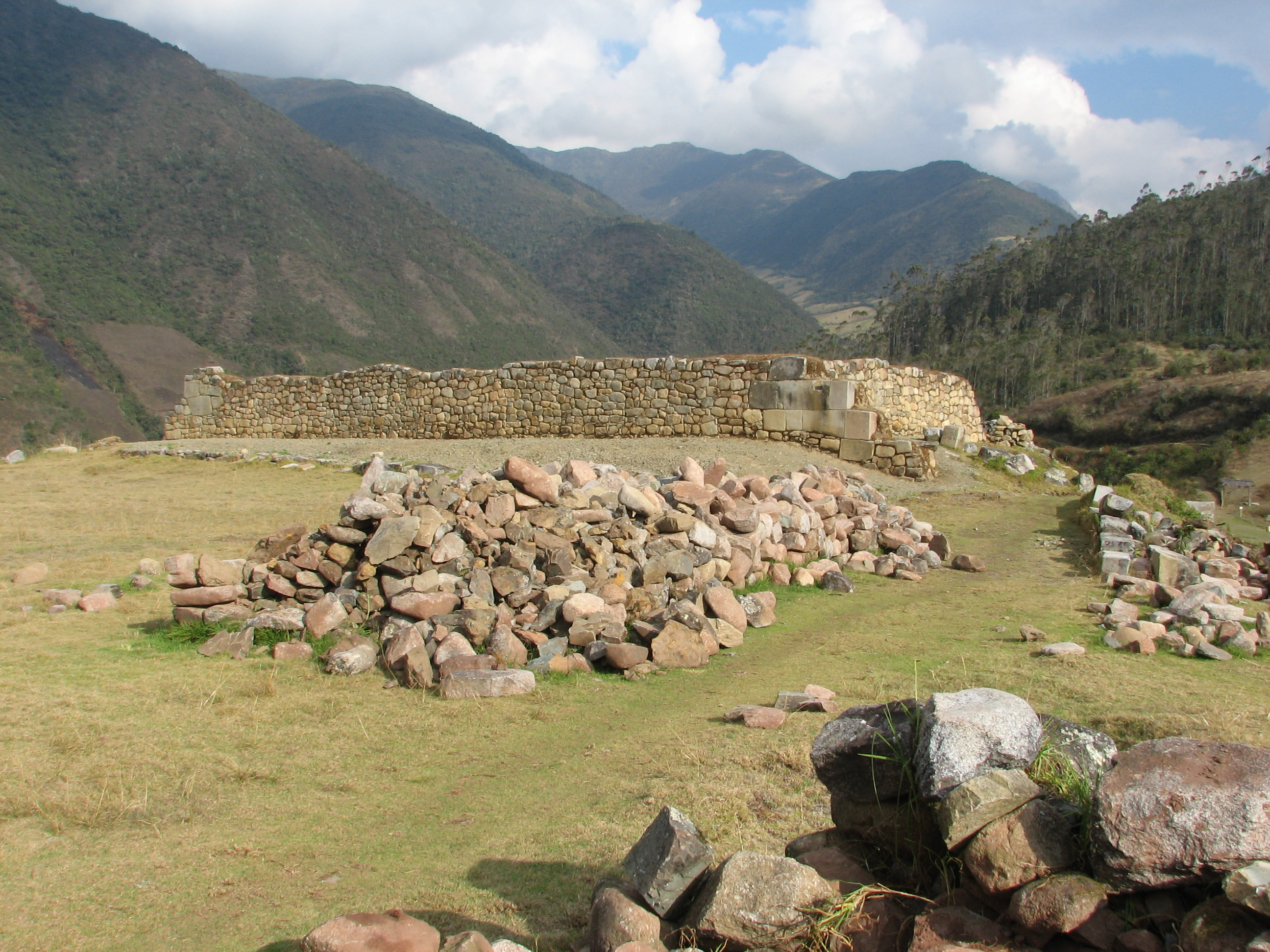

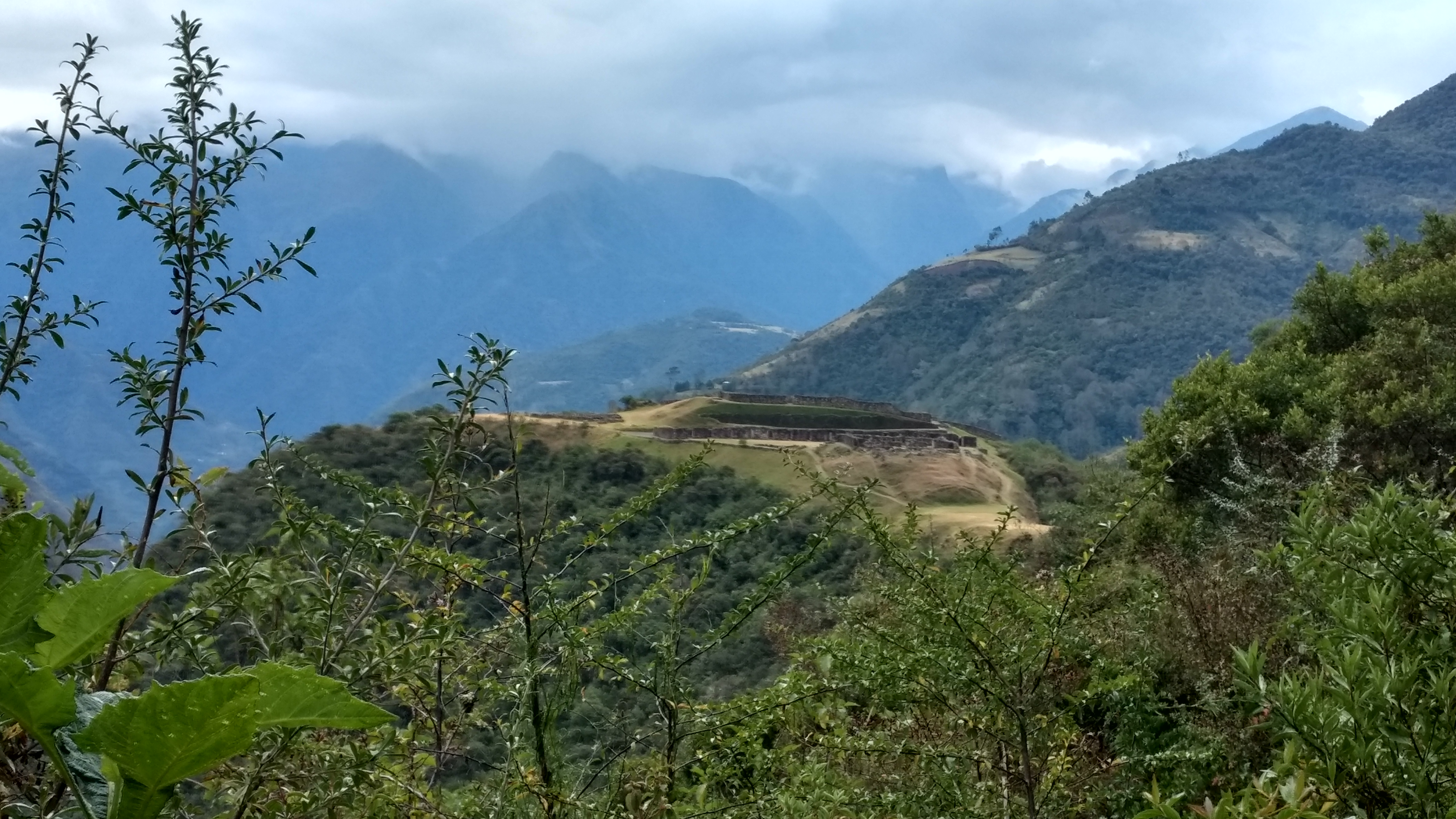

The Vilcabama region in which Vitcos is located is extremely rugged, occupying the north-eastern slopes of the Andes and sloping down to the Amazon Basin. The terrain includes snow-covered mountains, forest, lowland jungle, and rivers running through deep canyons. Access and transportation within the area was difficult and would hinder Spanish efforts to destroy the last outposts of the Inca Empire.

The Incas had occupied the Vilcabamba region since about 1450 CE, establishing major centers at Vitcos, Machu Picchu, Choquequirao, and Vilcabamba. Thus, the Incas were familiar with the region when Inca emperor, Manco Inca Yupanqui, won the Battle of Ollantaytambo against the Spanish and their Indian allies in January 1537. Despite the victory Manco was under intense pressure from the Spanish. He decided that Ollantaytambo was too close to Cusco, which was controlled by the Spanish, so he withdrew westward to Vitcos. Almagro sent his lieutenant Rodrigo Orgóñez in pursuit with 300 Spaniards and numerous Indian allies. In July 1537, Orgoñez occupied and sacked Vitcos taking many prisoners, but Manco escaped.

Manco Inca survived another Spain raid in 1539 by Gonzalo Pizarro, 300 Spanish soldiers, and Indian allies. The Spanish and the Incas fought a battle at Huayna Pukara (Huayna Fort), west of Vitcos. Several Spaniards and Indians were killed, but Manco again escaped. Pizarro stayed in the region for more than two months searching for Manco unsuccessfully, but capturing Manco's principal wife. The Spaniards wrote of the region that "great resources are needed to undertake a penetration of that land. It can be done only with very heavy expenditure." As the two Spanish raids demonstrated, Vitcos was accessible to the Spanish and Manco developed Vilcabamba as a more remote refuge. However, throughout the decades that the Neo-Inca state survived, Vitcos would continue to be the residence of many royal Incas and the site of many religious ceremonies, especially at the nearby shrine of Ñusta Hisp'ana (Yurak Rumi, also called the "White Rock). The Incas preferred Vitcos as a place of residence because of its higher elevation (2,980 metres (9,780 ft)) than Vilcabamba (1,450 metres (4,760 ft)). Vitcos has a cooler climate and the environment was more similar to the highland home of the Incas.

Spanish attempts to conquer Vilcabamba floundered because of internecine warfare among the Spaniards. A group of seven Spanish renegades, included the assassin of Francisco Pizzaro, took refuge with Manco Inca. In 1544, they murdered him in Vitcos in an attempt to win back favor with the Spanish crown. The Spanish fled, but Manco's guards pursued and killed them. The decades following Manco's death were mostly peaceful as the Incas survived in the remote remnant of their empire while the Spanish were consolidating their conquest elsewhere.

In 1570, relations between the Spanish and the Incas were sufficiently friendly that two Roman Catholic friars were allowed to settle in villages near Vitcos. The friars repaid their hosts by leading their congregation in an attack which damaged the shrine of Ňusta Hisp'ana. One of the priests was expelled. The other one was killed by the Incas, accused of killing by poison Emperor Titu Cusi Yupanqui, son of Manco Inca. Titu Cusi's brother Tupac Amaru became emperor.

Tupac Amaru was much more hostile to the Spaniards than Tuti Cusi and his supporters killed an envoy sent by Vicerory Francisco de Toledo. In response Toledo ordered the invasion of Vilcabamba by two armies totaling more than 300 Spaniards and 2,000 allies, including 500 Cañari, long-time allies of the Spaniards. In June 1572, the Spanish force was successful, capturing Vitcos, Vilcabamba, and Emperor Tupac Amaru and ending the Neo Inca state.

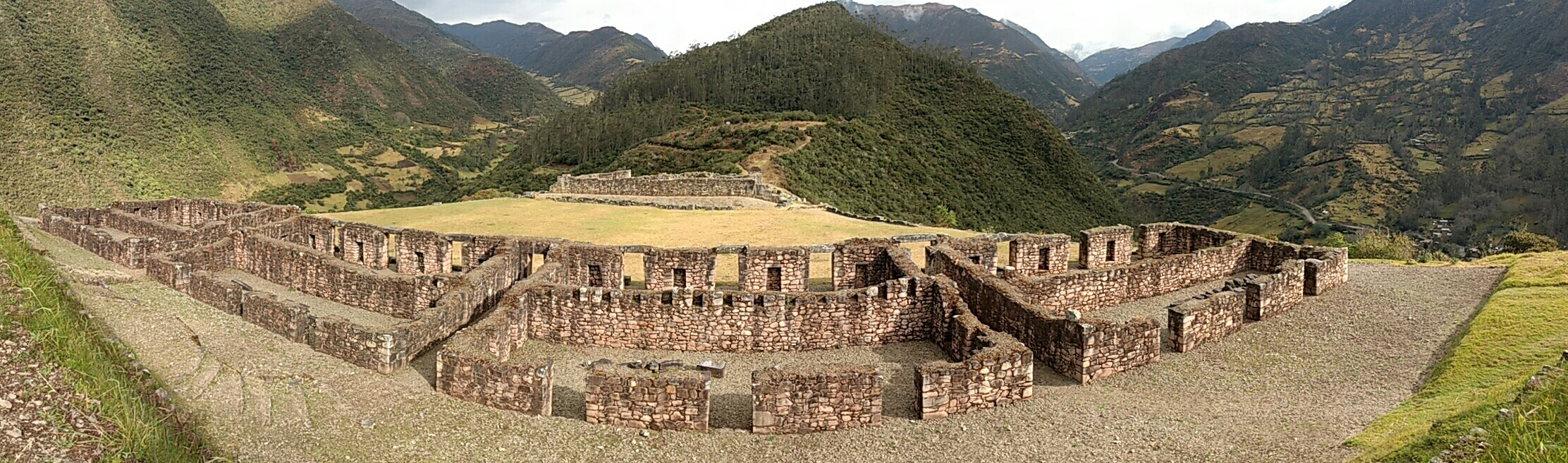

== Rediscovery ==
The location of Vitcos was forgotten in the centuries following the conquest of the Incas. In his 1911 expedition Hiram Bingham III was searching for Vilcabamba, the last capital of the Incas. Following descriptions left by various conquistadors, he came upon a site called "Rosaspata" by local villagers. Through the same descriptions that had led him there, he was able to determine that he was in fact at the palace of Vitcos and oracle of Ñusta Hisp'ana, also called Chuqip'allta. After cursory mapping of both sites he continued on in search of the last city of the Inca. Knowing roughly where in relation to Vitcos he might find Vilcabamba, he continued on what he believed was, and actually was, the road to his goal, and he both rediscovered and correctly identified both Vitcos and Vilcabamba.

In the 1980s, Vincent Lee's work in the Vilcabamba led to his finding and description of more than thirty buildings and engineered structures on the eastern flank of the hill between Vitcos and Chuquipalta. Amongst these are kalankas (meeting houses), several qollqa (storehouses), and a large usnu (religious observation platform), as well as terraces and built-up trails.

== The Rosaspata ruin ==
Vitcos stands on the northern side of the hill between the modern villages Huancacalle and Pucyara, and is the principal portion of a complex that covers the entire hill and portions of the valleys to the south and east. South of the hill there is Ñusta Hispana, also called Chuqip'allta and the White Rock, a giant carved stone said to have been an Inca oracle, and a series of terraces that stretch along the eastern side of the hill within the valley, which are believed to have been decorative or ceremonial gardens.

The palace itself consists of two groups of buildings. The upper group is made up of eight large rooms, arranged in four pairs of two rooms back to back, all joined by a common outer wall. The common wall has doors that lead to passages between the pairs. Each room has three doors to the exterior of the common wall, but no doors to either the room behind it of the passageways between the four pairs. Each pair of rooms had a common roof.

To the north of the upper group is a terrace wall, below which is the lower group of buildings. This group is made up of a dozen or more buildings arranged around an open courtyard. The exact number of buildings in this group is unclear, as it is in considerably worse condition than the upper group.

Bingham measured the royal residence as being 245 feet long by 43 feet wide, and stated, "There were no windows, but it was lighted by thirty doorways, fifteen in front and the same in back." He went on to say, "It contained ten large rooms, besides three hallways running from front to rear." The lintels were made of solid block of white granite. Opposite the long palace, Bingham measured a structure 78 feet long and 25 feet wide, "containing doors on both sides, no niches, and no evidence of careful workmanship."
