= Pucapuca (Peru) =

Mountain in Peru

- Location within Peru

Highest point
- Elevation: 5,450 m (17,880 ft)
- Coordinates: 13°15′04″S 72°51′40″W

Geography
- Location: Peru, Cusco Region
- Parent range: Andes, Vilcabamba

Pucapuca (possibly from Quechua puka red, the reduplication indicates that there is a group or a complex of something, "a complex of red color") is a 5,450-metre-high (17,881 ft) mountain in the Vilcabamba mountain range in the Andes of Peru. It is situated in the Cusco Region, La Convención Province, Santa Teresa District. Pucapuca lies southwest of Choquetacarpo and west of Pumasillo.
