= Vilcabamba District, La Convención =

Coordinates: 13.064°S 72.934°W

Vilcabamba Willkapampa
- District
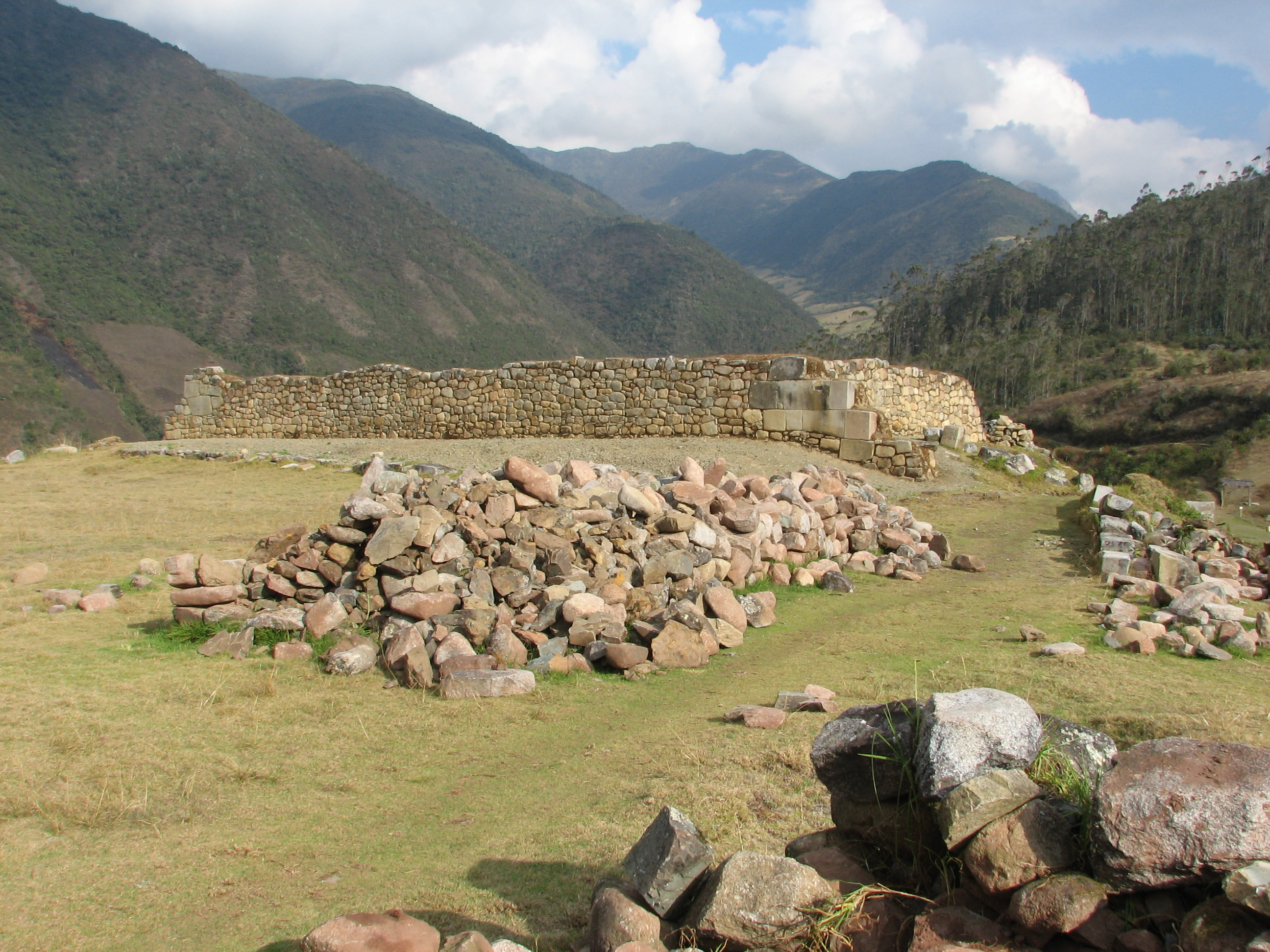
- The archaeological site of Vitcos (Rosaspata), Vilcabamba District
- Interactive map of Vilcabamba; Willkapampa
- Country: Peru
- Region: Cusco
- Province: La Convención
- Founded: January 2, 1857
- Capital: Centro Poblado Lucma

Government
  - Mayor: Justo Condori Luque (2019-2022)

Area
  - Total: 5,046.47 km^{2} (1,948.45 sq mi)
- Elevation: 2,943 m (9,656 ft)

Population (2017)
  - Total: 9,557
  - Density: 1.894/km^{2} (4.905/sq mi)
- Time zone: UTC-5 (PET)
- UBIGEO: 080909

Vilcabamba District is one of fourteen districts of the La Convención Province in the Cusco Region in Peru. The capital of the province is the Centro Poblado Lucma, which has an elevation of 2,943 metres (9,656 ft). Vitcos was an important city of the Neo-Inca State (1537-1572). Its ruins are now preserved as Rosaspata and Nusta Hisp'ana (the "White Rock").

The capital of the Neo-Inca state, also called Vilcabamba, is located in neighboring Echarate District. Its ruins are also known as Espiritu Pampa.

== Geography ==
The Willkapampa mountain range traverses the district. Some of the highest peaks of the district are listed below: Most of the peaks listed rise to more than 5,000 metres (16,000 ft) elevation above sea level.

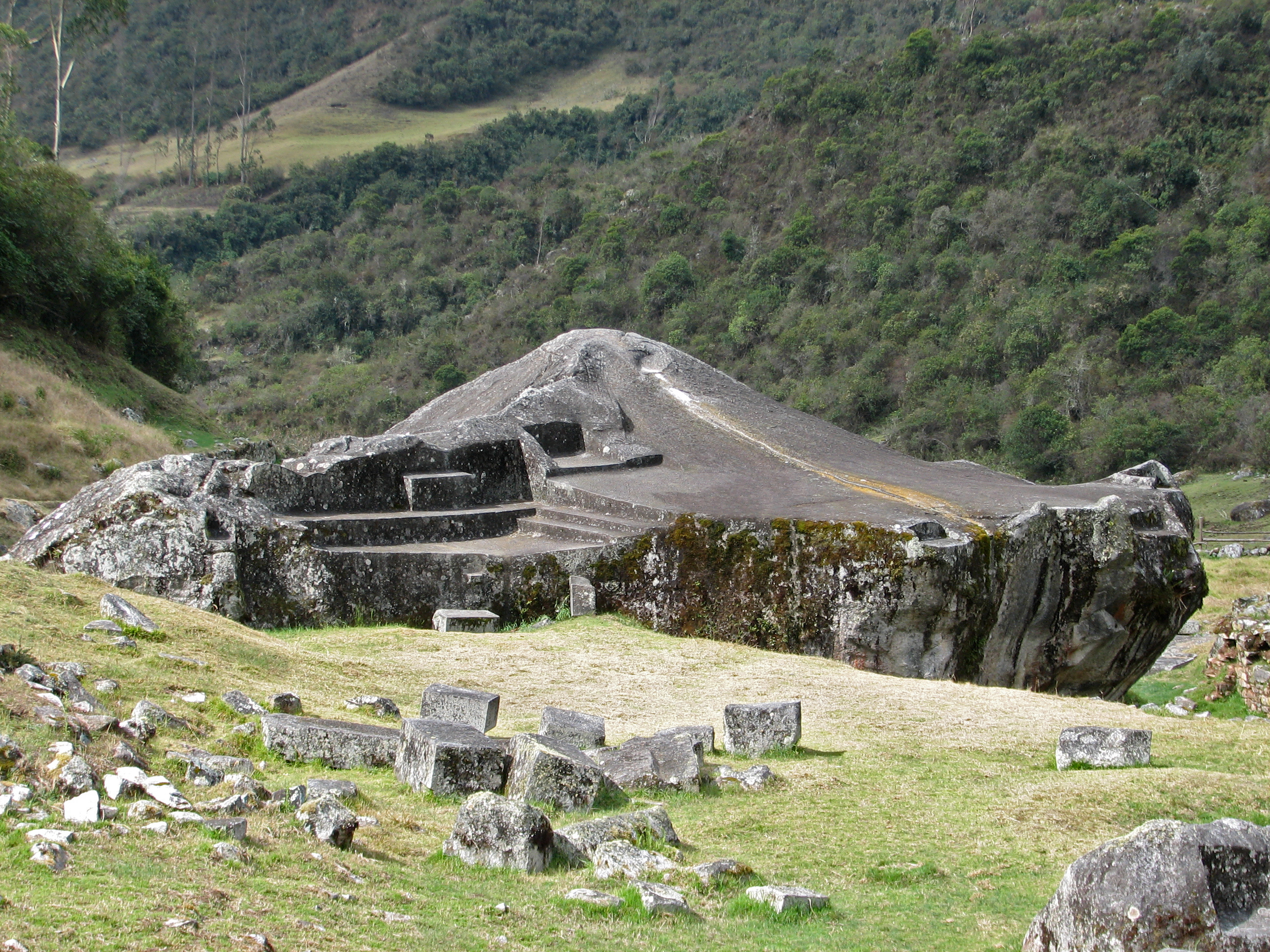
Nusta Hisp'ana, the White Rock.

- Asulqucha
- Chawpimayu
- Chuchaw Q'asa
- Chuqisapra
- Chuqitakarpu
- Hatun Wamanripa
- Kima
- Kinwa Urqu
- Mantur Q'asa
- Ñañu Wayq'u
- P'anta
- Qayqu
- Qayqu (near Pumasillu)
- Quriwayrachina
- Quysupakana
- Sut'uq Mach'ay
- Suyruqucha
- Utt'aña

The Apurímac River is the natural border between the Vilcabamba District and the Ayacucho Region. Within the district it receives waters from Hatun Wayq'u.

== Ethnic groups ==
The people in the district are mainly indigenous citizens of Quechua descent. Quechua is the language which the majority of the population (64.81%) learnt to speak in childhood, 34.53% of the residents started speaking using the Spanish language (2007 Peru Census).

== See also ==
- Inka Tampu
- Quriwayrachina (archaeological site)
- Ñust'a Hisp'ana
- Vitcos
