= Choquesafra =

Mountain in Peru

- Location within Peru

Highest point
- Elevation: 5,152 m (16,903 ft)
- Coordinates: 13°13′34″S 73°12′49″W

Geography
- Location: Cusco, Peru
- Parent range: Andes, Vilcabamba

Climbing
- First ascent: 1968

Choquesafra or Choquezafra (possibly from Quechua chuqi metal, every kind of precious metal / gold (<Aymara), sapra beard) is a 5,152-metre-high (16,903 ft) mountain in the Vilcabamba mountain range in the Andes of Peru. It is located in the Cusco Region, La Convención Province, on the border of the districts of Inkawasi and Vilcabamba. Choquesafra lies west of the Panta group and south of a river named Rancahuayco. The Huajchay River originates northwest of the mountain. It flows to the southwest as a right affluent of the Apurímac River.

== See also ==
- Choquetacarpo
- Padreyoc
