= Soray (mountain) =

Mountain in Peru

- Location within Peru

Highest point
- Elevation: 5,428 m (17,808 ft)
- Coordinates: 13°23′54″S 72°36′28″W

Geography
- Location: Cusco, Peru
- Parent range: Andes, Vilcabamba

Soray is a 5,428 metres (17,808 ft) mountain in the Vilcabamba Range in the Andes of Peru. It is located in the province of Anta, in the region of Cusco.
