= Amparay =

Mountain in Peru

- Location within Peru

Highest point
- Elevation: 5,418 m (17,776 ft)
- Coordinates: 13°24′12″S 72°40′05″W

Geography
- Location: Cusco, Peru
- Parent range: Andes, Vilcabamba

Amparay is a 5,418-metre (17,776 ft) mountain in the Vilcabamba Range in the Andes of Peru. It is located in the region of Cusco.
