= Peter Frost =

British writer, photographer and archaeologist

Peter Frost is a British writer, photographer, and archaeologist. He spent much of his time exploring Peru and wrote several books about the country. While leading a National Geographic expedition, Frost discovered the pre-Inca site of Qoriwayrachina. In 1977 Frost was one of the founding members of South American Explorers, a nonprofit travel, scientific and educational organization.

== Books ==
- The Pocket Guide to Ecuador
- The Pocket Guide to Peru
- 1995: Machu Picchu Historical Sanctuary
- 1979: Exploring Cusco
