= Paljay =

Mountain in Peru

- Location within Peru

Highest point
- Elevation: 5,422 m (17,789 ft)
- Coordinates: 13°17′09″S 72°30′20″W

Geography
- Location: Cusco, Peru
- Parent range: Andes, Vilcabamba

Paljay or Palcay is a 5,422 metres (17,789 ft) mountain in the Vilcabamba Range in the Andes of Peru. It is located in the region of Cusco.
