= Ocobamba District, La Convención =

District in Cusco, Peru

Coordinates: 12.8709°S 72.4472°W

Ocobamba District
- District
- Interactive map of Ocobamba District
- Country: Peru
- Region: Cusco
- Province: La Convención
- Founded: January 2, 1857
- Capital: Ocobamba

Government
  - Mayor: Gladys Montalvo Paucar

Area
  - Total: 840.93 km^{2} (324.68 sq mi)
- Elevation: 1,550 m (5,090 ft)

Population (2005 census)
  - Total: 5,936
  - Density: 7.059/km^{2} (18.28/sq mi)
- Time zone: UTC-5 (PET)
- UBIGEO: 080905

Ocobamba District is one of ten districts of the province La Convención in Peru.

== Ethnic groups ==
The people in the district are mainly indigenous citizens of Quechua descent. Quechua is the language which the majority of the population (69.30%) learnt to speak in childhood, 30.16% of the residents started speaking using the Spanish language (2007 Peru Census).

== See also ==
- Llawlliyuq
- Punkuyuq
