= Ñusta Hispana =

Archaeological site in Peru

- Ñusta Ispanan, Chuquipalta
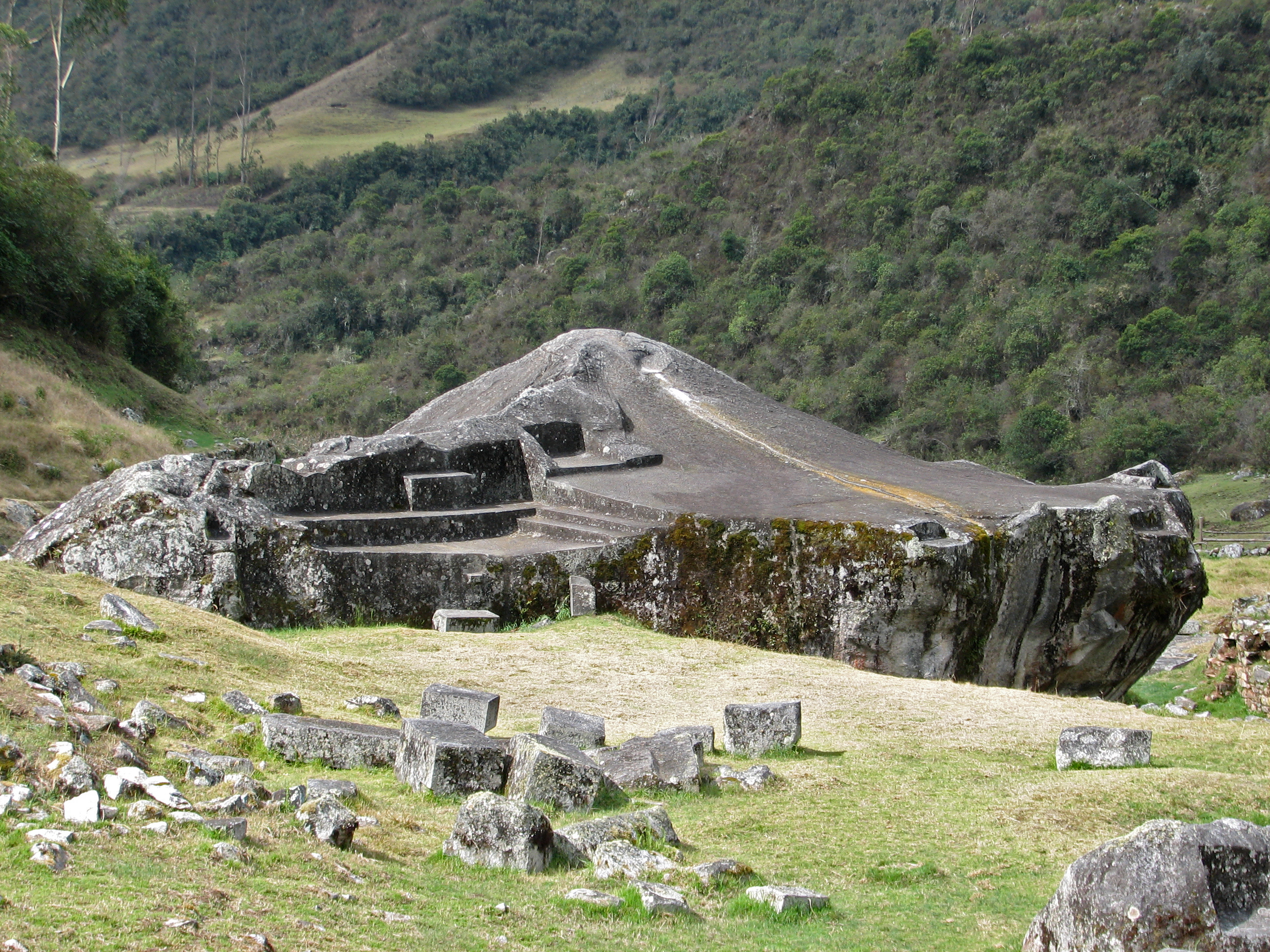
- Yurac Rumi ("white stone") at Ñusta Hispana

- Location within Peru
- 13°6′42″S 72°55′27″W
- Type: Settlement
- Cultures: Inca
- Location: Vilcabamba, Cusco Region

Ñusta Hispana Ñusta Ispanan (also written Ñusta Ispana), previously known as Chuquipalta (possibly from Quechua chuqi precious metal, p'allta plane) is an archaeological site in Peru. It is located at Vilcabamba, La Convención Province, Cusco Region.

A carved rock on the site is known as Yurac Rumi (White Rock).

Hiram Bingham III discovered the site on 9 August 1911. Bingham noted that the Augustinian monks Friar Marcos and Friar Diego, led their converted natives in burning down the Temple of the Sun, and scorching the rock itself, when Titu Cusi was absent.

== Images ==
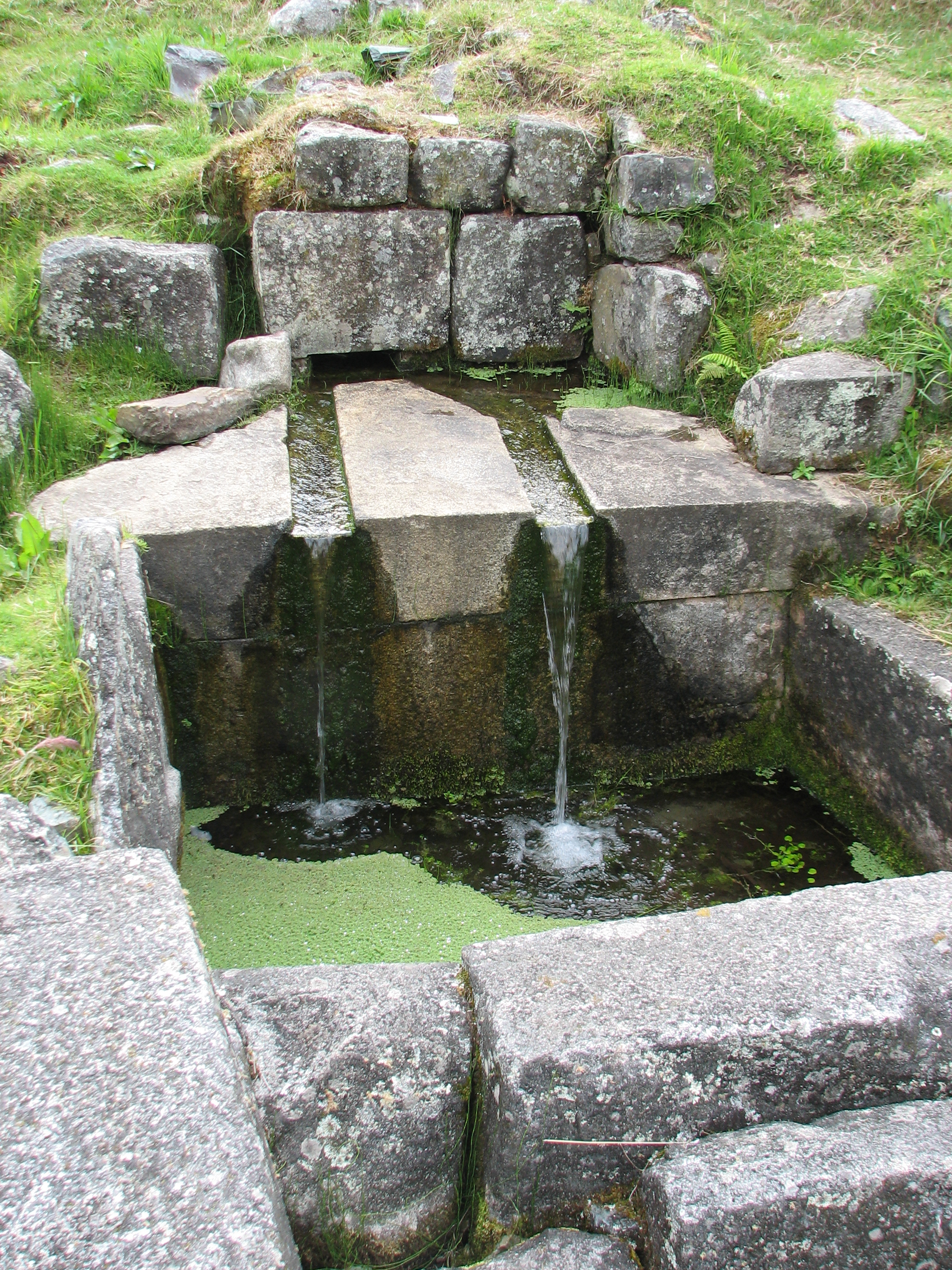
Bath at Ñusta Hispana

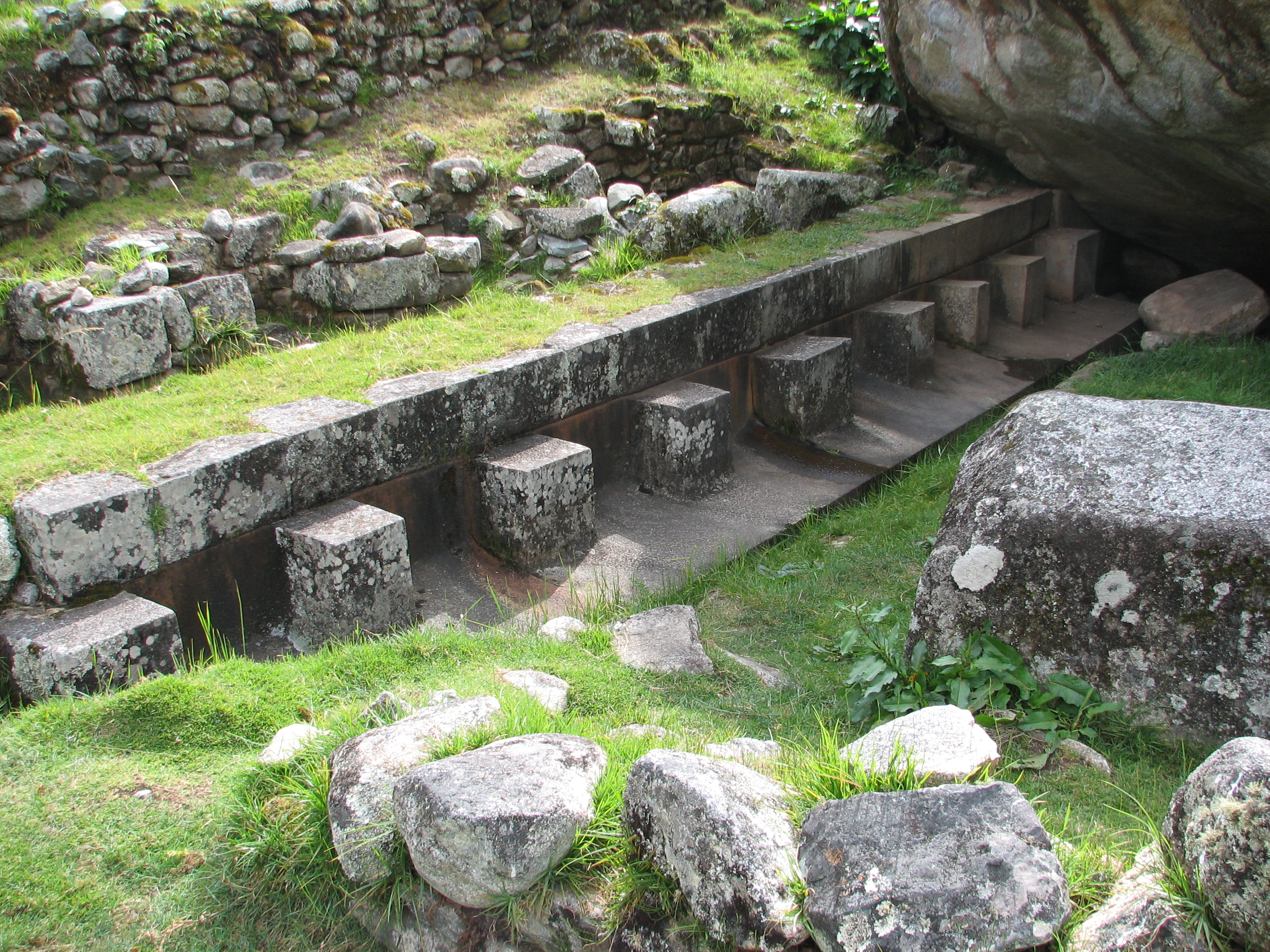
Nine seats beside Yurac Rumi

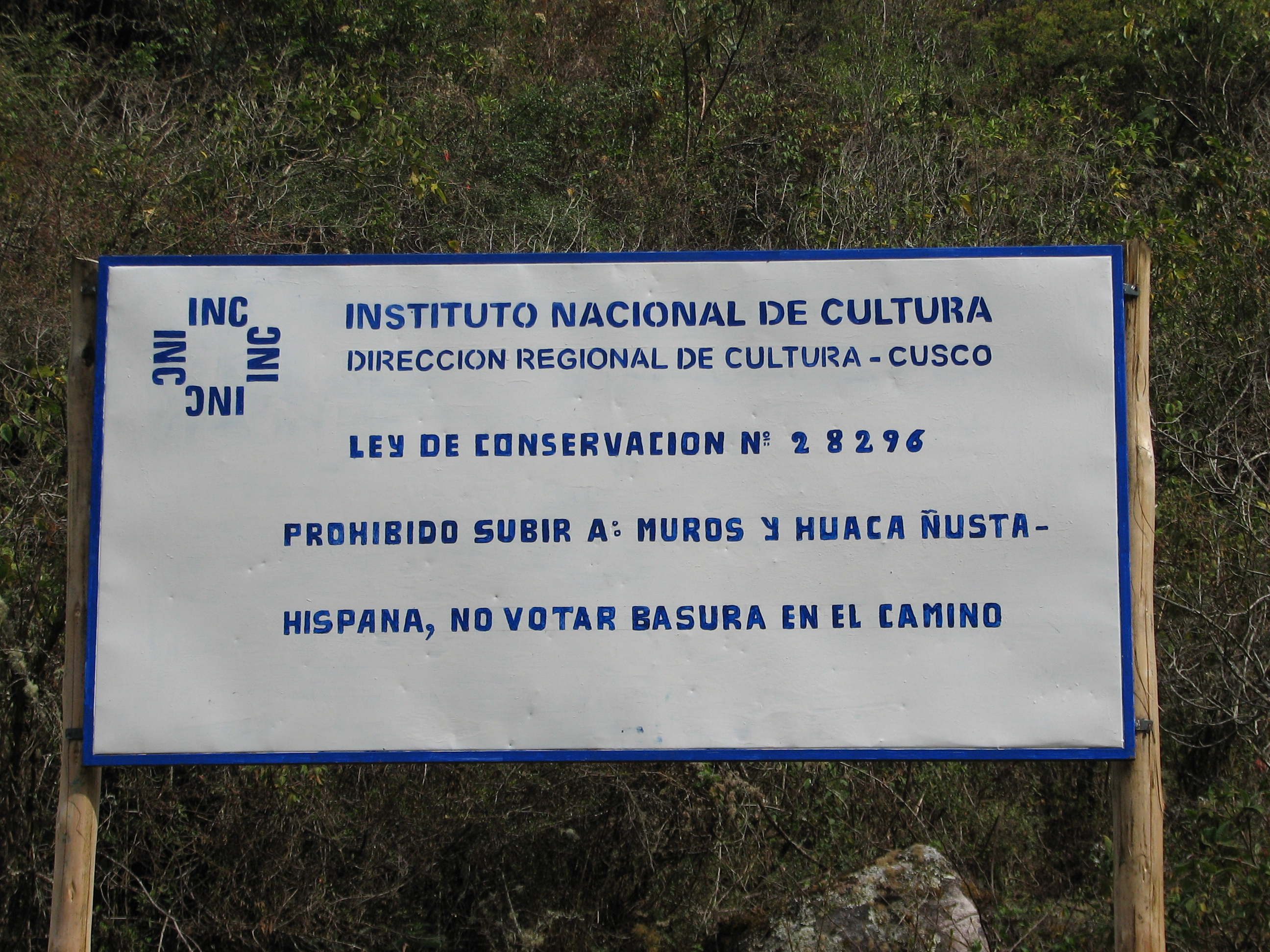
Sign at Ñusta Hispana

== See also ==
- Vitcos
