= Tucarhuay =

Mountain in Peru

- Location within Peru

Highest point
- Elevation: 5,910 m (19,390 ft)
- Coordinates: 13°21′43″S 72°35′17″W

Geography
- Location: Cusco, Peru
- Parent range: Andes, Vilcabamba

Tucarhuay is a 5,910 metres (19,390 ft) mountain in the Vilcabamba Range in the Andes of Peru. It is located in the region of Cusco.
