= Humantay =

Mountain in Peru

- Location within Peru

Highest point
- Elevation: 5,473 m (17,956 ft)
- Coordinates: 13°18′48″S 72°35′13″W

Geography
- Location: Cusco, Peru
- Parent range: Andes, Vilcabamba

Humantay is a 5,473 metres (17,956 ft) mountain in the Vilcabamba Range in the Andes of Peru. It is located in the region of Cusco.
