= Inka Tampu, Vilcabamba =

Archaeological site in Peru

Inka Tampu
- Interactive map of Inka Tampu
- Location: Peru
- Region: Cusco Region, La Convención Province, Vilcabamba District

Inka Tampu or Inkatampu (Quechua inka Inca, tampu inn, "Inca inn", Hispanicized and mixed spellings Incatambo, Inkatambo, Inca Tambo) is an archaeological site in Peru. It is located in the Cusco Region, La Convención Province, Vilcabamba District. The archaeological group is situated on top of a mountain named Inka Tampu (Inka Tambo).
