= Yanama =

Mountain in Peru

- Location within Peru

Highest point
- Elevation: 5,473 m (17,956 ft)
- Coordinates: 13°18′11″S 72°48′34″W

Geography
- Location: Cusco, Peru
- Parent range: Andes, Vilcabamba

Yanama is a 5,347 metres (17,543 ft) mountain in the Vilcabamba Range in the Andes of Peru. It is located in the region of Cusco.
