= Quellouno District =

Coordinates: 12.6263°S 72.6924°W

Quelloúno Q'illu Unu
- District
- Interactive map of Quelloúno
- Country: Peru
- Region: Cusco
- Province: La Convención
- Founded: October 1, 1986
- Capital: Quelloúno

Government
  - Mayor: Cleto Edwin Cabrera Cortes

Area
  - Total: 799.68 km^{2} (308.76 sq mi)
- Elevation: 800 m (2,600 ft)

Population (2005 census)
  - Total: 16,469
  - Density: 20.594/km^{2} (53.339/sq mi)
- Time zone: UTC-5 (PET)
- UBIGEO: 080906

Quelloúno (hispanicized spelling from Quechua Q'illu Unu, q'illu meaning yellow and unu meaning water, "yellow water") is one of ten districts of the La Convención Province in the Cusco Region in Peru.

== Ethnic groups ==
The people in the district are mainly indigenous citizens of Quechua descent. Quechua is the language which the majority of the population (50.98%) learnt to speak in childhood, 45.76% of the residents started speaking using the Spanish language (2007 Peru Census).
