= Llaulliyoc =

Mountain in Peru

- Location within Peru

Highest point
- Elevation: 4,400 m (14,400 ft)
- Coordinates: 13°06′22″S 72°17′23″W

Geography
- Location: Peru, Cusco Region
- Parent range: Andes

Llaulliyoc (possibly from Quechua llawlli Barnadesia horrida, -yuq a suffix, "the one with the llawlli") is a mountain north of the Urubamba mountain range in the Andes of Peru, about 4,400 m (14,400 ft) high. It is located in the Cusco Region, La Convención Province, Ocobamba District, and in the Urubamba Province, Ollantaytambo District.
