= La Convención province =

La Convención
- Province
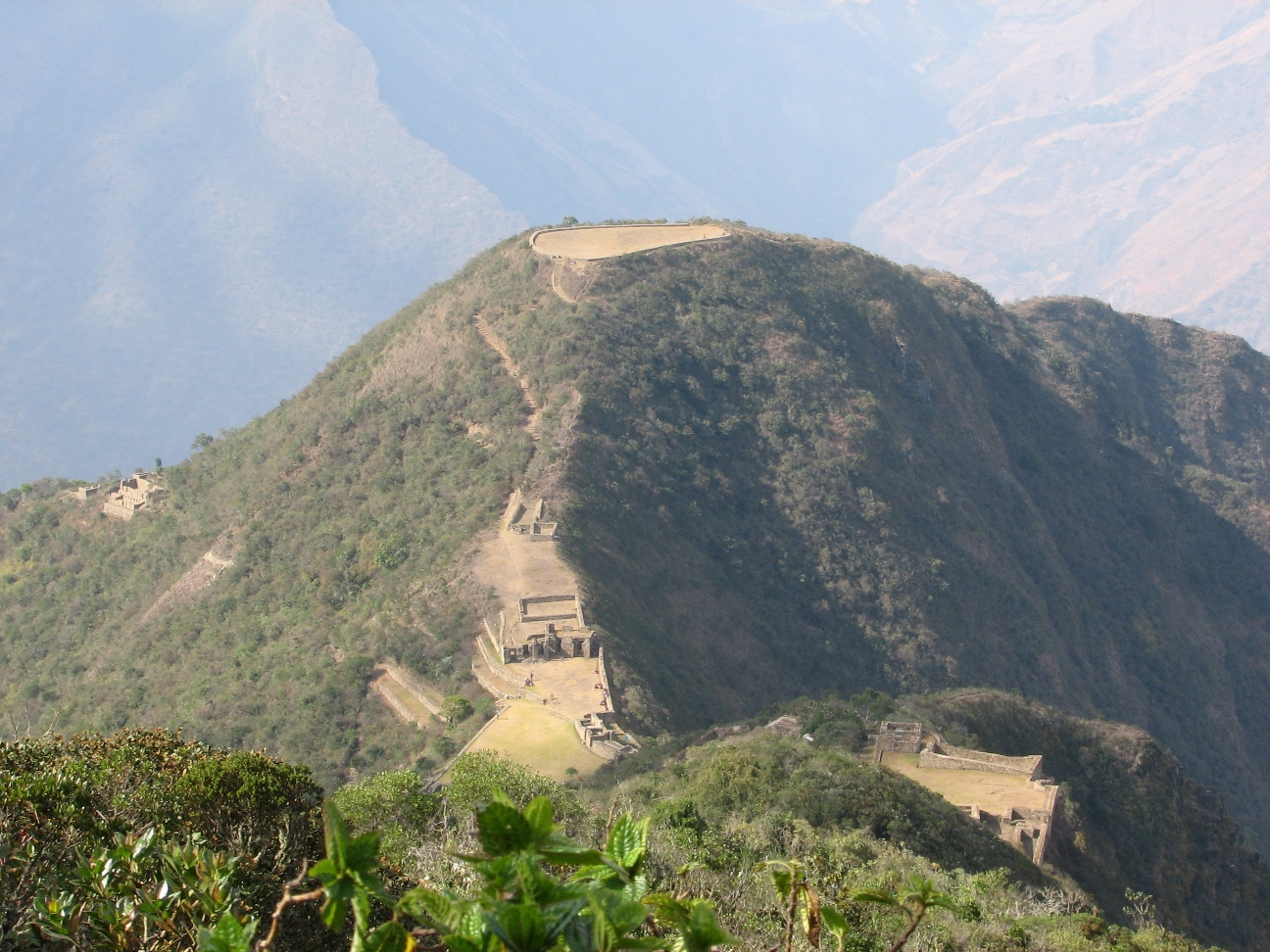
- Choquequirao, an Inca ruin.

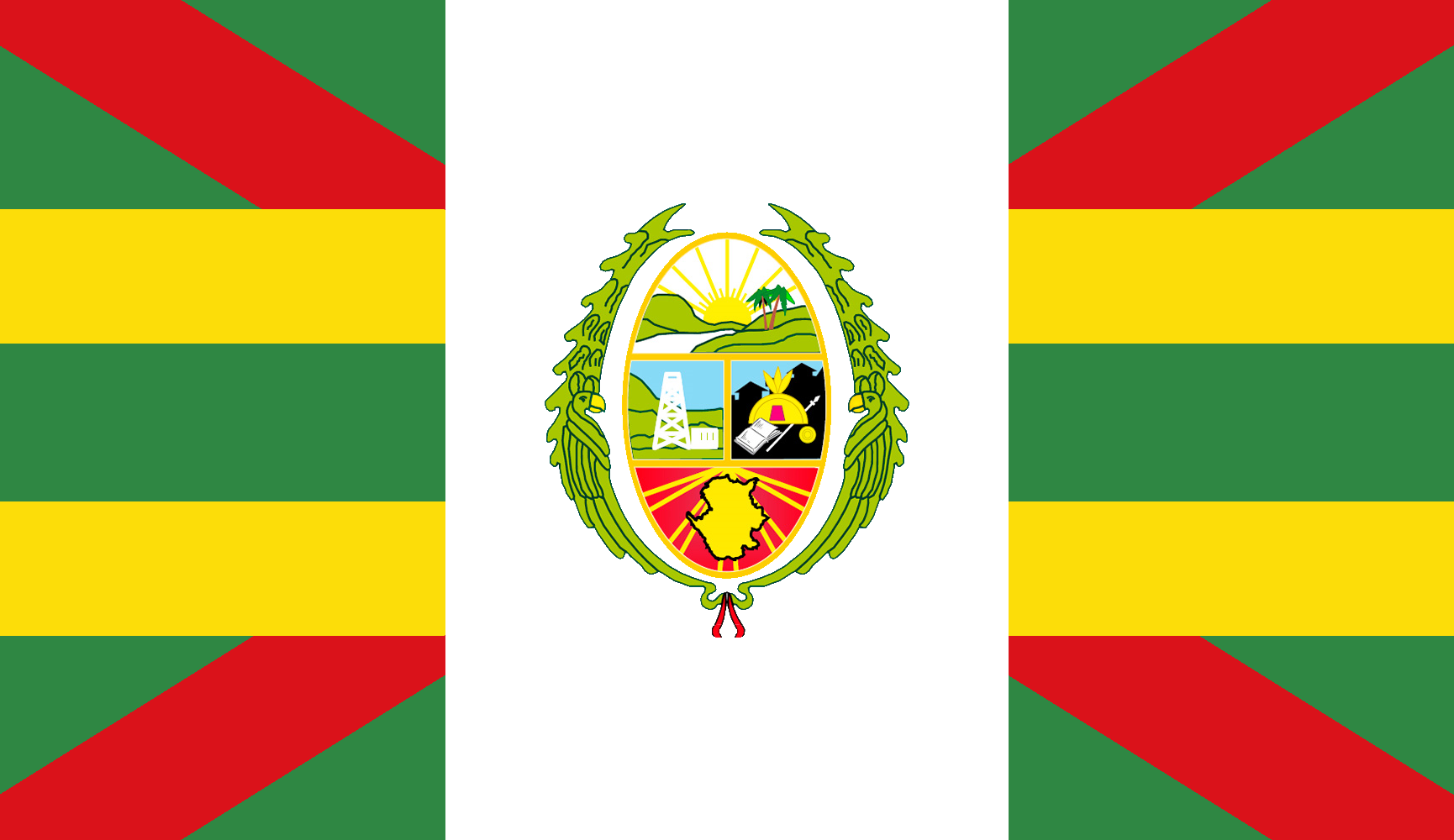
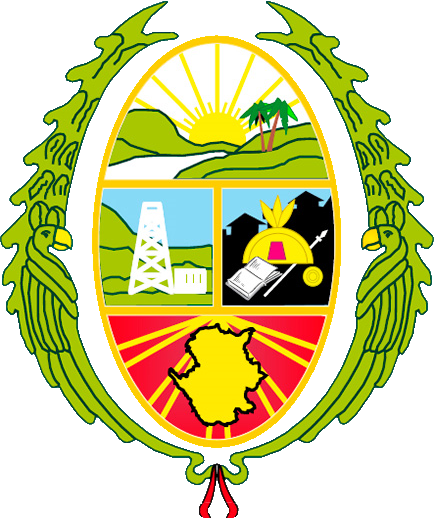
- Flag Coat of arms

- Location of La Convención in the Cusco Region
- Country: Peru
- Region: Cusco
- Capital: Quillabamba

Government
  - Mayor: Hernán De La Torre Dueñas (2019-2022)

Area
  - Total: 30,061.82 km^{2} (11,606.93 sq mi)

Population
  - Total: 147,148
  - Density: 4.89485/km^{2} (12.6776/sq mi)
- UBIGEO: 0809
- Website: https://www.gob.pe/munilaconvencion

La Convención is the largest of thirteen provinces in the Cusco Region in the southern highlands of Peru.

As part of the higher-altitude Amazon basin at the foot of the Andes, La Convención is one of three Peruvian provinces that prominently figure in national coffee production, the other being Chanchamayo province in Junín and Jaén province in Cajamarca.

== Geography ==
The province of La Convención is bounded to the north by the Junín Region and the Ucayali Region, to the east by the Madre de Dios Region, to the south by the provinces of Anta, Calca and Urubamba, and to the west by the Ayacucho Region and the Apurímac Region.

La Convención is approximately 220 km (140 mi) long from north to south. Within that distance, the land of La Convención reaches has a maximum elevation of 6,264 m (20,551 ft) at Salcantay, on the border of La Convención, Anta, and Urubamba provinces, and a minimum elevation of 284 m (932 ft) in the Amazon Basin along the Ucayali River. Between the glaciers and tundra of Salcantay and other high mountains to the rain forests of the Amazon Basin the topography is extremely rugged and varied.

The Urupampa and Willkapampa mountain ranges traverse the province. Some of the highest peaks of the province are listed below:

- Asulqucha
- Chawpi Urqu
- Chawpimayu
- Chuchaw Q'asa
- Chuqisapra
- Chuqitakarpu
- Hatun Wamanripa
- Inka Tampu Urqu
- Kima
- Kinwa Urqu
- Kiswar
- Kuntur Sinqa
- K'urkur Urqu
- Lanranniyuq
- Llawlliyuq
- Mantur Q'asa
- Marquni
- Ñañu Wayq'u
- Puka Puka
- Pumasillu
- Pumasillu (near Pumasilluqucha)
- Punkuyuq
- Putukuyuq
- Phaqcha
- P'anta
- Qayqu
- Qayqu (near Pumasillu)
- Qillwaqucha
- Quchapata
- Quriwayrachina
- Quysupakana
- Salcantay
- Sara Sarayuq
- Sut'uq Mach'ay
- Suyruqucha
- Tunki Urqu
- Uqhupampa
- Uru Saywa
- Waqay Willka
- Wayllayuq
- Willka Wiqi
- Wiraquchasi
- Yana Urqu
- Yanaqucha
- Yanantin
- Yuraqmayu

== Political divisions ==
The province is divided into fourteen districts (Spanish: distritos, singular: distrito), each of which is headed by a mayor (alcalde). The districts are:

Districts of La Convención
District	Capital	Area	Population (2017)	elevation (of capital)	coordinates	Notes
Echarate	Echarate	21,284 km^{2} (8,218 sq mi)	23,214	1,326 m (4,350 ft)	12.768°S 72.577°W	
Huayopata	Huyro	530 km^{2} (200 sq mi)	4,773	1,559 m (5,115 ft)	13.007°S 72.554°W	
Inkawasi	Amaybamba	773 km^{2} (298 sq mi)	4,285	1,768 m (5,801 ft)	13.289°S 73.265°W	Created 2014 from Vilcabamba
Kimbiri District	Kimbiri	788 km^{2} (304 sq mi)	15,962	739 m (2,425 ft)	12.620°S 73.789°W	
Maranura District	Maranura	165 km^{2} (64 sq mi)	4,134	1,110 m (3,640 ft)	12.964°S 72.664°W	
Megantoni	Camisea	10,708 km^{2} (4,134 sq mi)	6,969	303 m (994 ft)	11.450°S 73.034°W	Created 2016 from Echarate
Ocobamba	Ocobamba	863 km^{2} (333 sq mi)	4,327	1,543 m (5,062 ft)	12.871°S 72.447°W	
Pichari District	Pichari	813 km^{2} (314 sq mi)	22,961	614 m (2,014 ft)	12.520°S 73.830°W	
Quelloúno	Quellouno	1,965 km^{2} (759 sq mi)	13,311	800 m (2,600 ft)	12.637°S 72.557°E	
Santa Ana	Quillabamba	392 km^{2} (151 sq mi)	27,999	1,063 m (3,488 ft)	12.868°S 72.692°W	
Santa Teresa	Santa Teresa	1,329 km^{2} (513 sq mi)	5,972	1,811 m (5,942 ft)	13.120°S 72.594°W	
Vilcabamba	Lukma	2,329 km^{2} (899 sq mi)	9,557	2,764 m (9,068 ft)	13.063°S 72.933°W	
Villa Kintiarina	Villa Kintiarina	199 km^{2} (77 sq mi)	1,974	693 m (2,274 ft)	12.918°S 73.529°W	Created 2015 from Kimbiri
Villa Virgen	Villa Virgen	439 km^{2} (169 sq mi)	1,980	731 m (2,398 ft)	13.001°S 73.305°W	Created 2014 from Vilcabamba
Total: La Convención	Quillabamba	30,062 km^{2} (11,607 sq mi)	147,148			

Note: The Peruvian government estimates an underenumeration nationwide in the 2017 census of about 6 percent.

== Ethnic groups ==
The province is inhabited by indigenous citizens: Asháninka, Matsigenka, Yine and Quechua. Spanish is the language which the majority of the population (51.98%) learnt to speak in childhood, 39.82% of the residents started speaking using the Quechua language (2007 Peru Census).

== See also ==
- Administrative divisions of Peru

- Chukchu
- Chuqik'iraw
- Inka Tampu, Huayopata
- Inka Tampu, Vilcabamba
- Llaqtapata
- Luq'umayu
- Machiguenga Communal Reserve
- Megantoni National Sanctuary
- Ñust'a Hisp'ana
- Otishi National Park
- Quchapata
- Quriwayrachina (archaeological site)
- Wamanmarka
