= Soirococha (Cusco) =

Mountain in Peru

- Location within Peru

Highest point
- Elevation: 5,297 m (17,379 ft)
- Coordinates: 13°12′33″S 73°03′28″W

Naming
- Language of name: Quechua

Geography
- Location: Peru, Cusco Region
- Parent range: Andes, Vilcabamba

Soirococha (possibly from Quechua suyru a very long dress tracked after when worn, qucha lake,) is a 5,297-metre-high (17,379 ft) mountain at a lake of that name in the Vilcabamba mountain range in the Andes of Peru. It is located in the Cusco Region, La Convención Province, Vilcabamba District. Soirococha lies northeast of P'anta and Kima.

The mountain is named after a lake at 13°12′33″S 73°04′23″W.
