= Quriwayrachina, La Convención =

Archaeological site in Peru

Quriwayrachina
- Qoriwayrachina
- Location within Peru
- 13°20′30″S 72°53′19″W
- Cultures: Inca
- Location: Peru, Cusco Region, La Convención Province
- Region: Andes

A previously unknown Inca settlement, Quriwayrachina, Quri Wayrachina, or Qoriwayrachina (Quechua quri gold, wayrachina a special oven for smelting metal, "oven for smelting gold"), was found in the Willkapampa mountain range in the Cusco Region of Peru in 2001. The site lies in the Santa Teresa District of the La Convención Province, north of the archaeological site of Choquequirao and west of the mountains Kiswar and Quriwayrachina (Corihuayrachina), on a mountain named Victoria. Close to nearby ancient Inca mines, the surrounding hills are covered with the littered stones from more than 200 structures in this Inca outpost.

== Discovery ==
The British photographer and researcher Peter Frost discovered in 1999 a walking trail of the village. In June 2001 he led a group of archaeologists to the area. They found an area of 6 square kilometres of agricultural terraces, grain storage, cemeteries, grave towers, more than 100 circular buildings, the stump of a pyramid and an 8 km long canal, which was used for irrigation. The religious and administrative center was an open plaza, under which a tomb was located.

When the researchers arrived in Quriwayrachina, the city had been looted already. Skeletons were found in the graves but with no grave goods. The pottery and stone tools found were identified with two different time periods. Estimates place the origin of the outpost in the early 13th century, then abandoned, later to be resettled.
