= Azulcocha (Cusco) =

Mountain in Peru

- Location within Peru

Highest point
- Elevation: 5,269 m (17,287 ft)
- Coordinates: 13°13′25″S 73°06′55″W

Geography
- Location: Peru, Cusco Region
- Parent range: Andes, Vilcabamba

Azulcocha (possibly from Quechua asul blue (a borrowing from Spanish azul), qucha lake, "blue lake") is a 5,269-metre-high (17,287 ft) mountain in the Vilcabamba mountain range in the Andes of Peru. It is located in the Cusco Region, La Convención Province, on the border of the districts of Inkawasi and Vilcabamba. Azulcocha lies northwest of the Panta group. The Ranq'a Wayq'u (Rancahuayco) originates northwest of the mountain and its waters flow to the Apurímac River.
