= Chungui District =

Coordinates: 13.2213°S 73.6210°W

Chungui
- District
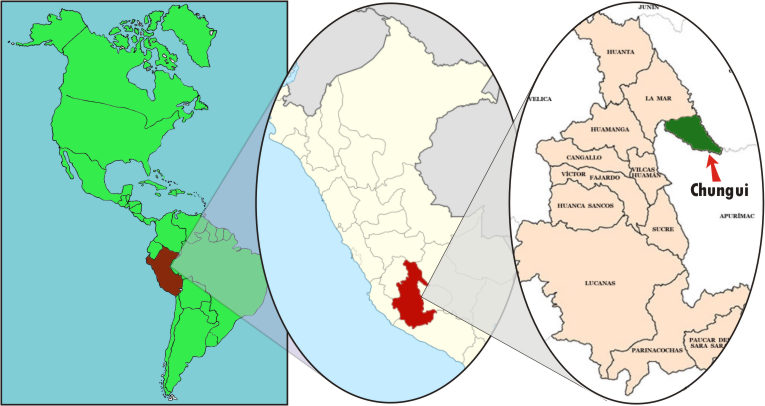
- Interactive map of Chungui
- Country: Peru
- Region: Ayacucho
- Province: La Mar
- Capital: Chungui

Government
  - Mayor: Elvin Ccaicuri Santi

Area
  - Total: 1,060.52 km^{2} (409.47 sq mi)
- Elevation: 3,499 m (11,480 ft)

Population (2005 census)
  - Total: 7,209
  - Density: 6.798/km^{2} (17.61/sq mi)
- Time zone: UTC-5 (PET)
- UBIGEO: 050505

Chungui District is one of eight districts of the province La Mar in Peru.

== Ethnic groups ==
The people in the district are mainly indigenous citizens of Quechua descent. Quechua is the language which the majority of the population (96.45%) learnt to speak in childhood, 2.73% of the residents started speaking using the Spanish language (2007 Peru Census).
