= Salcantay =

Mountain in Peru

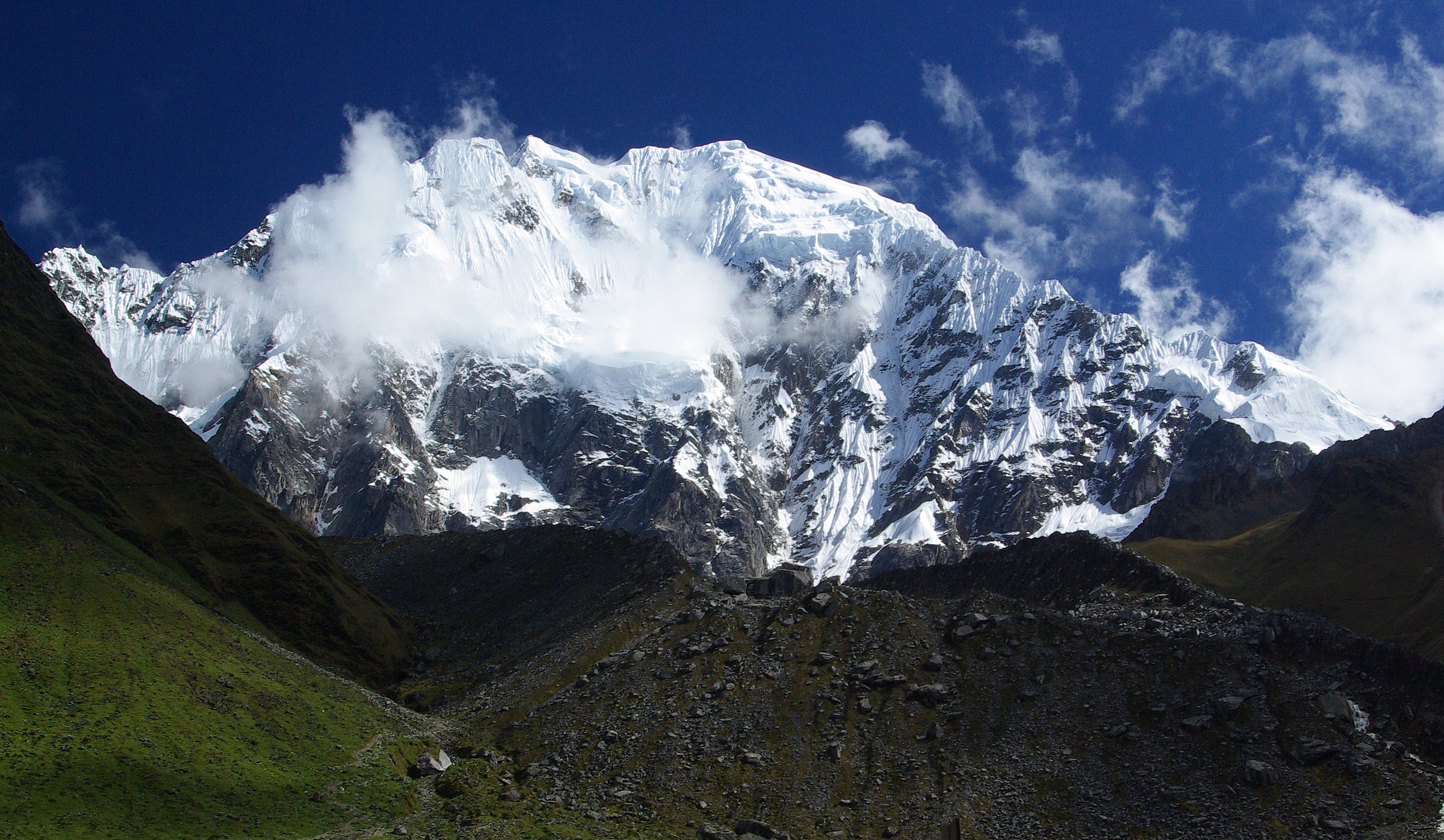
- View from the southwest.

Highest point
- Elevation: 6,271 m (20,574 ft) or 6,264 m (20,551 ft)
- Prominence: 2,540 metres (8,330 ft)
- Listing: Ultra
- Coordinates: 13°20′01″S 72°32′40″W

Geography
- Location within Peru
- Location: Cusco Region, Peru
- Parent range: Vilcabamba, Andes

Climbing
- First ascent: August 4, 1952, by Fred D. Ayres, David Michael Jr., W. V. Graham Matthews, George Irving Bell, Claude Kogan, M. Bernard Pierre
- Easiest route: Northeast ridge: technical glacier/snow/ice climb (French grade AD)

Salcantay, Salkantay or Sallqantay (in Quechua) is the highest peak in the Vilcabamba mountain range, part of the Peruvian Andes. It is in the Cusco Region, about 60 km (40 mi) west-northwest of the city of Cusco. It is the 38th-highest peak in the Andes and the 12th-highest in Peru. As a range highpoint in deeply incised terrain, it is the second-most topographically prominent peak in the country, after Huascarán.

Salcantay's proximity to Machu Picchu makes trekking around it an alternative to the oversubscribed Inca Trail; this is known as the Salkantay trek.

== History ==
The name Salkantay is from sallqa, a Quechua word meaning wild, uncivilized, savage, or invincible, and was recorded as early as 1583. The name is thus often translated as "Savage Mountain".

Directly north of Salkantay is Machu Picchu, at the end of a ridge that extends down from it. Viewed from Machu Picchu's main sundial, the Southern Cross is above Salkantay's summit when at its highest point in the sky during the rainy season. The Incas associated this alignment with rain and fertility, and considered Salkantay one of the principal deities controlling weather and fertility in the region west of Cusco.

== Mountaineering ==
Salcantay is a large, steep peak with great vertical relief, particularly above the low valleys to the north, which are tributaries of the Amazon River.

The standard route on the mountain is the Northeast ridge. Accessing the route typically involves three days of travel from Cusco. The climb involves about 1,800 m (5,900 ft) of vertical gain, on glaciers, snow, ice, and some rock.

=== Climbing history ===
Salcantay was first climbed in 1952 by a French-American expedition comprising Fred D. Ayres, David Michael Jr., John C. Oberlin, W. V. Graham Matthews, Austen F. Riggs, George Irving Bell, Claude Kogan, M. Bernard Pierre, and Jean Guillemin. All but Oberlin, Riggs, and Guillemin reached the summit. Two years later Fritz Kasparek fell through a cornice near the summit on the northeast ridge.

On June 17, 2013, Nathan Heald (USA), Thomas Ryan (USA), and Luis Crispin (Peru) made the summit at 10:30 am after nine hours of climbing from a high camp at 5,500 m. on the northeast ridge. This made Crispin the first Peruvian climber to summit the mountain. The team took a reading of 6,279 m, S 13° 20.027’, W 72° 32.596’, on a GPS device. On July 31, 2013, a second team led by Nathan Heald (USA), consisting of James Lissy (USA) and Edwin Espinoza Sotelo (Peru) made the summit by the northeast ridge, making Heald the only person to have summited the mountain twice. Due to glacial retreat, the route is now graded D on the French adjectival scale.

== Gallery ==
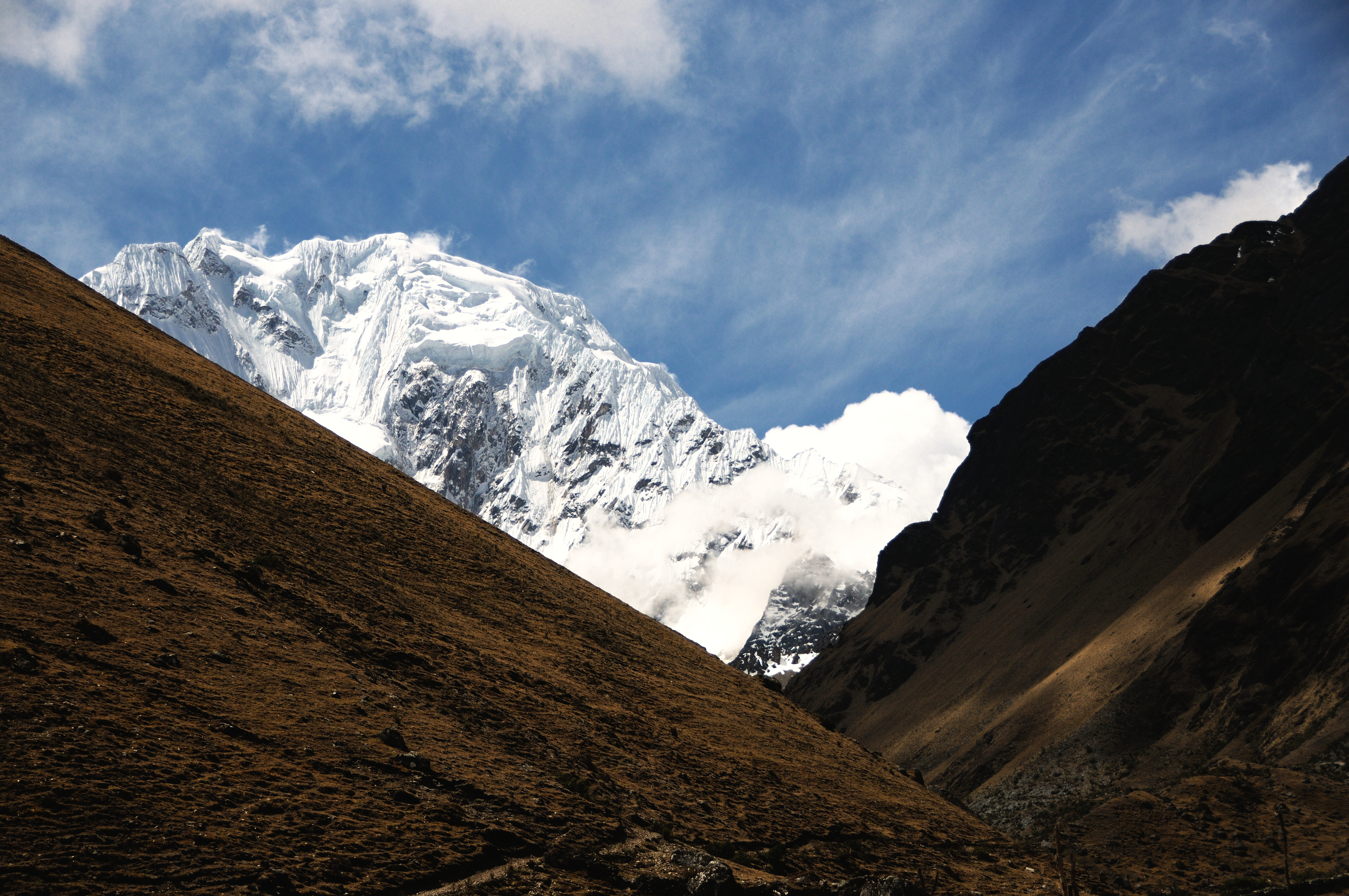
View from the Trek.

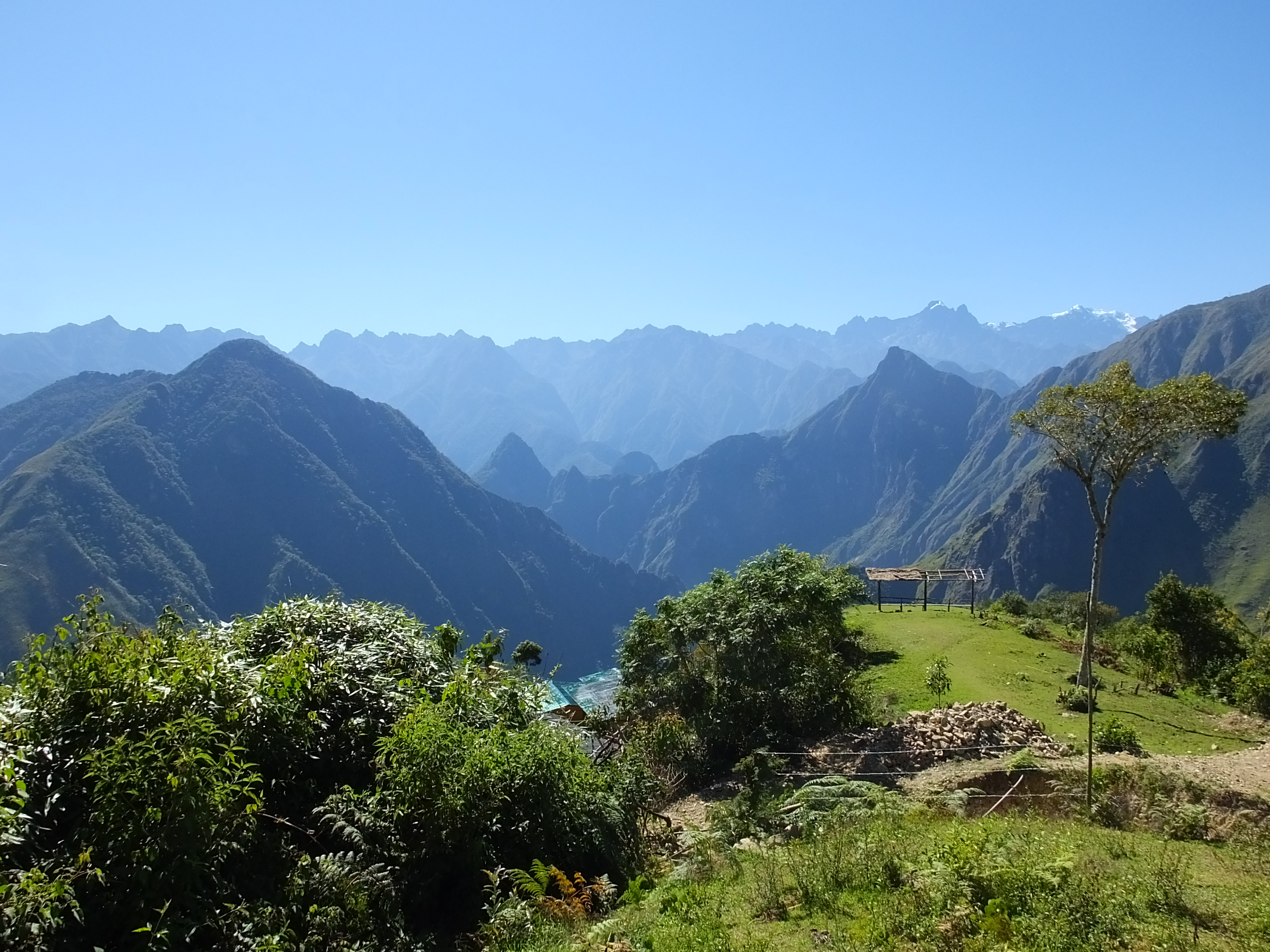
View of Machu Picchu from Salkantay Trek.

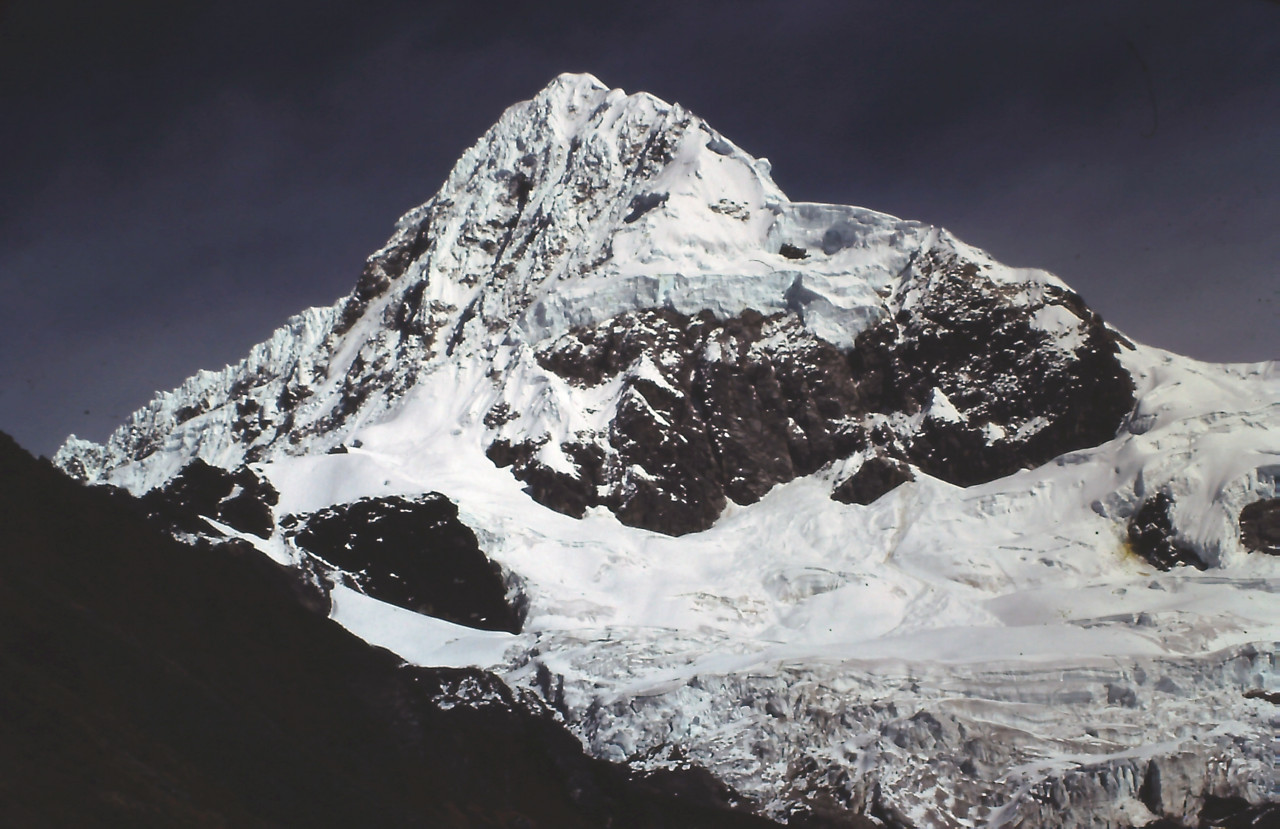
East face.

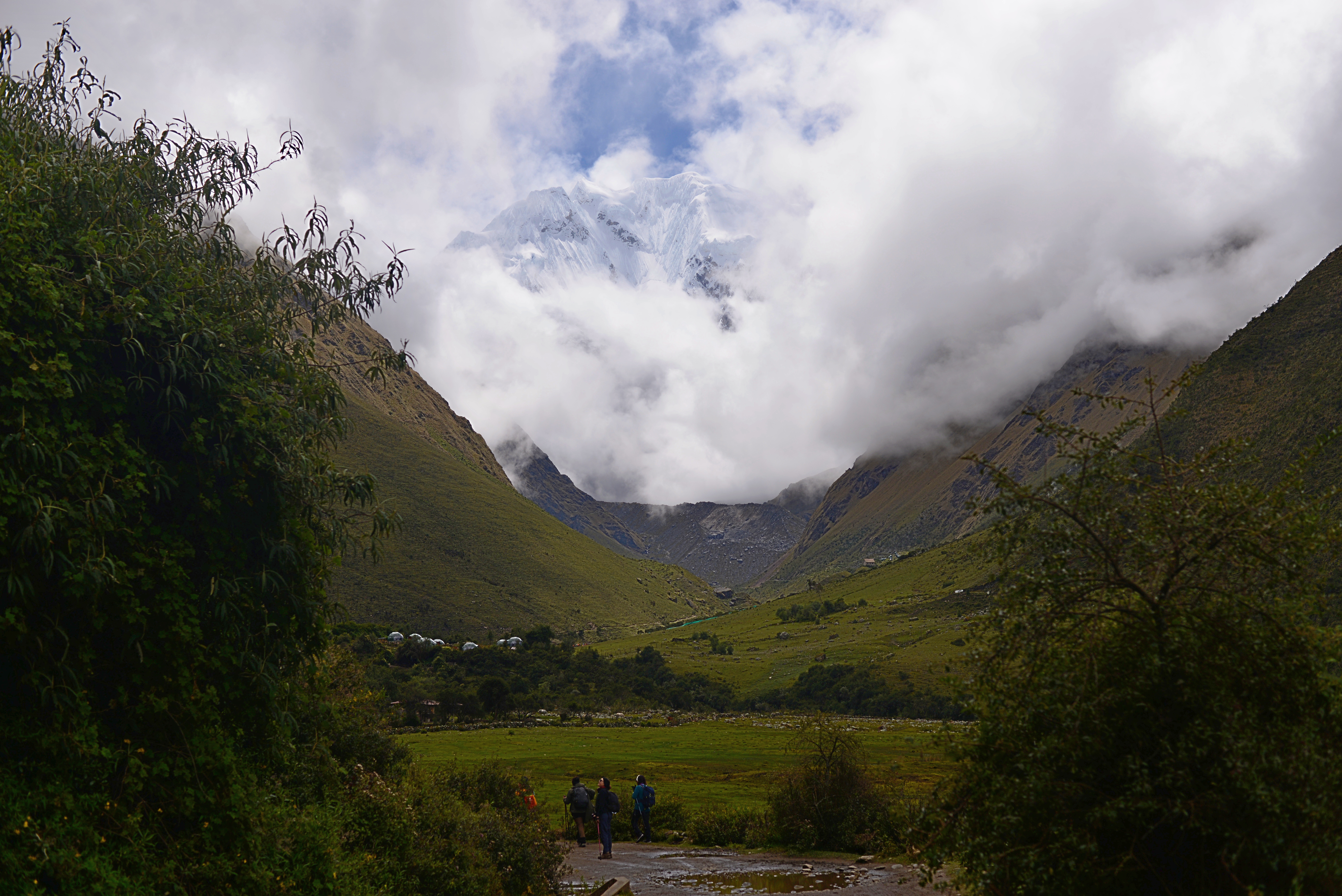
A cloud-covered Salcantay viewed from near Soraypampa.

Peak from Salcantay trek

== See also ==
- Padreyoc or Quishuar
- List of mountains in Peru, all peaks above 6,000 metres
