= Padreyoc (Cusco) =

Mountain in Peru

- Quishuar
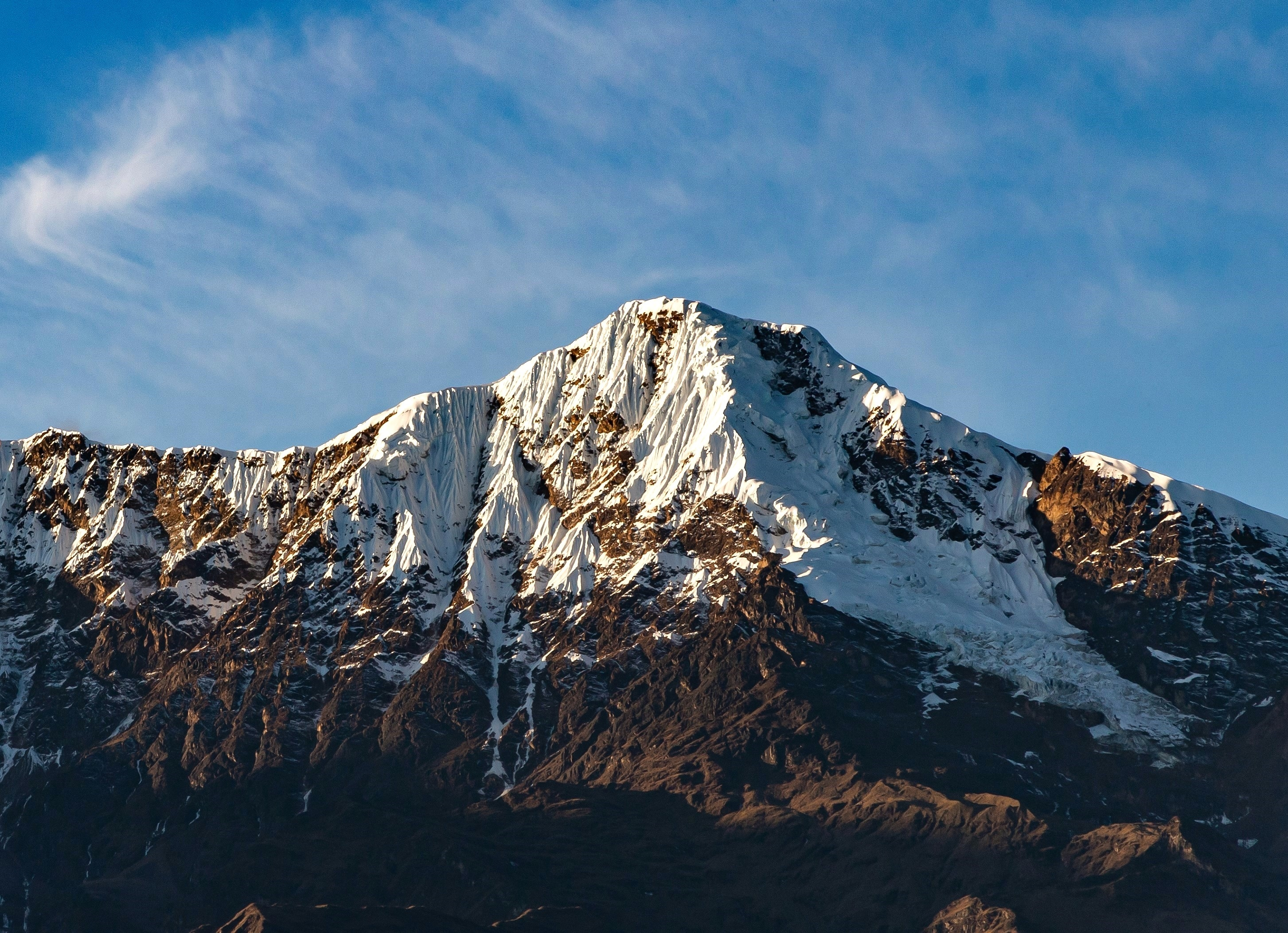
- Southwest aspect

Highest point
- Elevation: 5,771 m (18,934 ft)
- Prominence: 1,071 m (3,514 ft)
- Isolation: 13.36 km (8.30 mi)
- Coordinates: 13°22′42″S 72°44′23″W

Geography
- Location within Peru
- Location: Cusco, Peru
- Parent range: Andes, Vilcabamba

Padreyoc (Spanish con padre, tiene padre; with father, have father, possibly from Quechua -yuq a suffix to indicate possession) or Quishuar (possibly from Quechua Kiswar for buddleja incana) is a mountain in the Vilcabamba mountain range in the Andes of Peru, about 5,771 metres (18,934 ft) high. It is located in the Cusco Region, La Convención Province. Padreyoc lies south-west of the mountain Salcantay and east of the mountain Corihuayrachina.
