= Vilcabamba mountain range =

Mountain range in Peru

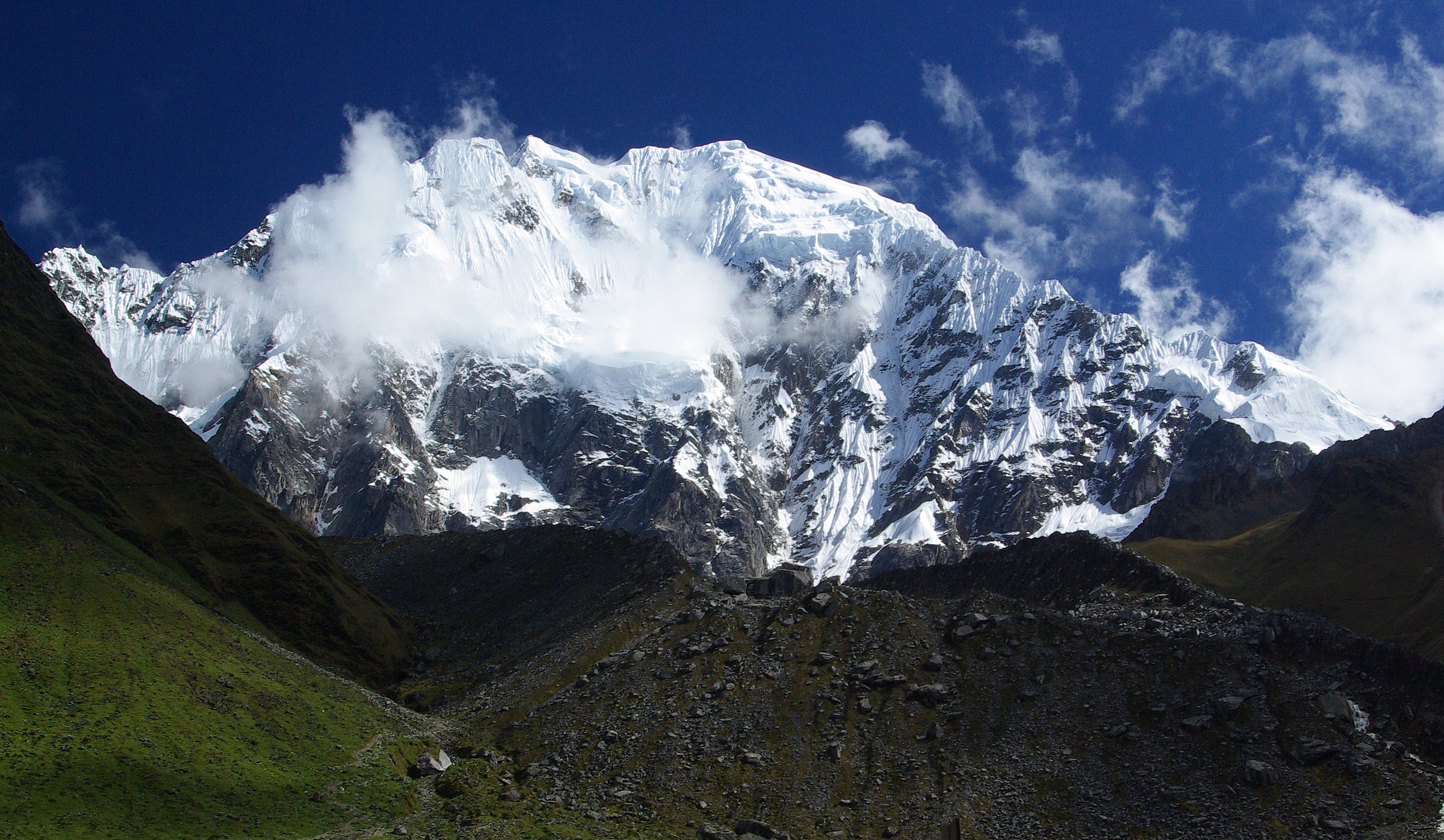
- Salcantay

Highest point
- Peak: Salcantay
- Elevation: 6,271 m (20,574 ft)

Dimensions
- Length: 85 km (53 mi) N-S

Naming
- Native name: Willka Pampa / Willkapampa (Aymara)

Geography
- Country: Peru
- Region: Cusco Region
- Parent range: Andes

The Vilcabamba mountain range is located in the region of Cusco, Peru, in the provinces of Anta, La Convención and Urubamba. It extends between 13°10' and 13°27'S. and 72°30' and 73°15'W for about 85 km. Its highest peak is Salcantay, which is 6,271 m (20,574 ft) above sea level.

== Toponyms ==
Most of the names in the range originate from Quechua. They used to be spelled according to a mainly Spanish-based orthography which is incompatible with the normalized spellings of these languages and Law 29735 which regulates the 'use, preservation, development, recovery, promotion and diffusion of the originary languages of Peru'. According to Article 20 of Decreto Supremo No 004-2016-MC (Supreme Decree) which approves the Regulations to Law 29735, published in the official newspaper El Peruano on July 22, 2016, adequate spellings of the toponyms in the normalized alphabets of the indigenous languages must progressively be proposed with the aim of standardizing the namings used by the IGN. The IGN realizes the necessary changes in the official maps of Peru.

Hints to wrong spellings are terms containing hua and hui (instead of wa and wi), "e", "o", "ca", "cu", "qu" or diphthongs among others.

== Etymology ==
The name Vilcabamba possibly comes from Aymara and Quechua willka: a species of tree, or a local God; and pampa: flat terrain, plain.

== Mountains ==
The highest peak in the range is Salcantay at 6,271 metres (20,574 ft). Other mountains are listed below:

- Pumasillo, 5,991 m (19,656 ft)
- Tucarhuay, 5,928 m (19,449 ft)
- Padreyoc, 5,771 m (18,934 ft)
- Panta, 5,667 m (18,593 ft)
- Choquetacarpo, 5,520 m (18,110 ft)
- Humantay 5,473 m (17,956 ft)
- Huayanay 5,464 m (17,927 ft)
- Pucapuca, 5,450 m (17,880 ft)
- Soray, 5,428 m (17,808 ft)
- Paljay, 5,422 m (17,789 ft)
- Amparay, 5,418 m (17,776 ft)
- Corihuayrachina, 5,404 m (17,730 ft)
- Yanama, 5,347 m (17,543 ft)
- Jatunjasa, 5,338 m (17,513 ft)
- Soirococha, 5,297 m (17,379 ft)
- Azulcocha, 5,269 m (17,287 ft)
- Kaiko, 5,265 m (17,274 ft)
- Chaupimayo, 5,239 m (17,188 ft)
- Paccha, 5,210 m (17,090 ft)
- Coisopacana 5,176 m (16,982 ft)
- Moyoc 5,175 m (16,978 ft)
- Choquesafra, 5,152 m (16,903 ft)
- Ocobamba 5,126 m (16,818 ft)
- Cayco, 5,108 m (16,759 ft)
- Pumasillo, 5,100 m (16,700 ft)
- Yanajaja, 5,093 m (16,709 ft)
- Pitupaccha, 5,082 m (16,673 ft)
- Nañuhuaico, 4,932 m (16,181 ft)
- Yanacocha, 4,920 m (16,140 ft)
- Quenuaorco, 4,900 m (16,100 ft)
- Chuchaujasa, 4,800 m (15,700 ft)
- Mandorcasa, 4,800 m (15,700 ft)
- Llamahuasi, 4,728 m (15,512 ft)
- Jatun Huamanripa, 4,601 m (15,095 ft)
- Qiwiñayuq, 4,547 m (14,918 ft)
- Khallkaqucha, 4,464 m (14,646 ft)
- Yanaorjo, 4,460 m (14,630 ft)
- Yanama, 4,415 m (14,485 ft)
- Incahuasi, 4,315 m (14,157 ft)
