= Pumasillo =

Mountain in Peru

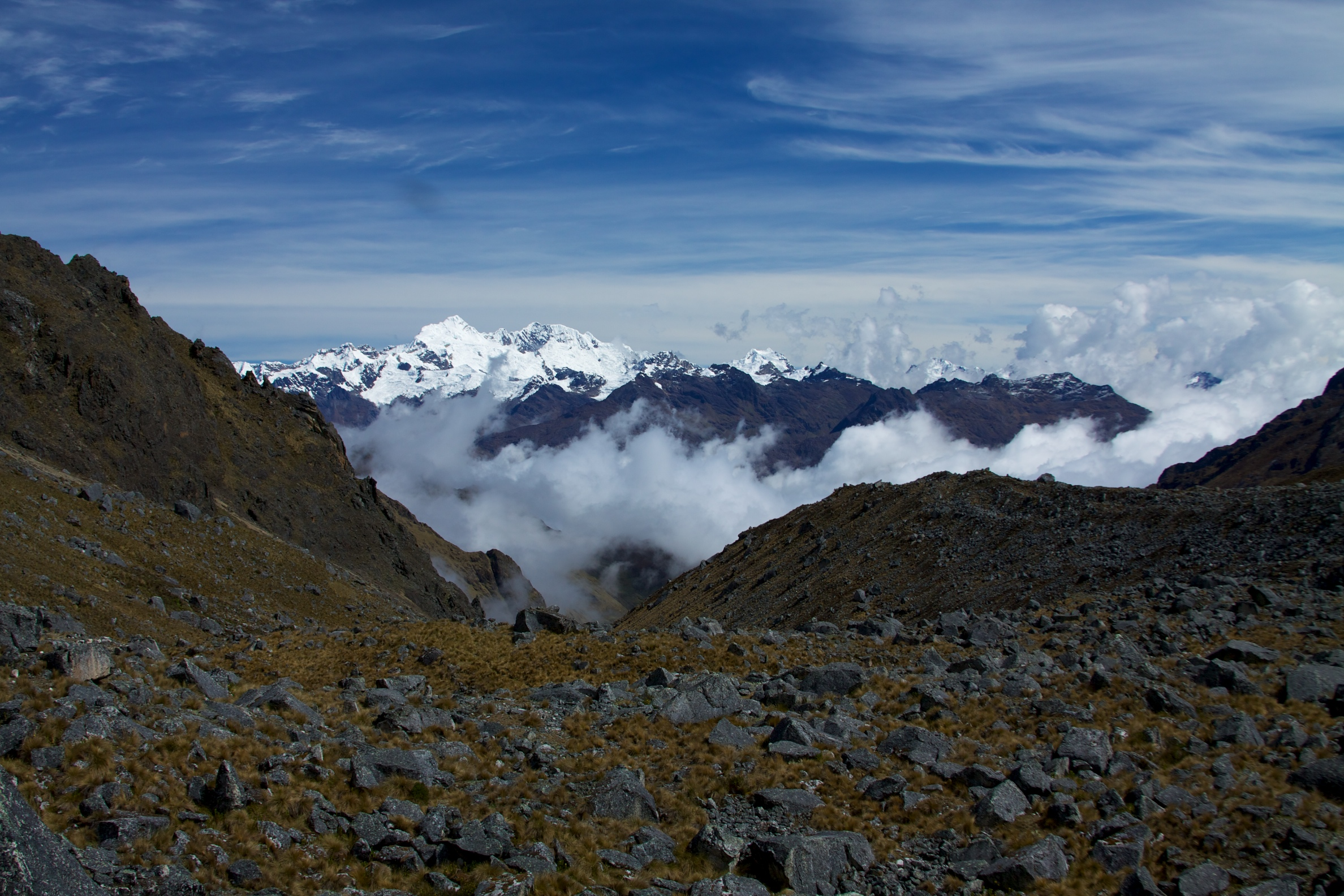
- Pumasillo

Highest point
- Elevation: 5,991 m (19,656 ft)
- Prominence: 1,397 m (4,583 ft)
- Parent peak: Salcantay
- Listing: ,
- Coordinates: 13°14′57″S 72°49′09″W

Naming
- English translation: Puma claw
- Language of name: Quechua

Geography
- Location within Peru
- Location: Cusco, Peru
- Parent range: Andes, Vilcabamba

Climbing
- First ascent: 07/26/1957 - Mike Gravina and Simon Clark (UK) via west ridge

Pumasillo (possibly from Quechua puma cougar, puma, sillu claw, "puma claw") is a mountain in the Vilcabamba mountain range in the Andes of Peru, about 5,991 m (19,656 ft) high. Pumasillo or Sacsarayoc also refers to the whole massif. It includes the peaks Pumasillo, Sacsarayoc and Lasunayoc. It is located in the Cusco Region, La Convención Province. Its slopes are within the administrative boundaries of the Peruvian city of Santa Teresa.

== Elevation ==
Other data from available digital elevation models: SRTM 5976 metres and TanDEM-X 5849 metres. The height of the nearest key col is 4594 meters, leading to a topographic prominence of 1397 meters. Pumasillo is considered a Mountain Subrange according to the Dominance System and its dominance is 23.32%. Its parent peak is Salcantay and the Topographic isolation is 30.9 kilometers.

== First Ascent ==
Pumasillo was first climbed by Mike Gravina (the son of Dorothea Gravina) and Simon Clark (UK) on 26 July 1957. Harry Carslake and John Longland (the son of Jack Longland), their expedition team-mates, reached the summit two days later and so did Colin Darbyshire, Kim Meldrum and Ronnie Wathen on the following day.
