= Apurímac River =

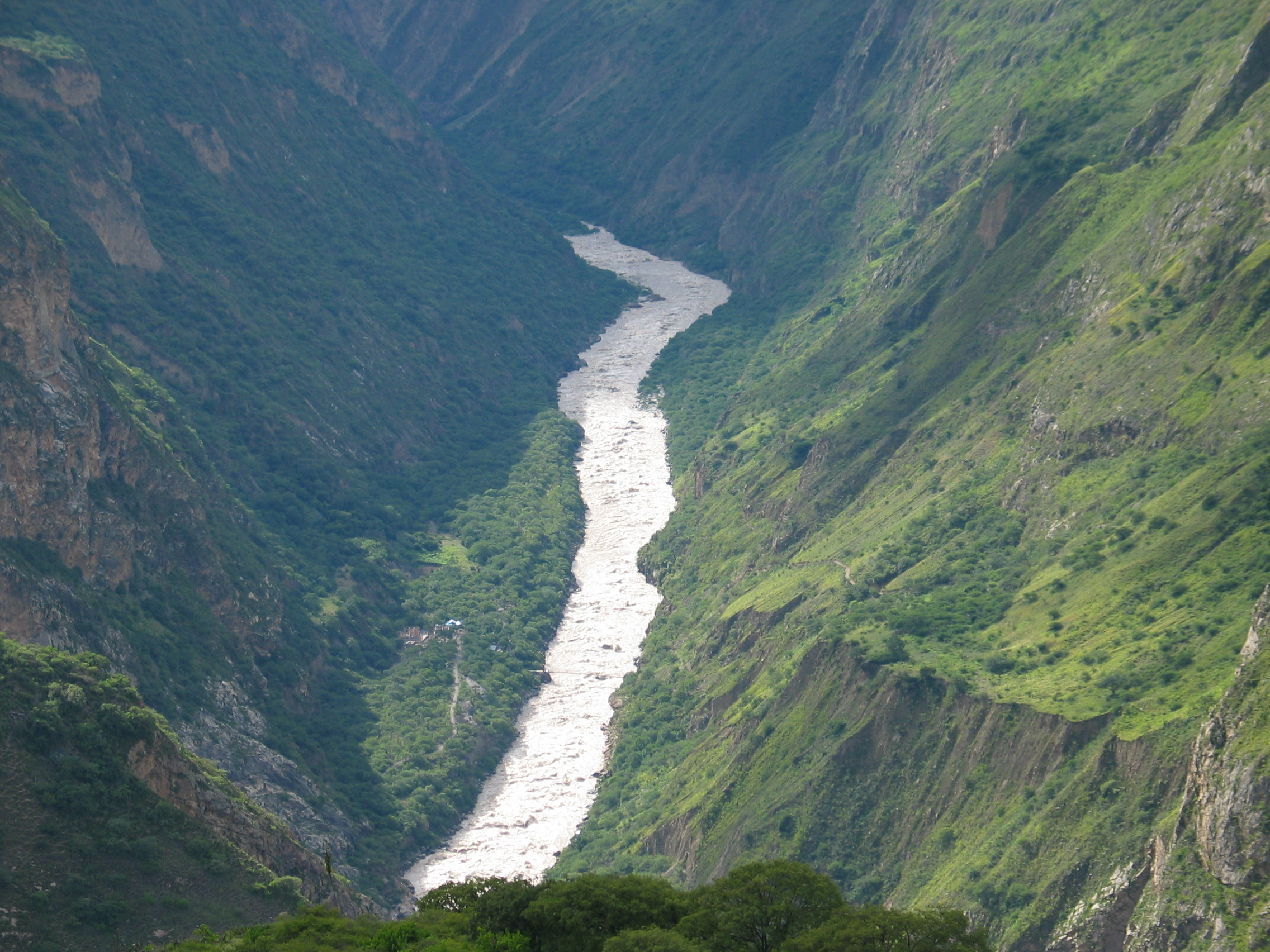
- Valley of the Río Apurímac

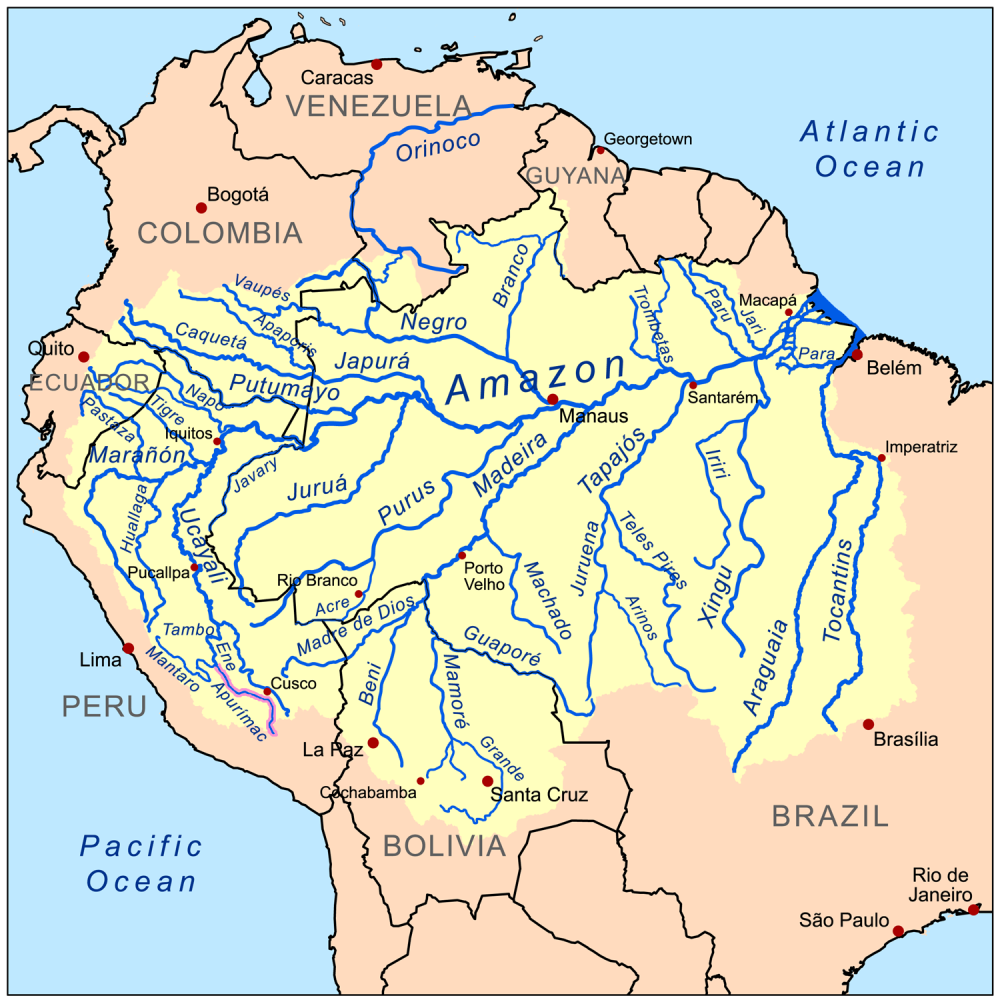
- Amazon Basin with Apurímac River highlighted (lower left)

Location
- Country: Peru
- Region: Apurímac Region, Cusco Region

Physical characteristics
- Source: Mismi
  - coordinates: 15°31′31″S 71°41′27″W
- Mouth: Ene River
  - coordinates: 12°15′46″S 73°58′44″W
- Length: 730.7 km (454.0 mi)

Basin features
- Tributaries
  - left: Qañawimayu
  - right: Hatun Wayq'u, Aqumayu

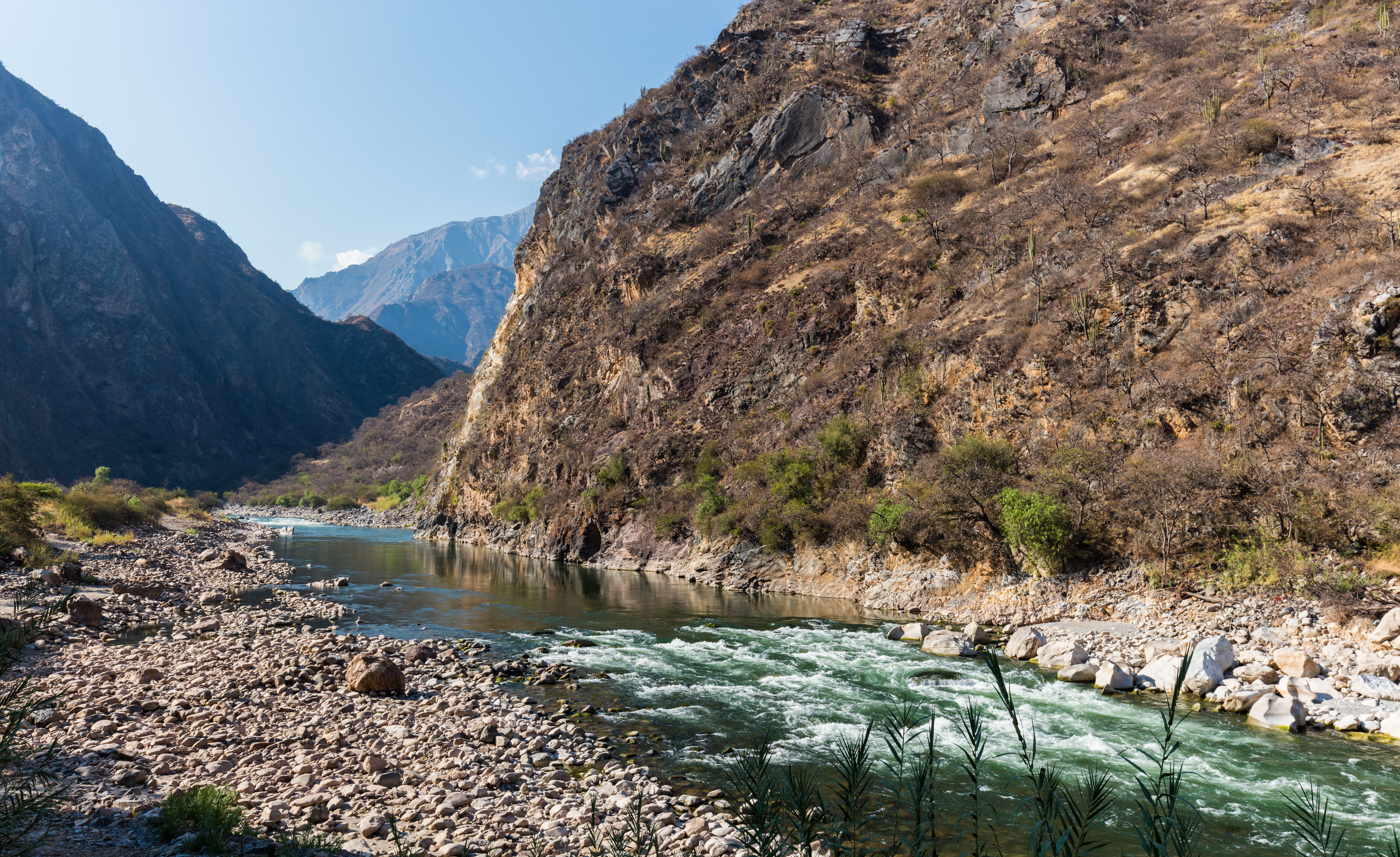
Apurímac River

The Apurímac River (Quechua: Apurimaq mayu IPA: [ˈapʊ ˈɾɪmaχ ˈmajʊ]; Spanish: río Apurímac, IPA: [ˈri.o apuˈɾimak]; from Quechua apu 'chief' and rimaq 'the one who speaks, oracle', thus 'the chief oracle') rises from glacial meltwater of the ridge of the Mismi, a 5,597-metre-high (18,363 ft) mountain in the Arequipa Province in the south-western mountain ranges of Peru, 10 km (6.2 mi) from the village Caylloma, and less than 160 km (99 mi) from the Pacific coast. It has been considered the most distant source of the Amazon River. It flows generally northwest past Cusco in narrow gorges with depths of up to 3,000 m (9,800 ft), almost twice as deep as the Grand Canyon, its course interrupted by falls and rapids. Of the six attempts to travel the full length of the Apurímac so far, only two have been successful.

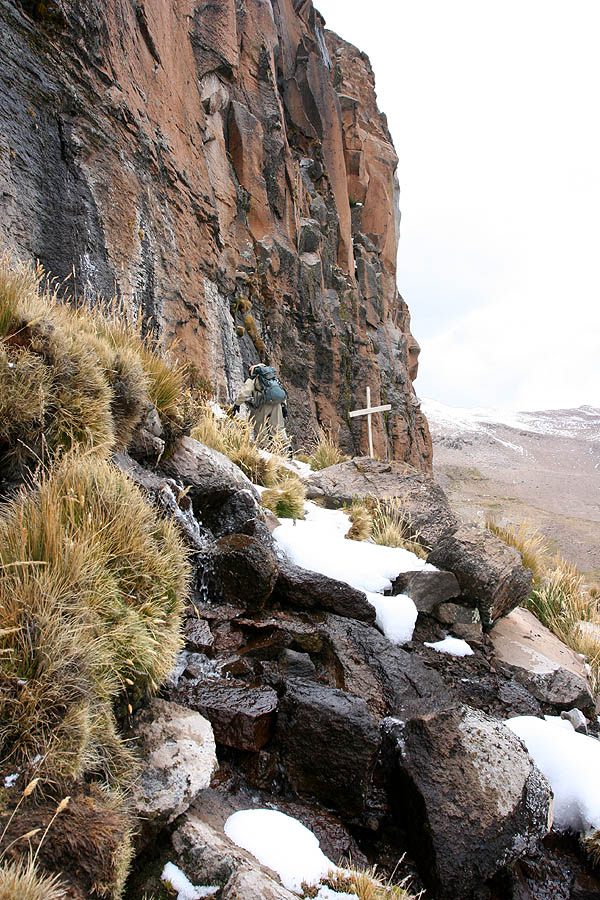
View of the source of the Apacheta stream, in the Nevado Mismi, (marked by the white cross) considered the most distant source of the Amazon River itself.

After 730 kilometres (450 mi), the Apurímac joins the Mantaro River and becomes the Ene River, 440 m (1,440 ft) above sea level; then after joining the Perené River at 330 m (1,080 ft) above sea level, it becomes the Tambo River; when it joins the Urubamba at 280 m (920 ft) above sea level the river becomes the Ucayali, which is the main headstream of the Amazon. Sometimes the complete river from its source to its junction with the Ucayali, including the rivers Ene and Tambo, is called "Apurímac", with a total length of 1,070 km (660 mi).

In the 13th century, the Inca constructed a bridge over this river which gave them access to the west. Erected around 1350, the bridge was still in use in 1864, and dilapidated but still hanging in 1890. It was the basis for the titular bridge in Thornton Wilder's 1927 novel The Bridge of San Luis Rey. One such bridge, Queshuachaca, is reassembled on an annual basis.

== See also ==
- Aqumayu
- Choquequirao
- Hatun Wayq'u
- Majes-Siguas
- Source of the Amazon River
- Arequipa Province
