= Choquetacarpo =

Mountain in Peru

- Location within Peru

Highest point
- Elevation: 5,520 m (18,110 ft)
- Coordinates: 13°13′44″S 72°51′11″W

Geography
- Location: Cusco, Peru
- Parent range: Andes, Vilcabamba

Climbing
- First ascent: 1-1959: E. ridge, N. face-1962

Choquetacarpo (possibly from Quechua chuqi metal, every kind of precious metal / gold (<Aymara), takarpu nail / stake, "metal nail" or "metal stake") is a 5,520 metres (18,110 ft) high mountain in the Vilcabamba mountain range in the Andes of Peru. It is located in the Cusco Region, La Convención Province, in the districts Santa Teresa and Vilcabamba. Choquetacarpo lies northwest of the Pumasillo peak. The little river Moyoc (Muyuq) originates east of the mountain. It flows to the south as an affluent of the Yanama River.

== See also ==
- Padreyoc
