= Panta =

Mountain in Peru

- Chachacumayoc
- Location within Peru

Highest point
- Elevation: 5,667 m (18,593 ft)
- Coordinates: 13°13′54″S 73°05′28″W

Naming
- Language of name: Quechua

Geography
- Location: Peru, Cusco Region
- Parent range: Andes, Vilcabamba

Climbing
- First ascent: 1959

Panta (possibly from Quechua for a kind of mantilla) also known as Chachacumayoc (possibly from Quechua chachakuma a kind of plant, -yuq a suffix), is a 5,667-metre-high (18,593 ft) mountain in the Vilcabamba mountain range in the Andes of Peru. It is located in the Cusco Region, La Convención Province, on the border of the districts of Inkawasi and Vilcabamba. Panta lies east of Choquesafra.
