= Machu Picchu =

15th-century Inca citadel in Peru

- Machu Pikchu (Quechua)
- Machupicchu
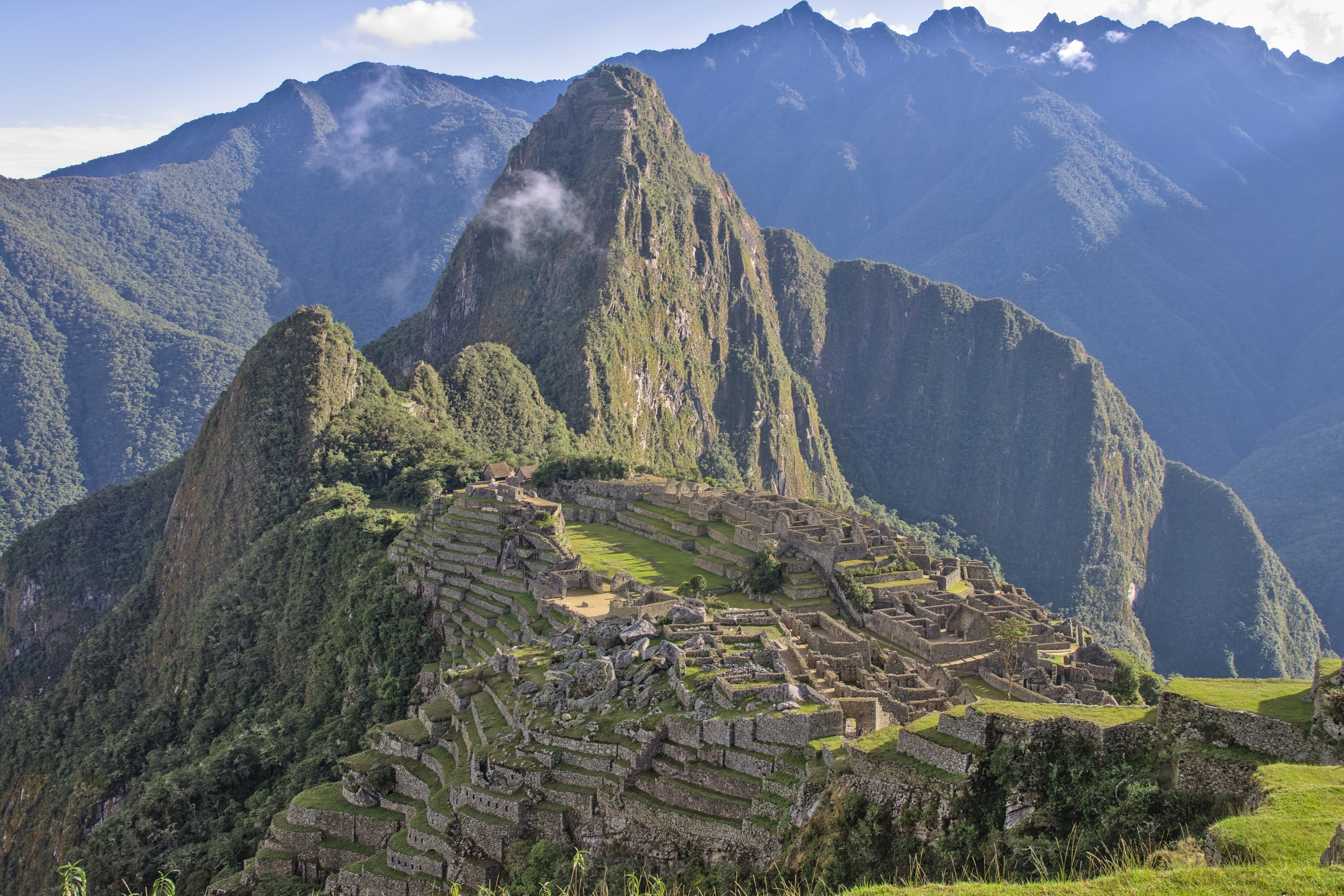
- Machu Picchu in 2023

- Location within Peru Location within South America
- Interactive map of Machu Picchu
- 13°09′48″S 72°32′44″W
- Type: Llaqta (settlement) (Note: The Quechua term llaqta is used officially for the archaeological monument. It denotes a local sacred center or territory (a huaca), its area of influence, and community, rather than a European-style town.)
- Cultures: Inca civilization
- Location: Machupicchu District, Urubamba, Cusco, Peru
- Region: Andes

History
- Built: c. 1450 – c. 1470
- Abandoned: c. 1532 – c. 1565

Site notes
- Elevation: 2,430 m (7,970 ft)
- Discovered: Agustín Lizárraga (1902); Hiram Bingham (1911)
- Condition: Preserved
- Owner: Peruvian Government
- Management: Peruvian Ministry of Culture
- Public access: Yes
- Website: machupicchu.gob.pe

UNESCO World Heritage Site
- Official name: Historic Sanctuary of Machu Picchu
- Location: Latin America and the Caribbean
- Criteria: Mixed: i, iii, vii, ix
- Reference: 274
- Inscription: 1983 (7th Session)
- Area: 38,160.87 ha (94,297.6 acres)

Machu Picchu (Note: For most English or Spanish speakers, the first 'c' in Picchu is silent.: In English, the name is pronounced /ˌmɑːtʃuː ˈpiːtʃuː/ MAH-choo PEE-choo or /ˌmætʃuː ˈpiːktʃuː/ MATCH-oo PEEK-choo.; Spanish: [ˈmatʃu ˈpitʃu] or [ˈpiɣtʃu]; Cusco Quechua: Machu Pikchu [ˈmatʃu ˈpixtʃu]) is a 15th-century Inca citadel located in the Eastern Cordillera of southern Peru on a mountain ridge at 2,430 meters (7,970 ft). It is situated in the Machupicchu District of Urubamba Province about 80 kilometers (50 miles) northwest of Cusco, above the Sacred Valley and along the Urubamba River, which forms a deep canyon with a subtropical mountain climate.

Often referred to as the "Lost City of the Incas", Machu Picchu is one of the most iconic symbols of the Inca civilization and a major archaeological site in the Americas. Estimated to be built around 1450, it is believed to have served as an estate for the Inca emperor Pachacuti, though no contemporary written records exist to confirm this. The site was abandoned roughly a century later, likely during the Spanish conquest. Modern radiocarbon dating places its occupation between c. 1420 and 1530.

Machu Picchu was constructed in the classical Inca style, featuring finely crafted dry-stone walls. Notable structures include the Temple of the Sun, the Temple of the Three Windows, and the Intihuatana ritual stone. Although the site was known locally and reached in the early 20th century by the Peruvian explorer Agustín Lizárraga, it was brought to international attention in 1911 by the American historian Hiram Bingham III. The original Inca name of the site may have been Huayna Picchu, after the mountain on which part of the complex stands.

Designated a National Historic Sanctuary by Peru in 1981 and a UNESCO World Heritage Site in 1983, Machu Picchu was also named one of the New Seven Wonders of the World in 2007. As of 2025, the site receives over 1.5 million visitors annually, making it Peru's most visited international tourist destination.

== Etymology ==
The site is on a narrow saddle between two mountain peaks, Machu Picchu and Huayna Picchu. In the Quechua language, machu means 'old' or 'old person' and wayna (spelled huayna in standard Spanish orthography) means 'young', while pikchu refers to a 'summit', 'peak', or 'pyramid'. (Note: Pikchu may also refer to a "portion of coca that is chewed".) Thus, the name of the site is often translated as 'old mountain' or 'old peak'.

Although the original name given to the settlement by its builders is not definitively known, a 2021 study in Ñawpa Pacha: Journal of the Institute of Andean Studies suggests that the site was likely called "Huayna Picchu", after the smaller peak nearby, or simply "Picchu". According to the research, the association of the name Machu Picchu with the ruins likely began with American explorer Hiram Bingham's 1911 publications, a conclusion supported by Bingham's field notes, early maps, and historical documents.

== History ==
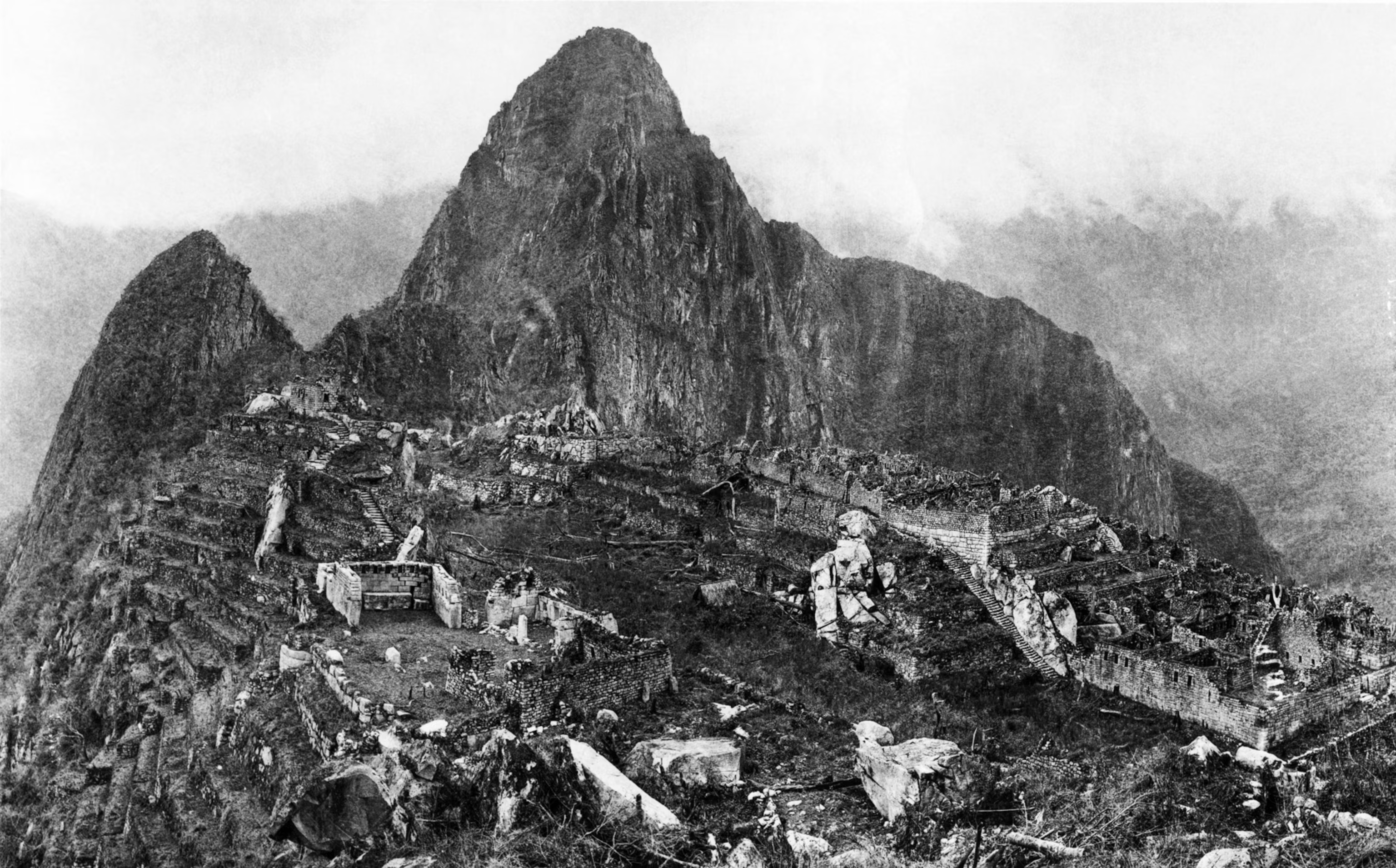
One of the first pictures of Machu Picchu, taken by Hiram Bingham III in 1912 after major clearing and before reconstruction work began

Machu Picchu’s early chronology continues to be a matter of scholarly debate. Earlier chronological models, based mainly on John H. Rowe's historical reconstruction of the reign of Pachacuti Inca Yupanqui, have placed the beginning of construction around 1450, 10 years after his takeover. However, a 2021 study led by Richard L. Burger, professor of anthropology at Yale University), reporting 26 AMS radiocarbon measurements from human remains concluded that Machu Picchu was occupied from around 1420 to 1530. Similar conclusions supporting an earlier 15th-century chronology have been reported by other radiocarbon studies. Construction appears to date from two Sapa Incas, Pachacutec Inca Yupanqui (1438–1471) and Túpac Inca Yupanqui (1472–1493).

A consensus among archaeologists is that Pachacutec ordered the construction of the royal estate after his conquest of the middle and lower Urubamba; this has been interpreted as part of a broader program of establishing royal estates along the Urubamba River. Machu Picchu’s palace complex is thought to have functioned as a seasonal royal retreat. Although Machu Picchu is considered to be a royal estate, it would not have been passed down in the line of succession. Rather, it was used for 80 years before being abandoned, seemingly because of the Spanish conquests in other parts of the Inca Empire. It is possible that most of its inhabitants died from smallpox introduced by travelers before the Spanish conquistadors even arrived in the area.

=== Before the arrival of the Spanish ===
==== Daily life in Machu Picchu ====
Ancient houses of the lower town (Hurin) within the urban sector

During its use as an estate, it is estimated that about 750 people lived there, with most serving as support staff (yanaconas) who lived there permanently. Though the estate belonged to Pachacutec, religious specialists and temporary specialized workers (mayocs) lived there as well, most likely for the ruler's well-being and enjoyment. During winter, which was usually the harsher season, staffing was reduced to a few hundred servants, and a few religious specialists focused on maintenance alone.

Studies of skeletal remains found at Machu Picchu show that most people who lived there were immigrants from diverse backgrounds. Genome-wide analyses indicate that the retainer community (yanacona and former aclla) was genetically diverse, including Andean, coastal, Ecuadorian, and Amazonian ancestries, with individuals of different ancestries living, reproducing, and being buried together. They lacked the chemical markers and osteological markers they would have if they had been living there their entire lives. Instead, research into skeletal remains has found bone damage from various species of water parasites indigenous to different areas of Peru. There were also varying osteological stressors and varying chemical densities, suggesting varying long-term diets characteristic of specific regions that were spaced apart. These diets are composed of varying levels of maize, potatoes, grains, legumes, and fish, but the last-known short-term diet for these people was overall composed of less fish and more corn. This suggests that several of the immigrants were from more coastal areas and moved to Machu Picchu, where corn was a larger portion of food intake. Most skeletal remains found at the site had lower levels of arthritis and bone fractures than those found in most sites of the Inca Empire. Incan individuals who had arthritis and bone fractures were typically those who performed heavy physical labor (such as the Mit'a) or served in the Inca military.

Animals are also suspected to have been brought to Machu Picchu, as there were several bones found that were not native to the area. Most animal bones found were from llamas and alpacas. These animals naturally live at altitudes of 4,000 meters (13,000 ft) rather than the 2,400 meters (7,900 ft) elevation of Machu Picchu. Most likely, these animals were brought in from the Puna region for meat consumption and for their pelts. Guinea pigs were also found at the site in special tomb caves, suggesting that they were at least used for funerary rituals, as it was common throughout the Inca Empire to use them for sacrifices and meat. Six dogs were also recovered from the site. Due to their placements among the human remains, it is believed that they served as companions of the dead.

==== Agricultural activity ====
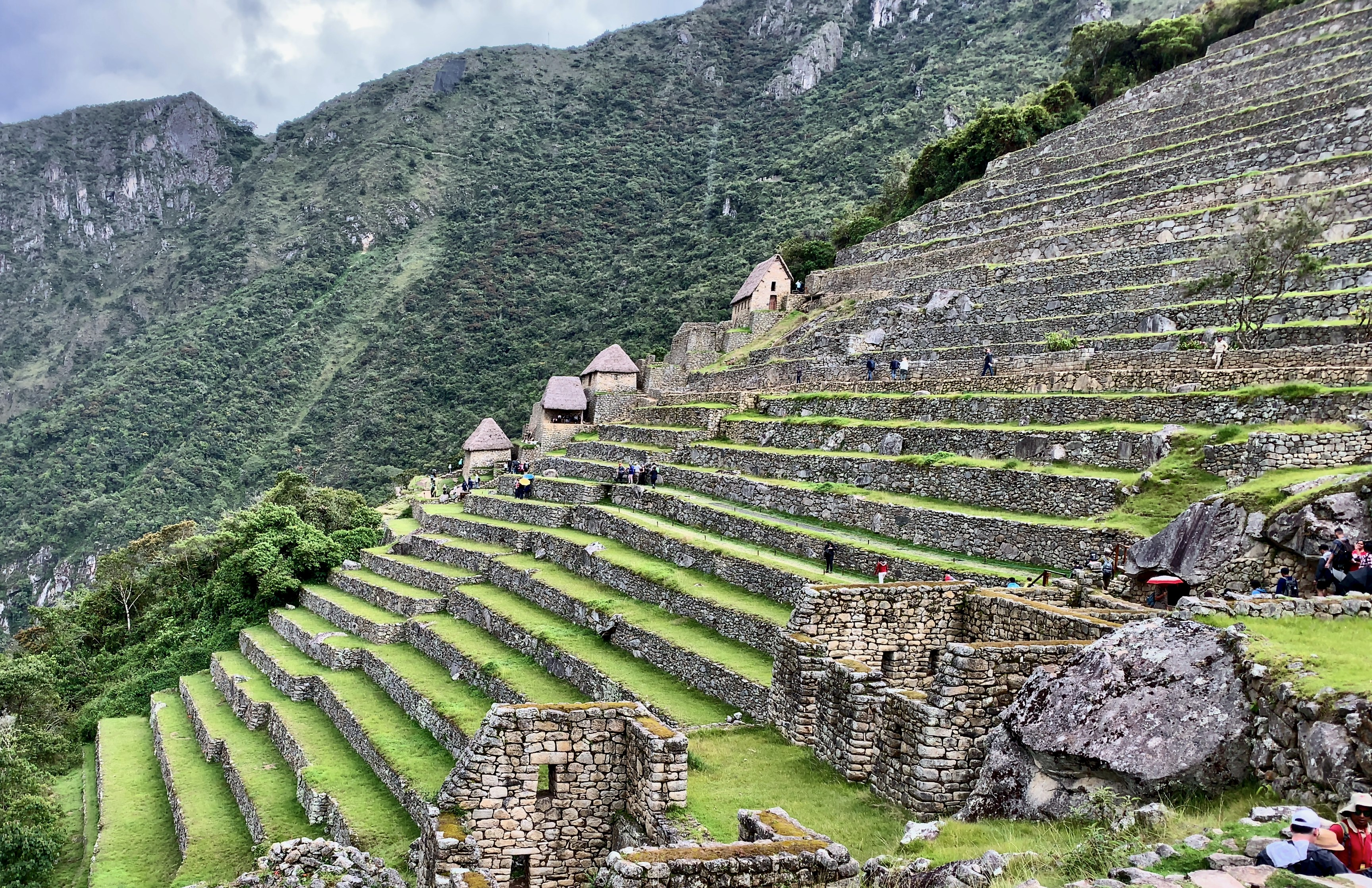
The andenes (terraces) were mostly used for slope stabilization and corn cultivation.

Much of the farming carried out at Machu Picchu was done on its andenes (artificial terraces). These terraces were a work of considerable engineering, built to ensure drainage and soil fertility while also protecting the mountain itself from erosion and landslides. However, the terraces were not perfect, as studies of the land show that there were landslides that happened during the construction of Machu Picchu. Still visible are places where the terraces were shifted by landslides and then stabilized by the Inca as they continued to build around the area. The terraces also facilitated the management of water for agriculture, increasing crop yields, with maize likely being the main crop due to its ceremonial importance, alongside possible cultivation of potatoes.

However, terrace farming area makes up only about 4.9 ha (12 acres) of land, and a study of the soil around the terraces showed that what was grown there was mostly corn and potatoes, which was not enough to support more than 750 people living at Machu Picchu. This explains why studies done on the food that the Inca ate at Machu Picchu suggest it was imported from the surrounding valleys and farther afield.

It is estimated that the area around the site has received more than 1,800 mm (71 in) of rain per year since AD 1450, which was more than that needed to support crop growth. Because of this ample rainfall, routine irrigation was generally unnecessary for the terraces. They received so much rain that they were built by Incan engineers specifically to allow for drainage of excess water. Excavation and soil analyses done by Kenneth Wright in the 1990s showed that the terraces were built in layers, with a bottom layer of larger stones covered by loose gravel. On top of the gravel was a layer of mixed sand and gravel packed together, with rich topsoil covering it. Research showed that the topsoil was probably moved from the valley floor to the terraces because it was much better than the soil higher up the mountain.

==== Rituals and offerings ====
In Inca religion, human sacrifice, most prominently the capacocha ritual involving carefully selected, unblemished children, was practised at major huacas on exceptional occasions to secure supernatural favour and to consolidate political and religious authority. At Machu Picchu, however, there is little direct evidence for human sacrifice; the archaeological record instead indicates that animal offerings, particularly camelids, were common, with the Temple of the Condor and adjacent caves interpreted as sites for ritual sacrifice. Numerous camelid remains recovered at the site have been associated with funerary rituals and other ceremonial offerings. Excavations documented approximately 104 caves and rock shelters used as burial chambers around Machu Picchu, containing the remains of about 174 individuals, interpreted as largely belonging to yanaconas of diverse ethnic origins rather than the Inca elite.

=== Encounters with Westerners ===
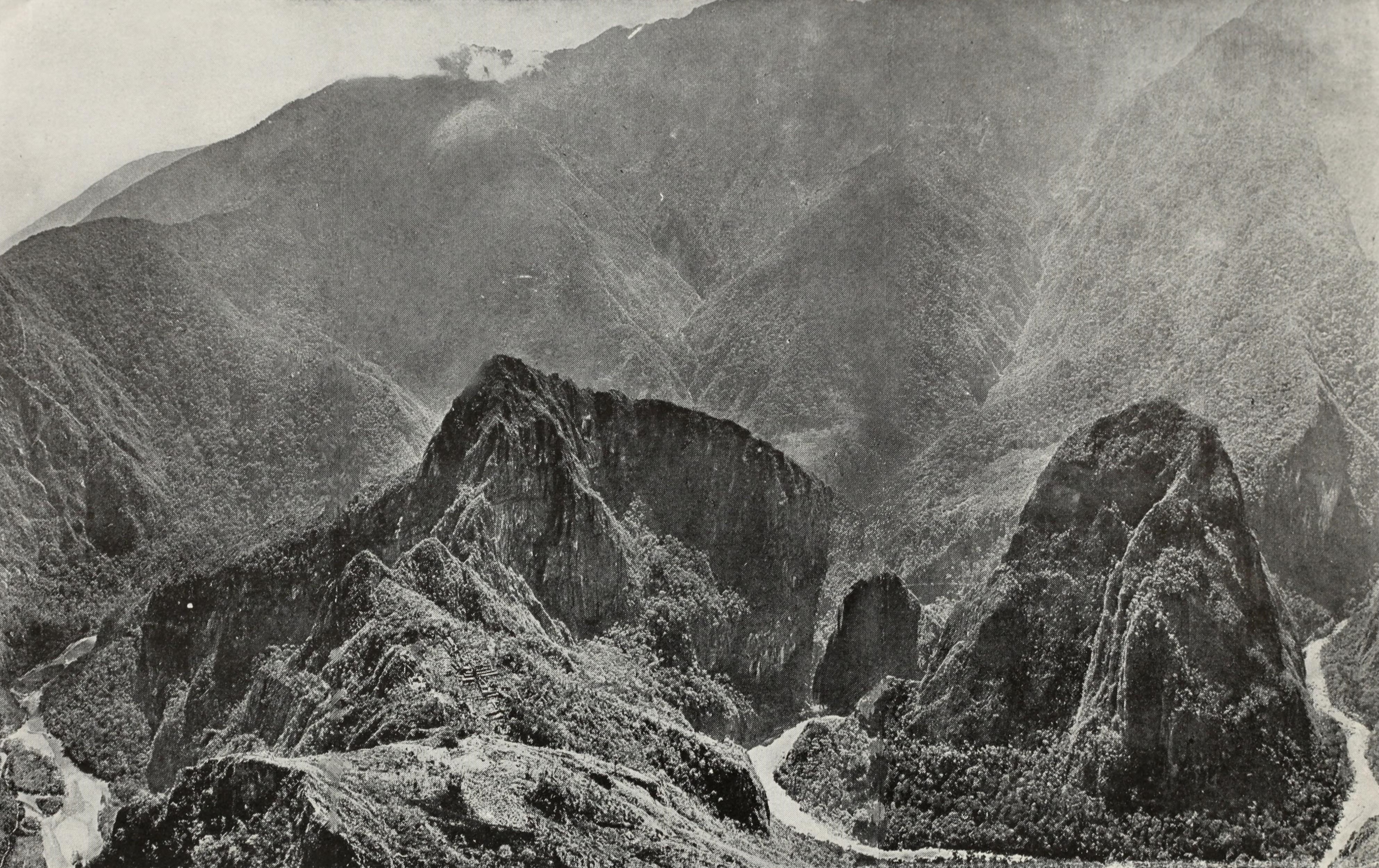
A 1912 panoramic photograph of Machu Picchu and the Urubamba Canyon, taken during early Western exploration of the site.

==== Spanish conquest ====
Machu Picchu is believed to have been abandoned in the mid-16th century, around the time of the Spanish conquest, likely due to the collapse of Inca rule and disease following European contact. In the late 16th century, Spaniards who had gained control of the area documented that indigenous individuals mentioned returning to "Huayna Picchu", the name that is believed to be originally given to the site by locals. The Spanish conquistador Baltasar de Ocampo had notes of a visit during the end of the 16th century to a mountain fortress called Pitcos with sumptuous and majestic buildings, erected with great skill and art, all the lintels of the doors, as well the principal as the ordinary ones, being of marble and elaborately carved.

Over the centuries, the surrounding jungle overgrew the site, and few outside the immediate area knew of its existence. The site may have been rediscovered and exploited in the late 19th century by the German engineer Augusto Berns. Some suggest the German engineer J. M. von Hassel arrived earlier, though there's no solid evidence. Maps reference Machu Picchu as early as 1874, and a 1904 atlas labeled it as Huayna Picchu.

==== Search for the Neo-Inca capital ====
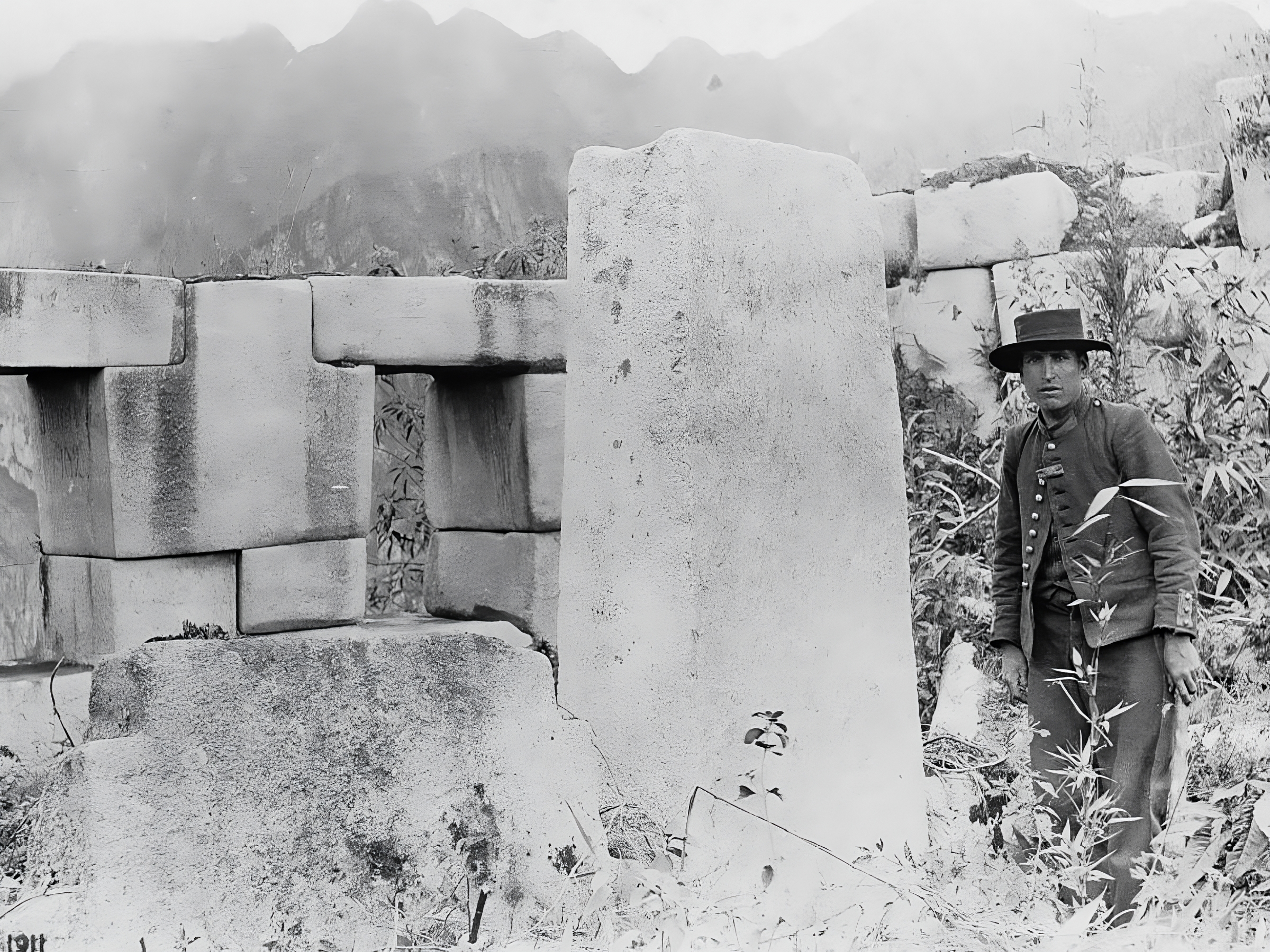
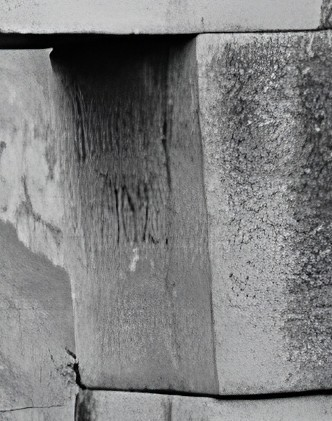
Inscription left by Agustín Lizárraga in 1902 on the Temple of the Three Windows, marking the earliest known visit to Machu Picchu in modern times.

In 1902, Peruvian explorer Agustín Lizárraga led an expedition to the area now known as Machu Picchu. After several hours of clearing undergrowth, they reached the stone structures of the citadel. During that visit, Lizárraga marked his surname and the year, "A. Lizárraga 1902", in charcoal on the central window of the Temple of the Three Windows. In 1911, American historian and explorer Hiram Bingham traveled the region looking for the lost capital of the Neo-Inca state (later established to be Vilcabamba), established by Manco Inca after the Spanish conquest. They were led to Machu Picchu by a villager, Melchor Arteaga. Bingham found the surname of Lizárraga and the 1902 date on the temple. Initially disappointed, he documented in his pocket field journal: "Agustín Lizárraga is discoverer of Machu Picchu and lives at San Miguel Bridge just before passing." However, while Bingham initially acknowledged Lizárraga as the discoverer in his early writings and speeches, including Inca Land (1922), he gradually downplayed Lizárraga's role until, in his final version of the story, Lost City of the Incas (1952), Bingham claimed to have found the site himself. In a 1922 letter to the head of the school he had once attended in Honolulu, Bingham wrote:

I suppose that in the same sense of the word as it is used in the expression "Columbus discovered America" it is fair to say that I discovered Machu Picchu. The Norsemen and the French fishermen undoubtedly visited North America long before Columbus crossed the Atlantic. On the other hand it was Columbus who made America known to the civilized world. In the same sense of the word I "discovered" Machu Picchu—in that before my visit and report on it it was not known to the geographical and historical societies in Peru, nor to the Peruvian government.

Though Bingham was not the first to visit the ruins, he was considered the scientific discoverer who brought Machu Picchu to international attention. Bingham organized another expedition in 1912 to undertake major clearing and excavation.

==== 1911 American Expedition ====
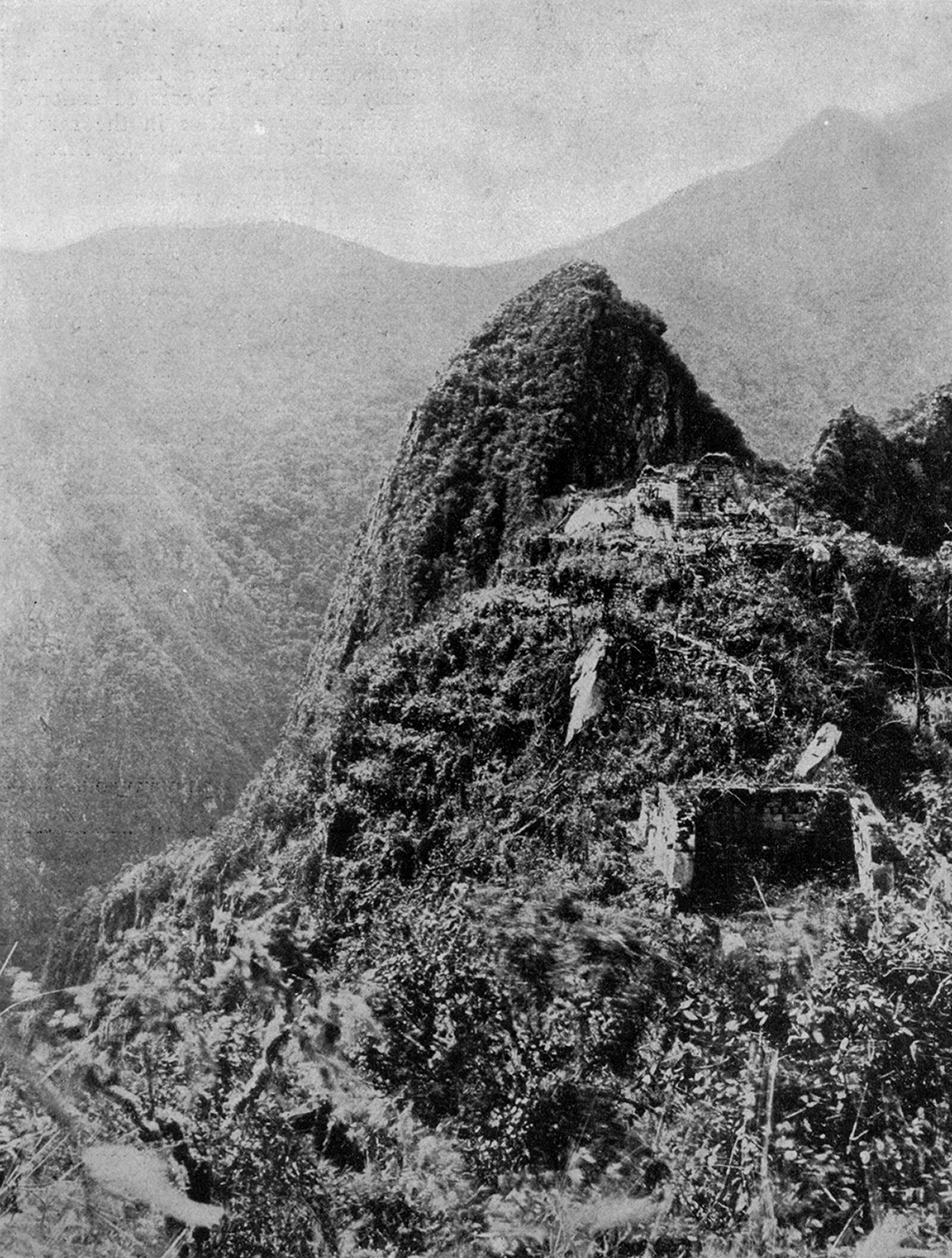
Partial view of Machu Picchu on 24 July 1911, with much of the site covered by dense vegetation.

Bingham was a lecturer at Yale University, although not a trained archaeologist. In 1909, returning from the Pan-American Scientific Congress in Santiago, he travelled through Peru. He was invited to explore the Inca ruins at Choqquequirau in the Apurímac Valley. He organized the 1911 Yale Peruvian Expedition in part to search for the Inca capital, which was thought to be the city of Vitcos, reportedly located near the town of Torontoy. He consulted Carlos Romero, one of the chief historians in Lima, who showed him helpful references and Father Antonio de la Calancha's Corónica moralizada del Orden de San Agustín en el Perú (Chronicle of the Augustinians), first published in 1631. In particular, Ramos thought Vitcos was "near a great white rock over a spring of fresh water." Back in Cusco again, Bingham asked planters about the places mentioned by Calancha, particularly along the Urubamba River. According to Bingham, "one old prospector said there were interesting ruins at Machu Picchu," though his statements "were given no importance by the leading citizens." Only later did Bingham learn that Charles Wiener had also heard of the ruins at Huayna Picchu and Machu Picchu, but was unable to reach them.

Armed with this information, Bingham's expedition went down the Urubamba River. En route, Bingham asked local people to show them Inca ruins, especially any place described as having a white rock over a spring.

At Mandor Pampa, Bingham asked farmer and innkeeper Melchor Arteaga if he knew of any nearby ruins. Arteaga said he knew of excellent ruins on the top of Huayna Picchu. The next day, 24 July, Arteaga led Bingham and Sergeant Carrasco across the river on a log bridge and up to the Machu Picchu site. At the top of the mountain, they came across a small hut occupied by a couple of Quechua people, Richarte and Alvarez, who were farming some of the original Machu Picchu agricultural terraces that they had cleared four years earlier. Richarte's 11-year-old son, Pablito, led Bingham along the ridge to the main ruins.

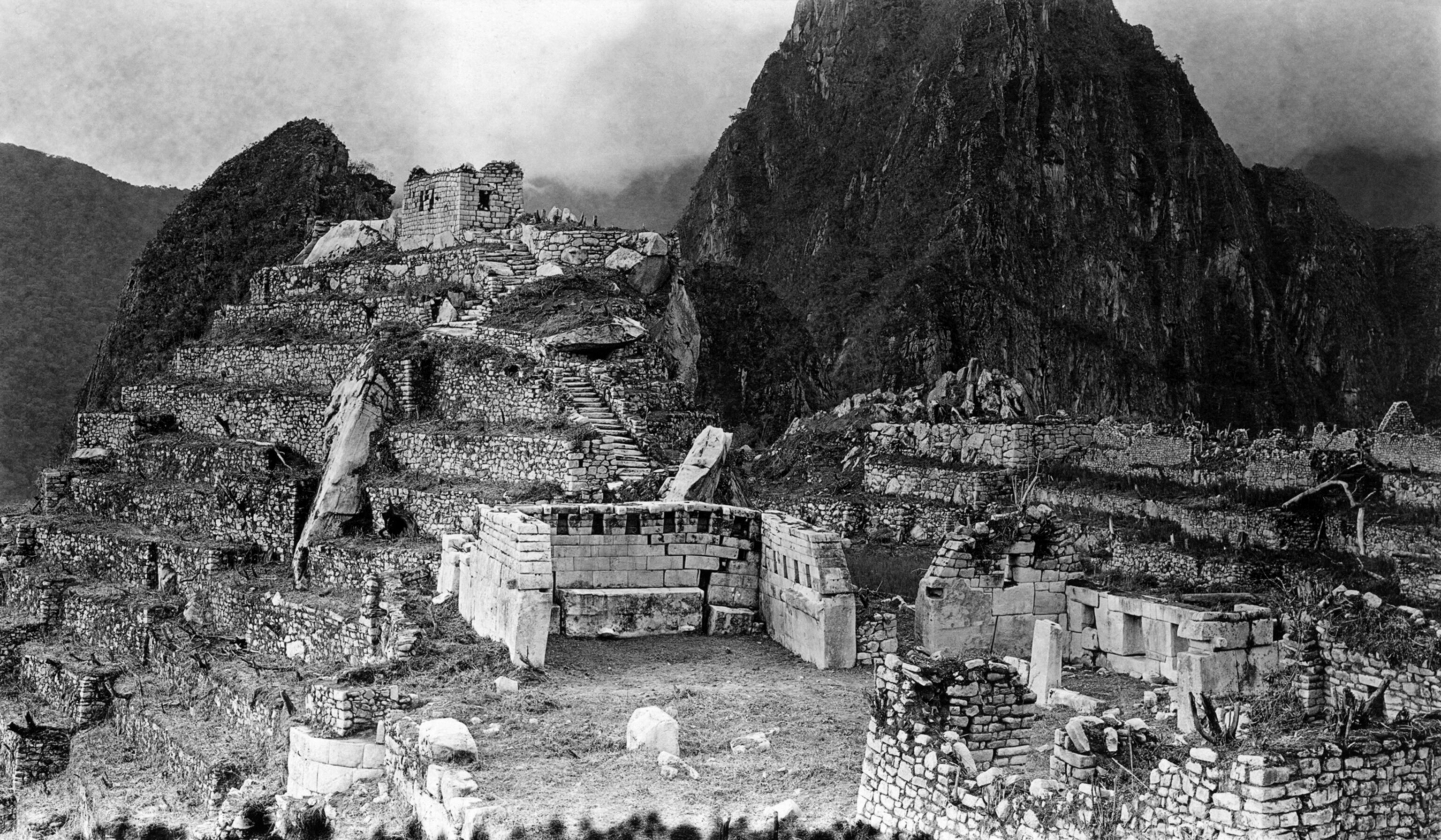
The Sacred Plaza, the Main Temple, and the Temple of the Three Windows after the 1912 clearing work. Above these structures is the Sacred Hill, which features the Intihuatana.

The ruins were mostly covered with vegetation except for the cleared agricultural terraces and clearings used by the farmers as vegetable gardens. Because of the vegetation, Bingham was not able to observe the full extent of the site. He took preliminary notes, measurements, and photographs, noting the fine quality of the Inca stonework of several principal buildings. Bingham was unsure about the original purpose of the ruins, but concluded there was no indication that it matched the description of Vitcos.

The expedition continued down the Urubamba and up the Vilcabamba Rivers, examining all the ruins they could find. Guided by locals, Bingham rediscovered and correctly identified the site of the old Inca capital, Vitcos (then called Rosaspata), and the nearby temple of Chuquipalta. He then crossed a pass and into the Pampaconas Valley where he found more ruins heavily buried in the jungle undergrowth at Espíritu Pampa, which he named "Trombone Pampa". As was the case with Machu Picchu, the site was so heavily overgrown that Bingham could only note a few of the buildings. In 1964, Gene Savoy further explored the ruins at Espiritu Pampa and revealed the full extent of the site, identifying it as Vilcabamba Viejo, where the Incas fled after the Spanish drove them from Vitcos.

==== Excavations and controversy (1912–1915) ====
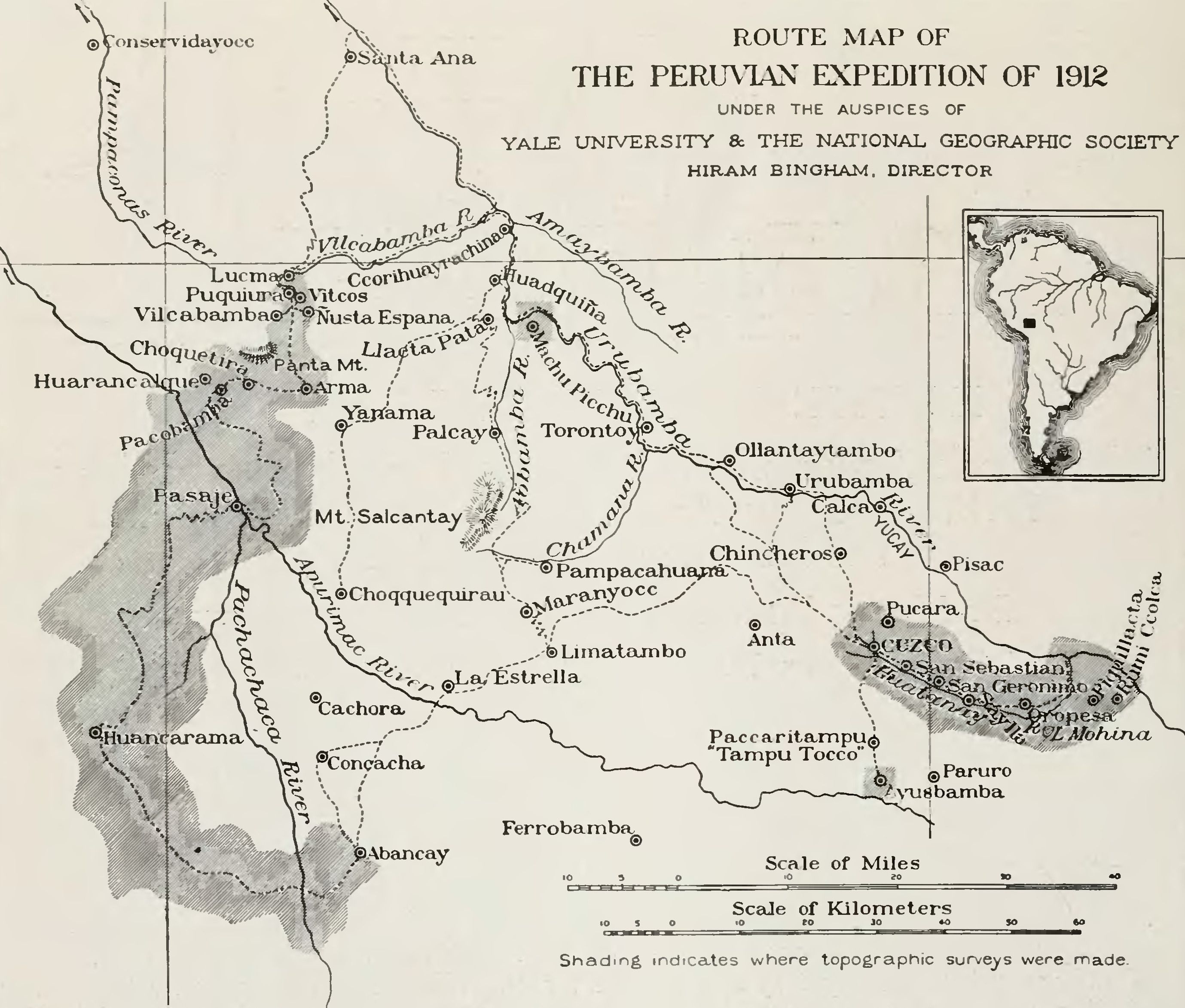
Route map of the 1912 Yale Peruvian Expedition, which carried out the first archaeological excavations at Machu Picchu.

Bingham returned to Machu Picchu in 1912 under the sponsorship of Yale University and the National Geographic Society. The expedition conducted site clearing and archaeological work between July and November of that year, under the supervision of George Eaton and Ellwood Erdis. These efforts included burnings, vegetation removal, mapping, and excavations, many of which were carried out with the assistance of local labor organized in part by Ángel Lizárraga, younger brother of Agustín Lizárraga. The work was supported logistically by regional authorities, including the Prefect of Cusco. Excavations resumed in 1914 and 1915 during a subsequent expedition. Although Bingham proposed several hypotheses regarding the purpose and significance of the site, none have been substantiated by later research. During the expeditions, numerous artifacts were recovered and transported to Yale University. Among these was a set of 15th-century ceremonial Incan knives made from bismuth bronze, which are the earliest known artifacts to contain this alloy.

Although local institutions initially welcomed the exploration, they soon accused Bingham of legal and cultural malpractice. Rumors arose that the team was stealing artifacts and smuggling them out of Peru through Bolivia. In fact, Bingham removed many artifacts, but openly and legally; they were deposited in the Yale University Museum. Bingham was abiding by the 1852 Civil Code of Peru; the code stated that "archaeological finds generally belonged to the discoverer, except when they had been discovered on private land". Local press perpetuated the accusations, claiming that the excavation harmed the site and deprived local archaeologists of knowledge about their own history. Landowners began to demand rent from the excavators. By the time Bingham and his team left Machu Picchu, locals had formed coalitions to defend their ownership of Machu Picchu and its cultural remains, while Bingham claimed the artifacts ought to be studied by experts in American institutions.

==== Dispute over cultural artifacts ====
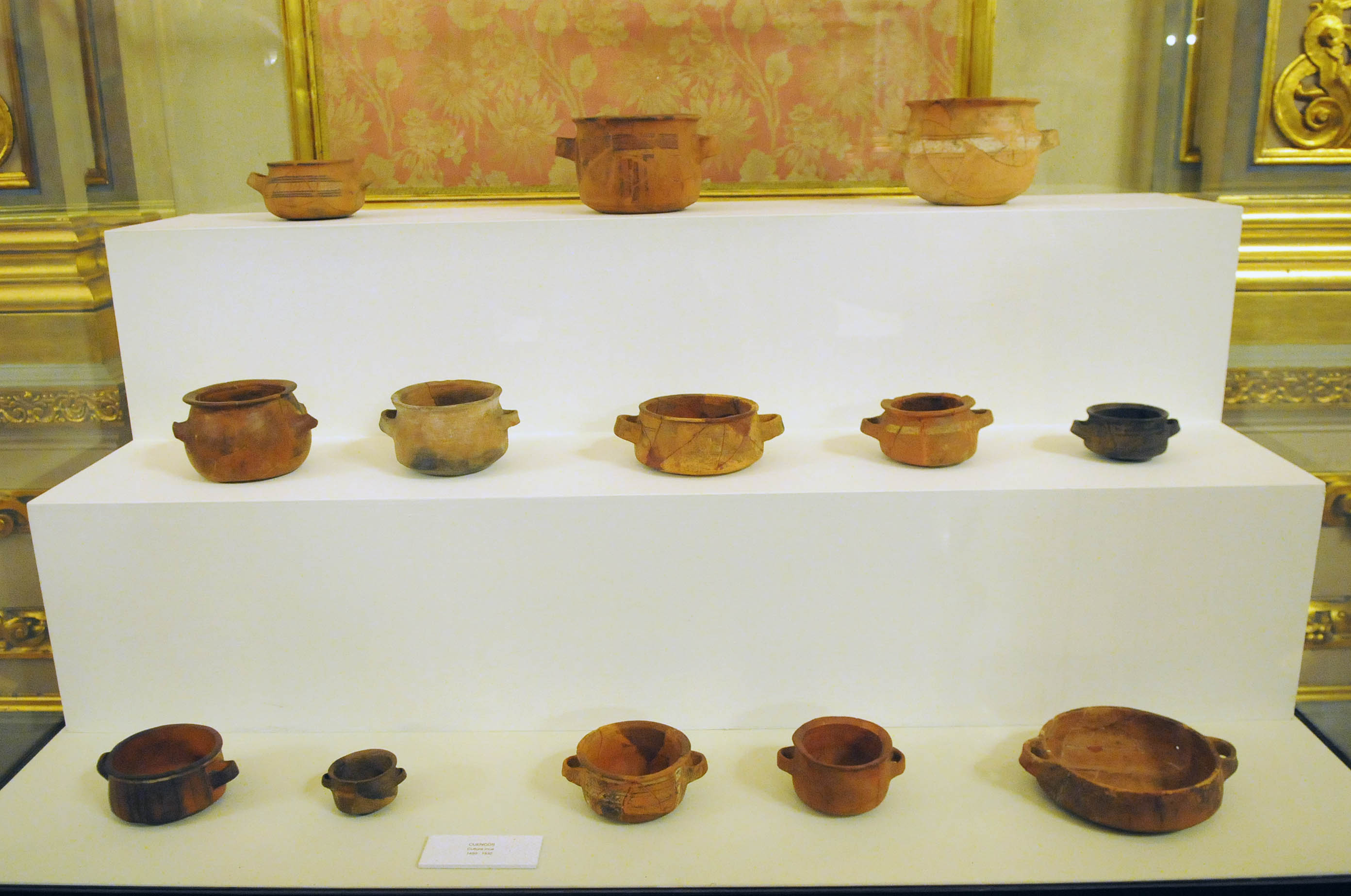
Aryballos and bowls part of the first batch of thousands of Machu Picchu artifacts returned by Yale University in 2011.

In 1912, 1914, and 1915, Bingham removed thousands of artifacts from Machu Picchu—ceramic vessels, silver statues, jewelry, and human bones—and took them to Yale University for further study, supposedly for 18 months. Yale instead kept the artifacts until 2012, arguing that Peru lacked the infrastructure and systems to care for them. Eliane Karp, an anthropologist and wife of former Peruvian President Alejandro Toledo, accused Yale of profiting from Peru's cultural heritage. Many of the articles were exhibited at Yale's Peabody Museum.

In 2006, Yale returned some pieces but retained more than 250 "museum-quality" pieces, claiming this was supported by federal case law of Peruvian antiquities. In 2007, the Peruvian government and Yale had agreed on a joint traveling exhibition and construction of a new museum and research center in Cusco advised by Yale. Yale acknowledged Peru's title to all the objects, but would share rights with Peru in the research collection, part of which would remain at Yale for continuing study. In November 2010, Yale agreed to return the disputed artifacts. The third and final batch of artifacts was delivered in November 2012. The artifacts are permanently exhibited at the Machu Picchu Museum–Casa Concha, located near Cusco's colonial center and owned by the National University of San Antonio Abad del Cusco.

==== Later archaeological research and scientific studies ====
After Bingham's expeditions, state and institutional projects carried out mainly restoration and limited excavations between 1929 and 1971. From the 1970s to the 1990s, a series of targeted excavations and conservation programs recovered mainly Inca artifacts (ceramics, stone tools, and metal objects). They documented disturbed or reworked layers within the site. Between 2014 and 2017, the Archaeological and Interdisciplinary Research Program in the Historic Sanctuary of Machupicchu (PIAISHM) carried out systematic excavations, pollen studies, and architectural analyses that clarified construction phases, recorded offerings, and refined interpretations of its function and population. Radiocarbon dating analyses have refined the site's chronology, indicating that Machu Picchu’s main construction and use fall in the early to mid 15th century, slightly earlier than some traditional documentary chronologies suggest. Between 2017 and 2019, an international team led by Nicola Masini of Italy’s CNR investigated the Principal Plaza using archaeological, remote-sensing, and geophysical data. The study found that the area evolved from a natural drainage basin to a quarry before being reshaped with subsurface drainage. The plaza was likely built in at least two phases, beginning as a smaller sunken plaza (plaza hundida) that was later raised and expanded into the present ceremonial space.

== Current state ==
=== Preservation ===
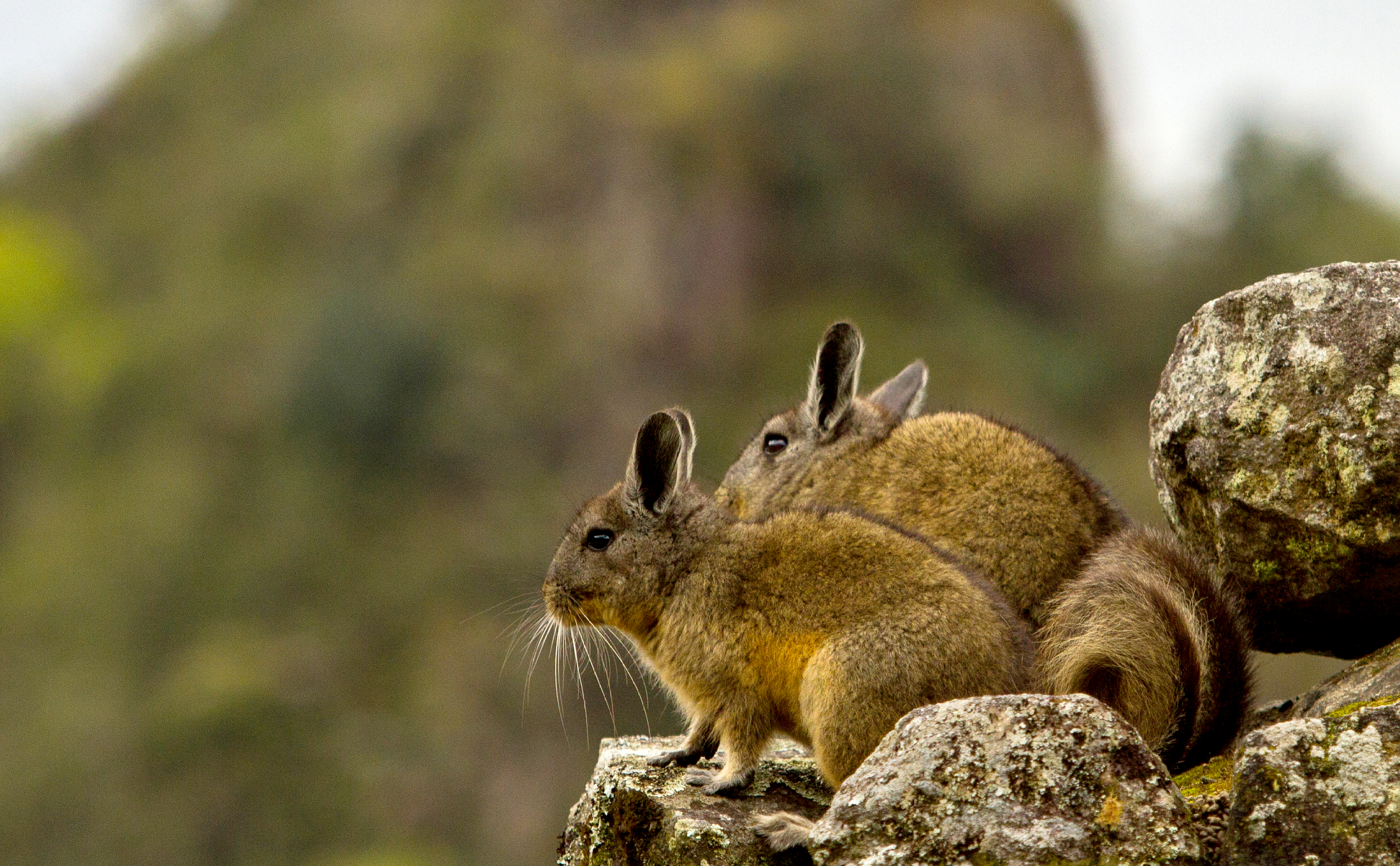
Lagidium peruanum, one of the 70 species of mammals found in the city

In 1981, Peru declared an area of 325.92 square kilometers (125.84 sq mi) surrounding Machu Picchu a "Historic Sanctuary". In addition to the ruins, the sanctuary includes a large portion of the adjoining region, rich with the flora and fauna of the Peruvian Yungas and Central Andean wet puna ecoregions.

Beyond its historical significance, Machu Picchu houses a diverse range of species. Among them are the Andean fox, puma, vizcacha, spectacled bear, and white-tailed deer. The sanctuary is also a habitat for more than 420 bird species, such as the cock-of-the-rock and the Andean condor. The area hosts over 550 tree species across 74 families, including ferns, gymnosperms, and palms.

In 1983, UNESCO designated Machu Picchu a World Heritage Site, describing it as "a masterpiece of art, urbanism, architecture and engineering" and "a unique testimony" of the Inca civilization, with the inscription covering both the archaeological complex and its surrounding landscape.

=== The modern town of Machu Picchu ===
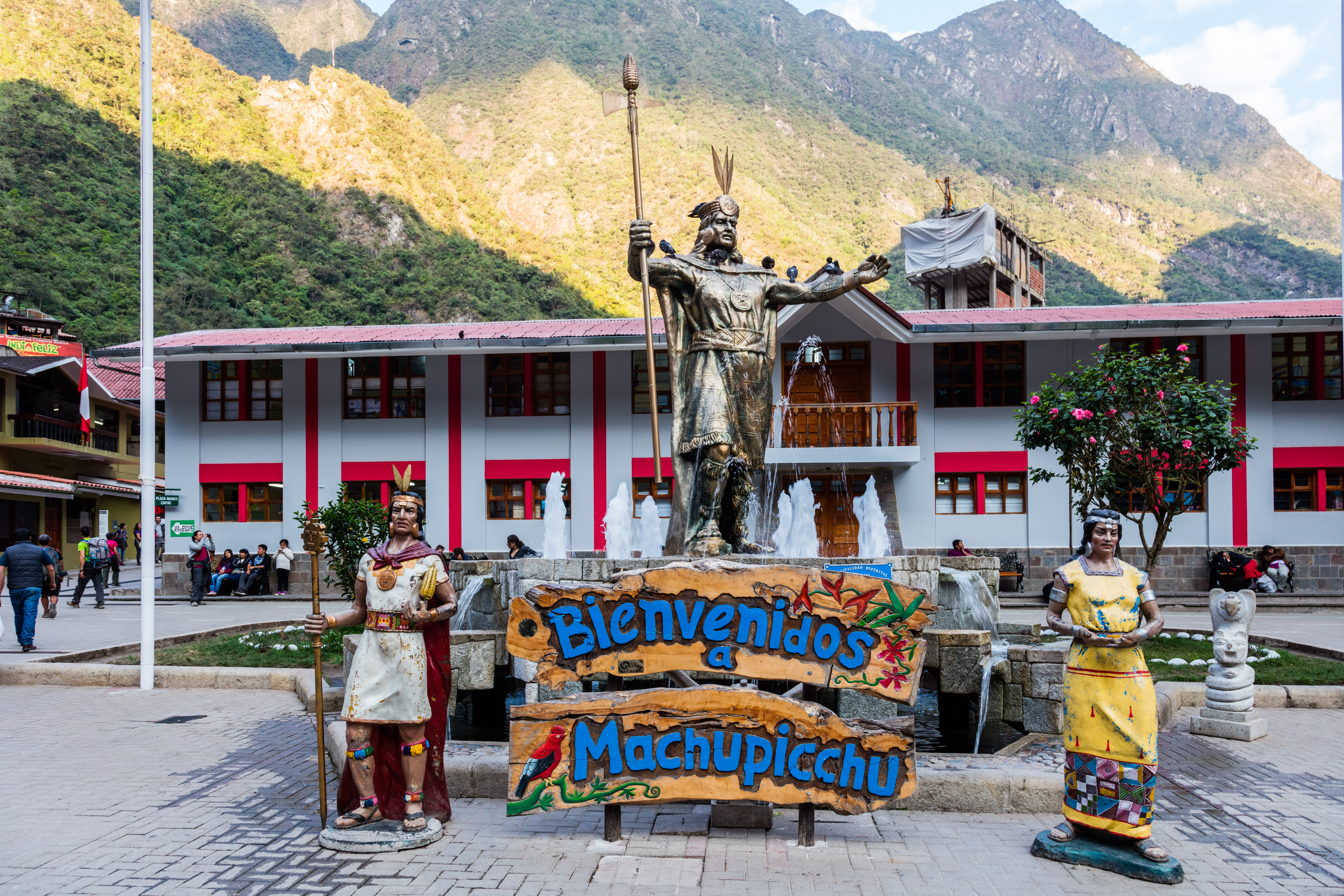
Main square of Aguas Calientes, the modern town established near Machu Picchu in the 20th century.

Along the Urubamba river, below the ruins, surrounding the train line "street", is the town of Machu Picchu, also known as Aguas Calientes (hot springs), with a post office, a train station, hotels, and other services for the many tourists. The station, called Puente Ruinas (bridge to the ruins), is the end of the line for the tren de turismo (tourist train), which arrives every morning from Cusco and returns every afternoon. There is also a luxury hotel on the mountain, near the ruins.

Machu Picchu is officially twinned with Haworth, West Yorkshire, United Kingdom, as well as Fukushima and Ōtama, Japan, Petra, Jordan, Medley, United States, and Tinum, Mexico.

=== Tourist activity ===
Machu Picchu is both a cultural and natural UNESCO World Heritage Site. Since Hiram Bingham's expedition, growing numbers of tourists have visited the site each year, with numbers exceeding 1.5 million in 2025. As Peru's most visited tourist attraction and a major revenue generator, it is continually exposed to economic and commercial forces. In the late 1990s, the Peruvian government granted concessions to allow the construction of a cable car and a luxury hotel, including a tourist complex with boutiques and restaurants and a bridge to the site. These plans faced widespread protests, with critics arguing that the government had failed to conduct a proper environmental impact survey, as requested by the National Institute of Natural Resources, which warned of potential harm to the ecosystem. In 2018, plans were restarted to construct a cable car again to encourage Peruvians to visit Machu Picchu and boost domestic tourism. A no-fly zone exists above the area. UNESCO considered including Machu Picchu on its List of World Heritage in Danger in 2017 due to overcrowding concerns, but ultimately decided against it.

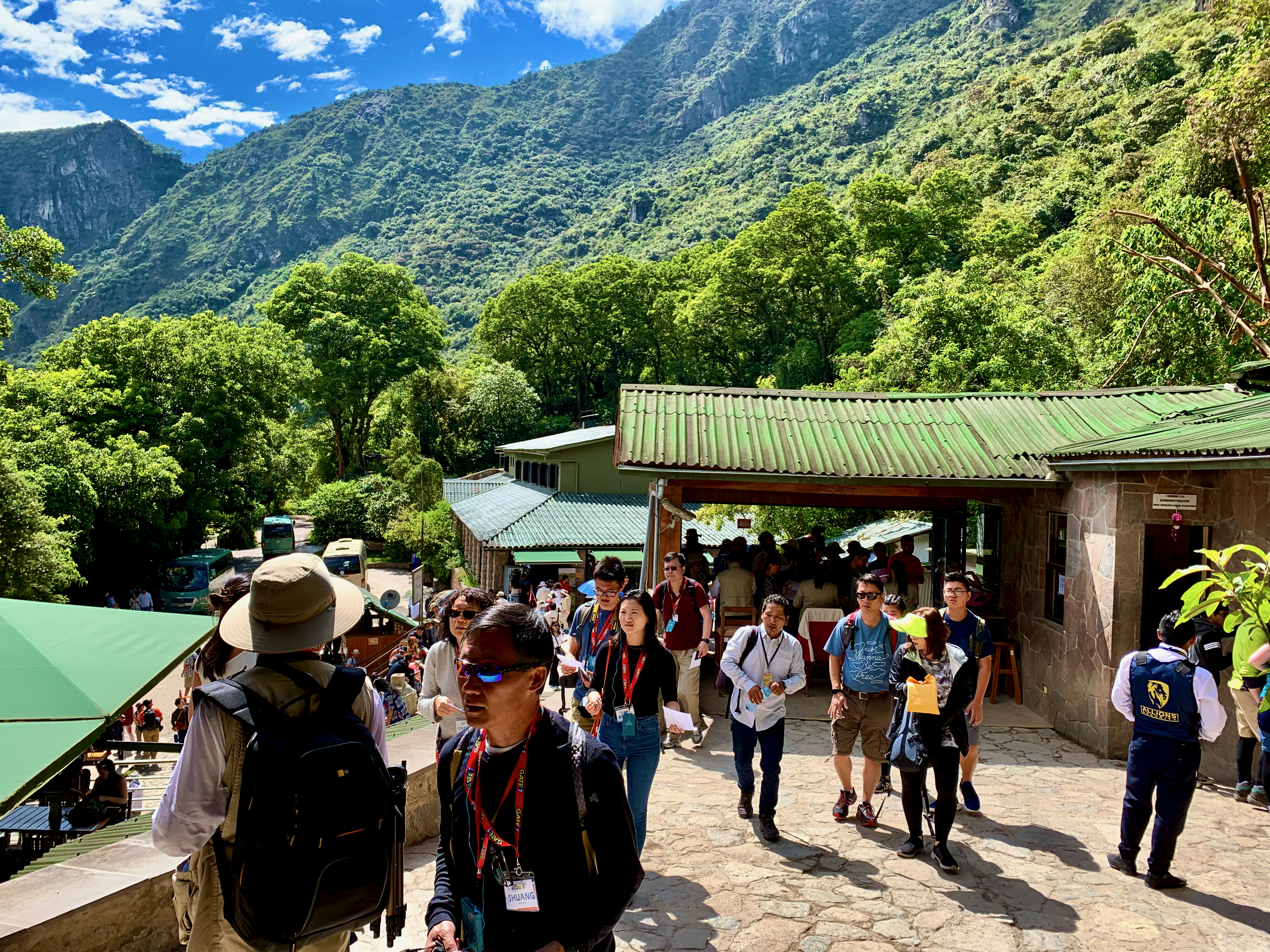
Tourists entering Machu Picchu, which received over 1.5 million visitors in 2025 (about 4,100 per day), a fourfold increase since 2000.

Efforts to manage the impact of tourism have included various measures over the years. In the 1980s, a rock from Machu Picchu's central plaza was moved to create a helicopter landing zone, a practice that was later stopped. In 2006, the company Helicusco sought approval for tourist flights over the site, but the license was soon rescinded. In January 2010, severe flooding caused by El Niño trapped over 4,000 people and disrupted access to Machu Picchu, leading to its temporary closure. The site reopened on April 1, 2010. To further address tourism's impact, stricter entrance regulations were introduced in July 2011, limiting the number of daily visitors to 2,500 per day to the citadel. In 2018, a new entrance system was added to manage tourism better and reduce site degradation. In 2024, the daily visitor limit was officially increased to 4,500, with up to 5,600 permitted during peak season.

In May 2012, UNESCO urged additional protection measures for the site's buffer zone, especially due to the rapid growth in the nearby town of Aguas Calientes. Tourist deaths at Machu Picchu from altitude sickness, floods, and accidents have led to criticism of UNESCO for allowing visits despite the site's high safety risks. The trend of nude tourism in 2014 also led to increased surveillance by Peru's Ministry of Culture to end the practice.

In recognition of efforts to manage and protect the site, Fernando Astete, who served as Chief of the National Archaeological Park of Machu Picchu from 1994 to 2019, was honored with the "Personalidad Meritoria de la Cultura" award by the Ministry of Culture of Peru in January 2020. This award acknowledged his extensive contributions to the preservation, management, and study of Machu Picchu.

Machu Picchu was closed to visitors in March 2020 because of the COVID-19 pandemic. In October 2020, the site was briefly opened to allow one stranded Japanese tourist to visit. It reopened in November 2020 after an eight-month shutdown, the initial reopening limited admissions to 675 visitors per day under strict biosafety protocols. During the 2022–2023 Peruvian protests, routes to Machu Picchu were blocked, trapping thousands of tourists and leading to a government airlift of the stranded visitors. Due to these disruptions, the Ministry of Culture closed the site indefinitely on 22 January 2023. It was reopened on 15 February 2023.

== Geography ==
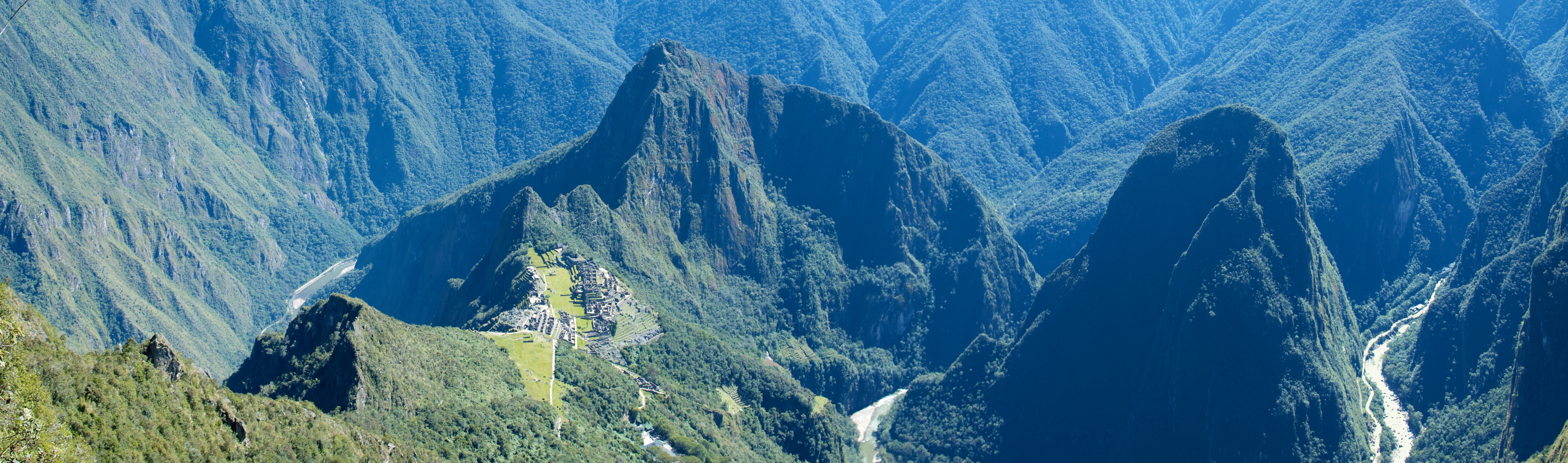
Machu Picchu from Machu Picchu Mountain, showing the site surrounded on three sides by the Urubamba River.

Machu Picchu lies in the Southern Hemisphere, 13.111 degrees south of the equator. It is 80 kilometers (50 miles) northwest of Cusco, on the crest of the mountain Machu Picchu, located about 2,430 meters (7,970 feet) above mean sea level, over 1,000 meters (3,300 ft) lower than Cusco, which has an elevation of 3,400 meters (11,200 ft). As such, it had a milder climate than the Inca capital. It is one of the most important archaeological sites in South America, one of the most visited tourist attractions in Latin America, and the most visited in Peru.

Machu Picchu is situated above a bow of the Urubamba River, which surrounds the site on three sides, where cliffs drop vertically for 450 meters (1,480 ft) to the river at their base. The area is subject to morning mists rising from the river. Hermann Buse suggested that the site’s location, chosen for its sacred geographic features, was intentionally kept secret and served as an imperial refuge for Inca elites. Archaeological surveys have identified multiple possible pre-Hispanic bridges across the Urubamba River, which ranged from hanging rope bridges to simple log and rope structures, and several abutments and road segments near the site indicate bridge locations. However, much of the evidence has been affected by river floods.

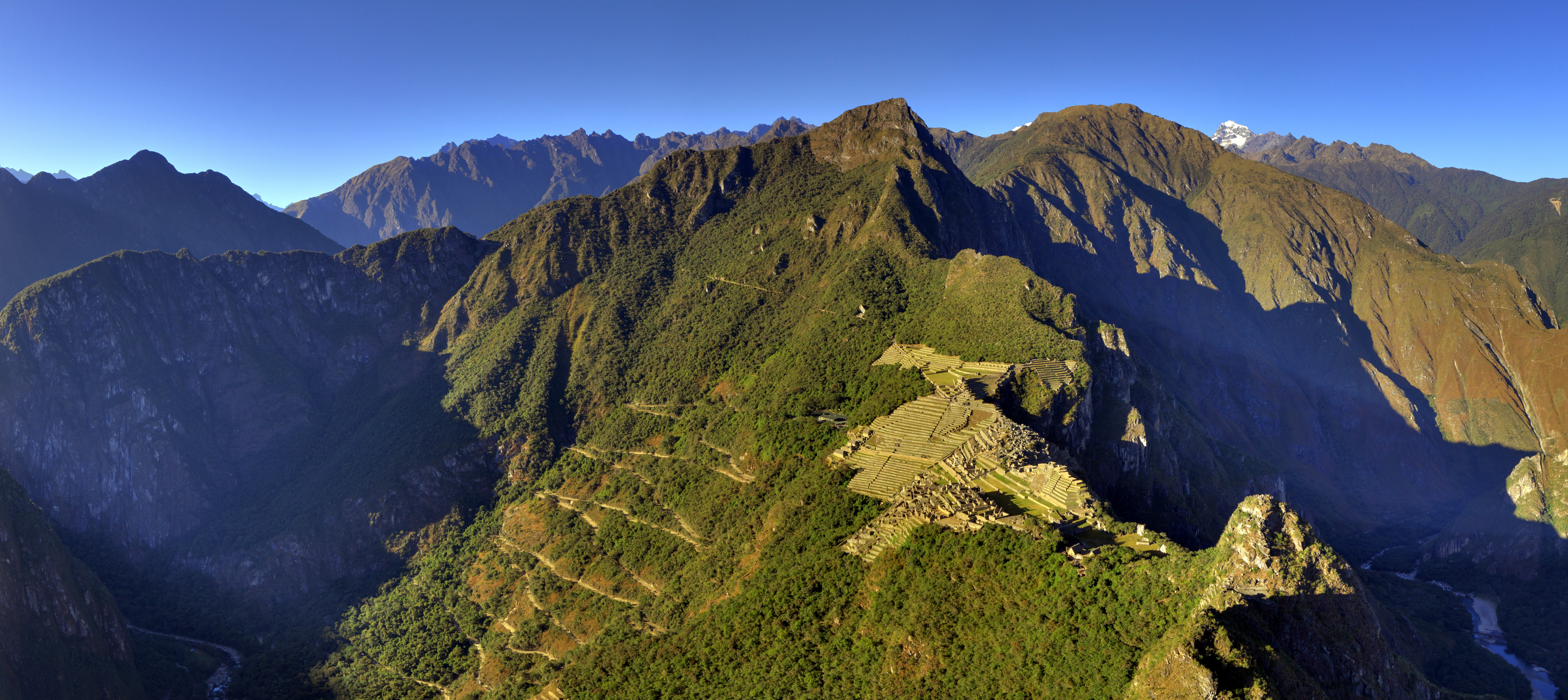
Machu Picchu as seen from Huayna Picchu

The city sits in a saddle between the two mountains, Machu Picchu and Huayna Picchu, with a view down two valleys and a nearly impassable mountain at its back. The bedrock is dominantly granite with smaller occurrences of granodiorite plus local dikes of peridotite and serpentine. The agricultural terraces, covering about 4.9 hectares (12 acres), complemented the site's architecture and protected against runoff and erosion. Constructed with stone retaining walls and well-drained topsoil, the terraces were built using deeper strata and stone chips to enhance drainage and ensure stability. At least ten Inka roads link the city with nearby monuments; the principal approach is through Inti Punku (Sun Gate), and another key route runs across the Inka Bridge to the Ahobamba basin and Llaqtapata. Contemporary accounts note local maintenance of these paths and their convergence on the site, which complicates interpretations of Machu Picchu as completely isolated.

Machu Picchu and other sites in the area are built over earthquake faults. According to research conducted in 2019, this may not be a coincidence: "[o]ne simple answer, researchers now suggest, is that that's [earthquake faults] where building materials for the site—large amounts of already fractured rock—were readily available."

=== Climate ===
Between the valley floor and the altitudinal zone of the Inca citadel, ranging from 2,200 metres (7,200 ft) to 2,500 metres (8,200 ft) meters above sea level, Machu Picchu features a subtropical highland climate, with an average annual precipitation of 2,010 millimetres (79 in) and an annual mean temperature of approximately 18 °C (64 °F). The site is characterized by steep slopes, dense vegetation, and significant rainfall, contributing to high humidity levels of 80–90%. The area is also frequently enveloped in cloud cover, typical of a cloud forest environment.

Climate data for Machu Picchu (elevation 2,399 m (7,871 ft), 1991–2020 normals)
| Month | Jan | Feb | Mar | Apr | May | Jun | Jul | Aug | Sep | Oct | Nov | Dec | Year |
|---|---|---|---|---|---|---|---|---|---|---|---|---|---|
| Mean daily maximum °C (°F) | 20.6 (69.1) | 20.6 (69.1) | 21.0 (69.8) | 21.5 (70.7) | 21.9 (71.4) | 22.0 (71.6) | 22.1 (71.8) | 23.1 (73.6) | 23.4 (74.1) | 22.8 (73.0) | 22.8 (73.0) | 21.2 (70.2) | 21.9 (71.5) |
| Mean daily minimum °C (°F) | 11.8 (53.2) | 11.9 (53.4) | 11.9 (53.4) | 11.7 (53.1) | 10.8 (51.4) | 10.0 (50.0) | 9.4 (48.9) | 10.0 (50.0) | 11.1 (52.0) | 11.5 (52.7) | 12.0 (53.6) | 12.0 (53.6) | 11.2 (52.1) |
| Average precipitation mm (inches) | 340.7 (13.41) | 324.5 (12.78) | 340.6 (13.41) | 184.1 (7.25) | 73.4 (2.89) | 50.8 (2.00) | 54.2 (2.13) | 60.6 (2.39) | 76.2 (3.00) | 163.0 (6.42) | 172.5 (6.79) | 275.4 (10.84) | 2,116 (83.31) |
Source: National Meteorology and Hydrology Service of Peru

== Site ==
=== Layout ===
Machu Picchu's main sectors Agricultural sector (terraces) Urban sector (buildings)

The site is divided into two main sectors: an agricultural sector to the southeast composed of terraces (andenes), and an urban sector to the northeast containing residences, places of worship, and warehouses. The urban sector is further split into an upper town (Hanan) and a lower town (Hurin).

The Hanan contains the Sacred Plaza (Plaza Sagrada), a courtyard complex incorporating the Main Temple and the Temple of the Three Windows and capped by a pyramid-like stone platform on which the Intihuatana stands. In contrast, the Hurin is marked by trapezoidal doorways and small rectangular kanchas, including three large, symmetrically arranged kanchas with housing and workshops overlooking the Main Square (Plaza Principal), and a large single-entrance building interpreted as an Acllahuasi; nearby is the Temple of the Condor, which includes ritual caves and a large carved stone often interpreted as a condor.

The architecture is adapted to the mountains. Approximately 200 buildings are arranged on wide parallel terraces around an east–west central square. The various compounds, called kanchas, are long and narrow in order to exploit the terrain. Sophisticated channeling systems provided irrigation for the fields. Stone stairways set in the walls allowed access to the different levels across the site. The eastern section of the city was probably residential. The western section, separated by the square, was for religious and ceremonial purposes. This section contains the Torreón, the massive tower which may have been used as an observatory.

Located in the urban sector are the primary archaeological treasures and tourist attractions: the Intihuatana, the Temple of the Sun, and the Temple of the Three Windows.

The Popular District, or Residential District, is the place where the lower-class people live. It includes storage buildings and simple houses. The Guardian's house is a three-sided building, with one of its long sides opening onto the Terrace of the Ceremonial Rock. The three-sided style of Inca architecture is known as the wayrona style. In 2005 and 2009, the University of Arkansas made detailed laser scans of the entire site and of the ruins at the top of the adjacent Huayna Picchu mountain. The scan data is available online for research purposes.

=== Sites of interest ===
==== Temple of the Sun or Torreón ====
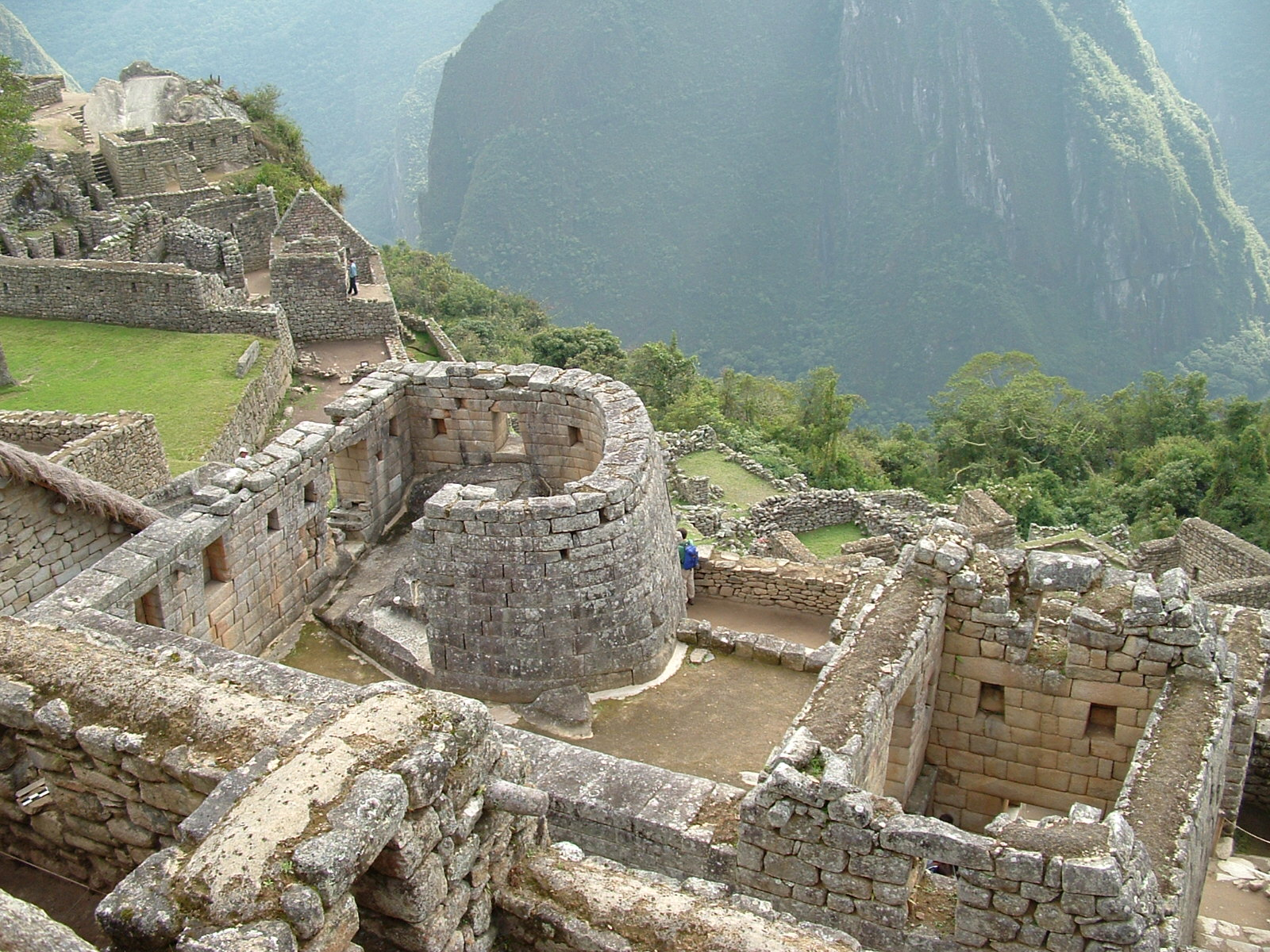
Temple of the Sun (Torreón), a two-part ashlar structure in the upper town, with carved platforms and solar-aligned openings

The Torreón is a semicircular, two-part structure built among the large granite blocks in the upper town (Hanan), within the urban sector of Machu Picchu. It occupies the rock overlying Bingham’s "Royal Mausoleum" and, like the Coricancha at Cusco and Pisac, has been described as having a "parabolic enclosure wall". The lower part fills an irregular, cave-like space between wedged boulders. It contains fine ashlar masonry with several trapezoidal niches; in some places, the natural rock was worked into stepped ledges and platforms. The upper part sits on an oblong, artificially shaped rock surrounded by some of the site’s finest ashlar. The rock's top is carved with steps and horizontal platforms and a Z-shaped edge commonly interpreted as an altar. The upper chamber’s wall contains embedded niches and a system of three openings (eastern, south-eastern, and northern); the eastern and south-eastern openings have stone pegs of uncertain function, and the northern opening is door-like but damaged. A trapezoidal opening known as the “Serpent’s Door” leads onto a small platform that overlooks a series of pools and affords a view of Huayna Picchu. Archaeoastronomical studies report that the openings create characteristic sunlight patterns and allow limited views of important star groups (for example the Pleiades); however, detailed 3D analyses indicate the Torreón was not a highly precise astronomical instrument but rather incorporated solar orientations for ritual and ceremonial purposes.

==== Intihuatana stone ====
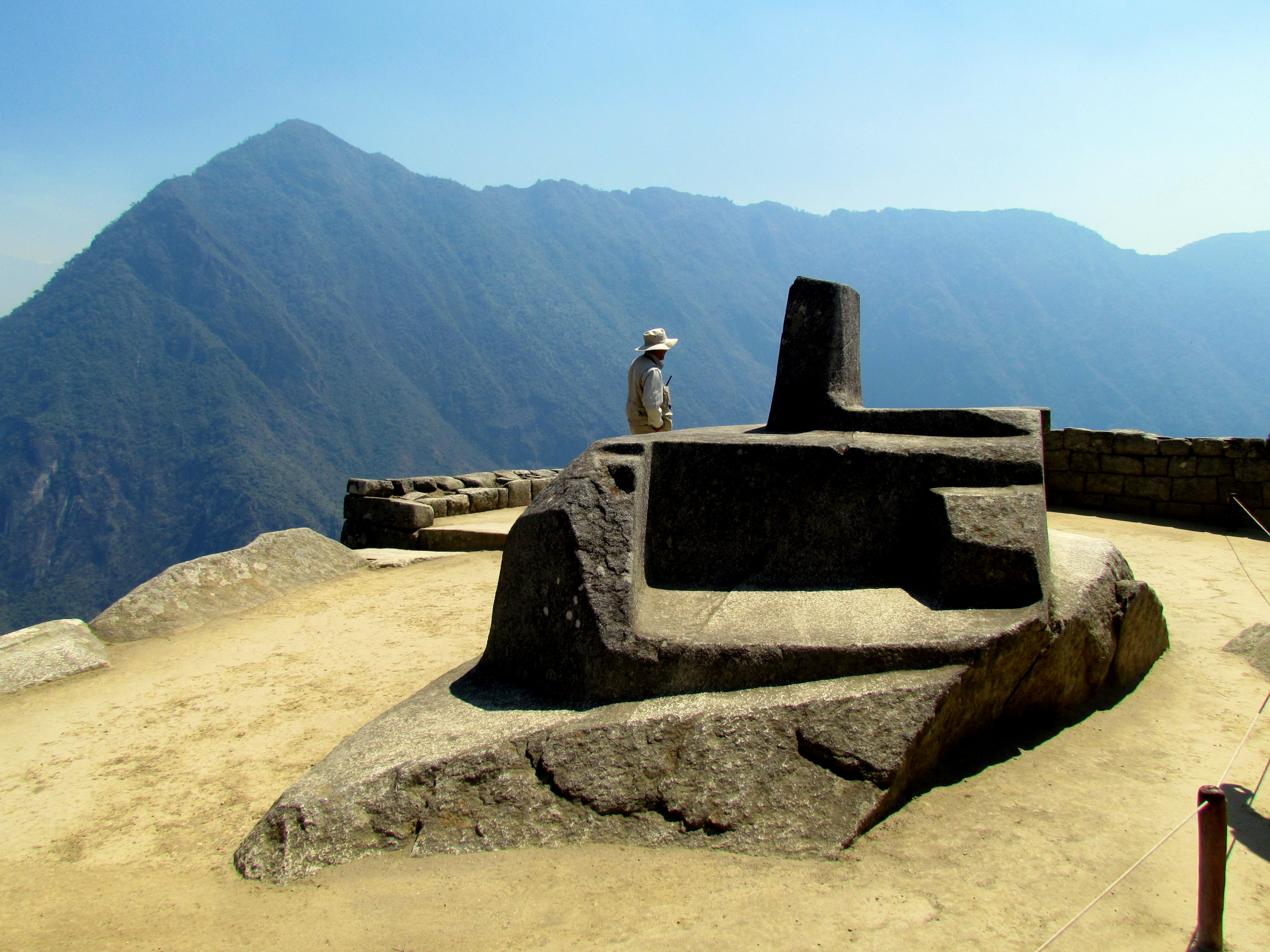
The Intihuatana stone aligns with solar events and sacred mountains; its function as a solar calendar remains debated.

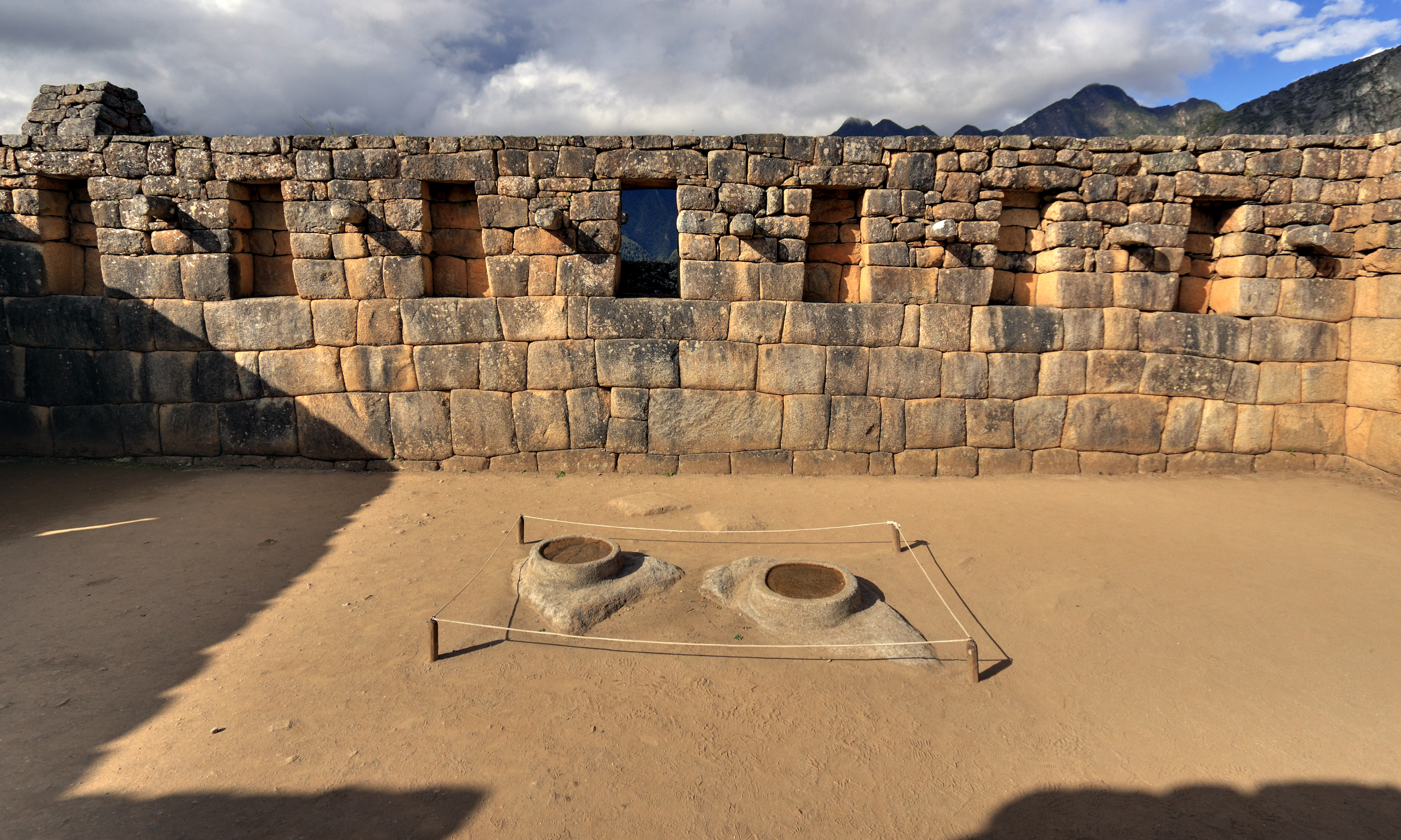
Rock-carved "mortars" in the Room of the Mortars. Once proposed as water mirrors for astronomical use, studies from 2022 have cast doubt on any calendrical function, and their original purpose remains uncertain.

Located on a terraced hill within the urban sector, the Intihuatana is a ritual stone which the Incas used. The stone is designed to point directly at the Sun during the winter solstice. The name of the stone, likely attributed by Bingham due to a similar monument in Pisac, comes from Quechua and means "place where the sun is tied". While its exact function is debated, scholars generally reject the popular idea that it served as a solar calendar gnomon. Instead, it may have been used for horizontal solar observations and was aligned with sacred mountains and cardinal directions. The stone is situated at 13°9'48" S. At midday on 11 November and 30 January, the Sun is situated almost exactly above the pillar, casting no shadow. On 21 June, the stone casts the longest shadow on its southern side, and on 21 December, a much shorter shadow on its northern side. Its placement may have held symbolic significance within a sacred landscape, aligning with prominent surrounding peaks such as Veronica, Salcantay, and Huayna Picchu.

==== Inti Mach'ay and the Royal Feast of the Sun ====
Inti Mach'ay is a special cave used to observe the Royal Feast of the Sun. This festival was celebrated during the Incan month of Qhapaq Raymi. It began earlier in the month and concluded on the December solstice. On this day, noble boys were initiated into manhood by an ear-piercing ritual as they stood inside the cave and watched the sunrise.

Architecturally, Inti Mach'ay is often considered to be one of the most significant structures at Machu Picchu. Its entrances, walls, steps, and windows display some of the finest masonry in the Inca Empire. The cave also includes a tunnel-like window unique among Incan structures, designed so that sunlight enters the interior only for a few days around the December solstice. This precise alignment suggests that Inti Mach'ay functioned as a solar observatory associated with the Capac Raymi festival. Inti Mach'ay is located on Machu Picchu's eastern side, just north of the "Condor Stone". Many of the caves surrounding this area were prehistorically used as tombs, yet there is no evidence that Mach'ay was a burial ground.

==== Temple of the Three Windows ====
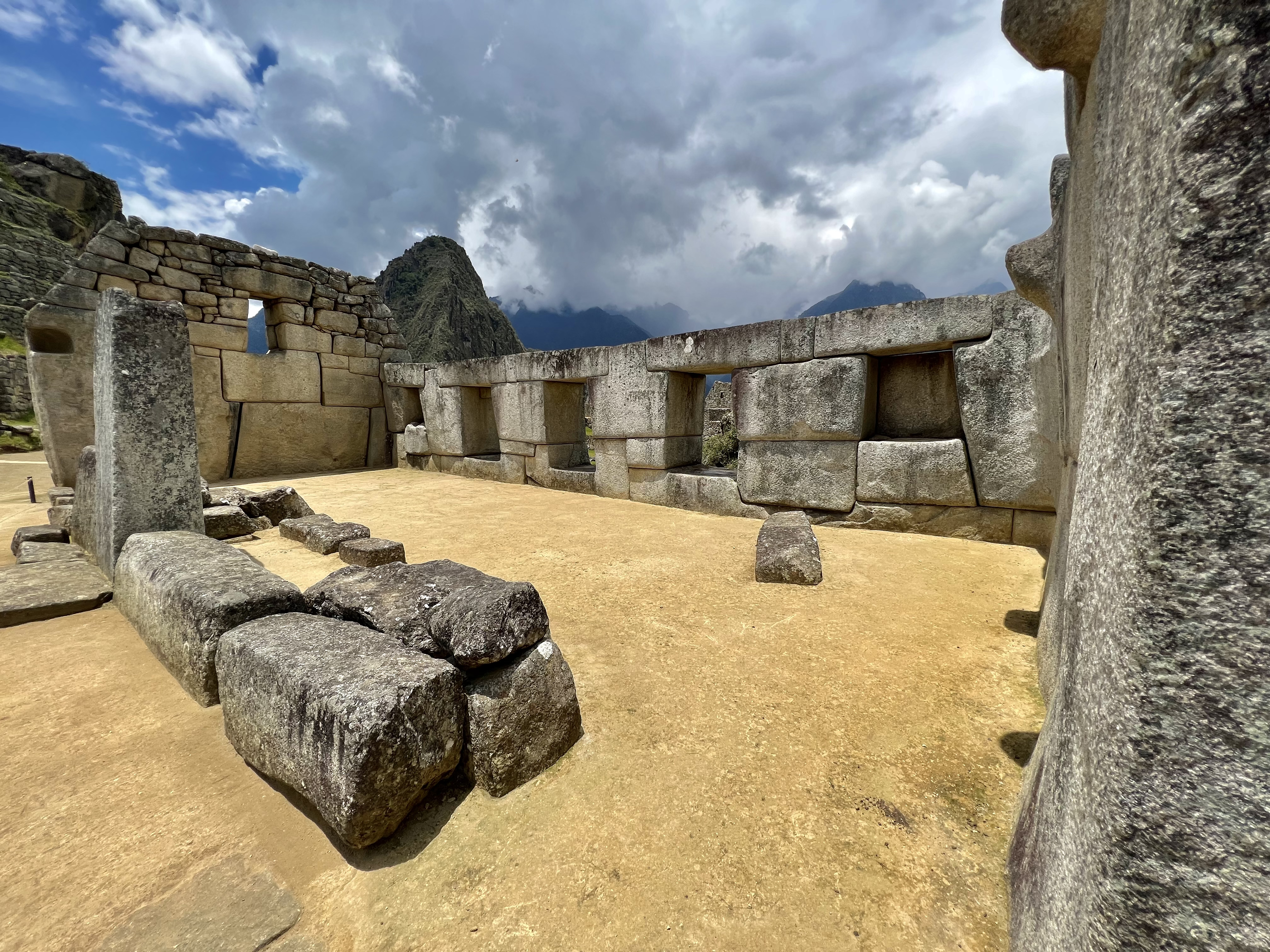
Interior of the Temple of the Three Windows, originally roofed and featuring the largest windows at Machu Pichu.

The Temple of the Three Windows stands on the eastern side of the Sacred Plaza, a 16 m (52 ft) × 16 m (52 ft) terrace at the heart of Machu Picchu's urban sector. Its single trapezoidal wall is constructed of large, finely worked white granite blocks whose joints display helical planes unique in the site's masonry.

This wall contains three oversized trapezoidal openings, dints and jambs each carved from single stones, flanked by two smaller niches. Four terraces at the base of the wall retain the platform on its exterior face.

From within the temple, one can observe both sunrise and sunset across the ruins and surrounding mountains. Evidence suggests it was originally roofed by a three‑wall timber truss system resting on wooden beams and pilasters set into side pockets in the masonry.

During his 1911 visit, Hiram Bingham recorded a charcoal inscription on the central window reading "Lizárraga 1902", left by Agustín Lizárraga. The graffiti appears in Bingham's early photographs, published in The Geographical Journal (December 1911) and National Geographic Magazine (April 1912), indicating prior local knowledge and clearing of the site.

=== Construction ===
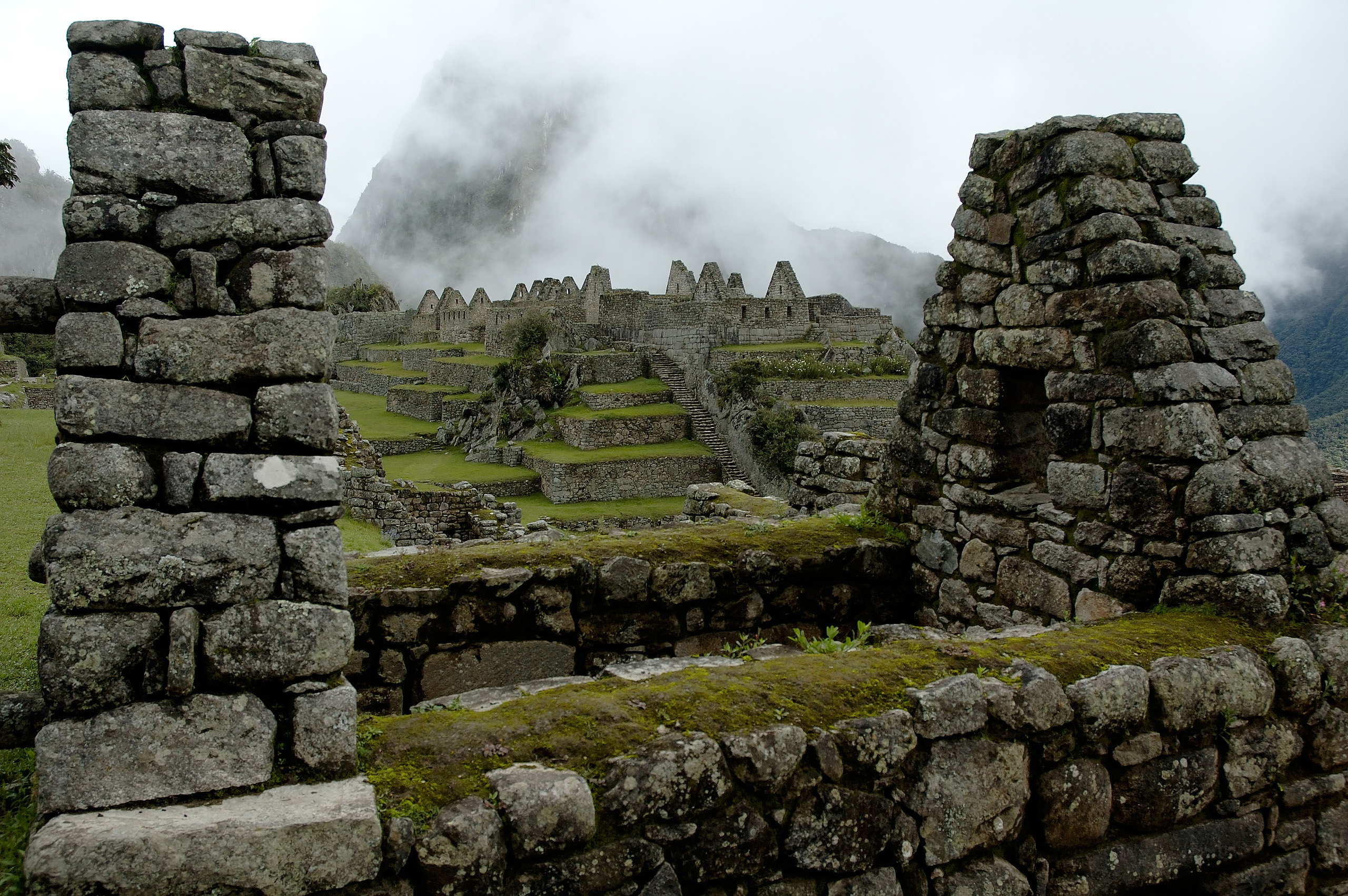
Residential section with closely joined stones typical of Inca dry masonry

The central buildings of Machu Picchu are built in classical Inca dry masonry, with large blocks precisely shaped through quarrying, stone-cutting, and stone-dressing, then fitted together without mortar.

The site may have been intentionally built on fault lines to provide natural drainage and a source of fractured stone for construction. According to geologist Rualdo Menegat, Machu Picchu "shows us that the Incan civilization was an empire of fractured rocks."

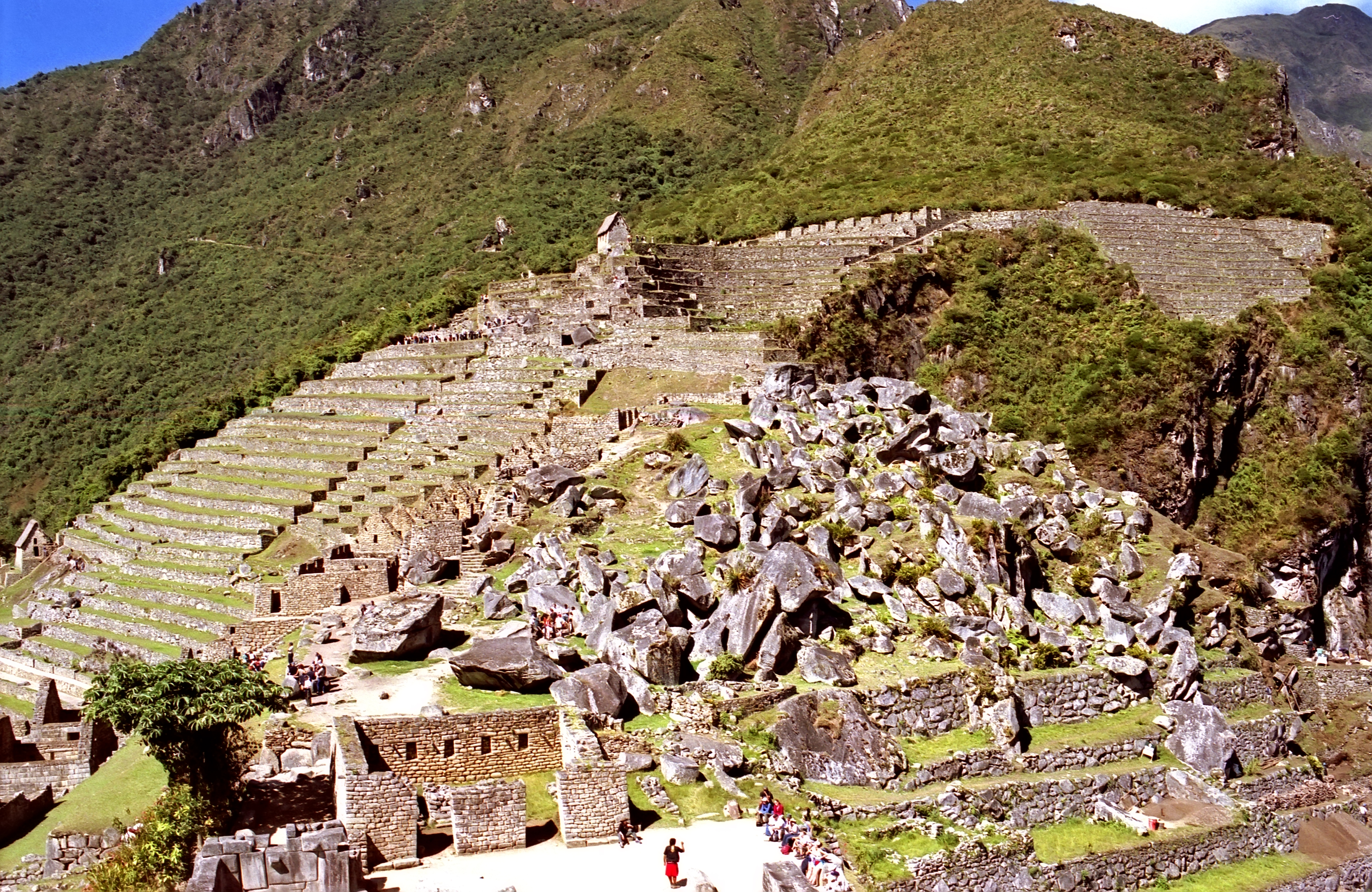
Inca quarry at Machu Picchu, where large irregular granite blocks from a natural granitic chaos were used as building stone.

The section of the mountain where Machu Picchu was built provided various challenges that the Incas solved with local materials. One issue was the seismic activity due to two fault lines, which made mortar and similar building methods nearly useless. Instead, the Inca mined stones from some quarries at the site, including one identified in 2023 using remote sensing techniques, which was probably located in the catchment area between the Hurin and Hanan before it was covered over to create the current Plaza Principal. Once mined, the Inca lined the granite stones up and shaped them to fit together perfectly, stabilizing the structures. Inca walls have many stabilizing features: doors and windows are trapezoidal, narrowing from bottom to top; corners are usually rounded; inside corners often incline slightly into the rooms, and L-shaped blocks are often tied together outside corners; walls are offset slightly from row to row rather than rising straight from bottom to top.

Heavy rainfall required terraces to drain rainwater and prevent mudslides, landslides, erosion, and flooding. Terraces were layered with stone chips, sand, dirt, and topsoil to absorb water and prevent it from running down the mountain. Similar layering protected the large city center from flooding. Multiple canals and reserves throughout the city provided water that could be supplied to the terraces for irrigation and to prevent erosion and flooding.

The approach to moving and placing the enormous stones remains uncertain, probably involving hundreds of men to push the stones up inclines. A few stones have knobs that could have been used to lever them into position; the knobs were generally sanded away, with a few overlooked. For larger stones, the Incas likely employed ramps with gentle inclines, along with wooden rollers, levers, and ropes made from maguey fibers. Most stones were moved from higher to lower elevations, but some, like those at Ollantaytambo, were transported over long distances.

=== Transportation ===
Machu Picchu was connected to the Inca road system and long-distance trade, as shown by obsidian nodules found near the site’s entrance. Analyses by Burger and Asaro in the 1970s traced them to the Titicaca or Chivay sources, indicating extensive pre-Hispanic exchange networks.

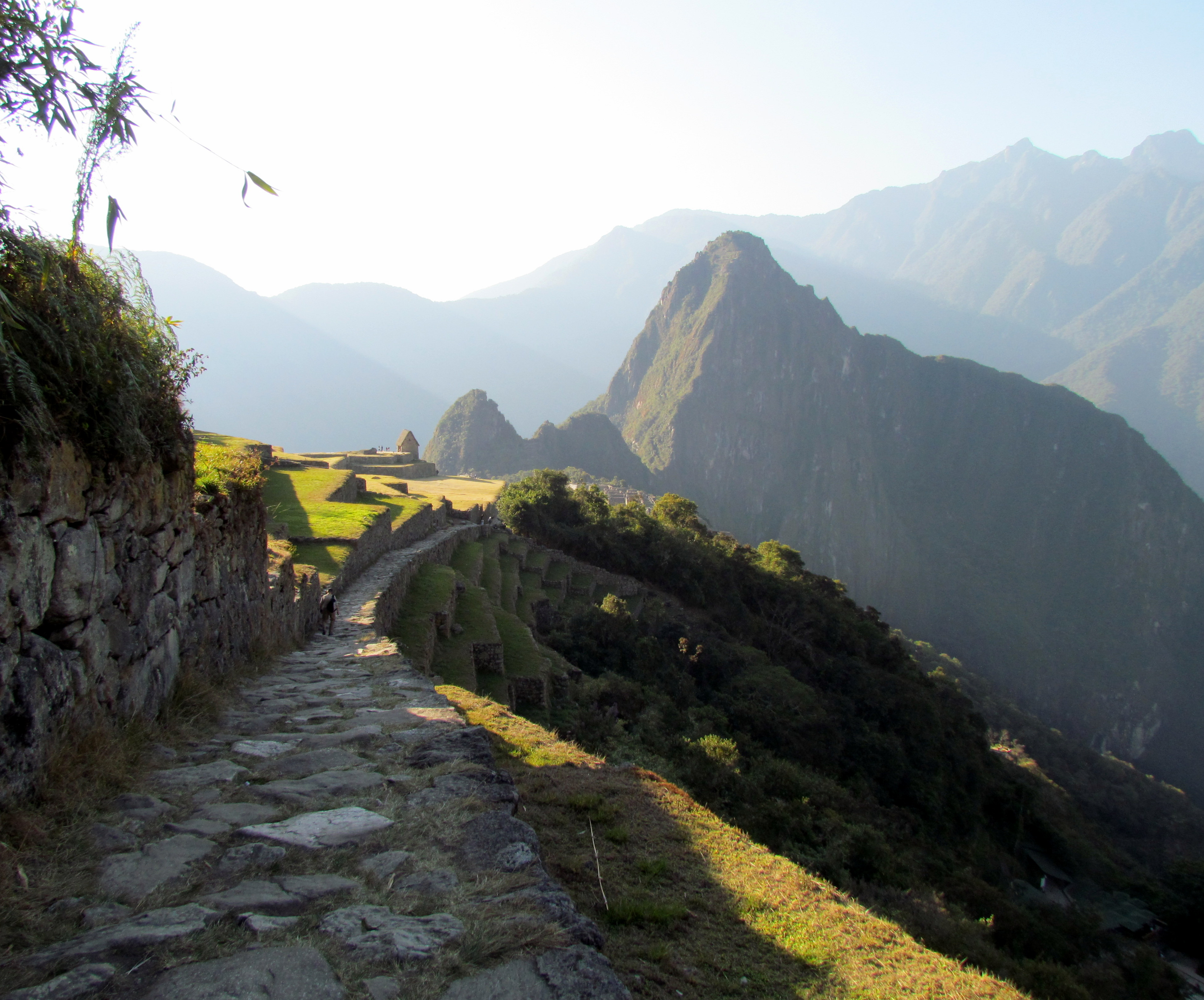
Machu Picchu as seen from the Inca Trail, one of the site's three principal access routes

Today, visitors can reach Machu Picchu via three main routes. The most popular option is the train journey from Cusco or Ollantaytambo. Operated by PeruRail and Inca Rail, this route takes visitors to the town of Aguas Calientes, from where they can take a bus ride of 8.6 kilometres (5.3 mi) or walk to the Machu Picchu entrance.

Another widely chosen route is the Inca Trail, a historic path built by the Incas considered "the most famous hike in South America" by Lonely Planet, attracting thousands of tourists each year. The trail begins at either Piscacucho (Km 82 on the railway to Aguas Calientes) or Q'oriwayrachina (Km 104), and, depending on the starting point, spans up to approximately 42.5 kilometres (26.4 mi), reaching an altitude of 4,200 metres (13,800 ft) at Warmi Wañusqa. It passes through the Andes and various archaeological sites before reaching the Inti Punku at Machu Picchu. Due to limited permits, booking through a tourism agency is required.

Alternatively, travelers can take a less conventional route that involves traveling by road to a point near the Hydroelectric station. From there, they can either walk or take a short train ride to Aguas Calientes. This option is generally more affordable and does not require booking, but it is less recommended during the rainy season due to potential landslide risks.

As of November 2024, the construction of a new paved roadway right to the doorstep of the historic site is in progress and due for completion in 2025. The path, otherwise known as the Santa María-Santa Teresa-Machu Picchu Hydroelectric Bridge highway, involves 28.41 kilometers (22 miles) of asphalt-paved roads that would generally reduce access time to the heritage site from 4 or 5 hours to 2 hours.

== In popular culture ==
Machu Picchu has appeared in several films, television programmes and music productions. The Paramount Pictures film Secret of the Incas (1954), starring Charlton Heston and Yma Sumac, was filmed on location at Machu Picchu and Cusco, marking the first time a major Hollywood studio shot on site. Werner Herzog's drama Aguirre, the Wrath of God (1972) opens with scenes shot in the Machu Picchu area and on the stone stairway of Huayna Picchu. The site features prominently in the biopic The Motorcycle Diaries (2004), based on Che Guevara's 1952 travel memoir, and in the NOVA television documentary "Ghosts of Machu Picchu". The site also appears briefly in The Simpsons episode "Lost Verizon" (2008). Contemporary appearances include the footage of Machu Picchu in multimedia artist Kimsooja's Thread Routes series (2010) and the blockbuster Transformers: Rise of the Beasts (2023), which filmed sequences at Machu Picchu and other Cusco sites. The song "Kilimanjaro" from the Indian Tamil‑language film Enthiran (2010) was also filmed at Machu Picchu.

== See also ==
- Iperú, tourist information and assistance
- Lares trek, an alternative route to that of the Inca Trail
- List of archaeological sites in Peru
- List of archaeoastronomical sites by country
- List of World Heritage Sites in Peru
- List of highest settlements
- Paleohydrology
- Putucusi, neighboring mountain
- Religion in the Inca Empire
- Salcantay Trek – alternative trek to Machu Picchu
- Tourism in Peru
