= Historic Sanctuary of Machu Picchu =

Machu Picchu
- Santuario Histórico de Machupicchu
- IUCN category III (natural monument or feature)
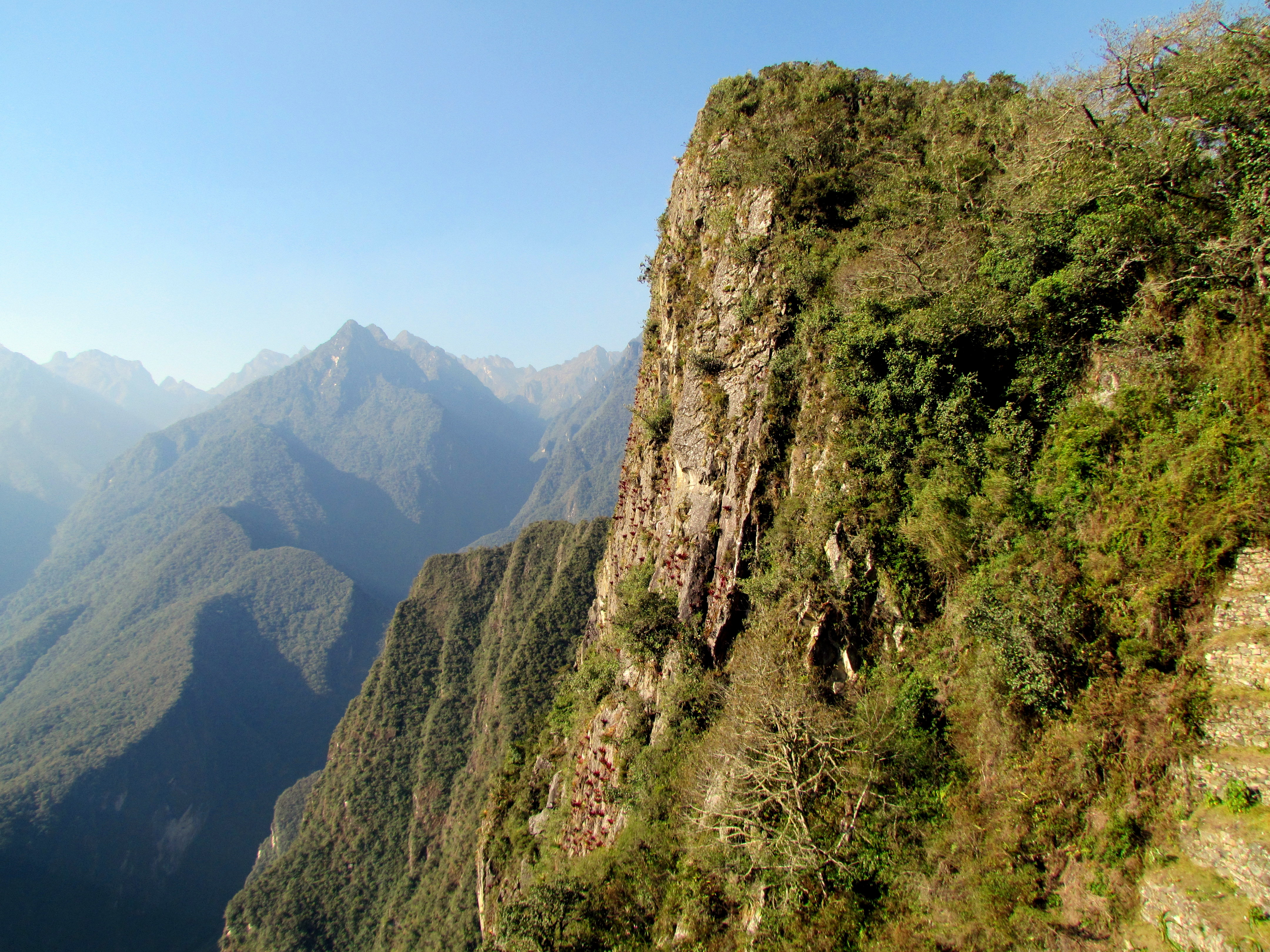
- View from the Sun Gate on the Inca Trail to Machu Picchu.

- Location within Peru
- Location: Machu Picchu District, Urubamba Province, Cusco Region
- Nearest city: Cusco, Cusco
- Coordinates: 13°12′10″S 72°33′19″W
- Area: 32,592 ha (80,540 acres)
- Established: January 8, 1981
- Visitors: 423,803 (in 2019)
- Governing body: SERNANP

UNESCO World Heritage Site
- Official name: Historic Sanctuary of Machu Picchu
- Location: Latin America and the Caribbean
- Criteria: Mixed: i, iii, vii, ix
- Reference: 274
- Inscription: 1983 (7th Session)
- Area: 38,160.87 ha (94,297.6 acres)

The Historic Sanctuary of Machu Picchu is a protected area in Peru covering over 35,000 hectares. It includes the natural environment surrounding the Machu Picchu archaeological site, located in the rugged cloud forest of the Yungas on the eastern slope of the Peruvian Andes and along both banks of the Urubamba River, which flows northwest in this section.

This unique protected area encompasses one of the most extraordinary altitudinal transects in Peru, spanning only about twenty kilometers and protecting diverse ecosystems ranging from eternal snows at over 4,000 meters above sea level to tropical rainforests just over 1,700 meters above sea level.

== Conservation objectives ==
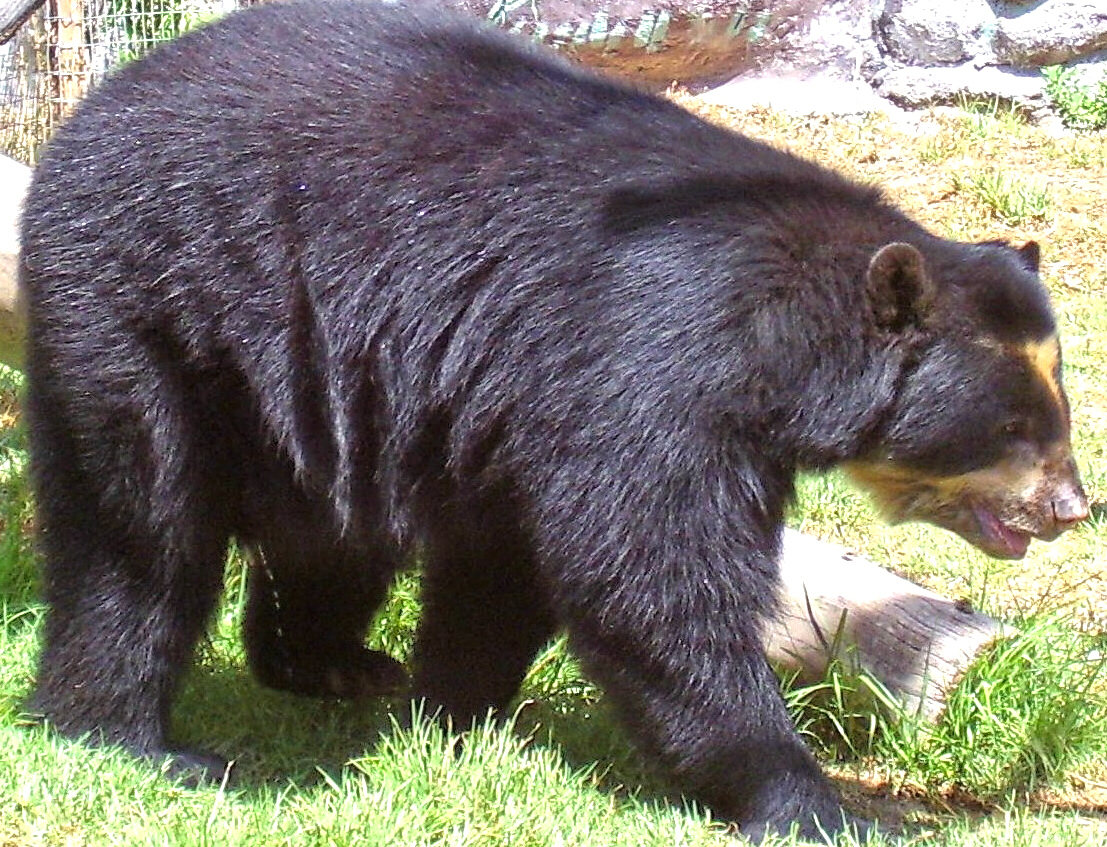
Andean bear.

- To protect the Inca citadel of Machu Picchu, a complex of archaeological sites linked by the Inca Trail and other testimonies of Andean culture.
- To conserve the spectacular landscape and the natural habitat of important species of flora and fauna that are vulnerable or endangered.

The Machu Picchu Historical Sanctuary - National Archaeological Park Machu Picchu is considered one of the areas with the highest biodiversity in Peru, featuring 24 ecosystems ranging from montane wet forests at 1,900 meters above sea level to snow-capped peaks over 6,000 meters above sea level. Its rugged geography supports habitats ideal for wildlife, including 75 mammal species, 444 bird species, 14 amphibians, 24 reptiles, and 377 butterflies; as well as 423 orchid species and 332 tree species, including the q’euña, intimpa, cedar, alder, pisonay, unka, and tara. Key endangered species include the Andean bear or ukumari, the highland quetzal, and the cock-of-the-rock, as well as the orchids wacanki (Masdevallia veitchiana) and wiñay wayna (Epidendrum secundum), names in Quechua meaning "forever young".

== Geography ==
While most eastern slopes of the Andes incline more or less directly toward the lowlands, the area between Paucartambo and the Ene and Apurímac rivers is a great fan of mountain ridges separated by deep valleys. Machu Picchu, one of these ridges, overlooks the deep Urubamba Valley framed by the imposing Vilcanota and Vilcabamba Ranges (both with peaks above 5,700 meters above sea level).

From the air, the Sanctuary appears as a large book opened in half, with the turbulent Urubamba River in its central part and two major mountain chains plunging on both sides of a deep valley covered by vegetation.

On either side of the river, the boundaries of this natural area comprehensively protect entire sections of two of the region's most important sub-basins: to the north, the Urubamba Range, and to the south, the Vilcabamba Range. The boundaries also include two of its most important summits: Nevado Verónica (5,682 meters above sea level) and the majestic Salkantay (6,271 meters above sea level), considered the Apu or tutelary deity of the region. The Sanctuary's boundaries are completed by the Cusichaca and Acobamba valleys to the east and west, respectively.

== Climate ==
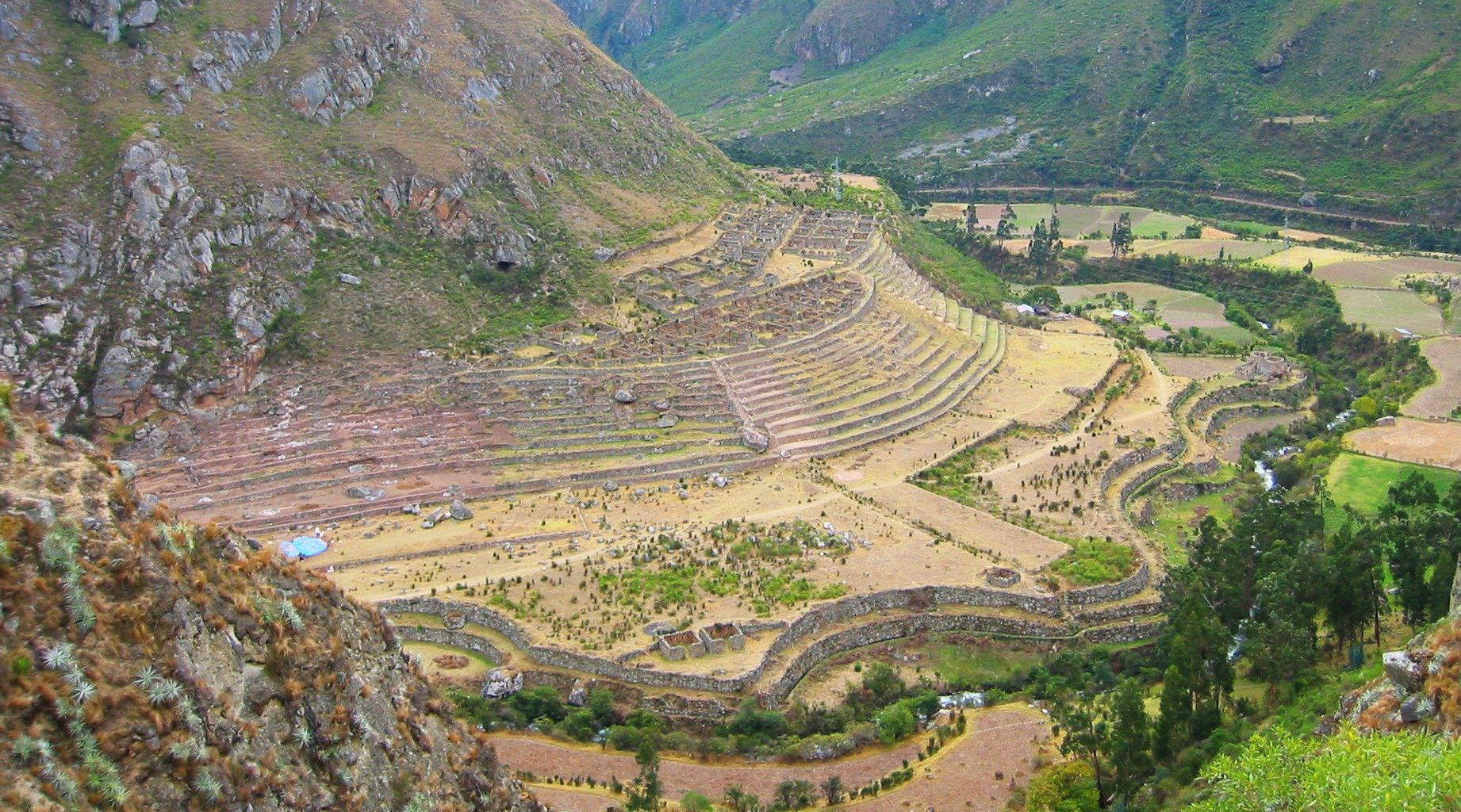
Llactapata, ruins of an ancient Inca settlement with civil buildings and agricultural terraces on the banks of the Urubamba River, at the southern end of the Sanctuary.

Due to its geographic and topographic characteristics, the Machu Picchu Sanctuary presents climatic variations, with peaks reaching 6,270 meters above sea level where temperatures are extremely cold and lower areas around 2,000 meters above sea level with milder temperatures. Meteorological satellite data shows that mountain ridges offer efficient protection against the impact of cold polar winds ("friajes"). These winds, frequent as brief periods of cold winter in the southern tropics, with hail and snow on the Andean slopes, may have been a major factor in changing vegetation in South America during glacial periods. Across the tropical Andes, higher concentrations of endemic bird species correspond to ecologically predictable locations. This suggests that endemic species may represent population remnants that could survive periods of climatic instability only in well-protected places.

Temperatures in Machu Picchu vary between high altitudes and valley floors, although overall, the climate in this sector is mild, with typically subtropical characteristics: warm and humid during the day and cool at night. Temperatures range from 8 °C to 22 °C, with minimums of 8 °C to 11.2 °C and maximums around 20 °C to 22.2 °C.
