= Llaqtapata =

Archaeological site in Peru

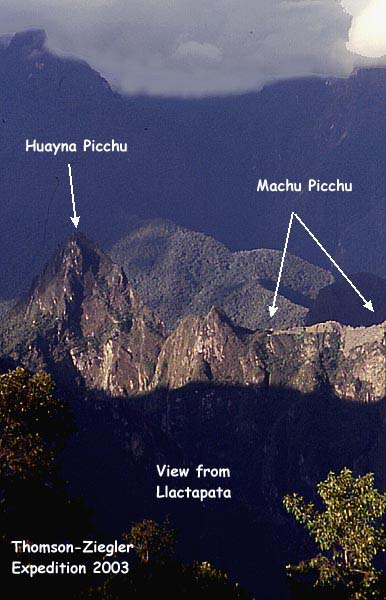
- View of Machu Picchu from Llaqtapata

- Location within Peru
- 13°11′9.2″S 72°35′5.1″W
- Cultures: Inca
- Location: Peru, Cusco Region, La Convención Province, Santa Teresa District
- Region: Andes

Llaqtapata (Quechua) llaqta place (village, town, city, country, nation), pata elevated place / above, at the top / edge, bank (of a river), shore, pronounced 'yakta-pahta', Hispanicized Llactapata) is an archaeological site about 5 km (3.1 mi) west of Machu Picchu. The complex is located in the Cusco Region, La Convención Province, Santa Teresa District, high on a ridge between the Ahobamba and Santa Teresa drainages.

== Discovery and mapping ==
It appears to be the site originally reported by Hiram Bingham as having this name. Although the site was little explored by Bingham, it was more extensively explored and mapped by the Thomson and Ziegler expedition of 2003.

Bingham first discovered Llaqtapata in 1912. "We found evidence that some Inca chieftain had built his home here and had included in the plan ten or a dozen buildings." Bingham locates the site "on top of a ridge between the valleys of the Aobamba and the Salcantay, about 5,000 feet above the estate of Huaquina." "Here we discovered a number of ruins and two or three modern huts. The Indians said that the place was called Llacta Pata." Bingham did not investigate the ruins thoroughly, however, and they were not studied again for another 70 years.

== Role as a roadside shrine ==
A mid-2003 study of the site conducted by Hugh Thomson and Gary Ziegler concluded that the location of Llaqtapata along the Inca trail suggested that it was an important rest stop and roadside shrine on the journey to Machu Picchu. This and subsequent investigations have revealed an extensive complex of structures and features related to and connected with Machu Picchu by a continuation of the Inca Trail leading onward into the Vilcabamba. Llaqtapata may have been a member of the network of interrelated administrative and ceremonial sites which supported the regional center at Machu Picchu. It probably played an important astronomical function during the solstices and equinoxes.
