= National Service of Natural Protected Areas =

Government agency in Peru

National Service of Natural Protected Areas by the State
- Servicio Nacional de Áreas Naturales Protegidas por el Estado (SERNANP)
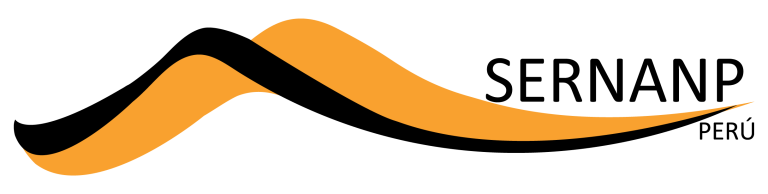

Agency overview
- Formed: May 13, 2008; 18 years ago
- Preceding agency: National Institute of Natural Resources (formed November 27, 1992; 33 years ago)
- Jurisdiction: Peru
- Headquarters: Av. José Galvez Barrenechea N° 696, San Isidro, Lima
- Employees: 1420 (2025)
- Annual budget: S/116.2 million (FY 2024)
- Agency executive: José Carlos Nieto Navarrete, Head
- Parent department: Ministry of Environment
- Website: www.gob.pe/sernanp

Map

The National Service of Natural Protected Areas by the State (Spanish: Servicio Nacional de Áreas Naturales Protegidas por el Estado; SERNANP) is the public agency of the Peruvian State responsible for the direction, management and conservation of the National System of Protected Natural Areas by the State (SINANPE). SERNANP is affiliated with the Ministry of the Environment. It was created by Legislative Decree No. 1013 in May 2008, replacing the former National Institute of Natural Resources (INRENA), which had been established in November 1992 under the Ministry of Agricultural Development and Irrigation.

== History ==
The agency traces its roots to the creation of INRENA in November 1992, tasked with the sustainable management of Peru's natural resources. In response to growing international commitments under the Convention on Biological Diversity and to strengthen legal protection of natural areas, the Peruvian Government enacted the Legislative Decree No. 1013 establishing SERNANP in May 2008. A 2023 report by the Conservation Strategy Fund highlighted SERNANP's reform as a model for technical capacity building in Latin American protected-area governance. In 2024, the Environmental Investigation Agency documented civil-society opposition to a proposed merger of SERNANP with other ministries, underscoring its perceived independence and effectiveness.

== Responsibilities ==
SERNANP oversees the planning, regulation, and protection of areas within SINANPE. Its functions include:

- Establishing policies and technical criteria for protected area management;
- Directing SINANPE and coordinating with national, regional, and local governments;
- Authorizing regulated activities and enforcing compliance through administrative sanctions;
- Supporting subnational and private conservation efforts, and promoting financial sustainability.

The agency also works with international networks to improve climate resilience and biodiversity conservation, and has been recognized as a technical partner by the UN Climate Technology Centre & Network.

== Biodiversity and impact ==
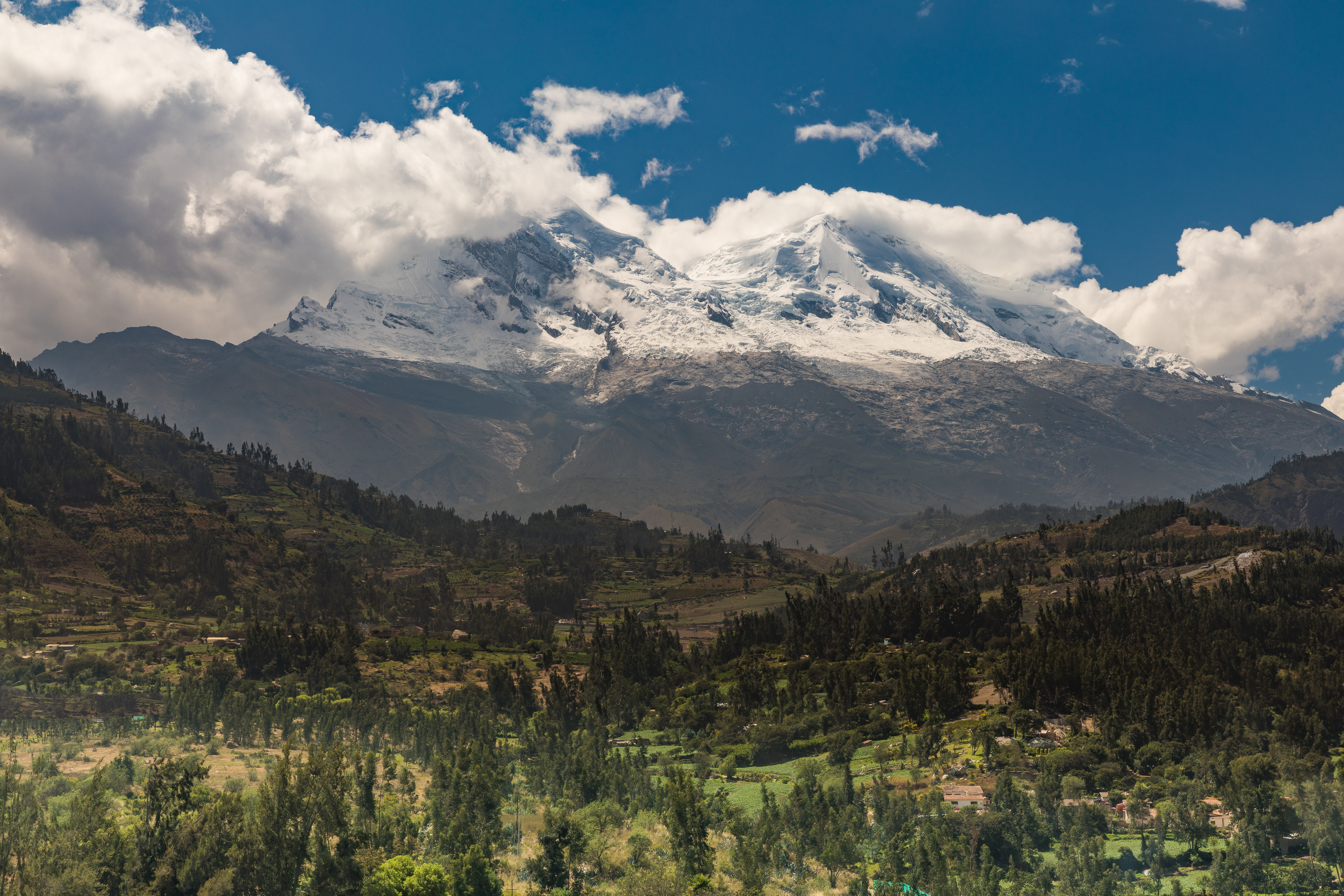
Huascarán National Park, one of the most visited national parks in Peru

As of 2024, SERNANP administers 246 protected areas, covering approximately 17.9% of Peru's national territory, including both terrestrial and marine ecosystems. These include emblematic sites such as the Historic Sanctuary of Machu Picchu, Manu National Park, and Huascarán National Park, many of which are recognized by UNESCO as World Heritage Sites or Biosphere Reserves.

Scientific studies have found that areas managed by SERNANP are moderately effective at reducing deforestation compared to surrounding unprotected lands, contributing to biodiversity conservation in the Peruvian Amazon. In addition, SERNANP's long-term monitoring and research support contributed to Peru ranking first globally in bird diversity in 2024, with 1,879 species identified.

Despite these achievements, the agency faces persistent challenges. In 2025, controversies emerged over industrial fishing within marine reserves, particularly in the Paracas National Reserve, prompting legal disputes regarding the enforcement of protected status.

== Visitation ==
SERNANP recorded over 2.1 million recreational visits to protected areas in 2022, reflecting a significant increase from 2021 as tourism rebounded after the COVID-19 pandemic. Among the most visited sites were coastal reserves, historical sanctuaries, and iconic national parks such as Paracas, Huascarán, and Machu Picchu. The following table lists the most visited areas in 2021 and 2022: (Note: Rankings reflect recorded recreational visits by SERNANP. Total visits for all protected areas surpassed 2 million in 2022, with most growth occurring in culturally significant and coastal sites)

| Protected Area | Rank (2021) | Visits (2021) | Rank (2022) | Visits (2022) |
|---|---|---|---|---|
| Guano Islands, Islets, and Capes National Reserve | 1 | 369,111 | 2 | 474,722 |
| Paracas National Reserve | 2 | 281,850 | 1 | 524,004 |
| Huascarán National Park | 3 | 222,107 | 3 | 256,303 |
| Pampas de Ayacucho Historic Sanctuary | 4 | 153,269 | 4 | 217,058 |
| Tingo María National Park | 5 | 118,599 | 5 | 147,922 |
| Lachay National Reserve | 6 | 80,484 | 10 | 30,951 |
| Historic Sanctuary of Machu Picchu | 7 | 80,436 | 6 | 254,855 |
| Pantanos de Villa Wildlife Refuge | 8 | 28,745 | 8 | 37,507 |
| Huayllay National Sanctuary | 9 | 25,961 | 7 | 52,118 |
| Tambopata National Reserve | 10 | 18,618 | 9 | 56,349 |

== See also ==
- Protected areas of Peru
- List of World Heritage Sites in Peru
