= Intihuatana, Urubamba =

Archaeological site in Peru

Coordinates: 13.1651°S 72.5455°W

Intihuatana
- Hitching post of the Sun
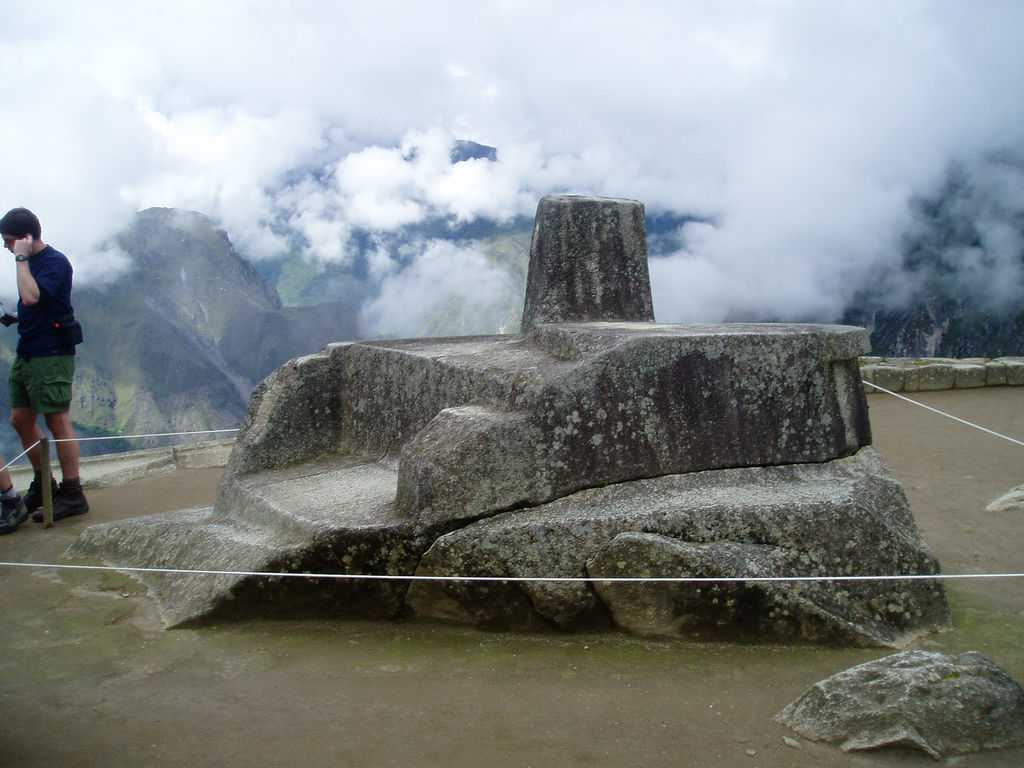
- Intihuatana

- Location in Peru
- Cultures: pre-Inca ("megalithic"); Inca
- Associated with: up to 800 at peak
- Location: Peru
- Region: Cusco Region, Urubamba Province

History
- Built: c. 1450
- Abandoned: ~ 1535

Intihuatana (possibly from in the Quechua spelling Inti Watana or Intiwatana), at the archaeological site of Machu Picchu, is a notable ritual stone associated with the astronomic clock or calendar of the Inca in South America. Machu Picchu was thought to have been built c. 1450 by the Sapa Inca Pachacuti as a country estate. In the late 16th century, the Viceroy Francisco de Toledo and the clergy destroyed those Intihuatana which they could find. They did so as they believed that the Incas' religion was a blasphemy and the religious significance of the Intihuatana could be a political liability. The Intihuatana of Machu Picchu was found intact by Bingham in 1911, indicating that the Spanish conquerors had not found it. Intihuatana was damaged on September 8, 2000 when a crane being used in an ad shoot toppled over and chipped off a piece of the granite.

== Design ==
The Intihuatana of Machu Picchu was carved directly into the bedrock of the mountain's summit area. It is characterized by complex surfaces, planes and angles whose purpose at this time is unknown. Featuring a slightly inclined plane at its top, an upright stone column tilts 13 degrees northward.

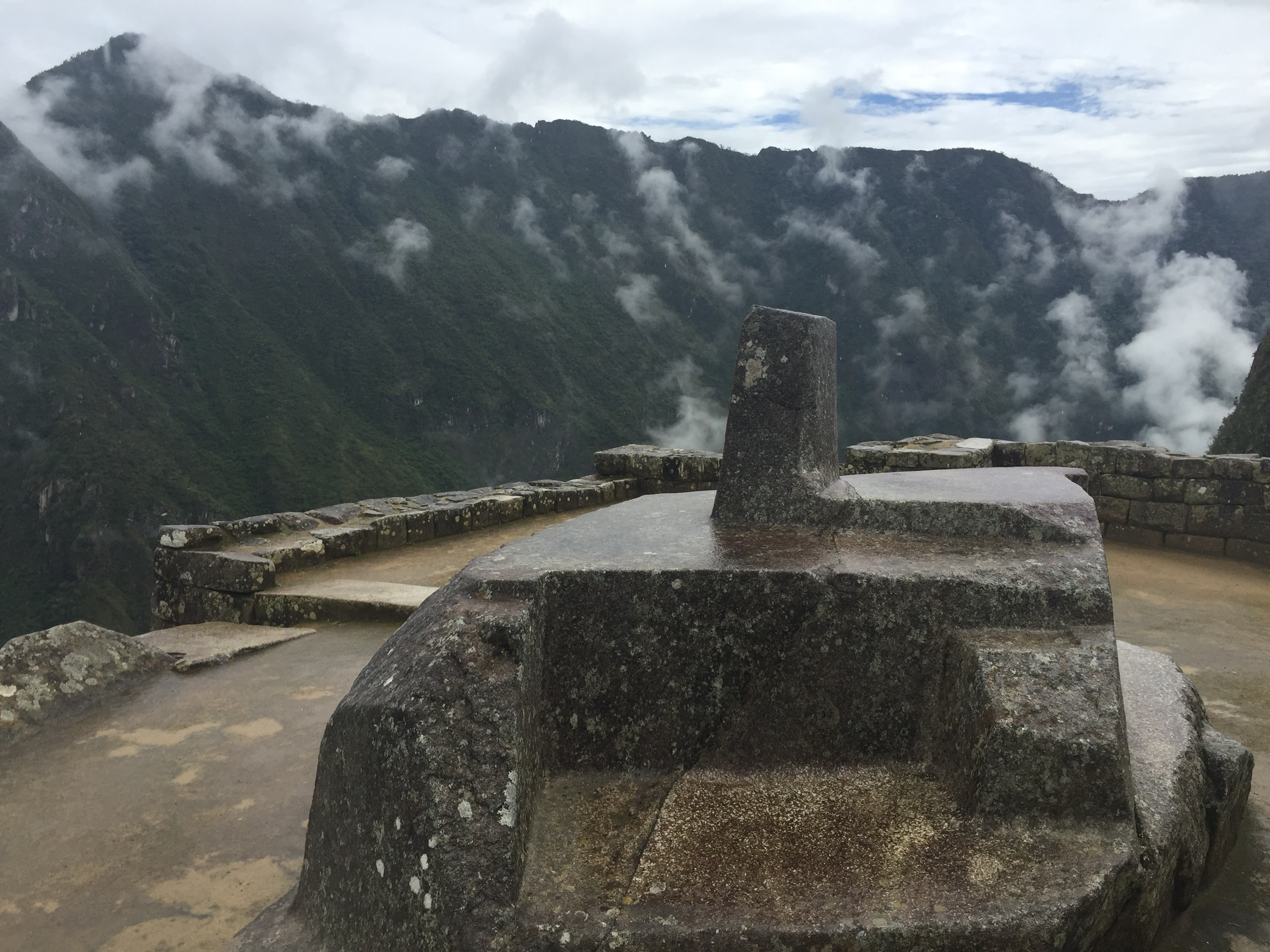
Intihuatana

== Function ==
Possibly used as a sundial, it was aligned with the sun's position during the winter solstice. The Inca believed the stone held the sun in its place along its annual path in the sky. At midday on the equinoxes the sun stands almost above the pillar, casting no shadow at all. At midday on 11 November and 30 January, the sun stands almost exactly above the pillar, casting no shadow. On June 21, the stone is casting the longest shadow on its southern side and on December 21, a much shorter one on its northern side. The base is said to be "in the shape of a map of the Inca Empire" but most archaeologists disagree, observing that the base is squat and stubby whereas the Tawantinsuyu is long and thin. Pedro Sueldo Nava describes the landmark as "perhaps one of the most beautiful and enigmatic places to be found in Machu Picchu."

== See also ==
- Inti, the ancient Incan sun god
- Kusichaka River
- Machu Q'inti
- Pakaymayu
- Phutuq K'usi
- Wayna Pikchu
- Wayna Q'inti
- Sallqantay
- Machu Picchu - Wikipedia
