= Cochapata =

Archaeological site in Peru

- Interactive map of Cochapata
- Cultures: Inca
- Location: Peru; La Convención Province, Cusco Region

Cochapata or Qochapata (possibly from Quechua qucha lake, pata elevated place, riverbank, shore) is an archaeological site in Peru. It is located in the district of Huayopata, La Convención Province, Cusco.

== See also ==
- Allpamayu
- Inka Tampu
- Lucumayo River
- Huamanmarca
- Veronica
