= Inti Watana =

Inti Watana (Quechua, Hispanicized spelling Intihuatana) may refer to:

- Intihuatana, a ritual stone in South America associated with the Incan calendar
- Inti Watana, Ayacucho, an archaeological site in the Vilcas Huamán Province, Ayacucho Region, Peru
- Inti Watana, Calca, an archaeological site in the Pisac District, Calca Province, Cusco Region, Peru
- Inti Watana, Urubamba, an archaeological site in the Machupicchu District, Urubamba Province, Cusco Region, Peru
- Inti Watana II and III, also known as Usqunta I and II, an archaeological sites in the Lucanas Province, Ayacucho Region, Peru
