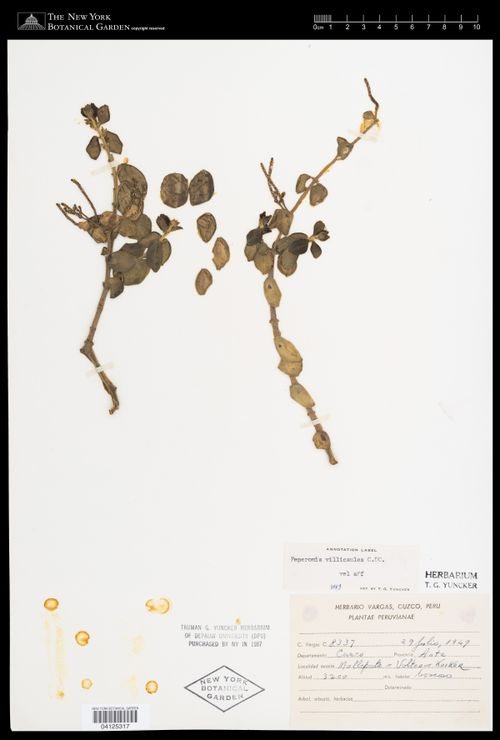

Scientific classification
- Kingdom: Plantae
- Clade: Embryophytes
- Clade: Tracheophytes
- Clade: Angiosperms
- Clade: Magnoliids
- Order: Piperales
- Family: Piperaceae
- Genus: Peperomia
- Species: P. villicaulis

Binomial name
- Peperomia villicaulis C.DC.

= Peperomia villicaulis =

Species of epiphyte

Peperomia villicaulis is a species of plant from the genus Peperomia. It was first described by Casimir de Candolle and published in the book Botanische Jahrbücher für Systematik, Pflanzengeschichte und Pflanzengeographie 40: 264. 1908.

== Distribution ==
It is endemic to Peru. First specimens were collected at an altitude of 2400–2700 meters.

- Peru
  - Cusco
    - Machupicchu
    - Anta
  - Junin

== Description ==
Leaves are shortly petiolate, broadest at the base, the bottom subnarrow, the obtuse tip on both sides, densely and appreciably covered in villi. It is 5-veined. The 5 central veins are visible; pedunculate axillary spikes, flowering 1/2 longer than the leaves, densely flowered, hairy peduncles; an orbicular plate pedicled in the center; filaments of elliptic anthers surpassing; ovary emergent, obovate a little below the stigmatiferous tip, stigma glabrous. Stony grass. Branched densely haired stems are 3 millimeters thick. Branches are about 25 centimeters long. Internodes are 2 centimeters long. The leaves are opposite. The stems are stiff and opaque when dry, up to 2 1/2 centimeters long and 16 millimeters wide. Petiole 2-millimeter peduncle is 5 millimeters long. Flowering spikes 3 1/2 centimeters long, 1 millimeter thick.
