= Lucumayo River =

Lucumayo
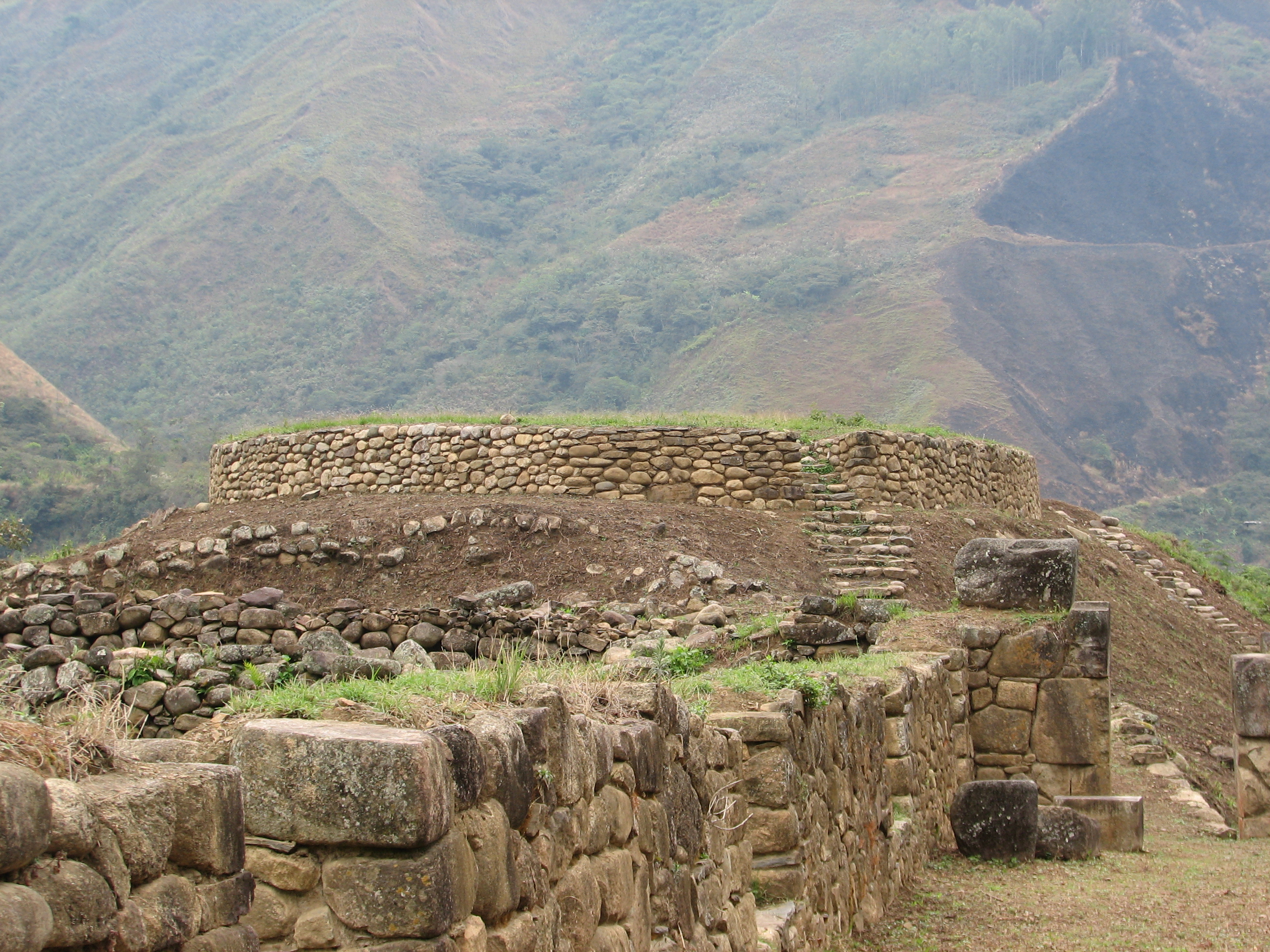
- The archaeological site of Huamanmarca with the Lucumayo valley in the background
- Etymology: Quechua

Location
- Country: Peru
- Region: Cusco Region

Physical characteristics
- Source
  - location: Huayopata District
  - coordinates: 13°08′31″S 72°18′30″W
- Mouth: Vilcanota River
  - location: Huayopata, Maranura and Santa Teresa Districts
  - coordinates: 13°00′14.5″S 72°37′29.2″W

Basin features
- Tributaries
  - left: Tunkimayu
  - right: Alfamayo; Chaquimayo; Incatambo; Sirinayoc; Huamanmarca

The Lucumayo (possibly from Quechua luq'u old hat that has lost ist form; hollow, depression (of an area), mayu river) is a river in Peru located in the Cusco Region, La Convención Province, Huayopata District. Its waters flow to the Urubamba River.

Lucumayo river originates in the Urubamba mountain range near mount Veronica. It crosses the district from southeast to northwest along the villages of Chachayoc, Alfamayo, Lucumayo, Huacarumiyoc, Huamanpata, Incatambo, Sarasarayoc, Huamanmarca and Huyro. Some of its numerous little affluents from the right are Alfamayo, Chaquimayo, Incatambo and Sirinayoc. Its main tributary is the Huamanmarca. The village of Wamanmarka lies near the confluence of these rivers, on the right bank of the Luq'umayu. This is where the archaeological site of Huamanmarca is situated. The Tunkimayo is one of the left tributaries.

East of Wamanmarka the river turns to the west and keeps this direction up to the confluence with the Vilcanota River as a right affluent. It is east of Pampayoc on the border of the districts of Huayopata, Maranura and Santa Teresa.

== See also ==
- Inka Tampu
- Quchapata
