= Tunquiorjo =

Mountain in Peru

- Location within Peru

Highest point
- Elevation: 4,200 m (13,800 ft)
- Coordinates: 13°06′00″S 72°29′23″W

Geography
- Location: Peru, Cusco Region
- Parent range: Andes

Tunquiorjo (possibly from Quechua tunki Andean cock-of-the-rock, urqu mountain, "Andean cock-of-the-rock mountain") is a mountain in the Andes of Peru, about 4,200 m (13,800 ft) high. It is located in the Cusco Region, La Convención Province, Huayopata District, and in the Urubamba Province, Machupicchu District. Tunquiorjo lies in the northwestern extensions of the Urubamba mountain range, northeast of the archaeological site of Machu Picchu.
