= Allpamayu =

Allpamayu may refer to:

- Allpamayu (Ancash), river in Peru
- Allpamayu (Cusco), river in Peru
