= Machupicchu District =

Machupicchu Machu Pikchu
- District
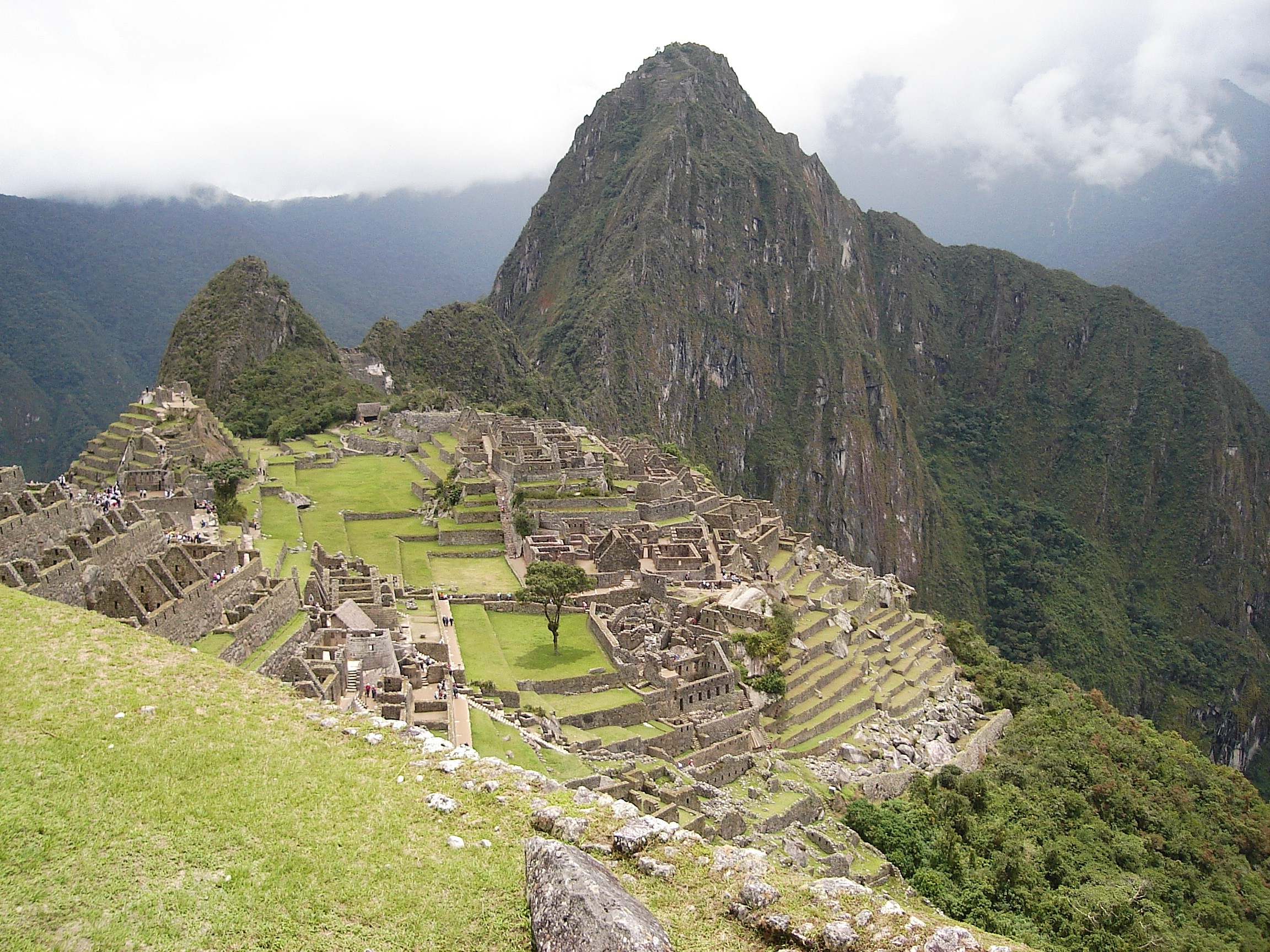
- The archaeological site of Machu Pikchu in the Machupicchu District

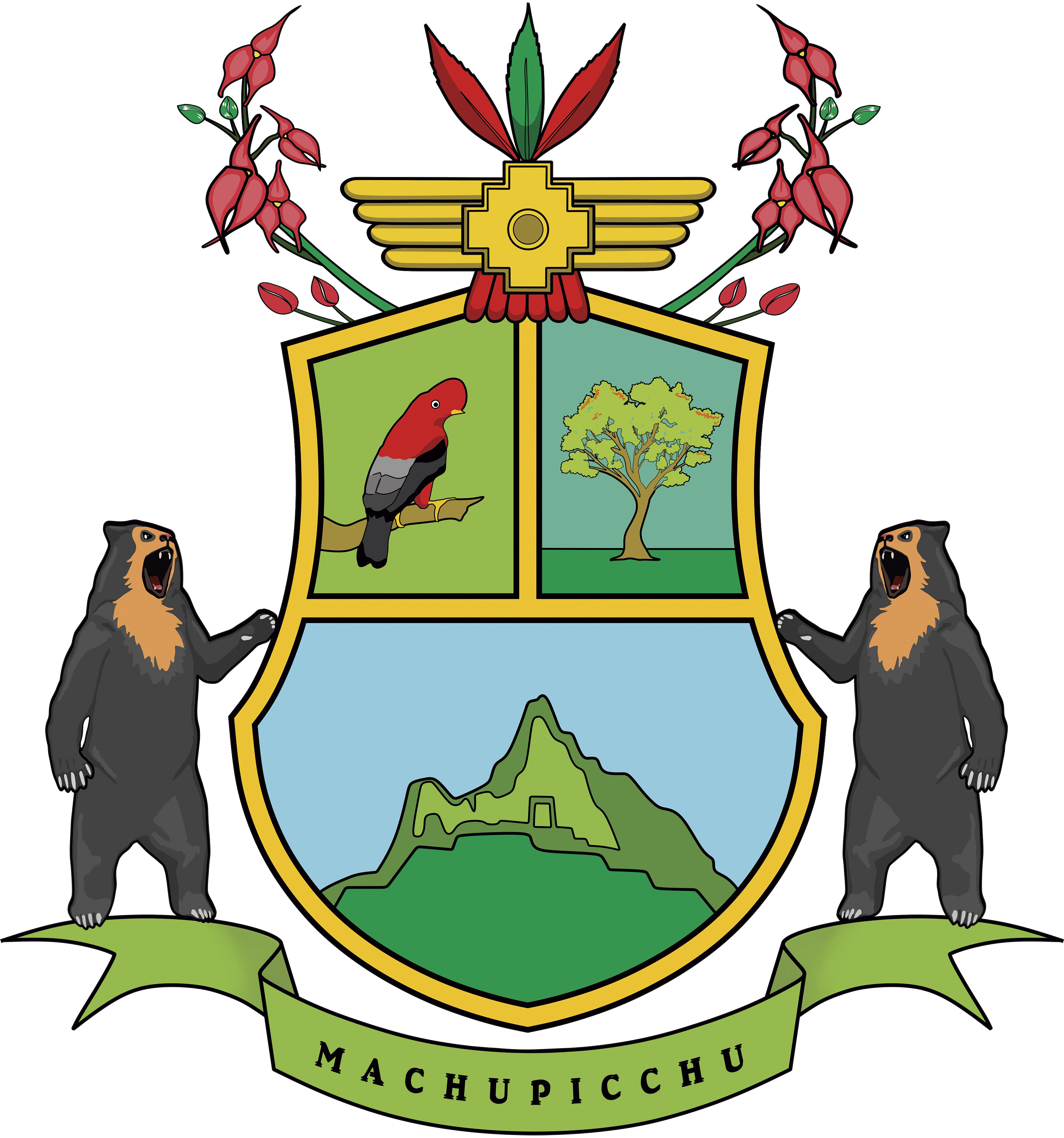
- Coat of arms

- Location within Peru
- Country: Peru
- Region: Cusco
- Province: Urubamba
- Founded: October 1, 1941
- Capital: Machupicchu

Government
  - Mayor: Elvis La Torre (2023-2026)

Area
  - Total: 271.44 km^{2} (104.80 sq mi)
- Elevation: 2,060 m (6,760 ft)

Population (2025)
  - Total: 5,077
  - Density: 18.70/km^{2} (48.44/sq mi)
- Time zone: UTC-5 (PET)
- UBIGEO: 081304

Machupicchu (from Quechua Machu Pikchu, "old peak") is one of seven districts of the Urubamba Province in Peru. The village of Machupicchu is the seat or capital of the district.

== Geography ==
The Urupampa and Willkapampa mountain ranges traverse the district. Some of the highest mountains of the district are listed below:

- K'urkur Urqu
- Phutuq K'usi
- P'allqay
- Sallqantay
- Tunki Urqu
- Wayna Pikchu

== See also ==
- Kusichaka River
- Machu Pikchu
- Machu Q'inti
- Pakaymayu
- Patallaqta
- Runkuraqay
- Warmi Wañusqa
- Wayna Q'inti
