= Curcurorjo =

Mountain in Peru

- Location within Peru

Highest point
- Elevation: 4,400 m (14,400 ft)
- Coordinates: 13°07′41″S 72°26′58″W

Geography
- Location: Peru, Cusco Region
- Parent range: Andes

Curcurorjo (possibly from Quechua k'urkur Chusquea scandens, urqu mountain, "k'urkur mountain") is a mountain in the Andes of Peru, about 4,400 m (14,400 ft) high. It is located in the Cusco Region, La Convención Province, Huayopata District, and in the Urubamba Province, Machupicchu District. Curcurorjo lies in the northwestern extensions of the Urubamba mountain range, northeast of the archaeological site of Machu Picchu.
