= Veronica (mountain) =

Mountain in Peru

- Willka Weqe, Huacrahuilki; Urubamba
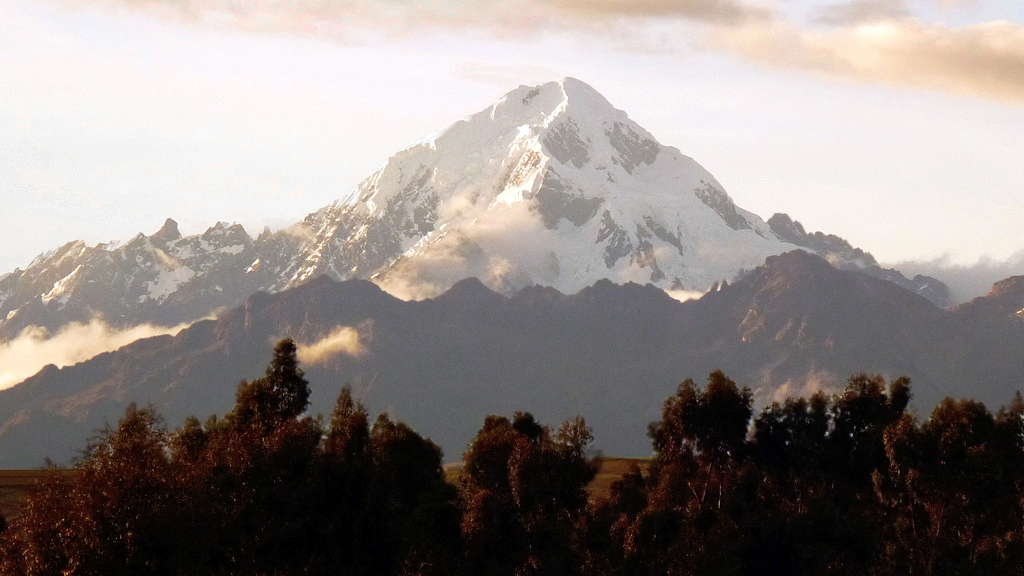

Highest point
- Elevation: 5,893 m (19,334 ft)
- Listing: Andes
- Coordinates: 13°09′51″S 72°19′33″W

Geography
- Location within Peru Location within South America
- Location: Peru, Cusco Region
- Parent range: Andes, Urubamba

Climbing
- First ascent: 1- 1956 via N.E. ridge: N. face-1973: S.W. rib-1977: N.E. buttress attempt-1983 (see AAJ, 26 (1984): 208-9)

Veronica, also called Huacrahuilki ("horn pass"), Huacay Huilcay, Wayna Willka, Waqaywillka, Urubamba ("spider's plain"), or Padre Eterno, is a 5,893 m (19,334 ft) mountain in the Urubamba mountain range in the Andes of Peru. It is located in the Cusco Region, La Convención Province, Huayopata District, and in the Urubamba Province, Ollantaytambo District, to the northwest of the town of Ollantaytambo.

== See also ==
- Alfamayo River
- Cochapata
- Huamanmarca
- Inka Tampu
- Lucumayo River
- Urubamba
