= Temple of the Moon (Peru) =

Archaeological site in Peru

Coordinates: 13°9′7.78″S 72°32′49″W

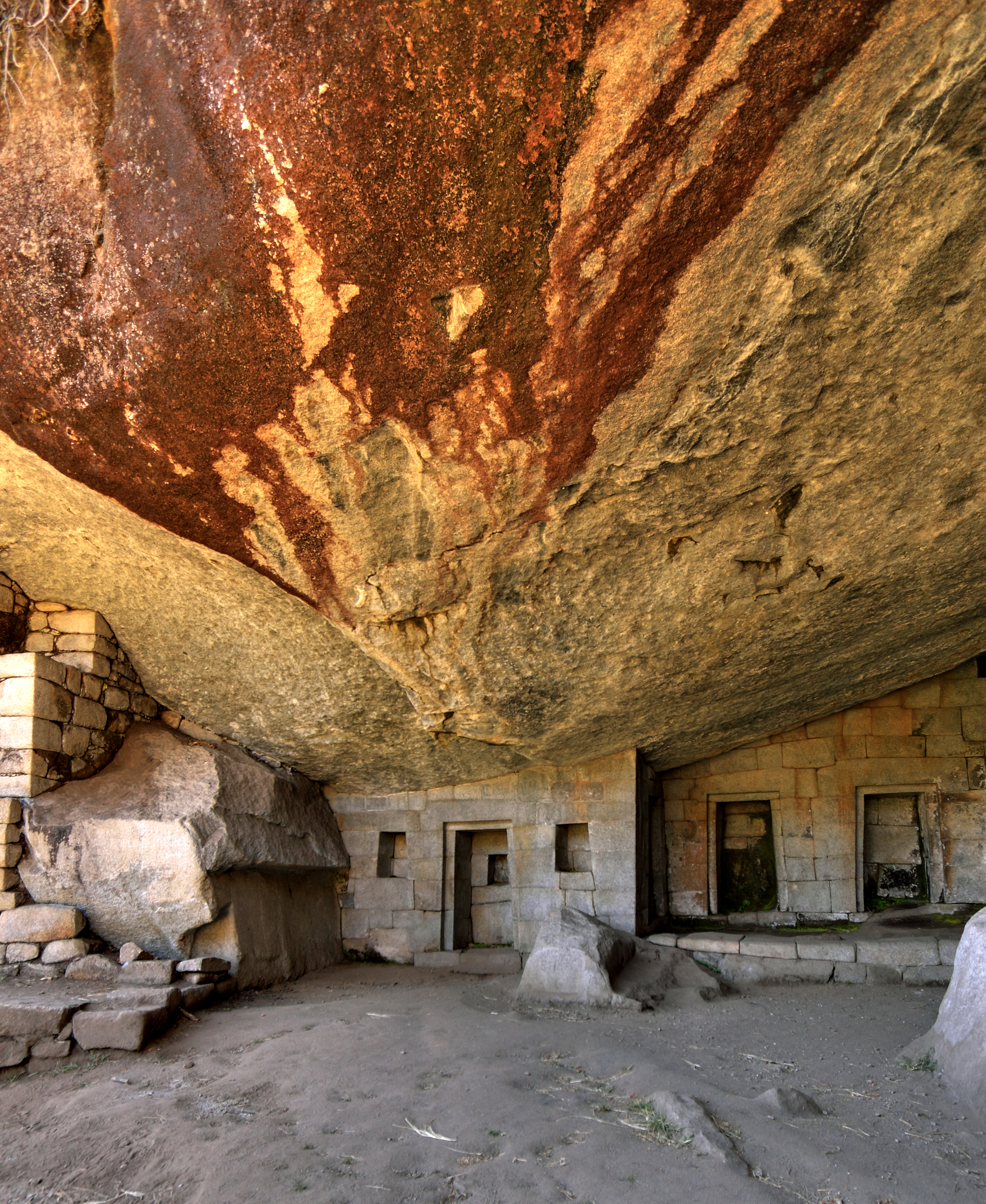
Tight-fitting constructions inside the cave

The Temple of the Moon is an Incan ceremonial temple on Huayna Picchu near Machu Picchu, in Peru. The site is made up of stone masonry and an open-face, shallow cave.

In the center of the cave is a stepped sculpture carved out of rock. Beside the stepped sculpture are steps that lead deeper into the cave. It is thought that the caves were used to hold mummies. The Temple of the Moon dates back 1500 years. It was rediscovered in 1936. It lies 390 m (1,280 ft) below the summit on the north side of Huayna Picchu.

== Architecture ==
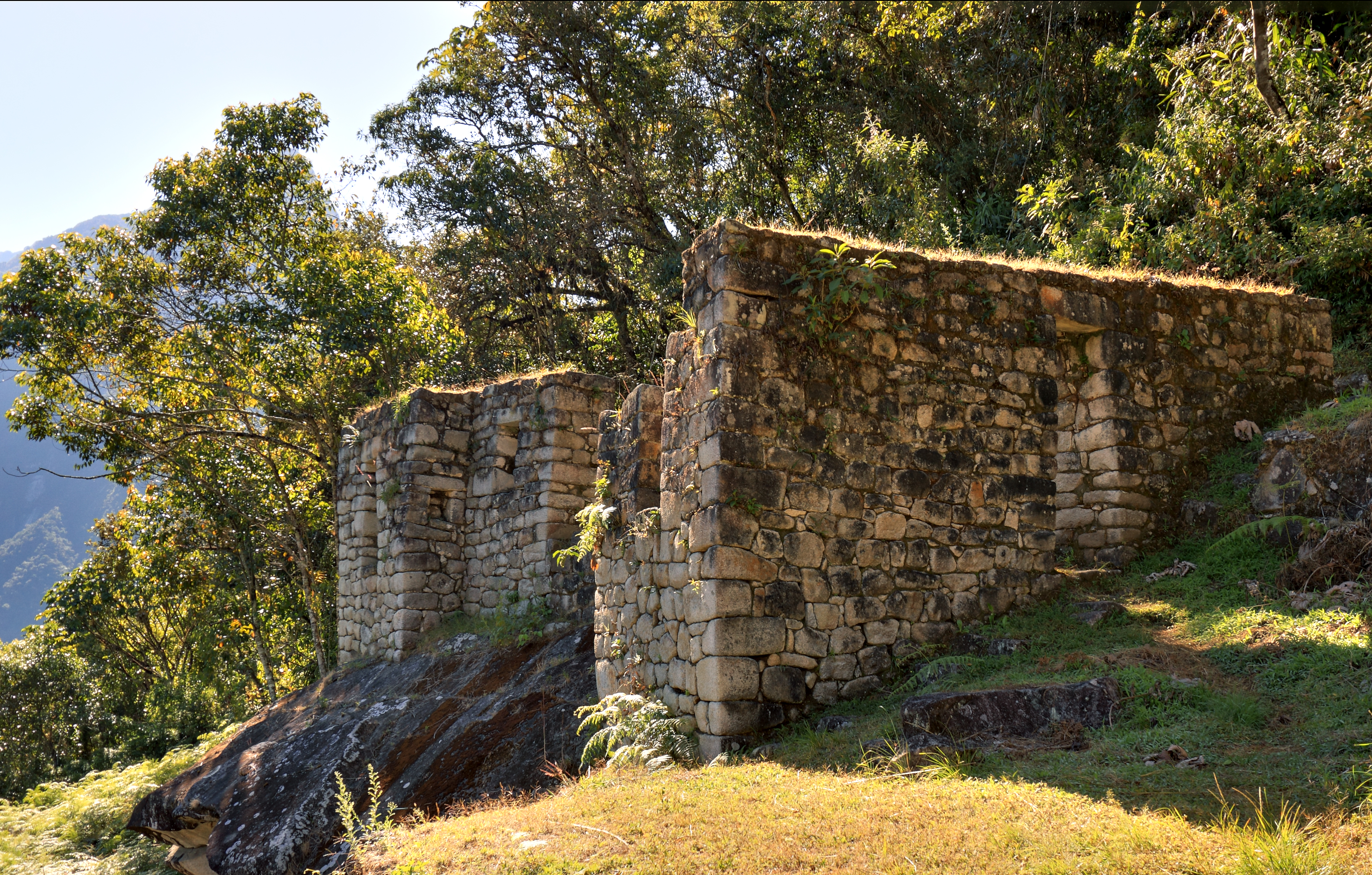
Inca ruins near the cave

The Temple of the Moon consists of three structural components: an overhanging cave with superb stonework, a very tall double-jamb doorway beyond, and farther beyond, several structures including one that again uses a cave. The stonework in the Temple is said to contain the three planes of the Incan religion to be depicted: the Hanan Pacha (the heavens, or world of above), the Kay Pacha (the earth, or physical life), and the Ukju Pacha (the underworld, or world of below), represented respectively by the condor, the puma, and the snake. The temple also boasts niches and fake doors inserted in the stones, with an enormous 8-meter-high (26 ft) by 6-meter-wide (20 ft) entrance. The premises are rectangular with the rocks of the mountains as walls. Its three doors are 1.60 meters high (in the front) and 1.00 m high (at the sides). Inside, there are six trapezoidal niches. The "temple", strictly speaking, consists of a major platform supporting a building which is raised 5 meters above the ground, with an 8-meter-high (26 ft) entrance. Huaca de la Luna (Temple of the Moon), contains 6 levels, built on top of each other during a 200-year span.

== Name ==
The similar site of Naupa Iglesia near Ollantaytambo is also called Temple of the Moon occasionally. The original name of the site of Naupa Iglesia is Choquequilla (commonly translated as "Golden Moon" ) and like the Temple of the Moon near Machu Picchu it is also located in a cave that forms an inverted "V" and as well has a stepped sculpture and a false doorway in front of it.

Some have speculated that the temple gets its name from the way moonlight radiates inside the cave at night.

== Purpose ==
The purpose of building the Temple is not exactly known. Scientists have long known and documented that people lived in caves. Keeping in mind that caves, like springs, were thought to be entrances for gods, they believe the Temple's purpose was to be a place of worship to the gods.

There is a theory that it must have been a royal tomb, place of worship and look-out post. Some believe that this was a place for sacrifices, because the structure has beautiful vaulted niches and empty trapezoids of typical Inca type and in front of the cavern, there is a rock sculpted in the shape of an altar. Others think the Temple of the Moon was a ceremonial bathing complex.

== Access ==
The trail that leads from the summit of Huayna Picchu to the Temple and the Great Cave is very exposed and can be quite slippery. The trail is closed for maintenance and it is unclear when it will reopen. A few spots have a steel handrail cable (via ferrata), but a fall in many places would have severe results. The trail that leads off from the main Huayna Picchu trail near the saddle is easier and safer, but still presents hazards. Expect at least a 45-minute walk in each direction from this lower trail, and at least an hour from the summit down the alternate trail to the ruins, plus the 45-minute walk back uphill and to the main trail.

== See also ==
- Inca trail
- Cusco Region
- Machu Picchu travel guide from Wikivoyage
