= Intihuatana =

Ritual stone in South America

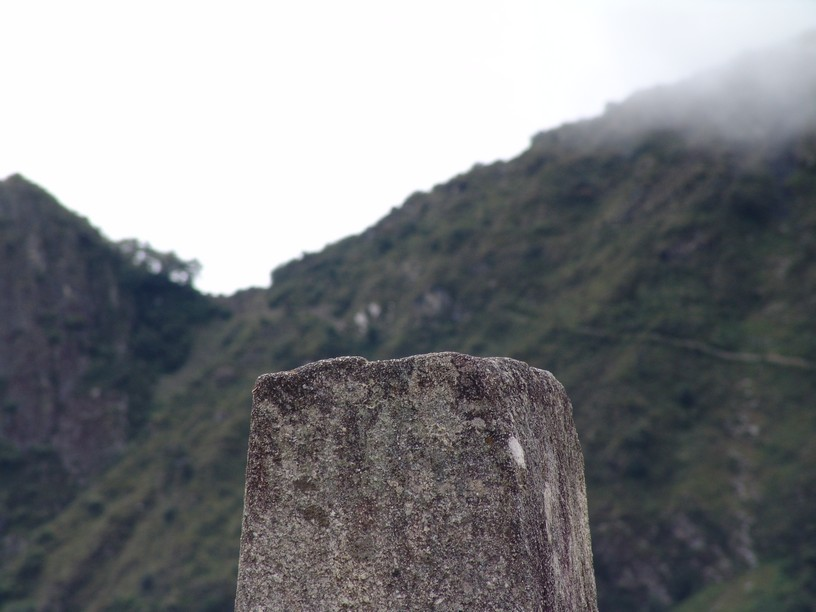
Intihuatana (the corner broken)

Intihuatana is a ritual stone in South America associated with the astronomic clock or calendar of the Inca. Its name is derived from the local Quechua language. The most notable Intihuantana is an archaeological site located at Machu Picchu in the Sacred Valley near Machu Picchu, Peru. The name of the stone (coined perhaps by Hiram Bingham) is derived from Quechua: inti means "sun", and wata- is the verb root "to tie, hitch (up)" (huata- is simply a Spanish spelling). The Quechua -na suffix derives nouns for tools or places. Hence inti watana is literally an instrument or place to "tie up the sun", often expressed in English as "The Hitching Post of the Sun".

== See also ==
- Inti Watana, Ayacucho, an archaeological site in the Vilcas Huamán Province, Ayacucho Region, Peru
- Inti Watana, Calca, an archaeological site in the Pisac District, Calca Province, Cusco Region, Peru
- Inti Watana, Urubamba, an archaeological site in the Machupicchu District, Urubamba Province, Cusco Region, Peru
- Inti Watana II and III, also known as Usqunta I and II, an archaeological site in the Lucanas Province, Ayacucho Region, Peru
