= Inti Watana, Calca =

Archaeological site in Peru

Inti Watana
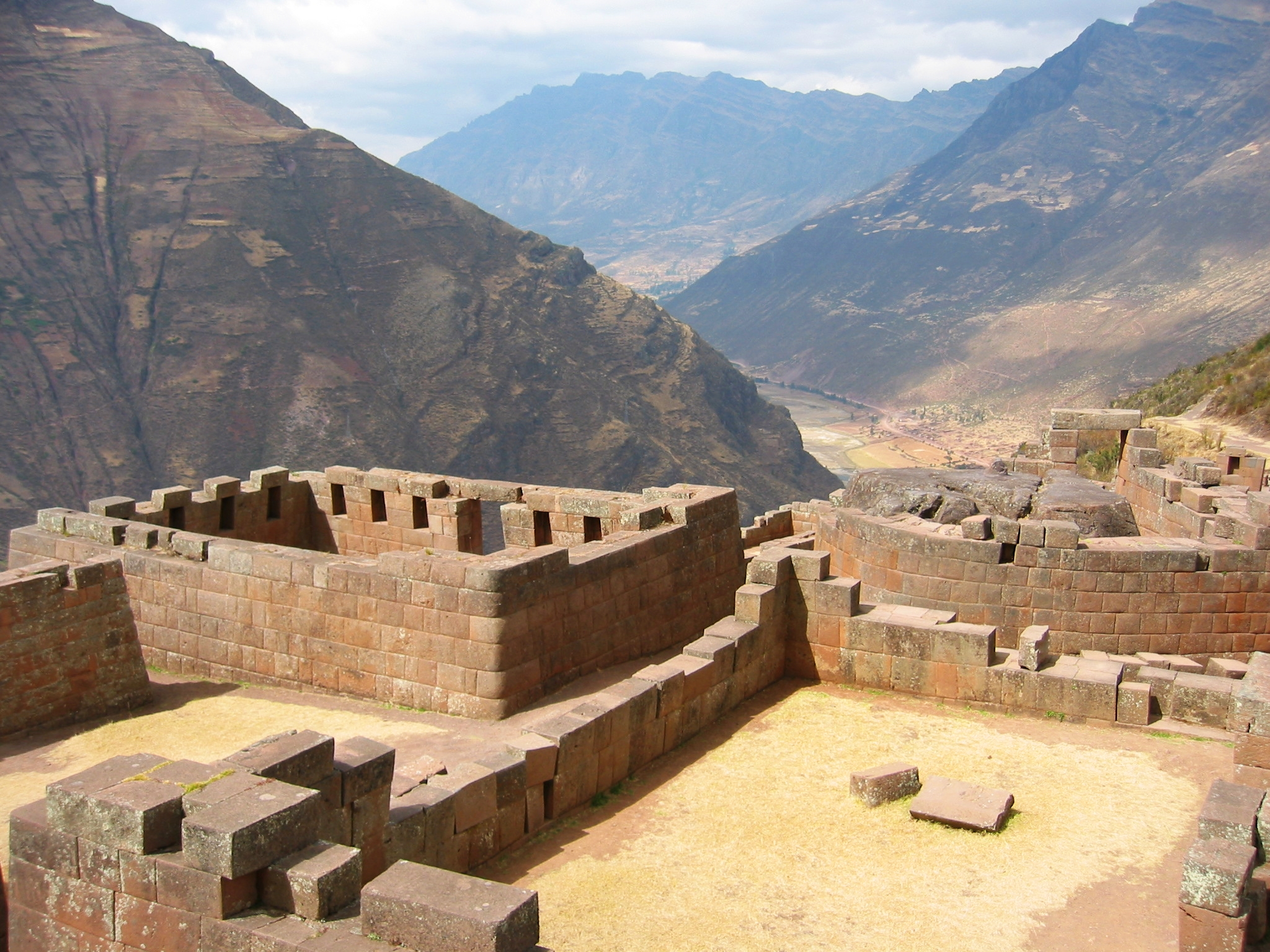
- Inti Watana
- Interactive map of Inti Watana
- 13°24′51.8″S 71°50′39.3″W
- Type: Intihuatana
- Location: Peru
- Region: Cusco Region, Calca Province
- Part of: Intihuatana

Inti Watana, Intihuatana or Intiwatana (Quechua) is an archaeological site in Peru. It lies in the Cusco Region, Calca Province, Pisac District, located 9 kilometres (5.6 mi) from Písac.

== See also ==
- Machu Kuntur Sinqa
