= Machu Q'inti =

Archaeological site in Peru

- Interactive map of Machu Q'inti
- 13°13′42″S 72°26′45″W
- Cultures: Inca
- Location: Peru
- Region: Cusco Region, Urubamba Province

Machu Q'inti (Quechua machu old, old person, q'inti hummingbird, Q'inti a place nearby, "old Q'inti", hispanicized spelling Machuquente, also Machu Q'ente) is an archaeological site in Peru. It is situated in the Cusco Region, Urubamba Province, Machupicchu District. Machu Q'inti is situated above the left bank of the Willkanuta River, near the archaeological sites of Wayna Q'inti (Quechua for young Q'inti), Willkaraqay and Patallaqta which is also named Q'inti Marka (Quechua for hummingbird village).
