= Maranura District =

Coordinates: 12.9637°S 72.6639°W

Maranura
- District
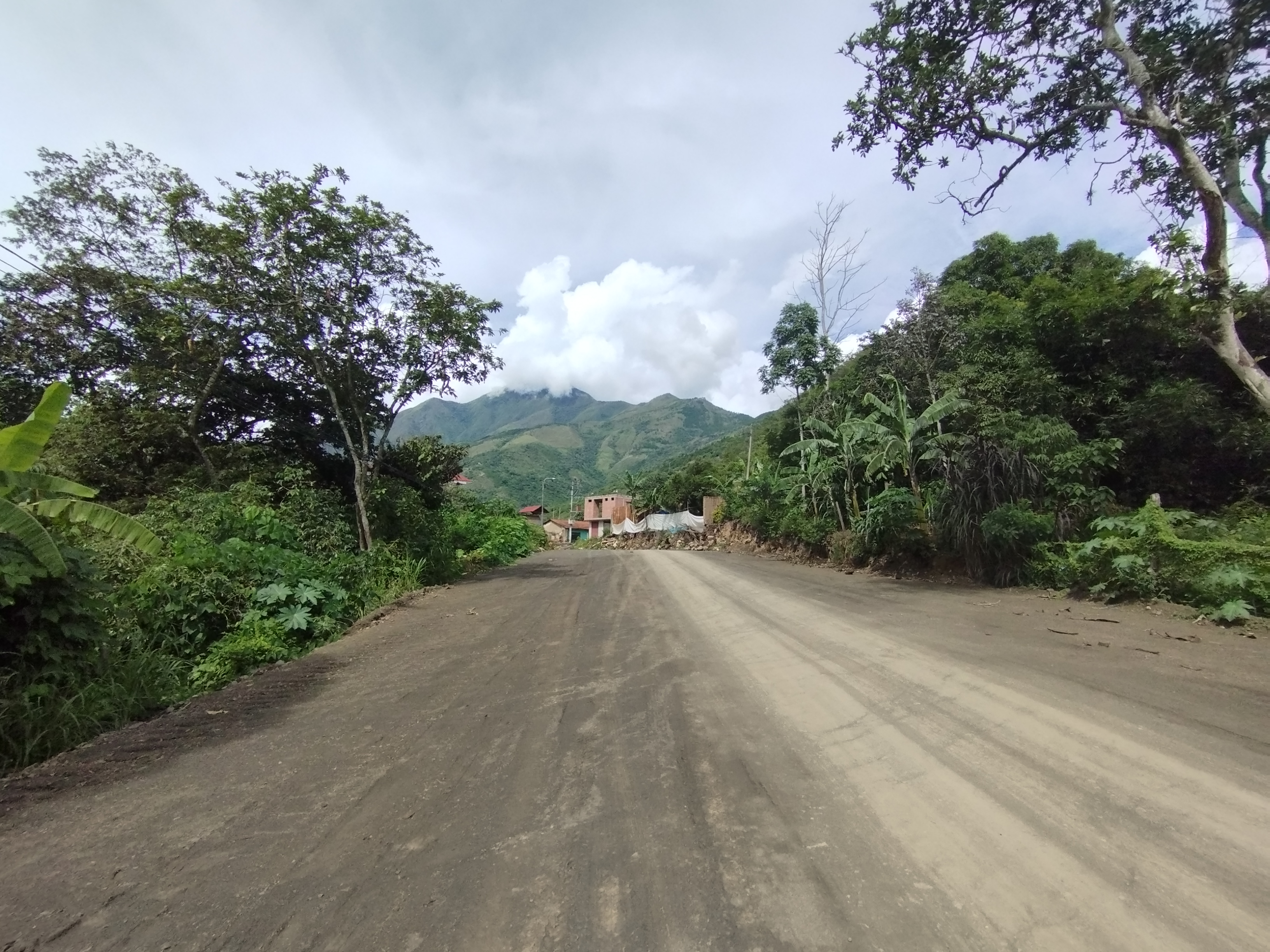
- Maranura District
- Interactive map of Maranura
- Country: Peru
- Region: Cusco
- Province: La Convención
- Founded: March 17, 1961
- Capital: Maranura

Government
  - Mayor: Manuel Jesús Gamarra Boza

Area
  - Total: 150.3 km^{2} (58.0 sq mi)
- Elevation: 1,120 m (3,670 ft)

Population (2005 census)
  - Total: 6,725
  - Density: 44.74/km^{2} (115.9/sq mi)
- Time zone: UTC-5 (PET)
- UBIGEO: 080904

Maranura District in Peru is one of ten districts of the province La Convención and is located in the department of Cusco and remains under the administration of the Regional Government of Cusco .

== History ==
The Maranura District was created by the government of President Manuel Prado Ugarteche on March 15, 1961, by Law 13620.

== Authorities ==
The current mayor of the Maranura District is Francisco Marcavillaca Alvarez of the Democratic Party We Are Peru. The district has five Aldermen: Sergio Tapia Caballero (SP), Clara Huamán Castilla (SP), Fredy Alagón Ricalde (SP), Obdulia Palma Ttito (SP), Efrain Yabar Becerra (Acuerdo Popular Unificado).
