= Huayopata District =

Coordinates: 13°00′27″S 72°33′25″W

Huayopata Wayupata
- District
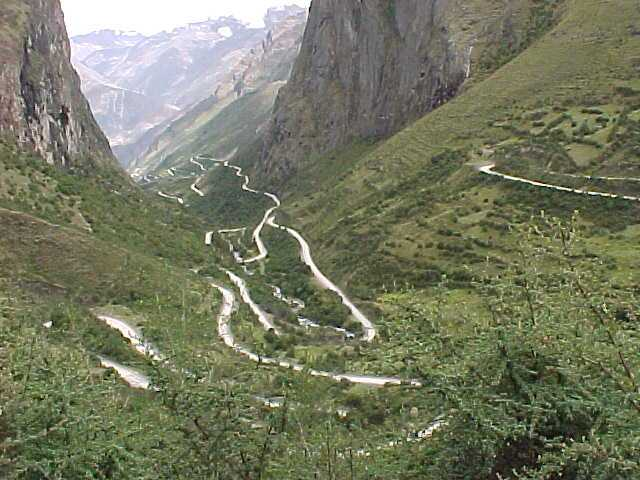
- The road from the Sacred Valley to Huayopata, coming down from Abra Malaga (Pass), 4,333 metres (14,216 ft) in elevation.
- Interactive map of Huayopata
- Country: Peru
- Region: Cuzco
- Province: La Convención
- Founded: January 2, 1857
- Capital: Huyro population: 1,619 (as of 2017)

Area
  - Total: 524.02 km^{2} (202.33 sq mi)
- Elevation, Huyro: 1,650 m (5,410 ft)

Population (2017 census)
  - Total: 4,773
  - Density: 9.108/km^{2} (23.59/sq mi)
- Time zone: UTC-5 (PET)
- UBIGEO: 080903

Huayopata District is one of fourteen districts of the province La Convención in Peru. Huyro, the capital of the district had a population of 1,619 in 2017. Nearby Amaybamba (not to be confused with the town of the same name in Inkawasi District) had a population of 663. The Peruvian government's estimate of the 2017 population of the district was 4,773 of which 77 percent of the population over 12 years of age belonged to what it defined as the Quechua ethnic group.

== Geography ==
Huayopata district consists of the narrow valley of the Lucumayo River, the source of which is the north slope of Veronica (mountain), (5,893 m (19,334 ft) in elevation, and the mountains on both sides of the valley. The Lucumayo River flows into the Urubamba River at an elevation of 1,173 metres (3,848 ft).

The Urupampa mountain range traverses the northern border of Hayopata. The highest peak of the district is Urupampa, also called Veronica. Other mountains are listed below:

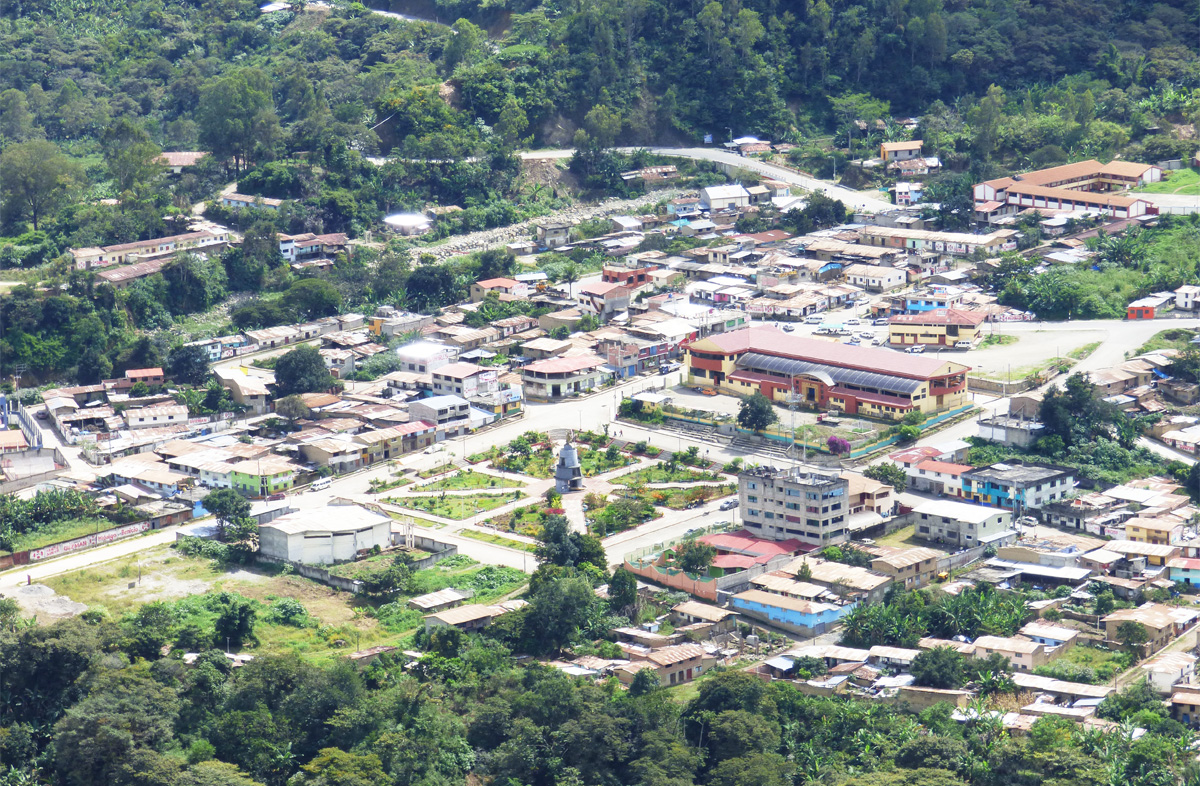
The town of Huyro is the capital of the district.

- Inka Tampu Urqu
- Kuntur Sinqa
- K'urkur Urqu
- Marquni
- P'unquyuq
- Qillwaqucha
- Sara Sarayuq
- Tunki Urqu
- Waqay Willka
- Yana Urqu
- Yanantin

== Climate ==
The large variation in elevations in Huayopata district results in ecosystems ranging from glaciers and arctic tundra at the highest elevations to tropical rainforest at the lowest elevations. The capital of Huyro has a climate of Aw (tropical savanna) under the Köppen Classification system. Under the Trewartha climate classification the climate of Huyro is classified as Awbb (tropical savanna, warm year round). Temperatures vary little during the course of the year, although a pronounced dry season occurs from May to September.

Climate data for Huyro, Huayopata, Peru. Elevation: 1,650 metres (5,410 ft)
Month	Jan	Feb	Mar	Apr	May	Jun	Jul	Aug	Sep	Oct	Nov	Dec	Year
Mean daily maximum °C (°F)	28.1 (82.6)	27.9 (82.2)	28.1 (82.6)	29.8 (85.6)	29.5 (85.1)	28.9 (84.0)	28.7 (83.7)	30.2 (86.4)	28.6 (83.5)	30.7 (87.3)	29.6 (85.3)	27.9 (82.2)	29.0 (84.2)
Daily mean °C (°F)	21.0 (69.8)	20.9 (69.6)	21.7 (71.1)	20.9 (69.6)	20.2 (68.4)	21.4 (70.5)	20.9 (69.6)	21.4 (70.5)	20.9 (69.6)	22.6 (72.7)	22.1 (71.8)	20.9 (69.6)	21.2 (70.2)
Mean daily minimum °C (°F)	13.9 (57.0)	14.0 (57.2)	13.8 (56.8)	13.6 (56.5)	12.3 (54.1)	11.5 (52.7)	11.8 (53.2)	12.7 (54.9)	13.2 (55.8)	14.6 (58.3)	14.6 (58.3)	14.0 (57.2)	13.3 (56.0)
Average precipitation mm (inches)	228 (9.0)	233 (9.2)	214 (8.4)	121 (4.8)	44 (1.7)	26 (1.0)	30 (1.2)	41 (1.6)	67 (2.6)	104 (4.1)	123 (4.8)	190 (7.5)	1,421 (55.9)

== Economy ==
The lower part of the Lucumayo River is one of the nearest and most accessible tropical areas to the heavily populated Sacred Valley and Cusco area of Peru. Crops grown near Huyro include coffee, cacao (chocolate), coca, tropical fruits, and tea. Tea was first introduced into Peru as a crop in 1913 near Huyro and is still grown there.

== See also ==
- Allpamayu
- Inka Tampu
- Luq'umayu
- Quchapata
- Wamanmarka
