= Wayna Q'inti =

Archaeological site in Peru

- Interactive map of Wayna Q'inti
- 13°13′07″S 72°27′09″W
- Cultures: Inca
- Location: Peru
- Region: Cusco Region, Urubamba Province

Site notes
- Height: 2,250 metres (7,382 ft)

Wayna Q'inti (Quechua wayna young, q'inti hummingbird, Q'inti a place nearby, "young Q'inti", Hispanicized and mixed spellings Huaynaquente, Waynaquente, also Wayna Q'ente) is an archaeological site in Peru. It is situated in the Cusco Region, Urubamba Province, Machupicchu District. Wayna Q'inti is situated above the left bank of the Willkanuta River, near the archaeological sites of Machu Q'inti (Quechua for old Q'inti), Willkaraqay and Patallaqta which is also named Q'inti Marka (Quechua for hummingbird village).
