= Inka Tampu, Huayopata =

Archaeological site in Peru

Inka Tampu
- Interactive map of Inka Tampu
- Cultures: Inca
- Location: Peru
- Region: Cusco Region, La Convención Province, Huayopata District

Site notes
- Height: 2,127 metres (6,978 ft)

Inka Tampu or Inkatampu (Quechua inka Inca, tampu inn, "Inca inn", Hispanicized and mixed spellings Incatambo, Inkatambo, Inca Tambo) is an archaeological site in Peru. It is situated in the Cusco Region, La Convención Province, Huayopata District, at a height of about 2,127 metres (6,978 ft).

== See also ==
- Allpamayu
- Luq'umayu
- Wamanmarka
- Willka Wiqi
