= Huayna Picchu =

Archaeological site in Peru

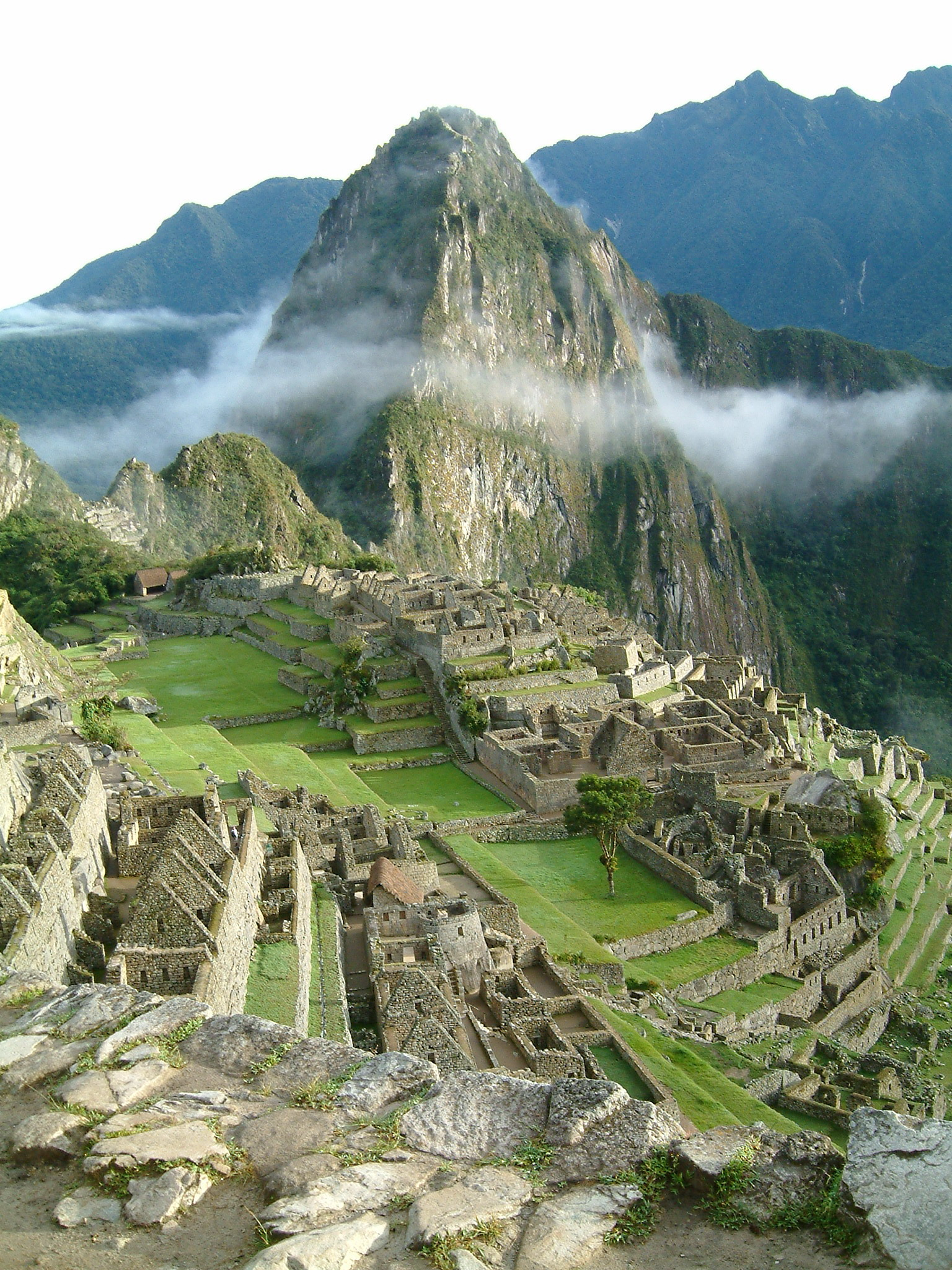
- Sunrise over Huayna Picchu towering above the ruins of Machu Picchu

Highest point
- Elevation: 2,693 m (8,835 ft)
- Prominence: 313 m (1,027 ft)
- Coordinates: 13°09′27″S 72°32′50″W

Naming
- Native name: Wayna Pikchu (Quechua)

Geography
- Location within Peru
- Location: Peru
- Parent range: Andes

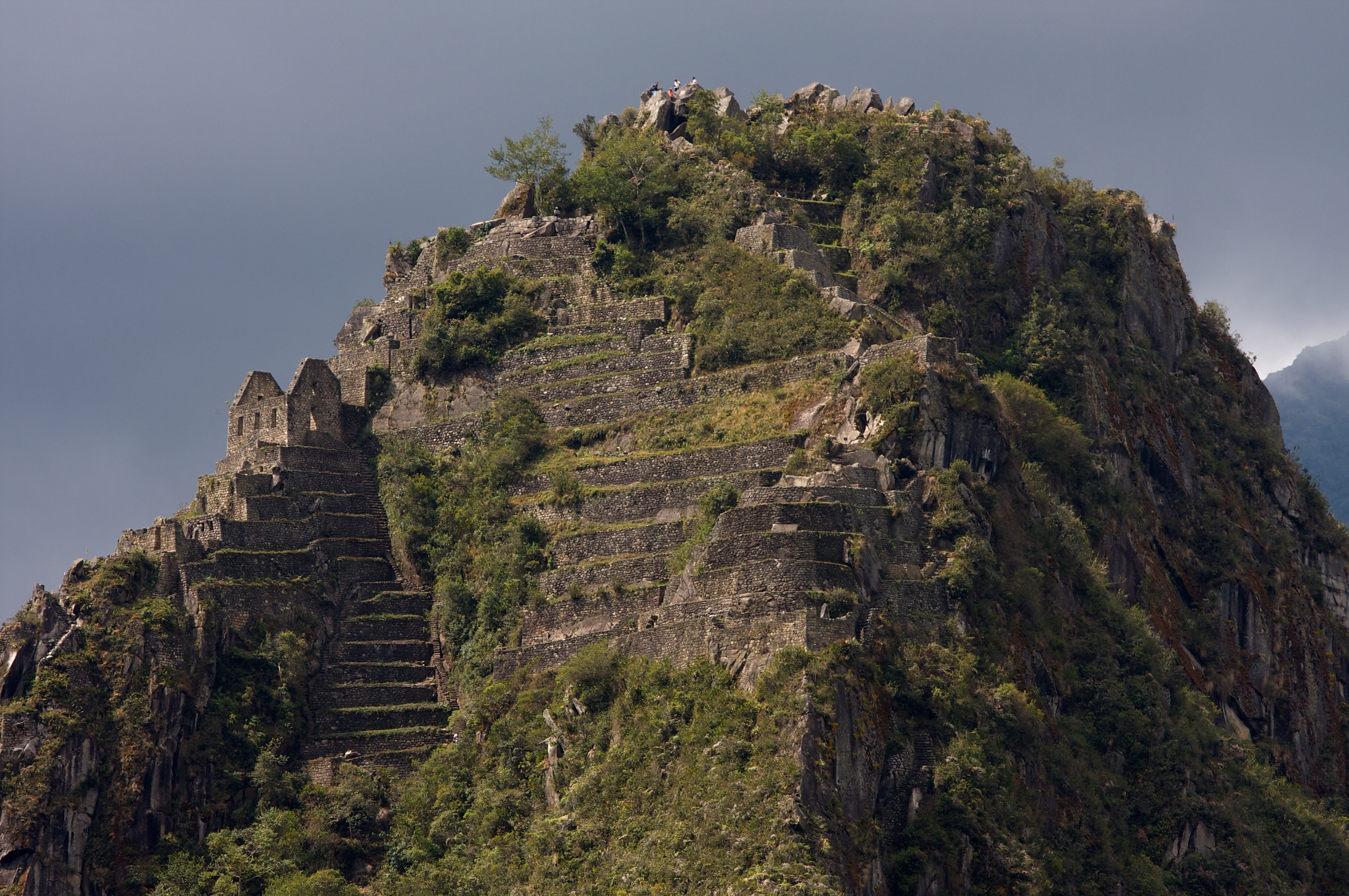
The peak of the mountain

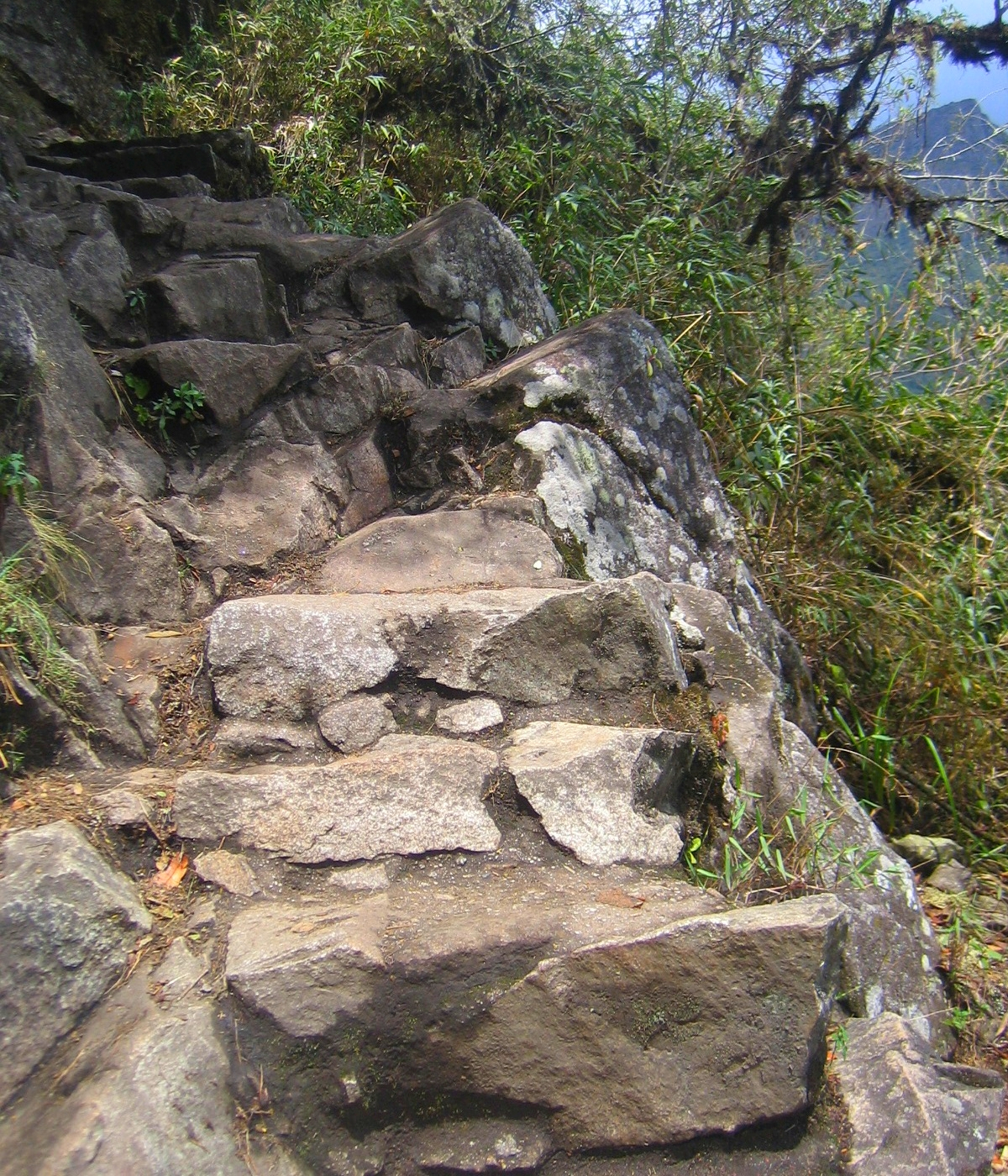
The track to the peak

Huayna Picchu, Quechua: Wayna Pikchu, is a mountain in Peru around which the Urubamba River bends. It is located in the Cusco Region, Urubamba Province, Machupicchu District. It rises over Machu Picchu, the so-called Lost City of the Incas. The Incas built a trail up the side of the Huayna Picchu and constructed temples and terraces at its top. The peak of Huayna Picchu is 2,693 metres (8,835 ft) above sea level, or about 260 metres (850 ft) higher than Machu Picchu.

According to local guides, the top of the mountain was the residence for the high priest and the local virgins. Every morning before sunrise, the high priest with a small group would walk to Machu Picchu to signal the coming of the new day. The Temple of the Moon, one of the three major temples in the Machu Picchu area, is nestled on the side of the mountain and is situated at an elevation lower than Machu Picchu. Adjacent to the Temple of the Moon is the Great Cavern, another sacred temple with fine masonry. The other major local temples in Machu Picchu are the Temple of the Condor, Temple of Three Windows, Principal Temple, "Unfinished Temple", and the Temple of the Sun, also called the Torreon.

Its name is Hispanicized, possibly from the Quechua, alternative spelling Wayna Pikchu; wayna young, young man, pikchu pyramid, mountain or prominence with a broad base which ends in sharp peaks, "young peak". The current Quechua orthography used by the Ministerio de Cultura is Waynapicchu and Machupicchu.

== Tourism ==
Huayna Picchu may be visited throughout the year, but the number of daily visitors allowed on Huayna Picchu is restricted to 400. There are two times that visitors may enter the Huayna Picchu Trail; entrance between 7:00 and 8:00 AM and another from 10:00 to 11:00 AM. The 400 permitted hikers are split evenly between the two entrance times.

A steep and, at times, exposed pathway leads to the summit. Some portions are slippery and steel cables (a via ferrata) provide some support during the one-hour climb. The ascent is more challenging between November and April because the path up the mountain becomes slippery in the rainy season. Better climbing conditions can be expected during the dry season, which runs from May to September. There are two trails of varying lengths that visitors can take to hike to the summit. The shorter trail takes approximately 45–60 minutes to reach the top, while the longer trail takes approximately 3 hours to reach the summit.

From the summit, a second trail, which is currently closed for maintenance, leads down to the Gran Caverna and what is known as the Temple of the Moon. These natural caves, on the northern face of the mountain, are lower than the starting point of the trail. The return path from the caves completes a loop around the mountain where it rejoins the main trail.

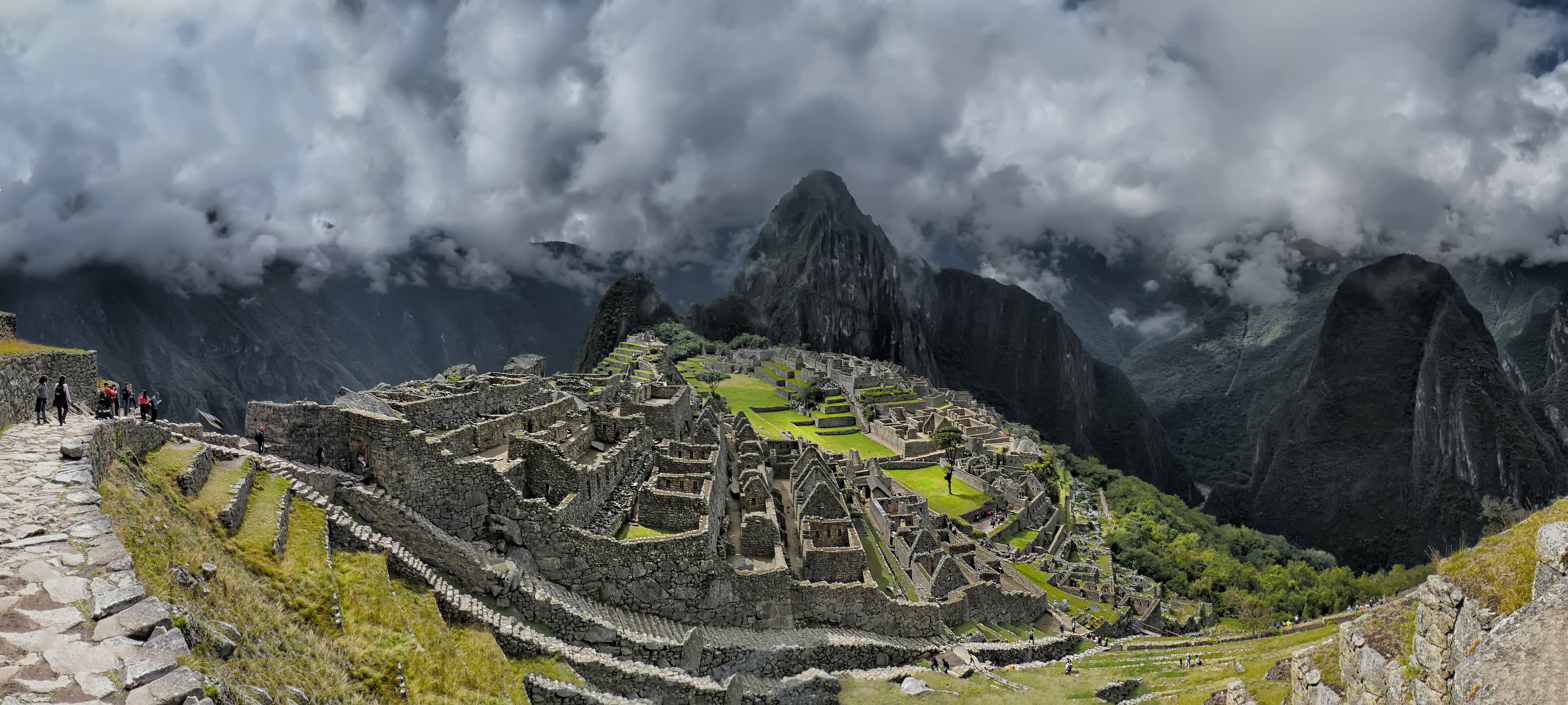
Panoramic view of Machu Picchu, with Huayna Picchu at the background

== Temple of the Moon ==
The second path leads to the back of the mountain and reaches one of the most notable underground construction complexes in the region. These are several caves, some of which have been lined (on a larger scale than the Mausoleum of Machu Picchu) with finely crafted blocks that have been cut to fit precisely with the irregular contours of the large rock outcrops that serve as their ceiling. The walls, clearly ornamental in nature, include false doorways and trapezoidal niches with double and triple jambs. Although their specific function is unknown, it is clear that they are elite constructions due to the effort required to build them. It is believed that they may have had funerary uses and that all the tombs were looted at some point in the region's history.

The name "Temple of the Moon" is arbitrary and lacks archaeological backing, although it has become popular among archaeologists and tour guides. It reveals, in any case, the common interest in comparing it in quality with other Inca buildings, such as the "Temple of the Sun" of Machu Picchu.

Reaching this site takes approximately an hour and a half walking from the citadel. From here, another path descends towards the Urubamba River.

== In popular culture ==
- Aguirre, the Wrath of God (1972) was filmed partly on the stone stairway of Huayna Picchu.
- In the Hulu series, The Path, a core belief of the fictional Meyerism movement is that Dr. Stephen Meyer climbed the ladder of burning light atop Huayna Picchu.

== See also ==
- Machu Picchu travel guide from Wikivoyage
- Putucusi
