= Huamanmarca, La Convención =

Archaeological site in Peru

Huamanmarca
- Wamanmarka
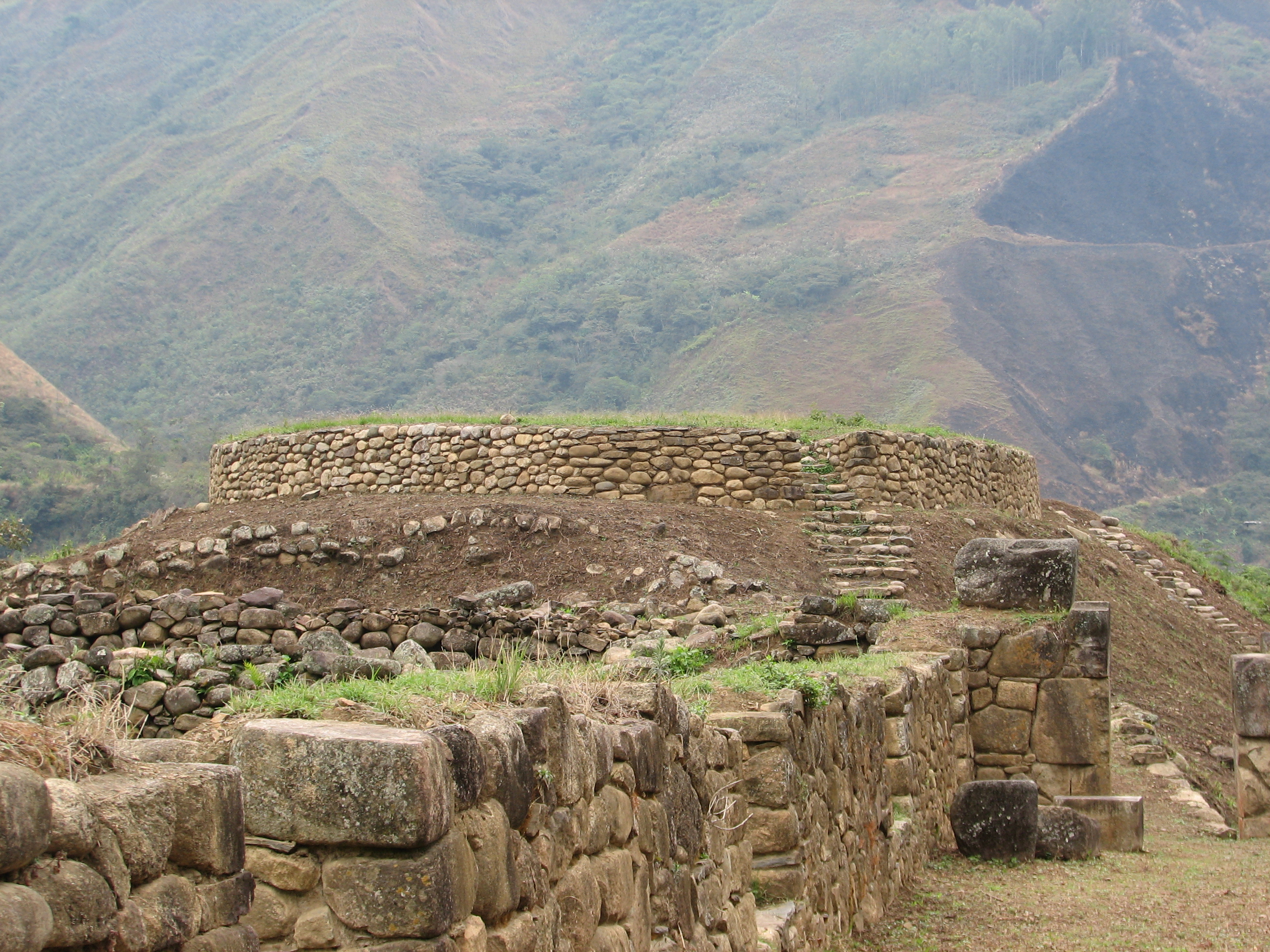
- Partial view of Huamanmarca

- Location within Peru
- 13°01′14.59″S 72°29′43.9″W
- Location: Peru; Huayopata District, La Convención Province, Cusco Region
- Region: Andes

Huamanmarca (possibly from Quechua waman falcon, marka village) (also spelled Huamanmarka or Wamanmarka) is an archaeological site in the region of Cusco, Peru. It is located in Huayopata District, La Convención Province, on the right bank of the Luq'umayu.

== See also ==
- Allpamayu
- Luq'umayu
- Inka Tampu
- Willka Wiqi
