= Inca society =

Pre-Columbian civilization

The Inca society was the society of the Inca civilization in Peru. The Inca Empire, which lasted from 1438 to 1533 A.D., represented the height of this civilization. The Inca state was known as the Kingdom of Cusco before 1438. Over the course of the empire, the rulers used conquest and peaceful assimilation to incorporate a large portion of western South America, centered on the Andes mountain ranges. The empire proved relatively short-lived however: by 1533, Atahualpa, the last Sapa Inca (emperor) of the Inca Empire, was killed on the orders of the conquistador Francisco Pizarro, marking the beginning of Spanish rule. The last Inca stronghold, the Neo-Inca State in Vilcabamba, was conquered by the Spanish in 1572.

== Population ==
Population estimates for the Tawantinsuyu society range from as few as 4.1 million people to more than 36 million. Most estimates are between 6 and 14 million people. The reason for these various estimates is that, while the Inca kept excellent census records using their quipus, knowledge of how to read them has been lost. Almost all of them were destroyed by the Spanish in the course of their conquest and rule.

== Marriage ==
Women and men had parallel roles, but were separate in Inca society. They were equally valued for the part they played in their society despite their differing roles. Marriage was no different.

Inca women were typically married at the age of sixteen, while men married at the age of twenty. Age, however, was not as important as keeping track of the stage of life that a person was at, such as whether or not they were able to work or be married. Ranks played a role in a person's marriage status as well. Men of lower rank could only have one wife; people of higher ranks than the kuraka were allowed more. If a man had more than one wife, one served as the principal wife while the others were considered secondary. Having more wives showed that the man had more labor showing that the household was wealthy. The death of the principal wife was sometimes met with the suspicion that the husband played a role in her death. The man had to find a new principal wife before he was able to recover from the previous wife's death. To prevent such suspicion and to increase the likelihood of a successful marriage, there were situations in which the couple could test how well the marriage would work out.

Trial marriages were typical of Inca culture. In this type of marriage, the man and woman would agree to try out being married to one another for a few years. At the end of this time, the woman could go home to her parents if she wished and her husband could also send her home if he did not think it would work out. However, once the marriage was made final, they could only divorce if the woman was childless. To make the marriage final, the provincial governor had to approve the union.

In the Incan society, a wedding wasn't a simple event. Instead, it was looked at more as a business-like agreement. Therefore, marriage was an economic agreement between two families. Parents on either side had to come to an agreement before the marriage took place and the couple could not be directly related to one another. Women would almost always marry men in the same social class as themselves. However, while it was very rare for them to marry a man with a higher social ranking, it was still possible for some young women. The only way for a young woman to alter her social ranking would be if a man of higher ranking took notice of her.

Once a woman was married, she was expected to collect food and cook, watch over the animals and the children and supply cloth to the government. Women of higher ranking also weaved, like those of lower ranks, but their work was used in special clothing for the higher ranks. A man's role sometimes resembled that of a woman, but acted in conjunction with one another. A woman’s household obligations would not change after she became pregnant. When she did find out she was pregnant she prayed and made offerings to an Inca god, Kanopa. Using marriage as an alliance strategy was also common among the Inca. Even before the Spaniards' arrival, the Inca used marriage as a way to claim themselves to power. After the Spaniards arrival the Inca allowed marriages between the Inca and Spaniards to gain power during a time of civil war.

The Incas were a conquering society and their expansionist assimilation of other cultures is evident in their artistic style. The artistic style of the Inca utilized the vocabulary of many regions and cultures but incorporated these themes into a standardized imperial style that could easily be replicated and spread throughout the empire. The simple abstract geometric forms and highly stylized animal representation in ceramics, wood carvings, textiles and metalwork were all part of the Inca culture. The motifs were not as revivalist as previous empires. No motifs of other societies were directly used except Huari and Tiwanaku arts.

== Shipbuilding ==
For fishing, trade, construction, transport and military purposes, the Inca built seagoing vessels called balsas by weaving together totora reeds. The largest of these vessels were 20 to 30 metres (66 to 98 ft) long, making them comparable in length to the Spanish caravel. This method of constructing ships from woven reeds is an ancient Peruvian tradition which long predates the Inca. There are depictions of such vessels in Moche pottery dating back to 100 A.D.

== Cloths/Textiles ==
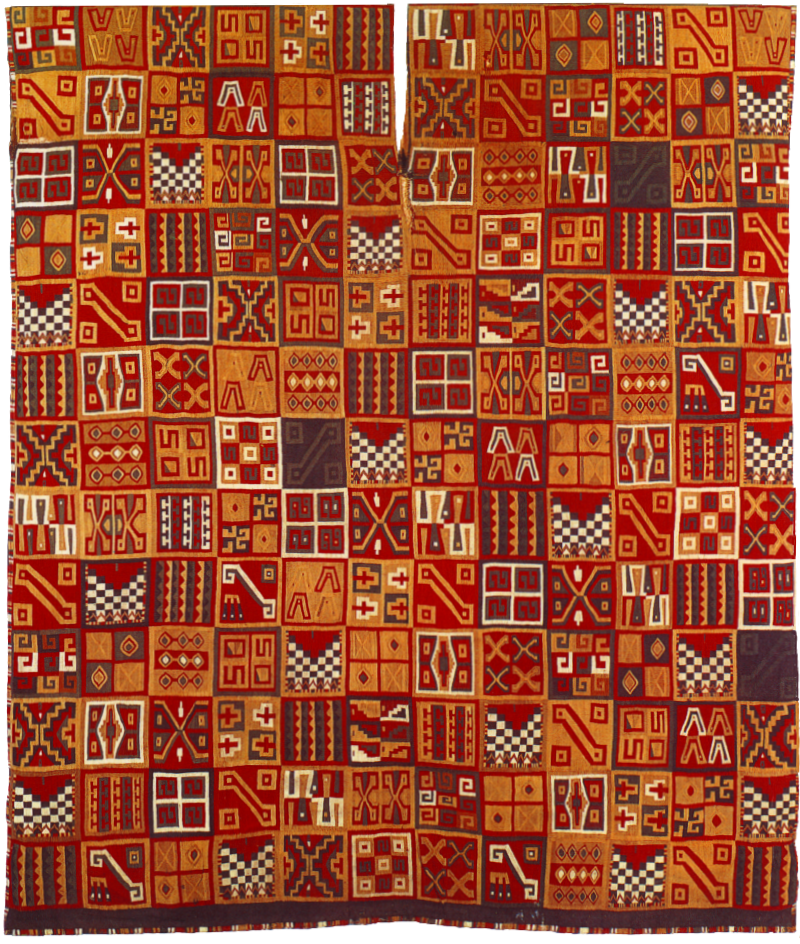
Inca tunic

Cloth is one of Inca society’s most highly valued items and was used in a variety of contexts within the Inca empire. Different types of woolen cloth were used as garments by people of different social classes. The coarsest cloth, avasco (also called ahuasca), was used by the common people, whereas a finer cloth called compi (also spelled cumbi or qompi) was worn by nobility of both the bureaucracy and military. Compi was made with various colors and patterns, and woven to a higher finish than avasco, with characteristically sewn seams on both sides. Particular care was taken when weaving cloth for royal usage, which utilized expert tapestry weaving to make densely woven fabric that could be pictorially designed.

One of the largest consumers of cloth was the Inca military. All active soldiers were rewarded with two shirts annually, and were also given blanket and tent material during service. Huge quantities of cloth were also distributed to civilians in all social classes as items of payment; civilian elites would wear fine, elaborate cloth to shirts, tunics, cloaks, and belts, and would often gift them to lower nobles as tokens of favor or reward. Cloth was commonly woven into unqu, an Andean male garment akin to a tunic. Men would also wear llauutu, a cloth band wrapped four or five times around the head. Women wore aqsu, a long rectangular cloth wrapped around the body and held with a woven waist belt. Fine quality colorful cloth was also used as sacrificial offerings, often provided by the royal lineage to be burned in honor of their deities. Some rituals would also require certain cloths or tapestries to be worn by key figures during the proceedings.

Inca cloth was decorated with insignias of rank, prestige, and societal status. Studies of surviving compi suggest Inca-style tunics use a grid of squares or rectangles. Simple checkerboard patterns are associated with military personnel, with usage of colors into a red and white checkerboard pattern signifying higher military rank. More complex expressions of the grid, called t’oqapu, were made of abstract geometric motifs and were worn by bureaucrats, nobles, and royalty. Specific patterns signify certain social identities; for instance, a zig-zag band at the bottom-edge of checkerboard tunics would differentiate Inka royalty and nobility, and other patterns would visually distinguish the 12 royal lineages. In this sense, individuals of higher status and more societal roles likely owned several tunics with differing designs, representing different aspects of their social identities. Transitions in social identities were also reflected in cloth; people would be buried with multiple tunics representing their journey up the social hierarchy, and defeated warriors were stripped of their garments and given new ones to indicate their conquered status.

== Jewelry ==
The wearing of jewelry was not uniform throughout Peru. Chimú artisans, for example, continued to wear earrings after their integration into the empire, but in many other regions, usually, only local leaders wore them. Jewelry may have been common among the Inca people, however it did not hold as much value to them because labor was the main way people paid each other.

== Ceramics ==
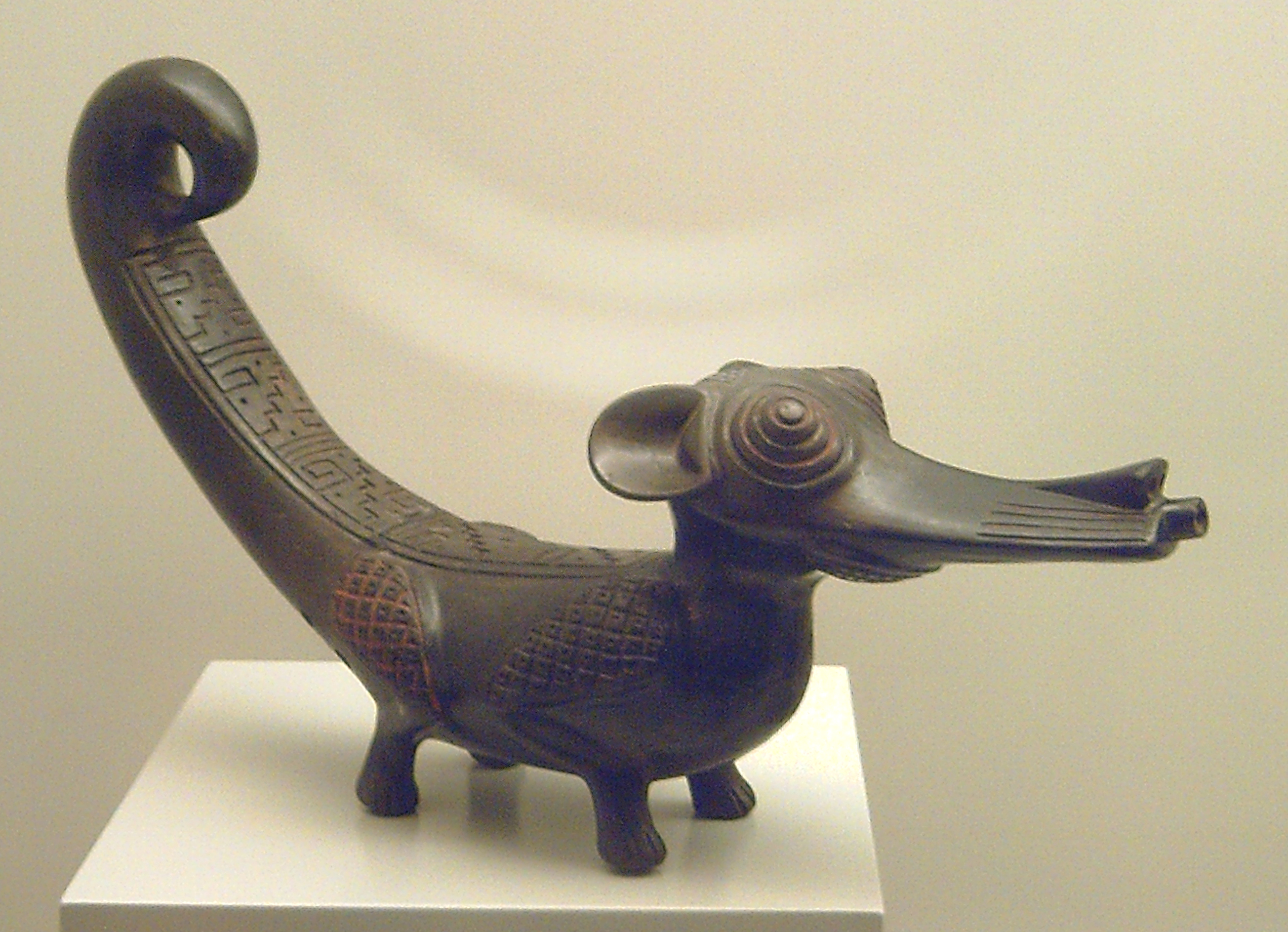
Chimú-Inca ceramic from the Late Horizon.

Ceramics were for the most part utilitarian in nature but also incorporated the imperialist style that was prevalent in the Inca textiles and metalwork. In addition, the Inca played drums and on woodwind instruments including flutes, pan-pipes and trumpets made of shell and ceramics.

Incan ceramics are usually very distinct and easy to recognize. The shapes of the vessels are highly standardized. The most typical Incan pottery would have a spherical body with a cone-shaped base. This spherical body usually includes two vertical side handles with a tall neck and flaring rim. The Incans often would place animal heads on their pottery as well usually near the top of the vessel. There were also several other popular styles for Incan ceramics which included a shallow dish with a single bird head and handle, a pedestal beaker and a single or double handled bottle.

Incans often decorated their ceramics with a multitude of images and colors. They usually decorated their pottery with bright colors like red, yellow, orange, black and white. Much like all other forms of Incan art, the pottery was often decorated with geometric shapes. The Incans would put diamonds, squares, checkers, triangles, circles and dots on almost all of their ceramic work. Other common themes were animals and insects like llamas, birds, jaguars, alpacas, bees and butterflies as well as block-like humans.

== Metalwork ==
Although not as much as textiles, metals were valued in the Andes for their color, reflectivity, and brilliance. The Inca do not appear to have their own metallurgical tradition before their imperial expansion, as no evidence of pre-imperial Inca metal production has been discovered to date. Instead, as they expanded, the Inca mainly relied on various conquered cultures’ skills and knowledge of technology and artistry into their culture. In particular, the Inca appreciated the Chimu culture’s practice of metallurgy, both in extraction and production of metal objects. Chimu artisans were thus taken to the Cuzco capital where they created art for the Incan empire. Consequently, there is notable archaeological difficulty in discerning between Incan and Chimu metalwork, and many pieces are misattributed. Other cultures’ metalworkers were similarly relocated to Cuzco or other isolated communities to produce objects for the state, or assigned as servants to Inca lords.

Mines were among the most productive resources that the Incas gained from imperial conquest, and some mines became personal property of the Incan emperor, while others were used for resource extraction. In the latter case, populations in mineral-rich areas with strong metallurgical traditions would have been responsible for mining ores and extracting metals as a form of labor tribute. The mining was often overseen by one of the emperor’s clan subordinates, who would ensure the extracted metal were received by the emperor. In line with Andean and Incan values of reciprocity, the miners were provided food, housing, and tools by the Inca state.

Gold and silver held particular importance in Incan society as they were symbols of status and spiritual power. In Inca cosmology, gold represented the sweat of the sun, and silver the tears of the moon, the two deities whom the Inca believed they were the offspring of. Thus gold and silver were closely associated with the origin of the ruling clan, and their value as visible indexes of wealth and spiritual power were second only to cloth. Consequently, Inca’s cultural value system was dominated by political symbolism around the colors of silver and gold, and hence a substantial application of Andean metallurgy was to use non-silver or non-gold metals to recreate metallic gold and silver surfaces, for usage in architecture and metal objects. Status and politics thus became Andean metallurgy’s main stimulus for growth.

A practical route of development for metals is its usage in warfare, whether it be for armor, weapons, or transport. However, metals did not play a significant part in Andean warfare, and although gold, silver, and bronze were extensively used throughout the Inca empire, iron metallurgy was never developed. This often gives rise to the impression that the Inca had an underdeveloped military; in particular, the Spanish conquest of the Inca is often misattributed to the Inca’s supposedly inferior military strength. However, unlike eastern Mediterranean societies which required iron weapons to cut and pierce for hand-to-hand combat, the Inca military relied on the crushing force of a blow from sling projectiles, and thus mainly utilized cloth for both production of slings and quilted cotton tunics for protection. In fact, most Spanish soldiers adopted quilted armor from the Inca as they regarded it superior to European steel breastplates in the humid sierra.

== Politics ==
Inca government is generally seen as an omnipotent emperor that ruled over a bureaucracy made up of local elites who had been recruited to serve in the state. This style of rule is often credited to Cuzco's success.

The Inca empire was adamant about expansion and did so through two imperialism strategies: territorial administration and indirect-hegemonic control. Territorial administration consisted of a complete take over of provinces by reorganizing the economy through increased agricultural production and control of exchange routes via the Incan road system. The territorial administration allowed the Inca empire to put in a great deal of effort to control a new territory in hopes to strengthen the empire by a flow of surplus goods back to the empire core from the overtaken province. Indirect-hegemonic control enabled the Incas to gain control over a province but would allow the local leaders to govern the province. The reason behind this strategy was to gain land and flow of surplus goods back to the empire core without spending a great deal of effort to overtake and govern.

Imperial rule was sustained through enforcement by Incan rulers and military troops on a random basis, as well as education of the provincial elite youth of the Incan way of life. Temples and shrines were also constructed in overtaken provinces to inflict Incan religion upon provincial peoples.

== Religion ==
Duality manifested in the Inca society’s organization, with reciprocal relationships between rulers and subjects forming the bedrock of political legitimacy. Duality and reciprocity extends to the spiritual realm, reflecting the Inca worldviews balance between the earthly and the divine. These concepts influenced Inca rituals, such as offerings to deities and ceremonies honoring ancestors, emphasizing the importance of maintaining harmony and equilibrium in all aspects of life. Duality and reciprocity served as guiding principles that shaped the fabric of Inca society These ceremonies were intricately woven into the fabric of Inca governance, serving to reinforce the divine mandate and rulership and the obligation of loyalty and tribute from subjects. Ritual ceremonies functioned as mechanisms for cultural continuity and identity formation, binding together diverse communities under a shared religious framework.

The belief system of the Incas was polytheistic. Inca perceived the cosmos as a sacred order governed by the harmonious interplay of the sun, moon, and stars. Gender ideologies were constructed within this cosmic framework, shedding light on the intersection of spiritual beliefs, social hierarchies, and gender roles in Inca society. Viracocha, the creator of the universe and Inti, the Sun God, were the most important gods. Viracocha was believed to have created humanity on an island in the middle of Lake Titicaca. Inti was devoutly loved so much that the Inca people called themselves "Intip Churin" which in Quechua means "the children of the sun." The Inca took part in spiritual human sacrifices known as the Capacocha. Capacocha ceremonies occurred as methods of demarcating boundaries at the periphery of the expanding empire. The Inca developed a site of local gratitude administered across the empire by encircling these sacred sites within an Inca quarter and holding rituals there. These offerings were carried out on large mountains where ceremonial sites were constructed and were believed to have been made for numerous events such as important festivals, natural phenomenon and efforts to please the mountain deities. These sacrifices were taken out onto mountains throughout the Andes and placed alive into burial tombs where they were left with items such as:figurines, coca leaves, food, alcoholic beverages and pottery. Mountains were the primary revered by numerous ethnic groups during the Spanish conquest era, with many considering them as the most significant. Remains of panpipes in the Inca style point to the fact that Inca practices were held on the peak that overlooked the location. The Inca emphasized various natural elements of the surroundings, such as the stream running down the channel, the outcrops of rock, and the highest point of the mountain at Cahuana. The Vilca camayos were the overseers of the offerings, in which they had a decision on where the sacrifices were made and the number of sacrifices made on each mountain. Mountain deities were worshiped because it was believed that they controlled things like rainfall, water flow and, therefore, the abundance and fertility of crops. The preservation of local religion was conditional upon its alignment with an administrative context that validated religion. In March, black llamas were offered as sacrifices in ceremonies overseen by the Inca, with the assistance of priest. The attire of priests and participants was richly adorned with intricate designs and vibrant colors, serving both practical and symbolic purposes. Before significant ceremonies, fasting was customary, with priests required to refrain from consuming salt, pepper, meat, fish, spicy foods, and engaging in any form of sexual activity.

== Other practices ==
The Inca practiced cranial deformation. They achieved this by wrapping tight cloth straps around the heads of newborns to alter the shape of their still-soft skulls. These deformations did not result in brain damage. Researchers at the Field Museum believe that the practice was used to mark different ethnicities across the Inca Empire.

The Inca preserved bodies through mummification. Mallquis were mummified bodies of deceased Inca rulers and nobles, preserved and venerated as ancestral spirits. Mallquis contributed to the Inca worldview, shaping their beliefs about ancestry, the afterlife, and the continuity of power across generations. Andean mummy bundles were meticulously arranged, taking into account not just the positioning of the body but also the material artifacts accompanying the ancestor in death. The arrangement of the body, manipulation of its posture, and the inclusion of surrounding funerary items all played a role in enhancing the body’s symbolic importance, aligning this research with art historic inquiries. Bodies were wrapped in the fetal position in cloth or leather. Rank determined how the Incas were buried. Common people were placed in an open cave or chullpa for possible visiting. Emperors' organs were removed and placed in jars separate from their bodies. After preparation, they were placed where they most occupied in life.

== Agriculture ==
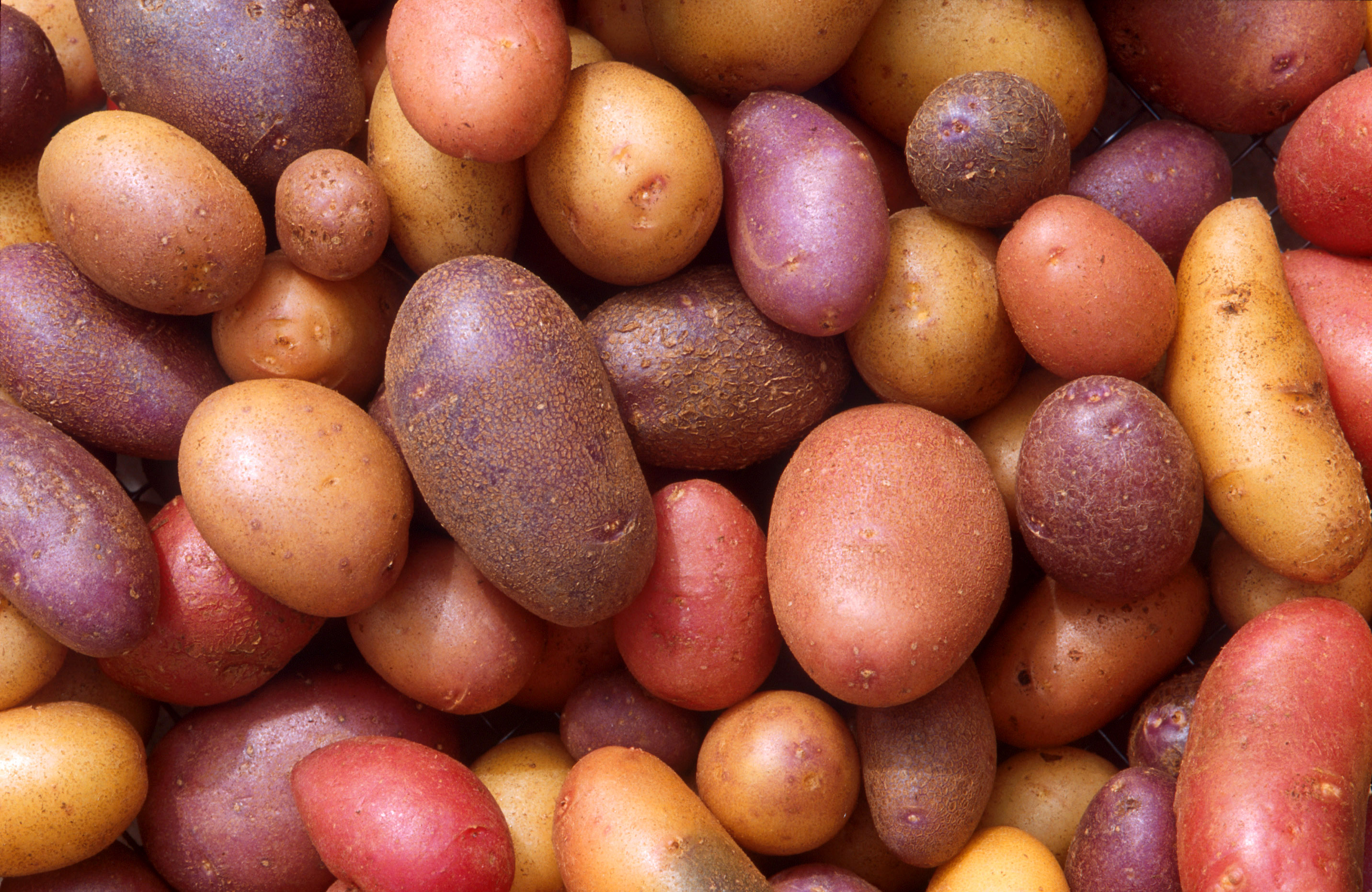
Around 200 varieties of Peruvian potatoes were cultivated by the Incas and their predecessors

It is estimated that the Inca cultivated around seventy crop species. The main crops were: potatoes, sweet potatoes, maize, chili peppers, cotton, tomatoes, peanuts, an edible root called oca and the pseudograins quinoa and amaranth. The crops developed by the Inca and preceding cultures makes South America one of the historic centers of crop diversity (along with:the Middle East, India, Mesoamerica, Ethiopia and the Far East). Many of these crops were widely distributed by the Spanish and are now important crops worldwide. Salsa was originated by the Inca people using tomatoes, chili peppers and other spices. In the Incan settlement of Vitcos, pollen from corn and quinoa was found in several soil samples which date back as early as the Incan period.

The Inca cultivated food crops on dry Pacific coastlines, high on the slopes of the Andes and in the lowland Amazon rainforest. In mountainous Andean environments, they made extensive use of terraced fields which not only allowed them to put to use the mineral-rich mountain soil which other peoples left fallow but also took advantage of micro-climates conducive to a variety of crops being cultivated throughout the year. A contributing factor for the ability of the Inca to expand their population and agriculture as quick as they did, was because of a small climate shift that allowed for slightly warmer temperatures and a small increase in annual precipitation. This contributed to the Inca's ability to use terraced and irrigated fields in higher elevations, opening up vast amount of the Andes Mountains for Inca agriculture. Agricultural tools consisted mostly of simple digging sticks.

The Inca developed qollqas, a building made of adobe, field stone, clay mortar, plaster and pirca used for food storage. These granaries stored: corn, quinoa, tomatoes, potatoes, chicha (maize beer), fruit, salt, fish, tubers and grain. Qollqas allowed for the survival of food supplies in the cold climate of the Andes.

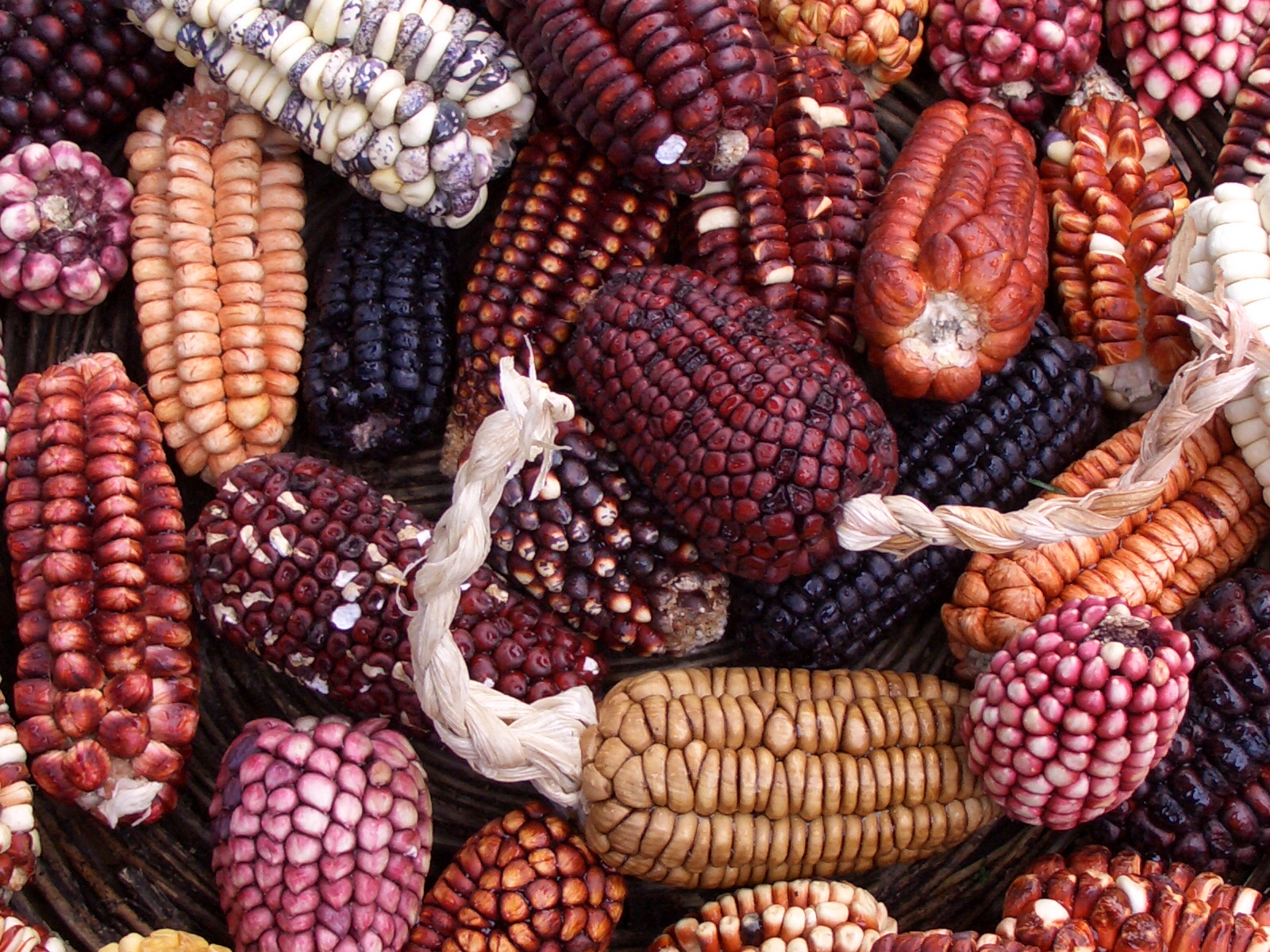
Many varieties of Peruvian corn were well-known to the Incas for centuries

The Inca also raised llamas and alpacas for their wool, meat and to use them as pack animals and captured wild vicuñas for their fine hair.

The Inca road system was key to farming success as it allowed the distribution of foods over long distances. The Inca also constructed vast storehouses, which allowed them to live through El Niño years while some neighboring civilizations suffered.

Inca leaders kept records of what each ayllu in the empire produced but did not tax them on their production. They instead used the mita for the support of the empire.

The Inca diet consisted primarily of fish and vegetables, supplemented less frequently with the meat of cuyes (guinea pigs) and camelids. In addition, they hunted various animals for meat, skins and feathers. Maize was malted and used to make chicha, a fermented alcoholic beverage.

== Economy ==
According to Ferreira and Chamot:

"The social system of the Incas had an ancient Andean origin based on the ayllu, an extended family group with a common ancestor. The economic system was also based on ancient social structures and can be explained through several principles, namely reciprocity, redistribution, and vertical control."

These authors also add:

"Redistribution, a practice employed by the state, ensured that all agricultural goods not exchanged by reciprocity were to be distributed in the different areas of the empire in the case of bad crops."

In essence, the Inca government functioned as a safeguard against mass starvation.

Unlike the Europeans, gold and silver were not used as a form of currency. Instead, clothing and food were distributed by the rulers in exchange for labor.

The Incan required tribute from those they conquered. Historical records show that agricultural production as well as cloth production increased after the Incan conquest.

== Infrastructure ==
Qhapaq Ñan Network (Inca Road)

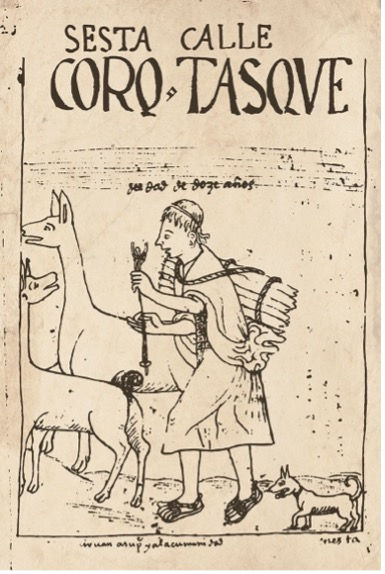
Llama herder using Qhapaq Ñan

The "Qhapaq Ñan" (Inca Road), Quechua for “the Way of the Lord”, was largely used and constructed across the Inca Empire, for both the nobility and Inca state business. The Inca Road, although used heavily by the Inca elites, were not only for the elites, but also used to send and receive information hastily, by the means of the Chasqui (official messengers) throughout the empire. It was also used to expand the empire by mobilizing military campaigns, but also by civilians to transport goods, either by foot or with the help of domesticated herds of llamas and alpacas. Additionally, not only were Incan roads expansive, reaching all over the Andes, but they were also well planned and maintained. The Inca made a standard design for the roads and carried out the standard throughout the empire. Roads were built so that they were easily drained to prevent damage to the roads and flooding. The roads were cleaned often by designated maintenance workers. Lodges for traveling nobles were also constructed alongside the roads. Rest stops called tambos were built close to roads with water supplies leading to each so that travelers and messengers could have a place to rest and clean water to drink. Military storehouses were also built near the roads and kept food for when troops were traveling. Bridges were built across rivers that were too deep to cross and large flat stones were placed along the sides of roads as markers to distinguish different sections of the roads. The Inca road network also served as a connection hub for the various regions across the empire. This allowed the Inca to organize military campaigns along with using the vast road system as a way to socially control their newly conquered territories and peoples by controlling different aspects of communication, trade, pilgrimage, taxation (mita), etc. This emphasizes the importance of the Inca road system as a crucial political, religious, and social backbone of the Inca Empire. The Inca Road also positively impacted the empire by affecting small local communities that lived along the road networks which then uplifted the entire empire as a whole through a bottom-up approach. The bottom-up approach conveys how the different uses of the Inca road by both elites and non-elites affects the roads impacts and usage throughout the Andes for militarist and social conquest by the Incas.

The Inca relied on and worshiped water heavily. A temple was built, the Incamisana, to worship water and the deities granting them water. The temple, as well as many other buildings constructed by the Inca, incorporated aesthetics, underground water conduits and hydraulic systems. The Inca also utilized the Qhapaq Ñan for religious purposes, pilgrims would take the Inca road to a shrine located near the coast. The Inca understood water was needed for agricultural production (used in terraces) and for domestic purposes. The civil engineers of the time for the Inca were tasked with laying out diversion and canal routes to a designated spot, finding what water source would give the desired flow rate and what elevation the water source would need to be tapped from for gravity to work effectively. Sanitation was also well known by the Inca. The Inca had their own wastewater treatment systems and it is documented that they would collect the human waste to perform land application to help ensure successful harvest seasons.

However, there were more uses for the Royal road, another translation, than just military or religious purposes. It allowed for complex trade network throughout the Andes. The Inca road was also utilized by local populations living alongside the Royal Road. It facilitated local roadside economic activity alongside improving the logistics of traveling on the Inca road. The local populations were able to use the road for their own benefits because the Inca elite were unable to fully control the full span of the Royal Road. This then conveys how the elites and non-elites interacted with the road networks. While the elites saw the road as a means of transportation along with information exchange via the chaskis, locals experienced the road as something to be maintained and repaired. The Qhapaq Ñan was utilized by the Inca for various purposes, but it also served as a way to for the vast empire to maintain connected with itself through vast distances and environments. The maintenance of the royal road network conveys certain levels of cooperation within the Inca Empire which led to its successfulness in conquest and ruling along with the physical success of the road itself, so much so, that the Inca Road network is still being used today. The roads utilization by Indigenous communities is still something that is done today. The Inca road, in the modern day, is a reminder to the indigenous population of how well organized and socially advance the Inca empire was for constructing one of the most expansive, spanning 40,000 kilometers, and multipurpose road networks of any empire.

== See also ==
- Spanish conquest of the Inca Empire
