= Alfamayo River =

River in the Cusco Region, Peru

- Etymology: Quechua

Location
- Country: Peru
- Region: Cusco Region

Physical characteristics
- Mouth: Vilcanota River
  - coordinates: 13°4′5.70″S 72°24′31.61″W

Alfamayo River (possibly from Quechua allpa earth, mayu river, "earth river") is a river in Peru located in the Cusco Region, La Convención Province, Huayopata District. It is a right tributary of the Lucumayo, an affluent of the Vilcanota River.

The Alfamayo originates south of the Huamanmarca River near the lake Huamanmarcacocha. Its direction is mainly to the southwest. The confluence with the river Lucumayo is near the village Alfamayo.

== See also ==
- Luq'umayu
- Inka Tampu
- Veronica (mountain)
- Wamanmarka
