= Putucusi =

Mountain in Peru

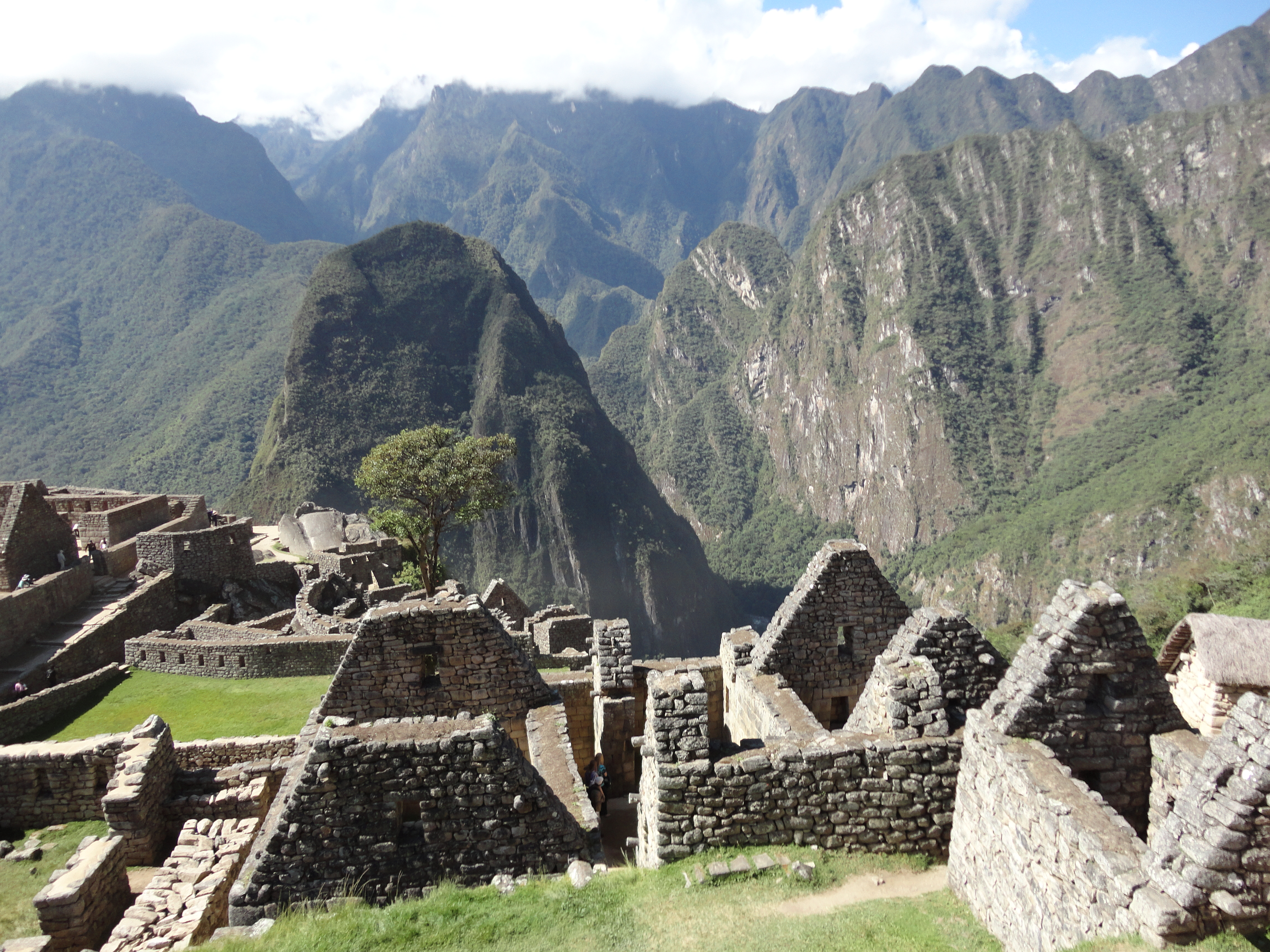
- Putucusi (center-left) behind the ruins of Machu Picchu

Highest point
- Elevation: 2,560 m (8,400 ft)
- Coordinates: 13°09′20″S 72°32′10″W

Geography
- Location within Peru
- Location: Peru, Cusco Region
- Parent range: Andes

Putucusi (possibly from Quechua phutu bud, -q a suffix, k'usi a cucurbit species, a small zucchini or Cucurbita pepo, "budding zucchini (or Cucurbita pepo)") is a round-shaped mountain located on the opposite side (northeast) of the Urubamba River to Machu Picchu in the Cusco Region of Peru. Reaching approximately 2,560 metres (8,400 ft) above sea level at its peak, the mountain offers epic views of Machu Picchu and the surrounding Urubamba River valley.

"Putu Cusi" has been described by Quechua-speaking guides as "Happy Mountain". According to Glosbe Glosbe online Quechua-English dictionary, "Kusi" means "happy", and "Putuq" translates to "trapezoid". As the feature could be seen as a trapezoidal mountain that would align with this translation. It is important to recognize that Quechua has several dialects.

Putucusi, Machu Picchu ("old peak" in Quechua) and Huayna Picchu ("young peak") are considered apus or holy mountains by the local Quechua people.

== Climbing ==
The view of Machu Picchu from the summit requires a 1.5-hour trek up the mountain, with approximately 1,700 wood and rock steps. A recently discovered Inca Trail, the path lies just 10 minutes west of Aguas Calientes following the train tracks along the Urubamba River. The entrance is free.

The first half of the journey is jungle trail, and involves several vertical wooden ladders, the largest of which scales over 100 feet (30 m). The second half presents views of Aguas Calientes and the Urubamba River valley, as the trail ascends the eastern face of Putucusi in switchback fashion. The trail passes through native flora including pisonayes, q'eofias, alisos, puya palm trees, ferns and more than 90 species of orchids.

In spring 2011, floods wiped out the vertical ladder section of the climb, making an ascent impossible without professional climbing gear, but by August 2012, all the ladders had been replaced.

Updated to June 2016, the access to the trail has been restricted and forbidden, due to the lack of maintenance of the path. All the ladders are indeed destroyed and it's impossible and extremely dangerous to climb up without professional climbing equipment. Local rangers are monitoring the area and the entrance to avoid unauthorized accesses and prevent accidents.

== Images ==
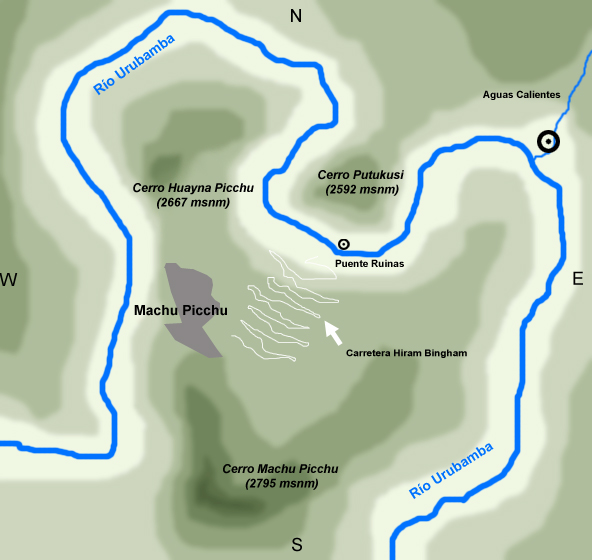
Sketch map of the site Machu Picchu showing the location of Putucusi

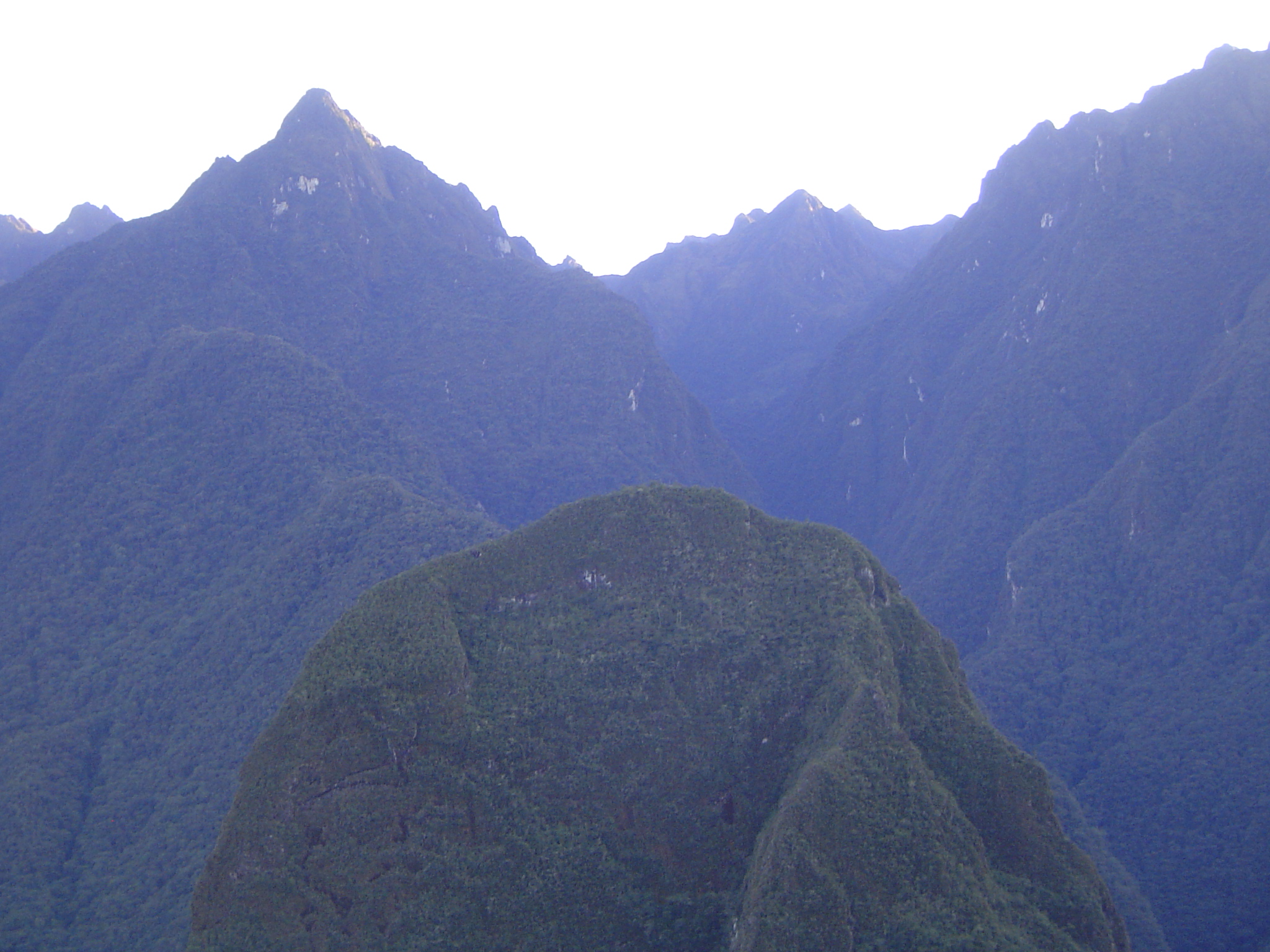
View of the summit of Putucusi from Machu Picchu

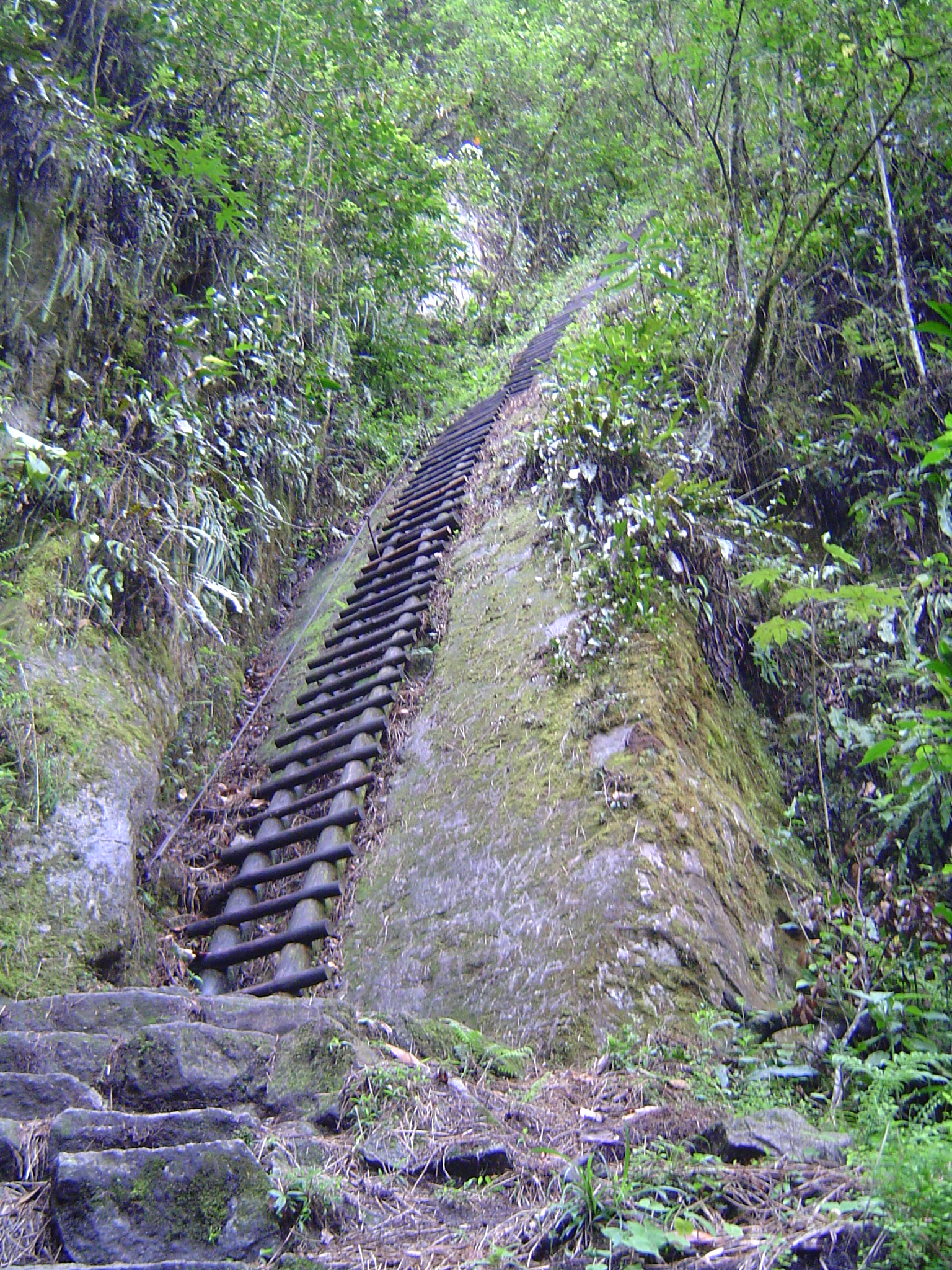
The largest of the steep wooden ladders on the trek to the summit of Putucusi, shown in 2007.

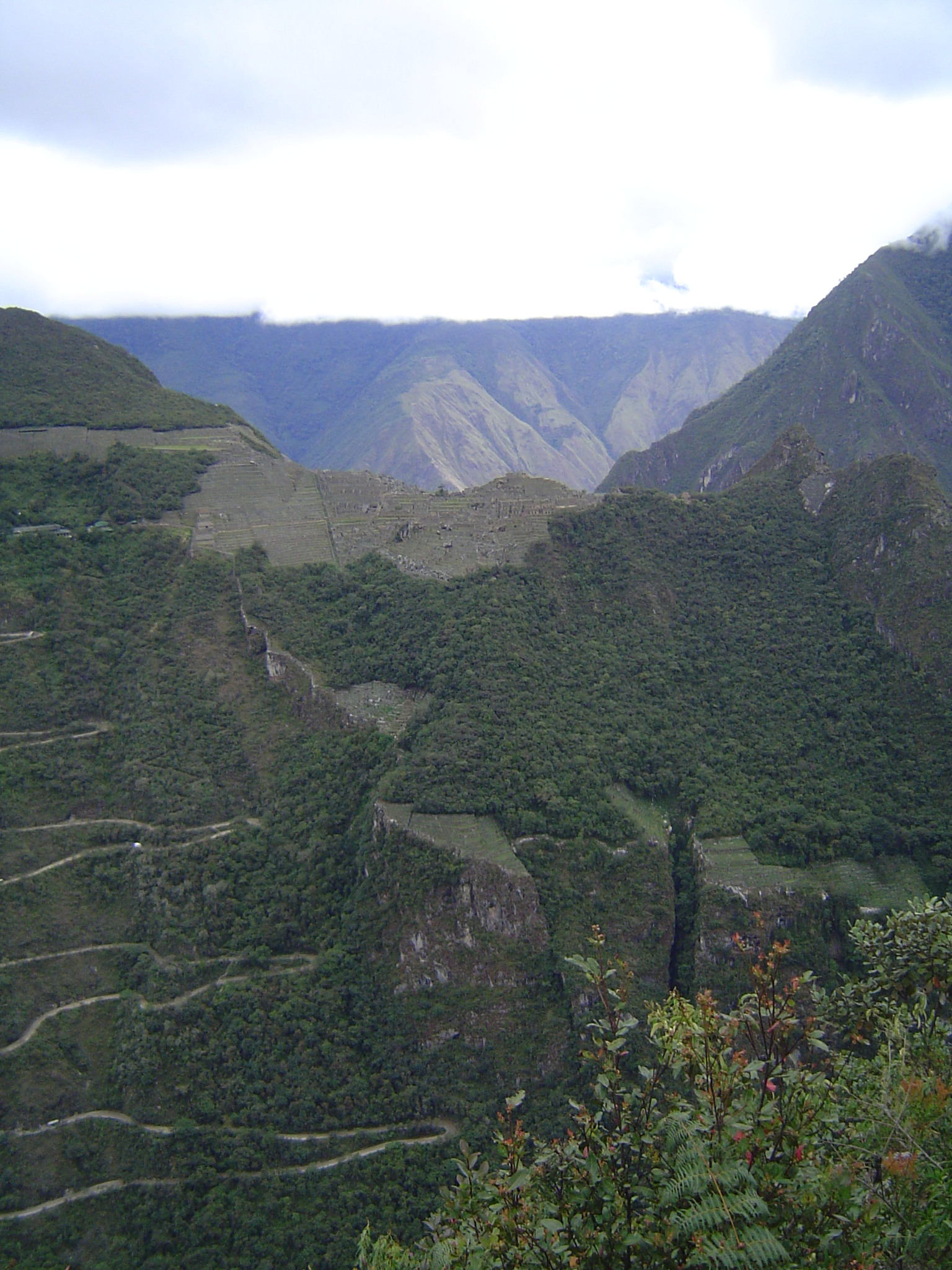
View of Machu Picchu from the summit of Putucusi

== See also ==
- Iperu, tourist information and assistance
- Tourism in Peru
