= Quriwayrachina, Anta =

Archaeological site in Peru

Quriwayrachina
- Location: Peru, Cusco Region, Anta Province
- Region: Andes

Quriwayrachina or Quri Wayrachina (Quechua quri gold, wayrachina a special oven for smelting metal, "oven for smelting gold") is an archaeological site with agricultural terraces in Peru. It is situated in the Cusco Region, Anta Province. The terraces lie about 4 kilometres (2.5 mi) north of the terraces of Zurite.

Hiram Bingham III visited the site in April 1915, and by Paul Fejos in 1940

== See also ==
- Killarumiyuq
- Tampukancha
- Tarawasi
- Wat'a
