= Anta =

Anta may refer to:

== Biology ==
- Fava d'anta, a tree found in Brazil
- South American tapir, known in Portuguese as 'anta'
- Phytelephas seemannii, known in Quechua and Choco as 'anta'

== Places ==
=== Peru ===
- Anta, Ancash, a village in Carhuaz Province, Ancash Region
- Anta, Cusco Region, a town in southern Peru
- Anta District (disambiguation), several districts
- Anta Province, in the Cusco Region
- Anta (Canchis), a mountain in the Canchis Province, Cusco Region
- Anta Mantay, a mountain in Lima Region
- Anta Maqana, a mountain in Huancavelica Region
- Anta P'unqu, a mountain in Quispicanchi Province, Cusco Region
- Anta Q'asa, a mountain spanning the Junín and Lima Regions
- Anta Ranra, a mountain in Lima Region

=== Other places ===
- Anta Department, in Salta Province, Argentina
- Anta, a civil parish of the municipality of Espinho, Portugal

== Other uses ==
- Anta (architecture), posts or pillars on either side of a doorway or entrance of a Greek temple
- American National Theater and Academy (ANTA)
- Anta Sports, Chinese sportswear manufacturer
- Anta Livitsanou, Greek actress
- Australian National Travel Association (ANTA or A.N.T.A)
- Anta, a variety of the Upper Morehead language of Papua New-Guinea

== See also ==
- Ananta (disambiguation)
- Antah, a city and a municipality in Baran district in the state of Rajasthan, India
- Antal (given name)
- Antal (surname)
- Antão, name
- Anth (disambiguation)
