= Antão =

Antão or Antao is a Portuguese given name that's equivalent to Anthony or Antonio in use in Portugal, Brazil, South Africa, Namibia, Angola and Mozambique and a surname. Notable people with this name include the following:

== Given name ==
- Antao D'Souza (born 17 January 1939), Goan cricketer
- Antão de Almada, 7th Count of Avranches (c. 1573 – 1644), Portuguese national hero
- Antão de Almada, 12th Count of Avranches (1718 – 1797), Portugues political administrator
- Antão Gonçalves (15th-century), Portuguese explorer
- Antão Martins Homem (1450s–1531), Portuguese nobleman

== Surname ==
- John da Silva Antao (born 1933), Portuguese priest
- Walfrido Antão (fl. 1950s-1980s), Goan writer

== See also ==
- Abtao (disambiguation)
- ANAO (disambiguation)
- Anta (disambiguation)
- Antah, city in India
- Antal (surname)
- Antar (disambiguation)
- Anto (name)
