= Yanaqucha (Anta) =

Mountain in Peru

- Location within Peru

Highest point
- Elevation: 4,920 m (16,140 ft)
- Coordinates: 13°23′04″S 72°19′32″W

Naming
- Language of name: Quechua

Geography
- Location: Peru, Cusco Region, Anta Province
- Parent range: Andes

Yanaqucha (Quechua yana black, qucha lake, "black lake", Hispanicized spelling Yanacocha) is a 4,920-metre-high (16,142 ft) mountain in the eastern extensions of the Willkapampa mountain range in the Andes of Peru on the border of the districts of Ancahuasi and Huarocondo in Anta Province, Cusco Region. It is north of a little lake of that name; the lake is at 13°23′35″S 72°19′15″W. The mountain and the lake lie southeast of Muyuq.
