= Wat'a, Cusco =

Archaeological site in Peru

Wat'a
- Interactive map of Wat'a
- 13°20′49″S 72°14′44″W
- Location: Peru
- Region: Cusco Region, Anta Province

Wat'a (Quechua for island) is an archaeological zone in Peru. It is situated in the Cusco Region, Anta Province, Huarocondo District, north of Huarocondo. The site consists of five sections,

- Wat'aq'asa (Wataqasa) in the southwest and west of the area,
- Willkapata (Willcapata), east of Wat'aq'asa,
- Qhawarina, north of Willkapata
- Qullqa, in the extreme east of the archaeological site of Wat'a,
- Saksaywaman Pata, northeast of the village Huarocondo.

Saksaywaman Pata was declared a National Cultural Heritage of Peru by Resolución Directoral Nacional No. 519/INC- 2003.

== See also ==
- Kachimayu
- Killarumiyuq
- Sinqa
- Tampukancha
- Tarawasi
- Wat'a, Huánuco
