= Kachimayu =

Kachimayu or Kachi Mayu (Quechua for "salt river", hispanicized spellings Cachimayo, Cachimayu, Cachi Mayu) may refer to:

== Rivers ==
- Kachimayu (Ayacucho-Huancavelica) in the Ayacucho and Huancavelica Regions, Peru
- Kachimayu (Cusco) in the Cusco Region, Peru
- Kachimayu (Huancavelica) in the Huancavelica Region, Peru
- Kachimayu, one of the headwaters of the river Willkamayu in the Ayacucho Region, Peru
- Kachi Mayu (Oruro) in the Oruro Department, Bolivia
- Kachi Mayu (Chuquisaca) in the Chuquisaca Department, Bolivia

== Places ==
- Cachimayo District and its seat Cachimayo in the Cusco Region, Peru
