= Agustín Lizárraga =

Peruvian explorer and farmer (1865–1912)

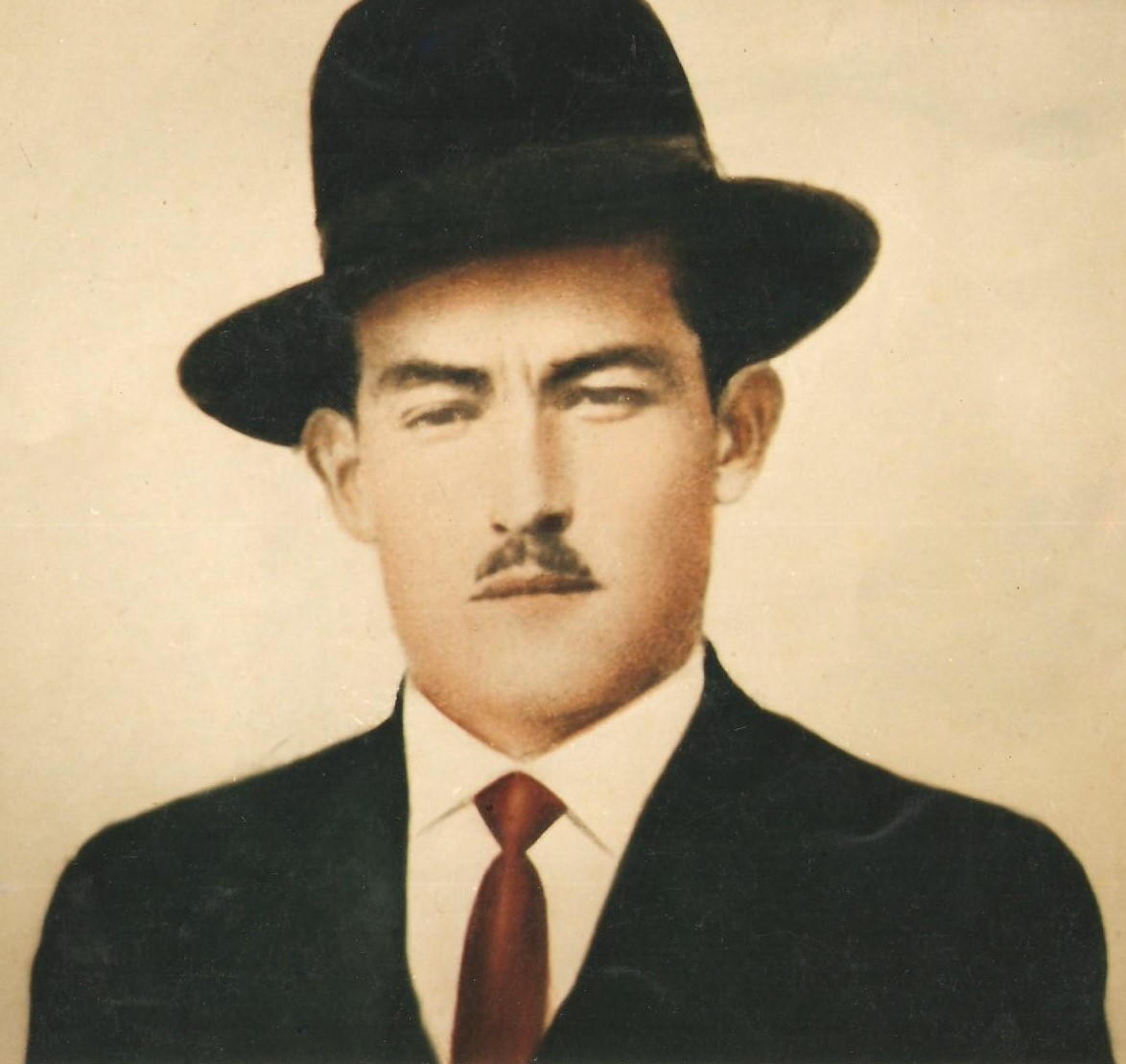
- Portrait
- Born: Agustín Lizárraga Ruiz; 12 June 1865; Mollepata, Cusco, Peru
- Died: 11 February 1912 (aged 46); Urubamba River, Peru
- Cause of death: Drowning
- Occupations: Explorer and farmer
- Known for: Discovering Machu Picchu prior to Hiram Bingham on 14 July 1902.
- Spouse: Rosa Lizárraga

Agustín Lizárraga Ruiz (Spanish: [aɣusˈtin liˈsaraɣa] 12 June 1865 – 11 February 1912) was a Peruvian explorer and farmer who visited the Inca site of Machu Picchu on 14 July 1902, nine years before American explorer Hiram Bingham brought it to international attention.

== Biography ==
"Agustín Lizárraga is the discoverer of Machu Picchu, and lived at San Miguel Bridge just before passing"

— Hiram Bingham in his diary on July 25, 1911

=== Early life ===
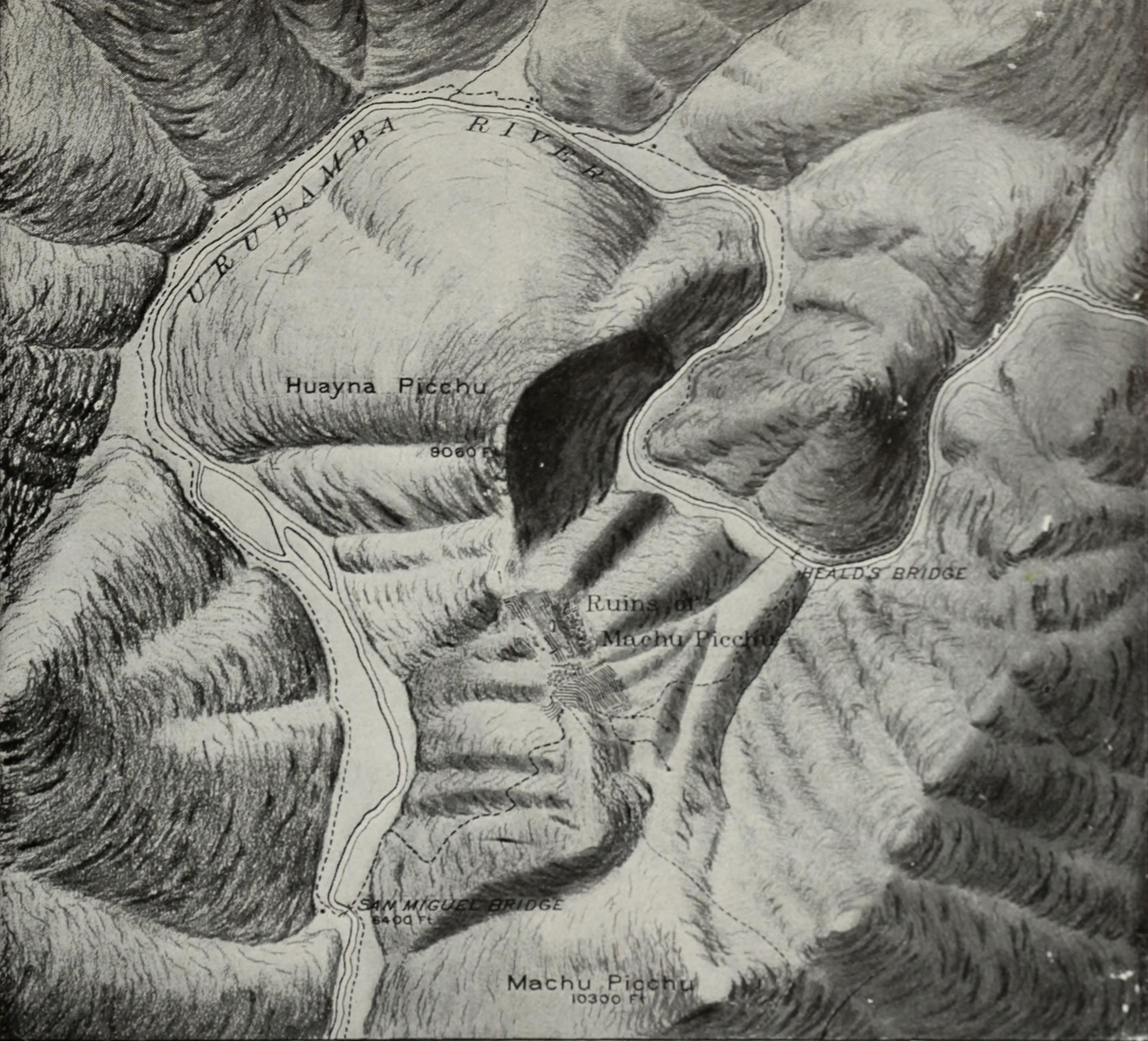
1912 map of Machu Picchu and its vicinity showing San Miguel Bridge (lower left), near Agustín Lizárraga’s former residence.

He was born in Mollepata, Peru, in 1865. At the age of 18 he left his hometown to avoid enlisting in the army. Subsequently, Lizárraga and his brother Ángel Mariano took up residence in the Aobamba Valley, west of Machu Picchu, in the department of Cuzco. At the end of the 19th century, trade between Quillabamba and Cusco thrived, and the main route for arrieros transporting coffee and coca leaves followed the course of the Urubamba River. With this in mind, the Lizárraga brothers decided to strategically settle halfway along that trade route, near the San Miguel Bridge and in the Intihuatana area. There, both of them dedicated themselves to cultivating vegetables, corn, and granadilla.

Over time, the Lizárraga brothers became the top farmers in the area and became well-acquainted with the Ochoa family, who owned land near what is now Machu Picchu. They worked for the Ochoa family on the Hacienda Collpani. Lizárraga was also appointed as a tax collector by the Ministry of Transport, entrusted with the oversight of all the bridges spanning the distance from Cusco to Quillabamba.

=== Machu Picchu expedition ===
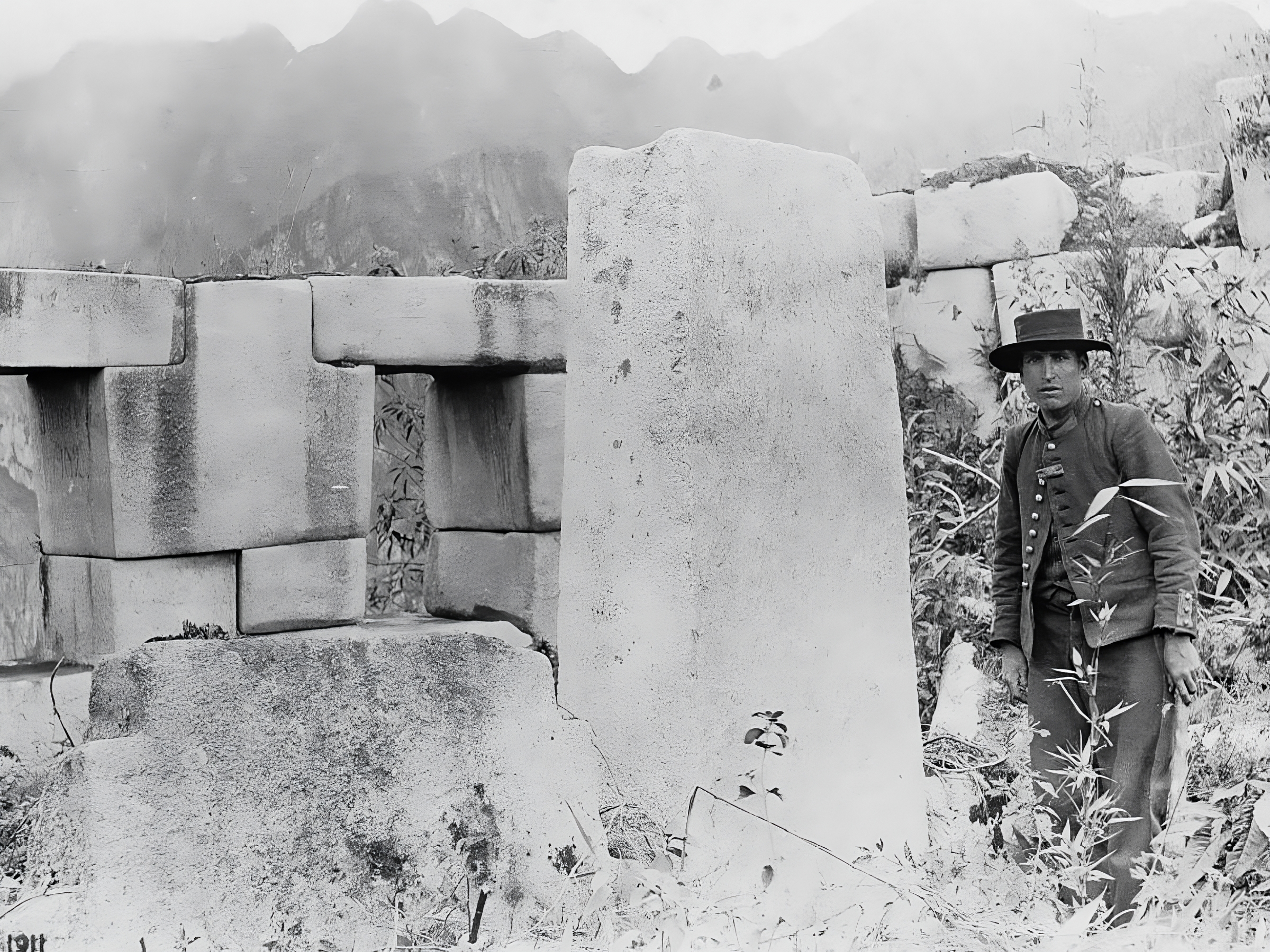
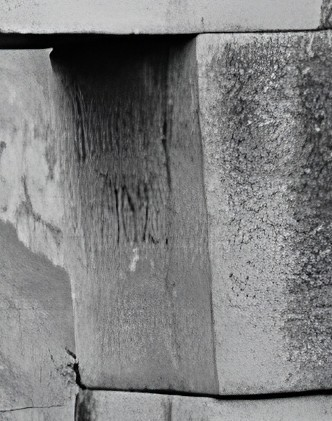
Agustín Lizárraga's charcoal inscription, 'A. Lizárraga 1902', on the central window of the Temple of the Three Windows

On 14 July 1902, Agustín Lizárraga, renowned for his skill in "scaling the most inaccessible places" and "defying all obstacles," led an expedition in search of new lands for cultivation, accompanied by workers from the hacienda Collpani. His cousin Enrique Palma, the hacienda's administrator; Toribio Recharte, a laborer of Lizárraga, and Gabino Sánchez joined him. After several hours of walking through the undergrowth, they came across stone walls of ancient buildings. They spent the day at the citadel, discovering an increasing number of buildings during his exploration. Lizárraga observed in astonishment and intuited that it could hold value. He then made an inscription with charcoal on one of the stones of the Temple of the Three Windows, bearing his surname and the year: "A. Lizárraga 1902." This inscription was later discovered by Bingham in 1911 and by José G. Cosío in January 1912. Later, Bingham ordered its removal citing preservation reasons.

The following year Agustín realized that the lands of the citadel were ideal for farming, which is why he recruited the Mollepata families of Toribio Recharte and later, Anacleto Álvarez, to settle there.

Between 1904 and 1905 José María Ochoa Ladrón de Guevara, son of the owner of the hacienda Collpani, Justo Zenón Ochoa, persuaded Lizárraga to inform the discovery of Machu Picchu in Cuzco. Although Lizárraga feared losing his "fertile and abundantly productive farmland," he accepted Ochoa's proposal after being offered new lands in Collpani Grande. They began spreading the news to friends, family, and several prominent intellectuals, including his brother Justo Antonio Ochoa Ladrón de Guevara, who informed university professors at the National University of San Antonio Abad in Cuzco and the American rector Albert Giesecke.

=== Death ===
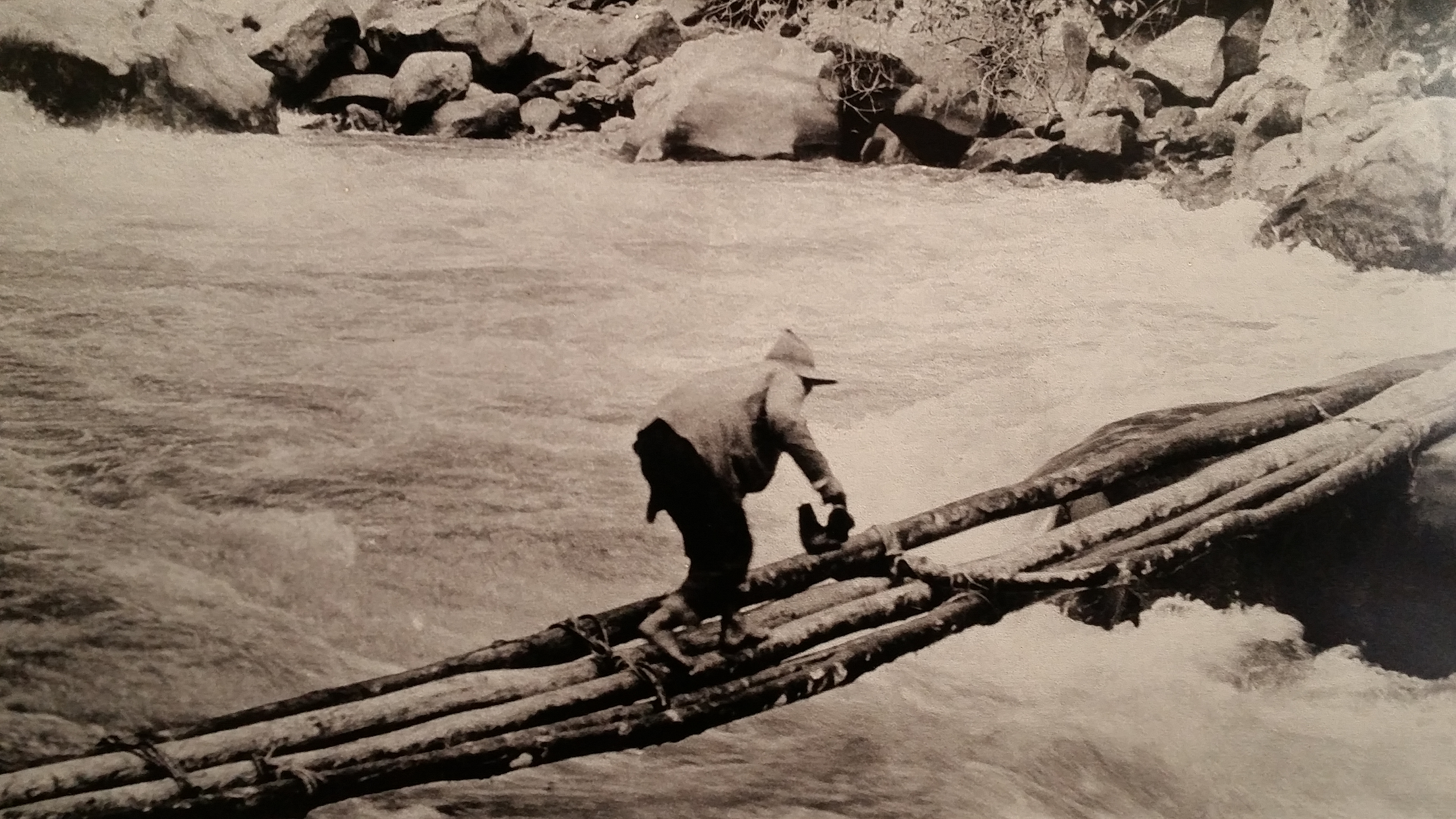
Melchor Arteaga crosses the Urubamba River on a log bridge reminiscent of the one where Lizárraga fell in 1912.

In February 1912 Agustín Lizárraga drowned in the Vilcanota River; his body was never recovered. According to Peruvian scholar José Gabriel Cosio, the death occurred at 4 p.m. when Lizárraga was crossing a "dangerous little bridge" on his way to his corn fields. He fell from the middle of the bridge and, being accompanied only by a child, could not receive help. Despite a search, his body could not be found. Cosio adds regarding this:

Poor Lizárraga! He has died, as twenty or thirty will die, and as hundreds of people must have died, because the bridge that Mr. Ochoa tells me about, and of which there are several along the Vilcanota, cannot be called such. They are sticks or logs tied with ropes and twine that are thrown from one side to the other of the river without walls or safety support.

— José Gabriel Cosio

== Awards and honors ==
In 2002 former Mayor of Cusco Daniel Estrada submitted a motion before the Congress, seeking official recognition on behalf of the Nation for citizens Agustín Lizárraga, Gabino Sánchez, Justo Ochoa, and Enrique Palma as the discoverers of Machu Picchu. This motion also proposed paying homage to "eternally commemorate — in the manner of the era — the Peruvian presence at Machu Picchu, on the 14th of July, 1902."

Subsequently, in July 2011, in light of the centennial anniversary of the scientific discovery of Machu Picchu, the Provincial Municipality of Cusco (Cusco City Hall) posthumously bestowed upon Agustín Lizárraga the Medalla Centenario de Machupicchu para el mundo (Centenary Medal of Machu Picchu). This distinction was rooted in his "merits and contributions to the discovery of the Historical Sanctuary of Machupicchu."
