= Anta District =

Anta District may refer to:

- Anta District, Acobamba in Peru
- Anta District, Anta in Peru
- Anta District, Carhuaz in Peru
