= Kachimayu (Cusco) =

Coordinates: 13°16′25″S 72°13′8″W

- Etymology: Quechua

Location
- Country: Peru
- Region: Cusco Region

Physical characteristics
- Mouth: Willkamayu

Kachimayu (Quechua kachi salt, mayu river, "salt river", Hispanicized spelling Cachimayo) is a river in Peru located in the Cusco Region, Anta Province. It belongs to the Willkanuta watershed.

Kachimayu originates in the mountains near Cusco. It flows through the districts Cachimayo, Pucyura and Anta, along the border of the Zurite District and through the Huarocondo District. Its direction is mainly to the west as it flows through the plain (pampa) of Anta. One of its main tributaries is Pitumayu (Pitumayo) which comes from the Zurite District in the east. Now the river turns to the north. Behind Huarocondo the river changes its name to Huarocondo. It reaches the Willkanuta River as a left tributary between the towns Ollantaytambo and Urubamba.

== See also ==
- Wat'a
