= Limatambo District =

Coordinates: 13.4795°S 72.4442°W

Limatambo Lima Tampu
- District
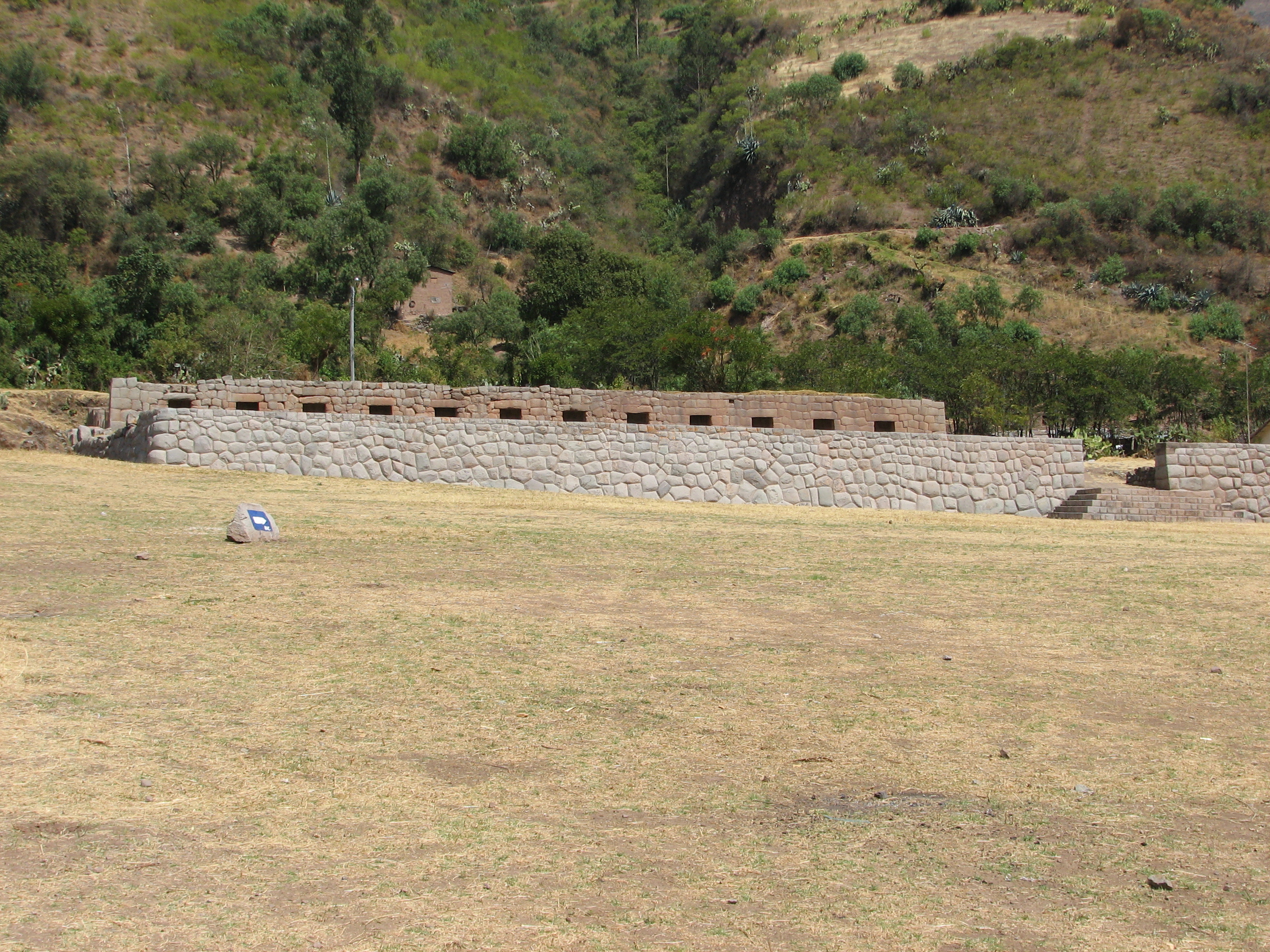
- Tarawasi
- Interactive map of Limatambo
- Country: Peru
- Region: Cusco
- Province: Anta
- Capital: Limatambo

Government
  - Mayor: Jesús Vargas Santos

Area
  - Total: 512.92 km^{2} (198.04 sq mi)
- Elevation: 2,554 m (8,379 ft)

Population (2005 census)
  - Total: 8,615
  - Density: 16.80/km^{2} (43.50/sq mi)
- Time zone: UTC-5 (PET)
- UBIGEO: 080306

Limatambo District is one of nine districts of the province Anta in Peru.

== Geography ==
One of the highest peaks of the district is Hatun Q'asa at 5,338 m (17,513 ft). Other mountains are listed below:

- Anawillka Q'asa
- Anta Sirk'a
- Iskuyuq Punta
- Kuntur Marka
- Kuyuq
- Llama Wasi
- Llamaylla
- Muru Saywa
- Muyuq
- Pikchu Urqu
- Pitu Phaqcha
- Pukar
- Qullpa Qhata
- Ruq'a Pampa
- Sikun Punta
- Silla Q'asa
- Tiklla
- Tinkuq
- T'asta Q'asa
- Uma
- Uman Chunta
- Uqhu Pampa
- Wakayuq Pampa
- Waman Marka
- Waqra Q'asa
- Yana Pata

== Ethnic groups ==
The people in the district are mainly indigenous citizens of Quechua descent. Quechua is the language which the majority of the population (79.74%) learnt to speak in childhood, 19.63% of the residents started speaking using the Spanish language (2007 Peru Census).

== See also ==
- Tarawasi
