= Ancahuasi District =

Ancahuasi Ankawasi
- District
- Interactive map of Ancahuasi
- Coordinates: 13.4557°S 72.3005°W
- Country: Peru
- Region: Cusco
- Province: Anta
- Founded: September 15, 1986
- Capital: Ancahuasi

Government
  - Mayor: Ubaldo Kuncho Rimachi

Area
  - Total: 123.58 km^{2} (47.71 sq mi)
- Elevation: 3,435 m (11,270 ft)

Population (2005 census)
  - Total: 7,543
  - Density: 61.04/km^{2} (158.1/sq mi)
- Time zone: UTC-5 (PET)
- UBIGEO: 080302

Ancahuasi, Quechua Ankawasi (anka eagle, wasi house, "eagle house"), is one of nine districts of the province Anta in Peru.

== Ethnic groups ==
The people in the district are mainly indigenous citizens of Quechua descent. Quechua is the language which the majority of the population (84.86%) learnt to speak in childhood, 14.89 % of the residents started speaking using the Spanish language (2007 Peru Census).

== See also ==
- Killarumiyuq
- Yanaqucha
