= Jatunjasa (Cusco) =

Mountain in Peru

- Incachiriasca
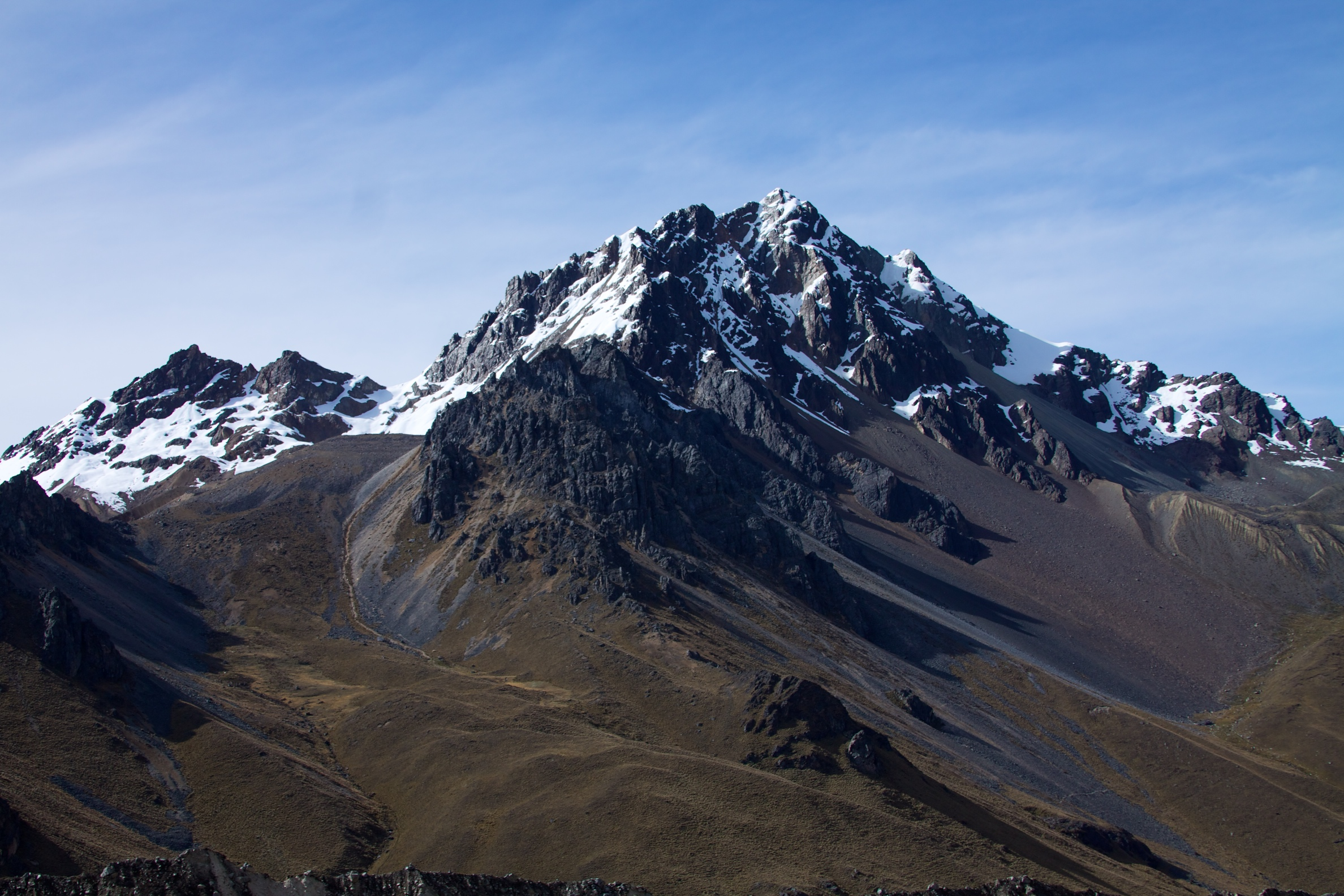
- Jatunjasa (center) as seen from the northwest

Highest point
- Elevation: 5,338 m (17,513 ft)
- Coordinates: 13°22′05″S 72°32′25″W

Naming
- Language of name: Quechua

Geography
- Location within Peru
- Location: Peru, Cusco Region
- Parent range: Andes, Vilcabamba

Jatunjasa (possibly from Quechua hatun big, q'asa mountain pass, "big mountain pass"), also known as Incachiriasca (possibly from Inka Inca, chiriyasqa cooled, "cooled Inca"), is a 5,338-metre-high (17,513 ft) mountain in the Vilcabamba mountain range in the Andes of Peru. It is located in the Cusco Region, Anta Province, Limatambo District, and in the Urubamba Province, Ollantaytambo District. Jatunjasa lies south of Salcantay.

Incachiriasca is also the name of the Salcantay glacier at 13°21′10″S 72°32′05″W between Salcantay and Jatunjasa.
