= Abtao =

Abtao may refer to:

- Abtao Island, a Chilean island
- Battle of Abtao, an 1866 naval battle between Spain and the allied Peru and Chile
- Abtao-class submarine, a Peruvian Navy submarine class
- BAP Abtao, Peruvian submarine of the Abtao class and a museum ship
- Chilean corvette Abtao, a Chilean Navy corvette

== See also ==
- Antão
