= Pucyura District =

Coordinates: 13.4793°S 72.1118°W

Pucyura
- District
- Interactive map of Pucyura
- Country: Peru
- Region: Cusco
- Province: Anta
- Founded: September 30, 1942
- Capital: Pucyura

Government
  - Mayor: Tommy Loaiza Serrano

Area
  - Total: 37.75 km^{2} (14.58 sq mi)
- Elevation: 3,351 m (10,994 ft)

Population (2005 census)
  - Total: 3,912
  - Density: 103.6/km^{2} (268.4/sq mi)
- Time zone: UTC-5 (PET)
- UBIGEO: 080308

Pucyura District is one of nine districts of the province Anta in Peru.

== Ethnic groups ==
The people in the district are mainly indigenous citizens of Quechua descent. Quechua is the language which the majority of the population (55.83%) learnt to speak in childhood, 43.57% of the residents started speaking using the Spanish language (2007 Peru Census).

== See also ==
- Kachimayu
