= Walfrido Antão =

Indian writer

- Born: Arossim, Goa, Portuguese India
- Writing career
- Language: Portuguese
- Period: 1950s-1980s

Walfrido Antão was an Indian prolific cronista and short story writer in the Portuguese-language Goan press, becoming particularly active as this tradition breathed its last. The crónica is a journalistic form common in Iberia and Latin America and which was widely cultivated in Portuguese Goa. It can be roughly defined as a literary text combining elements of the short story, the memoir and the opinion editorial. Born in Arossim, Antão contributed several hundred such articles to O Heraldo and Diário da Noite from the late 1950s until the demise or Anglicisation of these papers.

== Crónicas ==
Antão's crónicas reflect his preoccupations with environmental concerns, Goan culture, the future of the Portuguese language in the territory, and issues related to Alcoholics Anonymous, of which he was one of the first promoters in Goa

== Short stories ==
Antão's stories, like the rest of his journalistic output, seem influenced by what we could loosely term existentialist concerns, such as alienation, freedom, absurdity, authenticity and self-determination. Indeed, anecdote holds that Antão was an acquaintance of Sartre's in Paris at the height of existentialism's influence and prestige. Yet Antão's treatment of existential themes is always mediated by his engagement with Goan actuality, his concerns about the dissolution of Goan identity and the destruction of the Goan landscape. Earlier, before the environment became an issue, he allowed his brother-in-law to extract sand from the dunes on his ancestral property - that was later sold to Park Hyatt Resort, Arossim. The extent to which the author himself was touched by existential despair, which here could be conceptualized as a loss of hope concerning the signification and transformation of life, is open to debate. His texts certainly seem delicately balanced between positive and negative elements.

== Samples of Antão's writing (in Portuguese) ==
- Diálogo: A Morte e a Vida ou um Bilhete a uma Maria Enfermeira
- Telo de Mascarenhas, ou Um Padrão Ocidental na Situação Indiana (see [Telo de Mascarenhas]
- Walfrido Antão - A nostalgia na obra de [Vimala Devi] (see [Vimala Devi]
- De Mobor a Agonda (Canácona) ou Desenvolvimento, Para Quem?
- Aquele Suspiro Malando ou o 'Naturismo' de António Ataíde
