= Cachimayo District =

Coordinates: 13.4791°S 72.0659°W

Cachimayo Kachimayu
- District
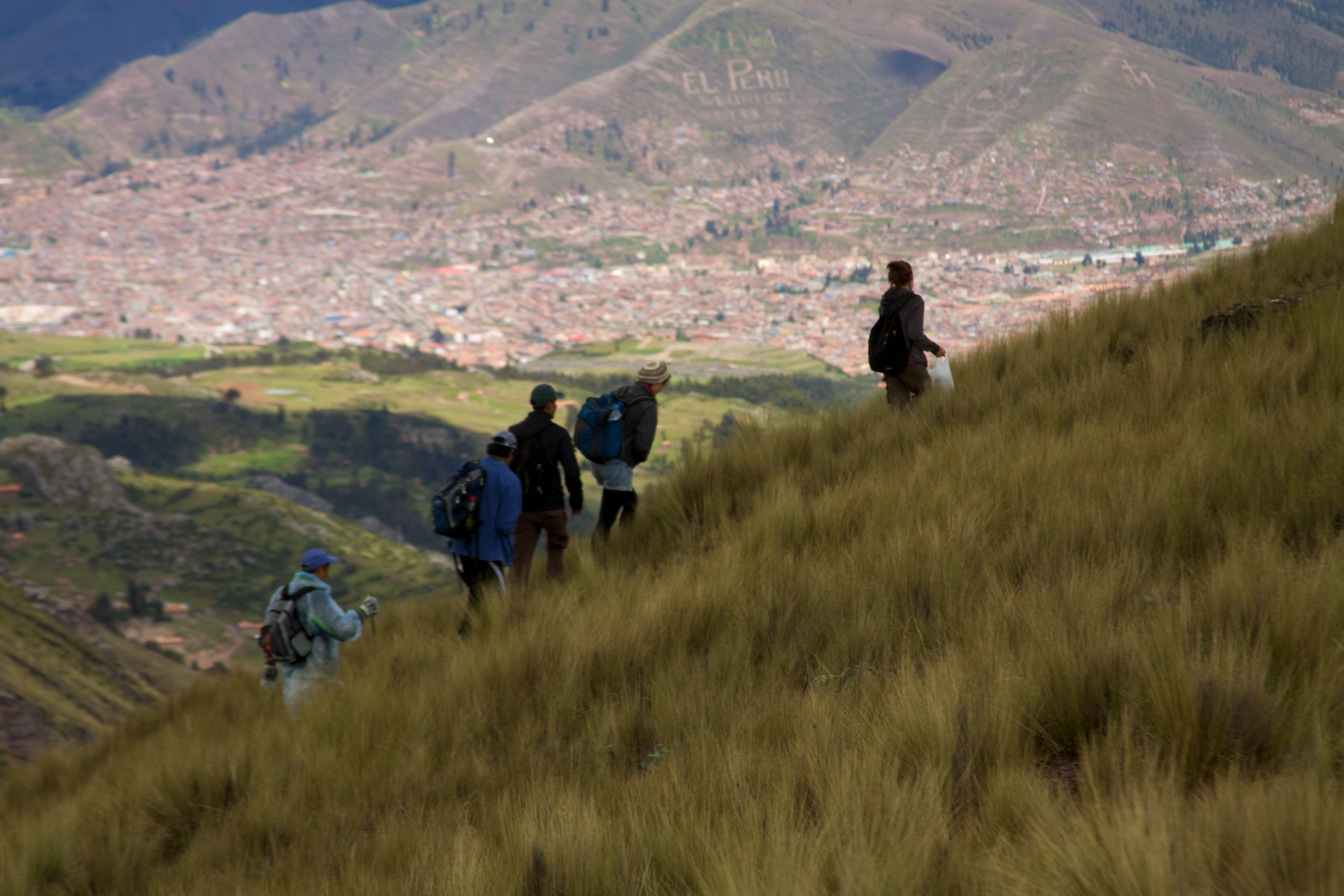
- Cusco as seen from the Cachimayo District north of the town (near Chaypa and the mountain Sirk'a)
- Interactive map of Cachimayo; Kachimayu
- Country: Peru
- Region: Cusco
- Province: Anta
- Founded: May 15, 1970
- Capital: Cachimayo

Government
  - Mayor: Cirilo Quispe La Torre

Area
  - Total: 43.28 km^{2} (16.71 sq mi)
- Elevation: 3,442 m (11,293 ft)

Population (2005 census)
  - Total: 1,920
  - Density: 44.4/km^{2} (115/sq mi)
- Time zone: UTC-5 (PET)
- UBIGEO: 080303

Cachimayo District is one of nine districts of the province Anta in Peru.

The district is named after the Kachimayu (Quechua for "salt river") which crosses the district from west to east.

== Ethnic groups ==
The people in the district are mainly indigenous citizens of Quechua descent. Quechua is the language which the majority of the population (50.34%) learnt to speak in childhood, 49.41% of the residents started speaking using the Spanish language (2007 Peru Census).

== See also ==
- Sinqa
