= Mollepata District, Anta =

Mollepata Mullipata
- District
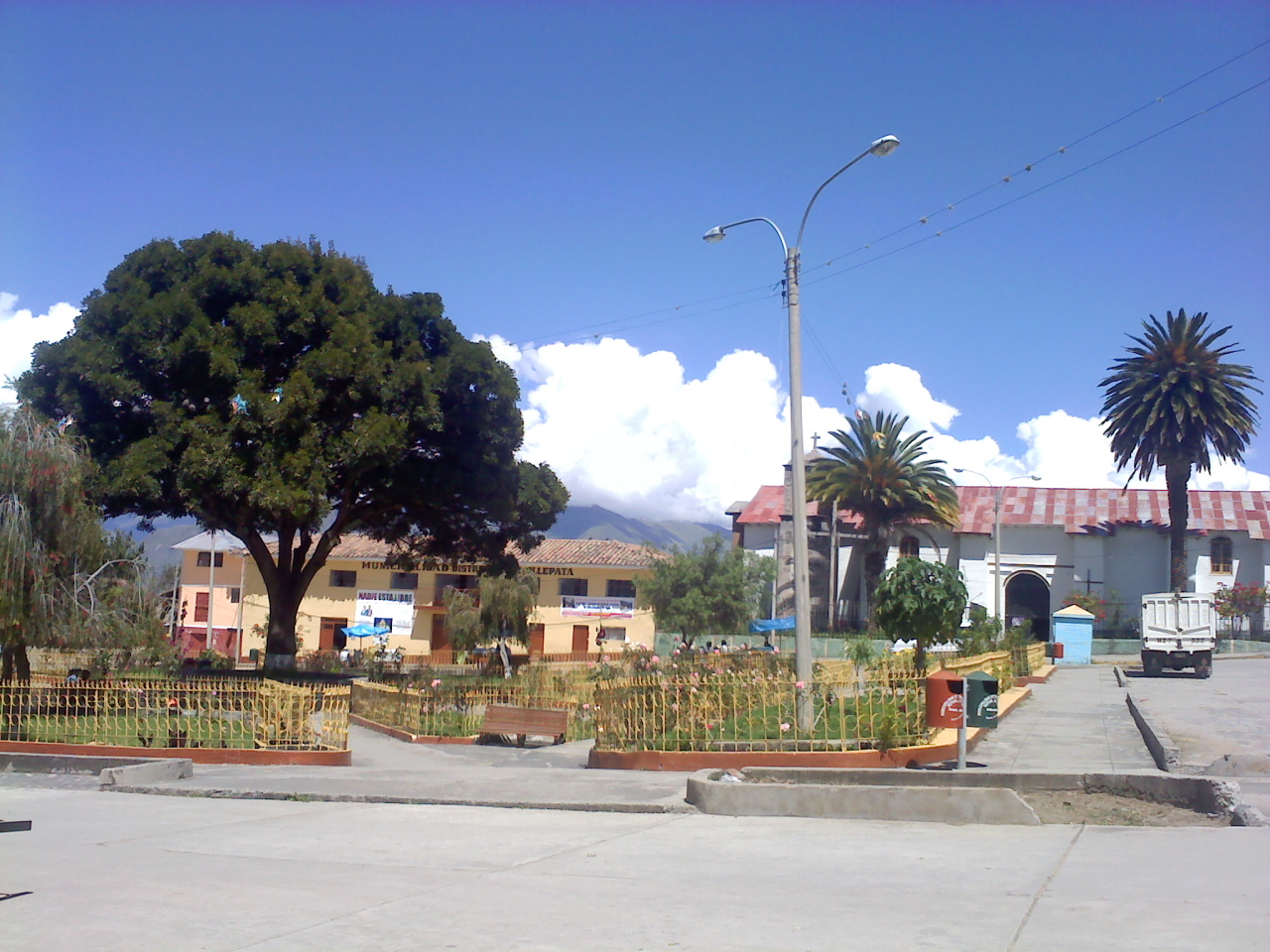
- Main square of Mollepata

- Location within Peru
- Coordinates: 13°28′S 72°38′W
- Country: Peru
- Region: Cusco
- Province: Anta
- Founded: April 29, 1929
- Capital: Mollepata

Government
  - Mayor: Marco Antonio Chacon Delgado

Area
  - Total: 284.48 km^{2} (109.84 sq mi)
- Elevation: 2,803 m (9,196 ft)

Population (2005 census)
  - Total: 3,543
  - Density: 12.45/km^{2} (32.26/sq mi)
- Time zone: UTC-5 (PET)
- UBIGEO: 080307

Mollepata District is one of nine districts of the province Anta, in the Department of Cuzco, in Peru. The Mollepata trek or Salkantay trek, an alternative route to the Inca Trail to Machu Picchu, passes through the Vilcabamba Range from Mollepata to Santa Teresa. The Mollepata trek is considered harder than the Classic trek because of its height and remoteness.

== Ethnic groups ==
The people in the district are mainly indigenous citizens of Quechua descent. Quechua is the language which the majority of the population (74.13%) learnt to speak in childhood, 24.83% of the residents started speaking using the Spanish language (2007 Peru Census).
