= Anta District, Anta =

Coordinates: 13.4716°S 72.1488°W

Anta District
- District
- Interactive map of Anta District
- Country: Peru
- Region: Cusco
- Province: Anta
- Capital: Anta

Government
  - Mayor: Wilbert Gabriel Rozas Beltran

Area
  - Total: 202.58 km^{2} (78.22 sq mi)
- Elevation: 3,337 m (10,948 ft)

Population (2005 census)
  - Total: 17,259
  - Density: 85.196/km^{2} (220.66/sq mi)
- Time zone: UTC-5 (PET)
- UBIGEO: 080301

Anta District is one of nine districts of the Anta Province in Peru.

== Geography ==
The most important river of the district is the Kachi Mayu (Quechua for "salt river"). It crosses the district from east to west.

One of the highest peaks of the district is Mullu Waman at 4,200 m (13,800 ft). Other mountains are listed below:

- Aqu Q'asa
- Aqu Wayllay
- Imillay
- Iskay Patayuq
- Llawlli Kancha
- Sayaq Rumi
- T'uriyuq
- Wanakawri (Anta-Urubamba)
- Yawar Quchayuq
- Yura Qaqa

== Ethnic groups ==
The people in the district are mainly indigenous citizens of Quechua descent. Quechua is the language which the majority of the population (56.00%) learnt to speak in childhood, 43.75% of the residents started speaking using the Spanish language (2007 Peru Census).

== Subdistrict ==
- Anta (Anta)

== Canton ==
- Anta East (San José de Anta)
- Anta West (Anta)
