= Anta, Cusco Region =

Anta
- Town
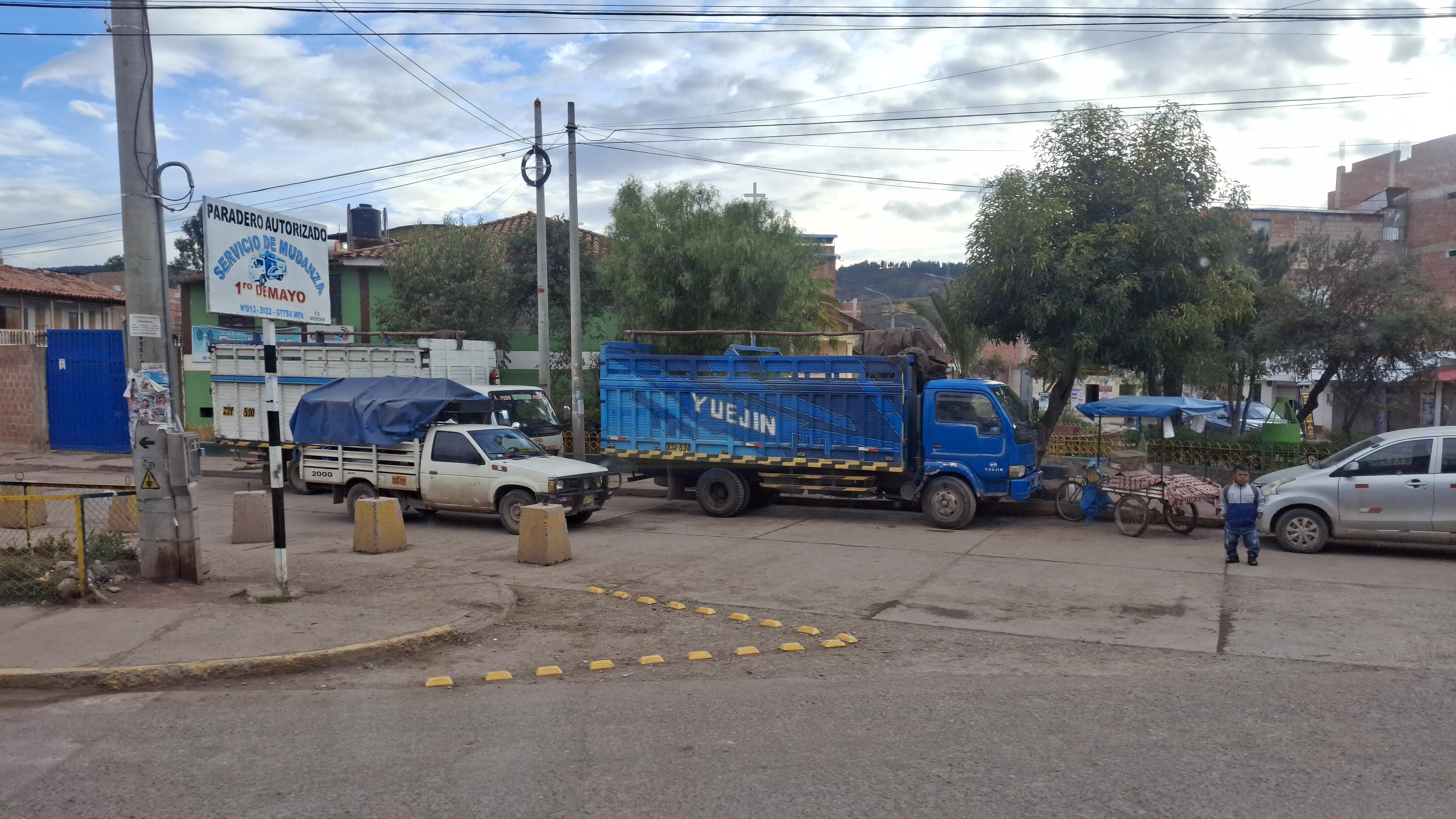

- Location within Peru
- Coordinates: 13.471°S 72.149°W
- Country: Peru
- Region: Cusco
- Province: Anta
- District: Anta
- Time zone: UTC-5 (PET)

Anta is a town in southern Peru, capital of Anta Province in Cusco Region.

== Climate ==
Climate data for Anta Ancachuro, elevation 3,324 m (10,906 ft), (1991–2020)
Month	Jan	Feb	Mar	Apr	May	Jun	Jul	Aug	Sep	Oct	Nov	Dec	Year
Mean daily maximum °C (°F)	20.1 (68.2)	19.9 (67.8)	20.1 (68.2)	20.5 (68.9)	20.8 (69.4)	20.6 (69.1)	20.6 (69.1)	21.0 (69.8)	20.9 (69.6)	21.0 (69.8)	21.3 (70.3)	20.4 (68.7)	20.6 (69.1)
Mean daily minimum °C (°F)	5.8 (42.4)	5.9 (42.6)	5.4 (41.7)	3.2 (37.8)	−1.4 (29.5)	−4.0 (24.8)	−4.3 (24.3)	−2.4 (27.7)	0.6 (33.1)	3.4 (38.1)	4.5 (40.1)	5.3 (41.5)	1.8 (35.3)
Average precipitation mm (inches)	192.1 (7.56)	190.9 (7.52)	147.5 (5.81)	39.1 (1.54)	8.1 (0.32)	6.4 (0.25)	7.3 (0.29)	9.5 (0.37)	20.7 (0.81)	72.5 (2.85)	98.9 (3.89)	171.2 (6.74)	964.2 (37.95)
Source: National Meteorology and Hydrology Service of Peru
