= Killarumiyuq =

Archaeological site in Peru

- Interactive map of Killarumiyuq
- 13°26′42.74″S 72°18′35.74″W
- Location: Peru, Cusco Region, Anta Province
- Region: Andes

Killarumiyuq (Quechua killa moon, rumi stone, -yuq a suffix to indicate ownership, "the one with a moon stone", Hispanicized and mixed spellings Killarumiyoc, Quillarumiyoc, Quillarumiyoq, also Killarumiyoq) is an archaeological park in Peru. It is located in the Cusco Region, Anta Province, Ancahuasi District. The site was declared a National Cultural Heritage (Patrimonio Cultural) of Peru by Resolución Directoral Nacional No. 150/INC-2003 of March 25, 2003.

== See also ==
- Tampukancha
