= ANAO =

Anao or ANAO may refer to:

- Anao, Tarlac, a municipality in the Philippines
- Australian National Audit Office (ANAO), the national auditor for the Parliament and Government of Australia
