= Anta province =

Coordinates: 13.480167°S 72.111245°W

Anta
- Province
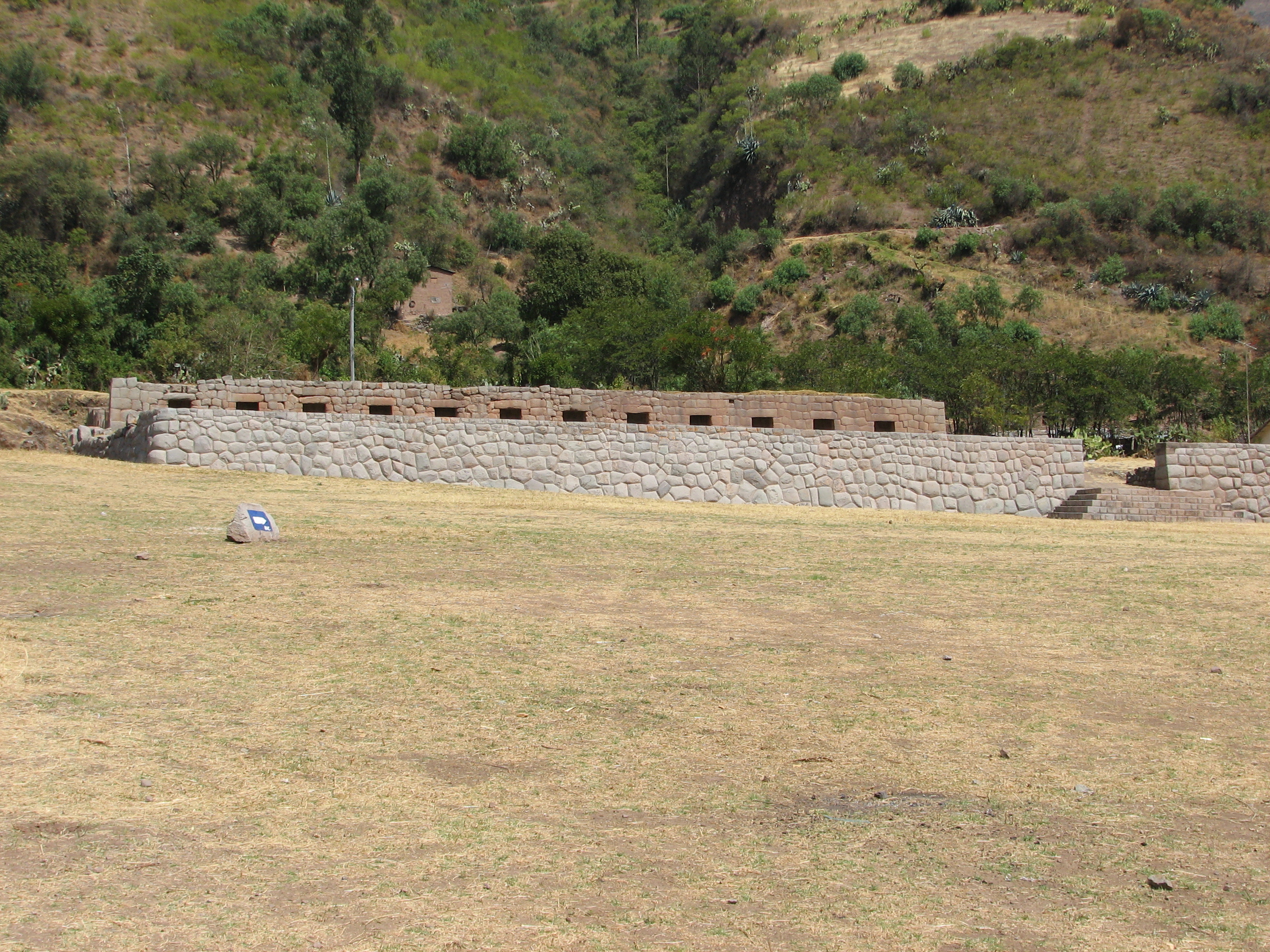
- The archaeological site of Tarawasi in the province of Anta

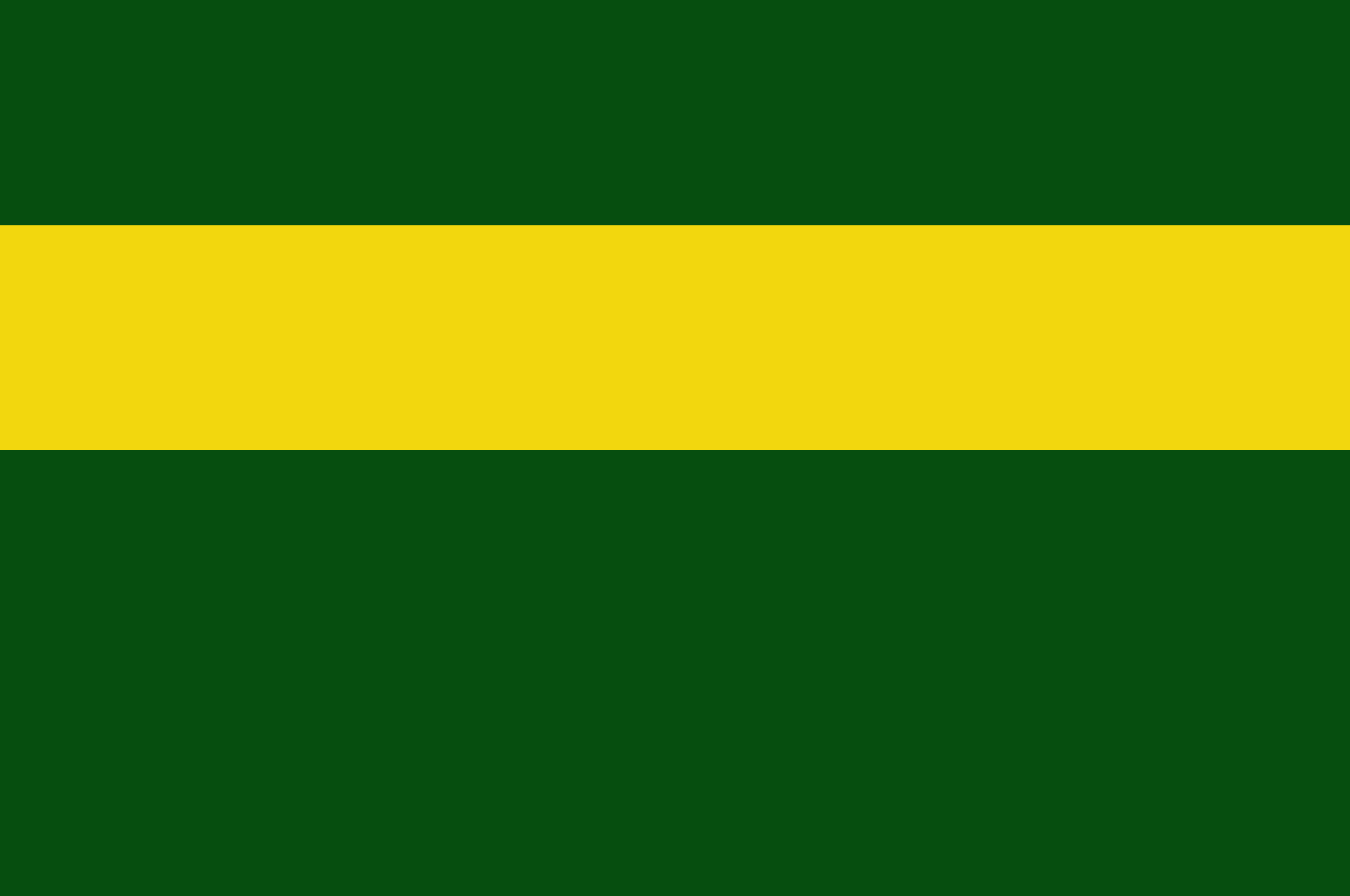
- Flag

- Location of Anta in the Cusco Region
- Country: Peru
- Region: Cusco
- Capital: Anta

Government
  - Mayor: Wiliam Loaiza Ramos

Area
  - Total: 1,876.12 km^{2} (724.37 sq mi)

Population (2005 census)
  - Total: 57,905
  - Density: 30.864/km^{2} (79.938/sq mi)
- UBIGEO: 0803
- Website: www.anta.cus.mp.gob.pe

Anta is one of thirteen provinces in the Cusco Region in the southern highlands of Peru.

== Geography ==
The Willkapampa mountain range traverses the province. The highest peak of the province is Sallqantay at 6,271 metres (20,574 ft). Other mountains are listed below:

- Amparay
- Anawillka Q'asa
- Aqu Q'asa
- Aya Samachina
- Hatun Q'asa
- Hatun Urqu
- Imillay
- Llama Wasi
- Minasniyuq
- Muyuq
- Pitu Phaqcha
- Puka Q'asa
- Qiwllawina
- Sinqa
- Sullu Qaqa
- Suray
- Tiklla
- Tukarway
- Uqhupampa
- Yana Qaqa
- Yanaqucha
- Yawar Quchayuq

== Political division ==
The province is divided into nine districts (Spanish: distritos, singular: distrito), each of which is headed by a mayor (alcalde). The districts, with their capitals in parentheses, are:

- Ancahuasi (Ancahuasi)
- Anta (Anta)
- Cachimayo (Cachimayo)
- Chinchaypujio (Chinchaypujio)
- Huarocondo (Huarocondo)
- Limatambo (Limatambo)
- Mollepata (Mollepata)
- Pucyura (Pucyura)
- Zurite (Zurite)

== Ethnic groups ==
The people in the province are mainly indigenous citizens of Quechua descent. Quechua is the language which the majority of the population (70.28%) learnt to speak in childhood, 29.35% of the residents started speaking in Spanish.

== See also ==
- Chukchu
- Kachimayu
- Killarumiyuq
- Quriwayrachina
- Tampukancha
- Tarawasi
- Wat'a

== Sources ==
The pampa de Anta, a plateau, contains some of best communal cultivated lands in the provinces of Anta and Cusco. It is located at around 3000 meters above sea level, and is used to cultivate mainly high altitude crops such as potatoes, tarwi (edible lupin), barley and quinoa.
