= Moyoc =

Mountain in Peru

- Location within Peru

Highest point
- Elevation: 5,175 m (16,978 ft)
- Coordinates: 13°21′18″S 72°21′41″W

Naming
- Language of name: Quechua

Geography
- Location: Peru, Cusco Region
- Parent range: Andes, Vilcabamba

Moyoc (possibly from Quechua for spiral, winding) is a 5,175-metre-high (16,978 ft) mountain in the Vilcabamba mountain range in the Andes of Peru. It is located in the Cusco Region, Anta Province, on the border of the districts of Huarocondo and Limatambo, and in the Urubamba Province, Ollantaytambo District. Moyoc lies southeast of Ocobamba and Mount Huayanay.
