= Huarocondo District =

Coordinates: 13.4145°S 72.2076°W

Huarocondo
- District
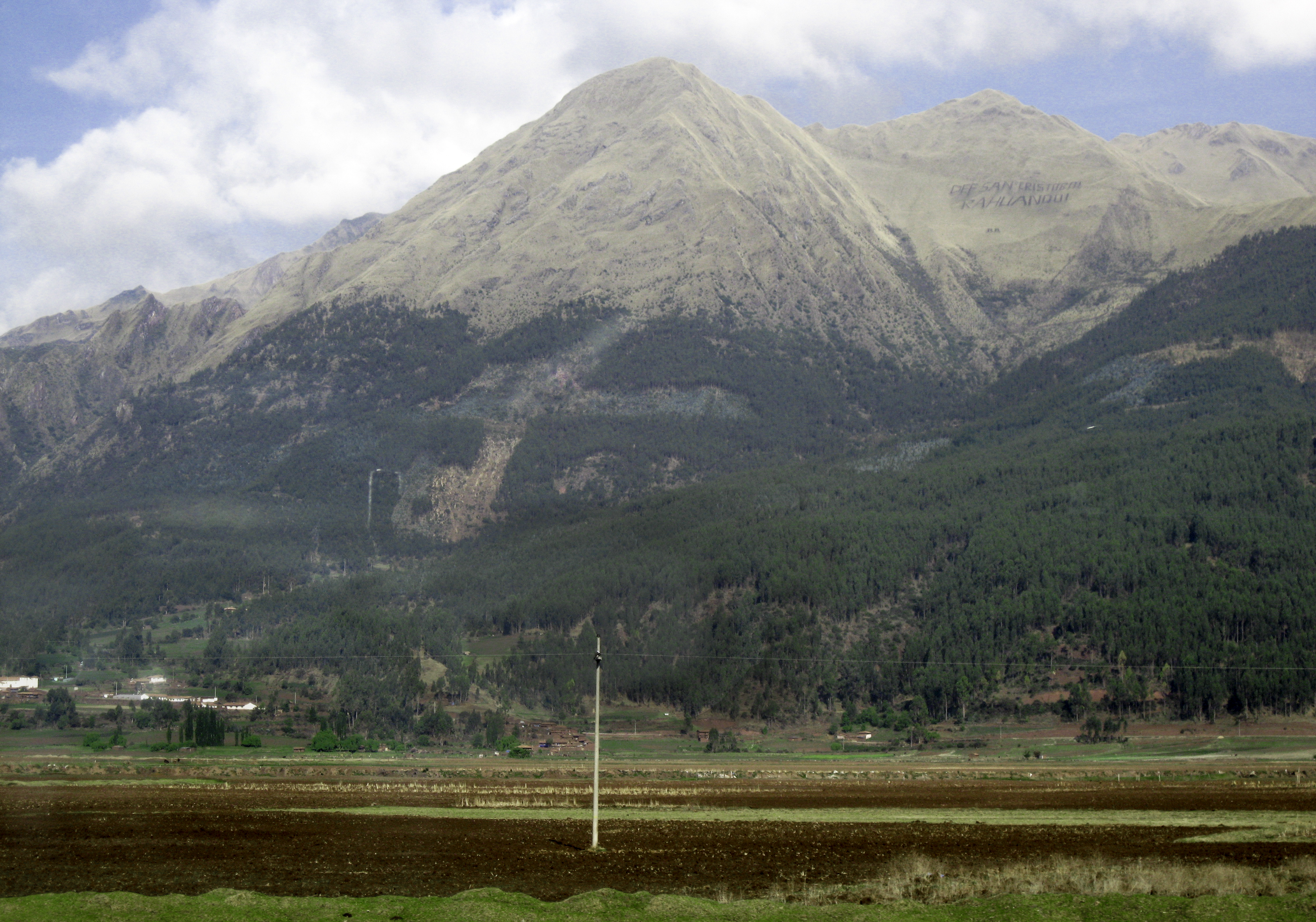
- Rawanki
- Interactive map of Huarocondo
- Country: Peru
- Region: Cusco
- Province: Anta
- Founded: November 14, 1896
- Capital: Huarocondo

Government
  - Mayor: Simon Ccorimanya Ccahua

Area
  - Total: 228.62 km^{2} (88.27 sq mi)
- Elevation: 3,331 m (10,928 ft)

Population (2005 census)
  - Total: 5,617
  - Density: 24.57/km^{2} (63.63/sq mi)
- Time zone: UTC-5 (PET)
- UBIGEO: 080305

Huarocondo District is one of nine districts of the province Anta in Peru.

== Ethnic groups ==
The people in the district are mainly indigenous citizens of Quechua descent. Quechua is the language which the majority of the population (80.81%) learnt to speak in childhood, 18.93% of the residents started speaking using the Spanish language (2007 Peru Census).

== See also ==
- Muyuq
- Wat'a
