= Tarahuasi =

Archaeological site in Peru

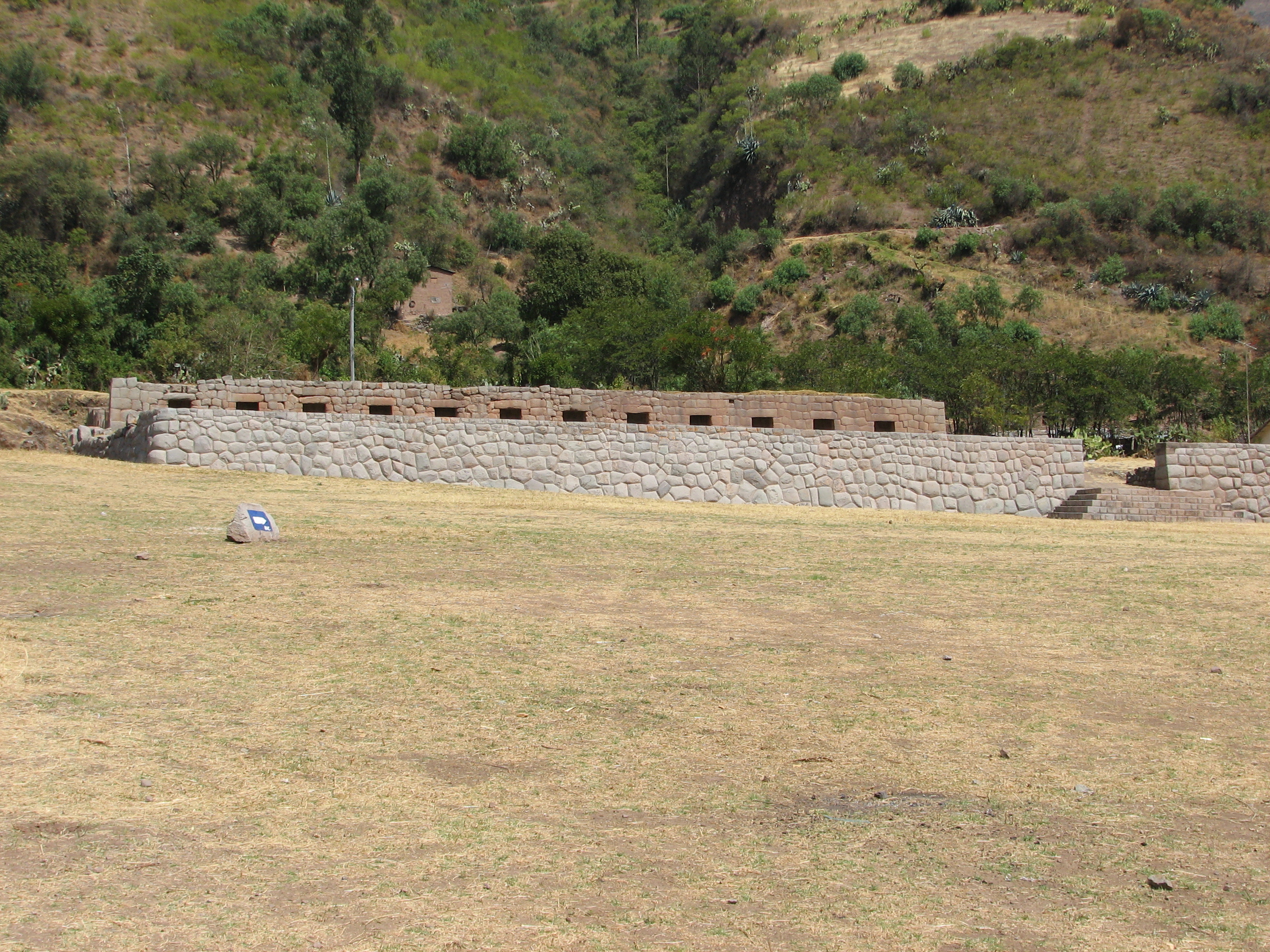
- View of Tarahuasi

- Location within Peru
- 13°28′09″S 72°26′11″W
- Location: Limatambo District, Anta Province, Cusco Region, Peru
- Region: PE

Tarahuasi (possibly from Quechua tara (Caesalpinia spinosa), a small tree native to Peru, wasi house) is an archaeological site in Peru. It is located in the Cusco Region, Anta Province, Limatambo District.

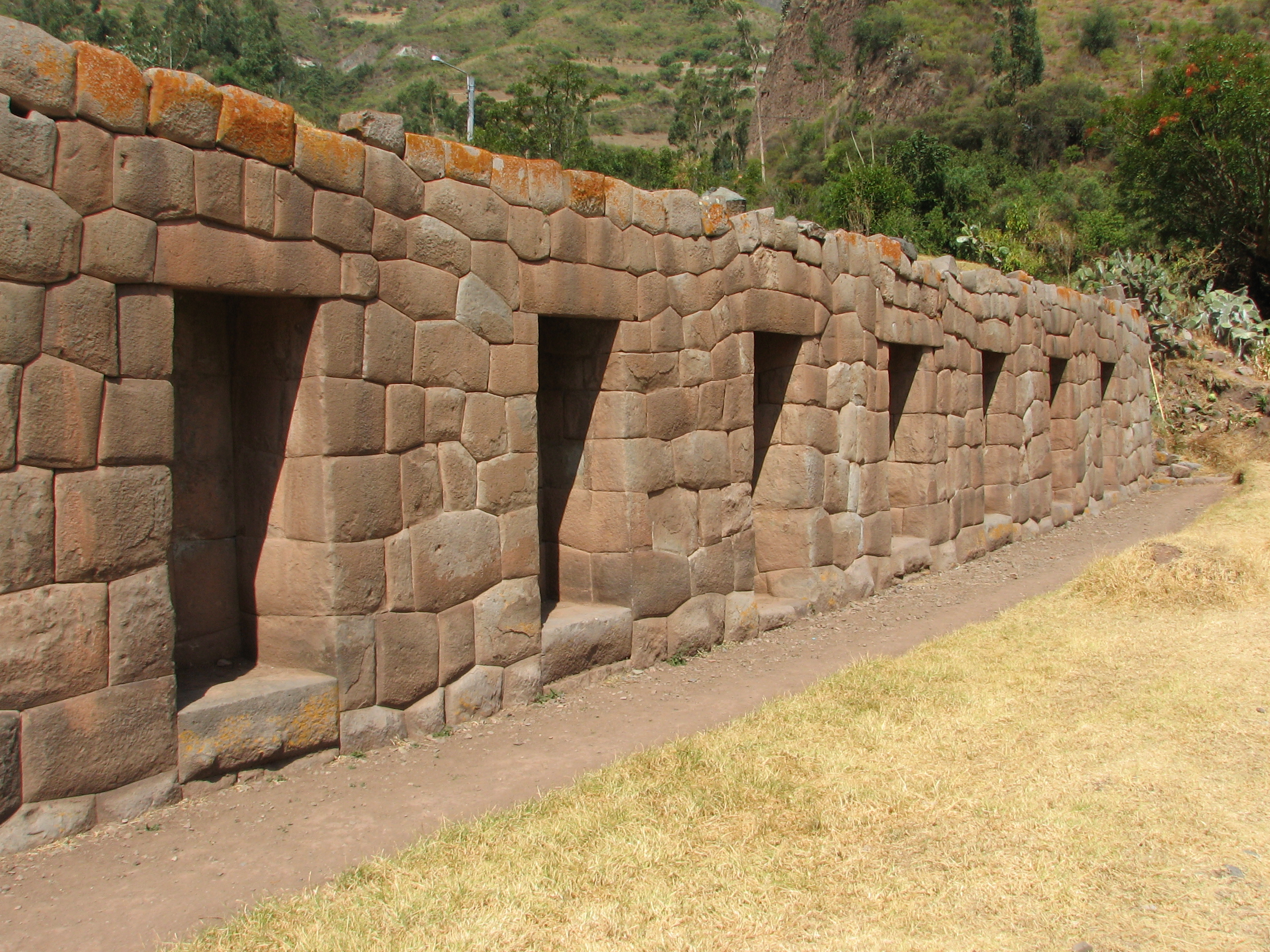
Closer view of the wall

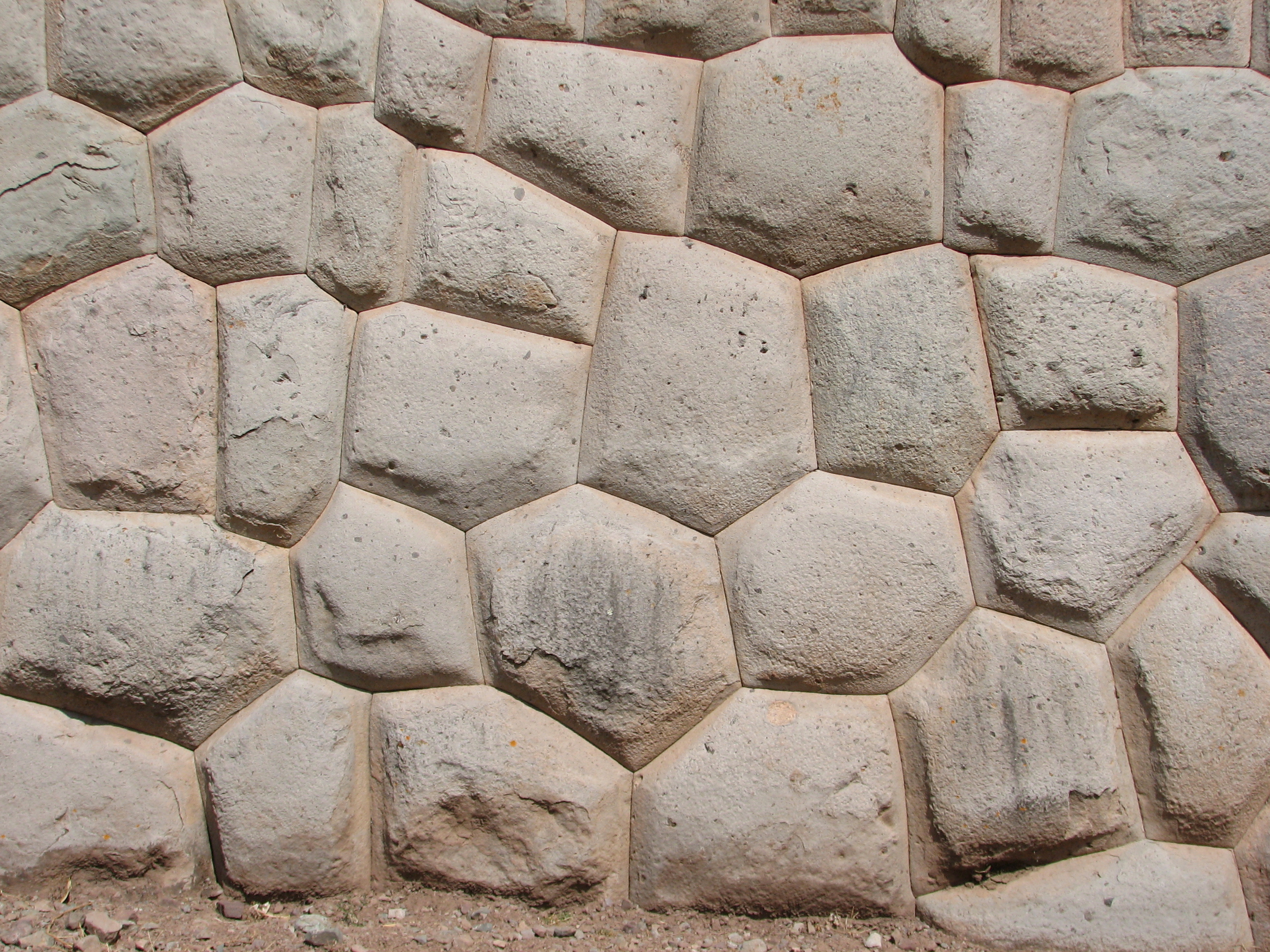
The stones used for the wall
