= Tampukancha =

Archaeological site in Peru

- Interactive map of Tampukancha
- Cultures: Inca
- Location: Peru
- Region: Cusco Region, Anta Province

Tampukancha (Quechua, tampu inn, kancha enclosure, enclosed place, yard, a frame, or wall that encloses, Hispanicized Tambocancha, also Tambokancha) is an ancient Incan religious center located in Peru. It is located in the Cusco Region, Anta Province, Zurite District, about 30 miles from Cusco, the historic capital of the Inca Empire.
