= Ocra =

Ocra or OCRA may refer to:

- Ocra (Peru), a farming community near Cusco
- Ovarian Cancer Research Alliance, a not-for-profit organization
- Nanos (plateau), formerly Ocra, an area of Slovenia
- OCR-A, a typeface

== See also ==
- Okra, a vegetable
