= Manifesto of three-day corvee =

1797 legal document

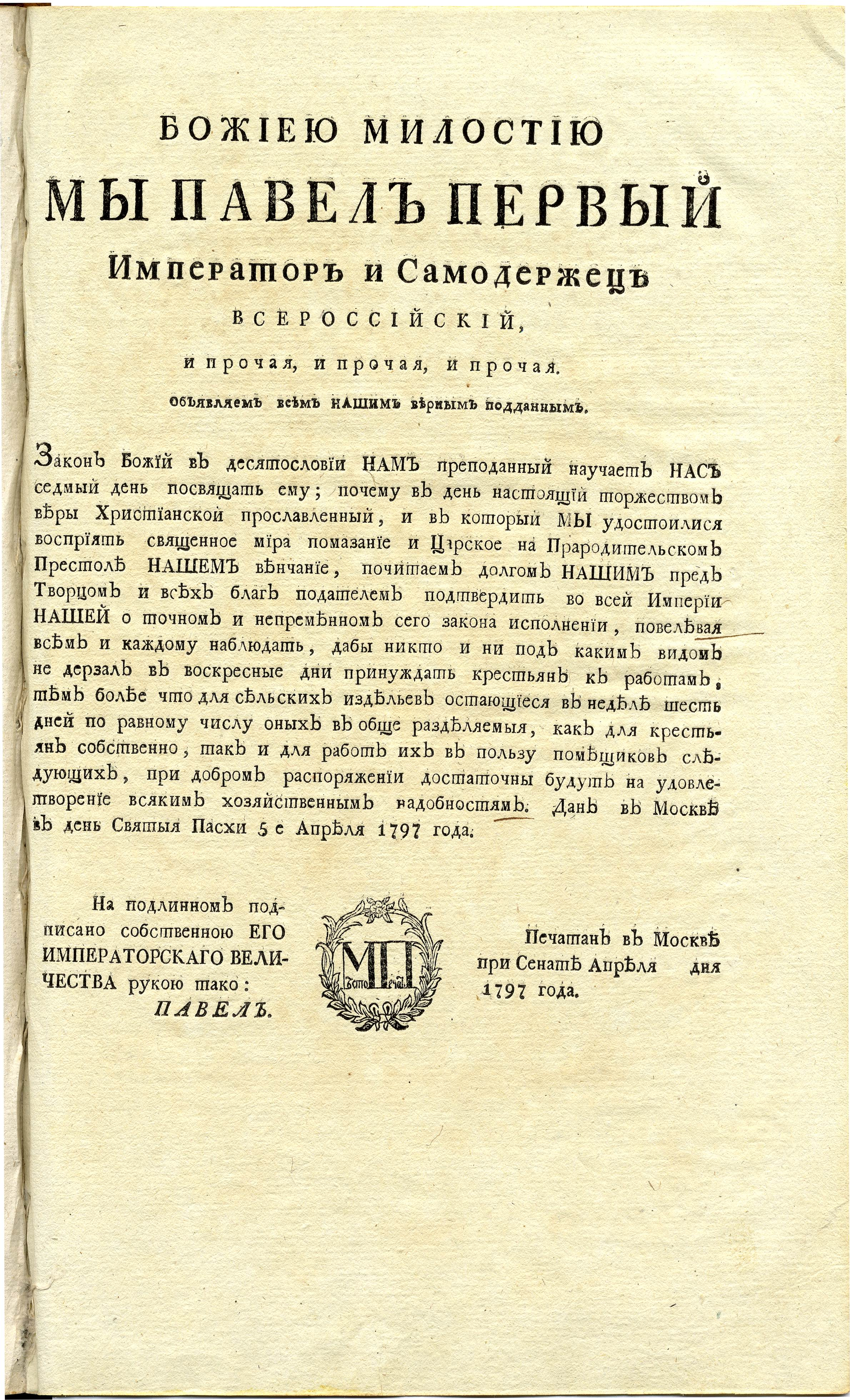
The manifesto of three-day corvee.

The Manifesto of three-day corvee or An Imperial Edict Forbidding Sunday Labor by Serfs (Russian: Манифест о трёхдневной барщине от 5 апреля 1797 года, romanized: Manifest o trokhdnevnoy barshchine ot 5 aprelya 1797 goda) was issued by the Russian emperor Paul I on April 16, 1797, as a first ever legal attempt at extending the rights of Russian serfs. The document prohibited use of corvée labour on Sundays by landowners, the State and the Court, prescribing that the rest of the week should be divided in half between the landowners' requests and peasants' own needs, theoretically restricting landowners' command over labour use to just three days in a week.
