= Minka (communal work) =

Incan tradition of community work

Coordinates: 36.4000°N 136.8833°E

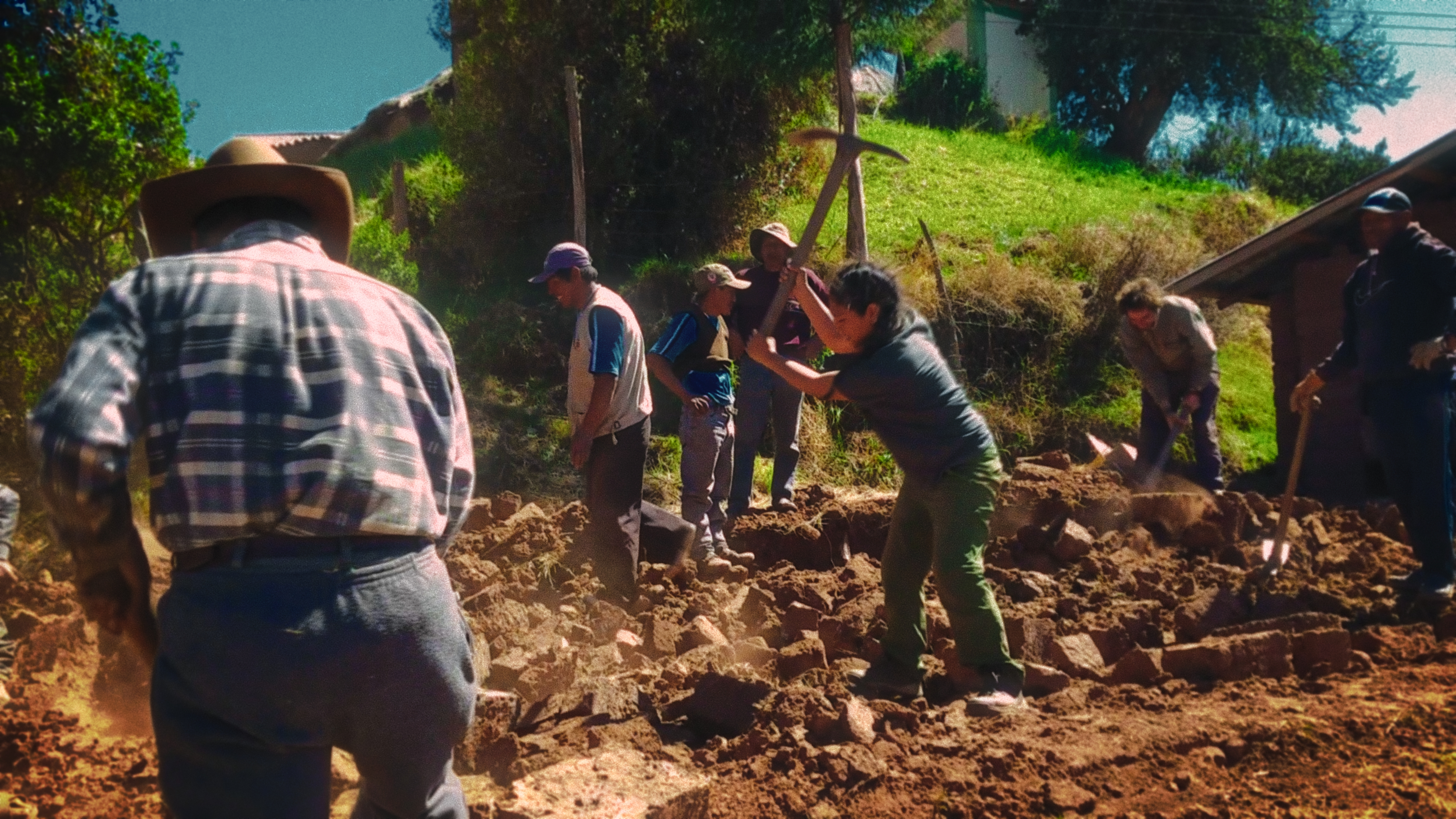
A modern Mink'a in the campesino community of Ocra, Peru, during which a community kitchen is constructed out of adobe.

Mink'a, Minka, Minga (from Quechua minccacuni, meaning "asking for help by promising something") also mingaco is an Inca tradition of community work/voluntary collective labor for purposes of social utility and community infrastructure projects. It is practiced in several Latin American countries. Mink'a can adopt different ways of expressing community, such as the construction of public buildings and infrastructure, or benefit a person or family, such as needing help when harvesting potatoes or other agricultural products. Usually, the mink'a labor is without salary, such as in the public works projects of Ocra, a campesino community in the Andes. Faenas are seen as a labor tribute to the community or a cash-free form of local taxation. Mink'a or Minga is mainly practiced in Colombia, Peru, Ecuador, Bolivia, Chile, and Paraguay.

== Peru ==
In Peru, the concept of mink'a is associated with pre-Columbian indigenous cultures. It is practiced in mestizo and campesino communities of the Andes, where the notion of reciprocity (ayni) organizes community work. An example of this type of reciprocity is the development of agricultural activities among a dozen neighbors in traditional productive units, or the building of a community kitchen with personal tools and local materials. During the Inca Empire, mink'a was the basic way in which work was carried out within communities (ayllu) and was also practiced for the benefit of larger territories (mit'a), as part of the services that each ayllu provided to the whole of the society. The families participated in the construction of premises, irrigation canals, as well as helped in the farm operations of the disabled, and cared for orphans and the elderly. Due to the great migration to the cities of the Peruvian coast, mink'a became widespread in the coastal areas of Peru - mostly however within smaller communities where local "taxation" consisting of labor is more feasible than a monetary tax to realize community projects.

== See also ==
- Mit'a, federal mandatory labor during the Inca empire
- Ocra (Peru), a community practicing Mink'a to this day
- Communal work
- Umuganda (Rwanda), a national day of community service
