= Ocra (Peru) =

- Ayllu (Andean Quechua community)
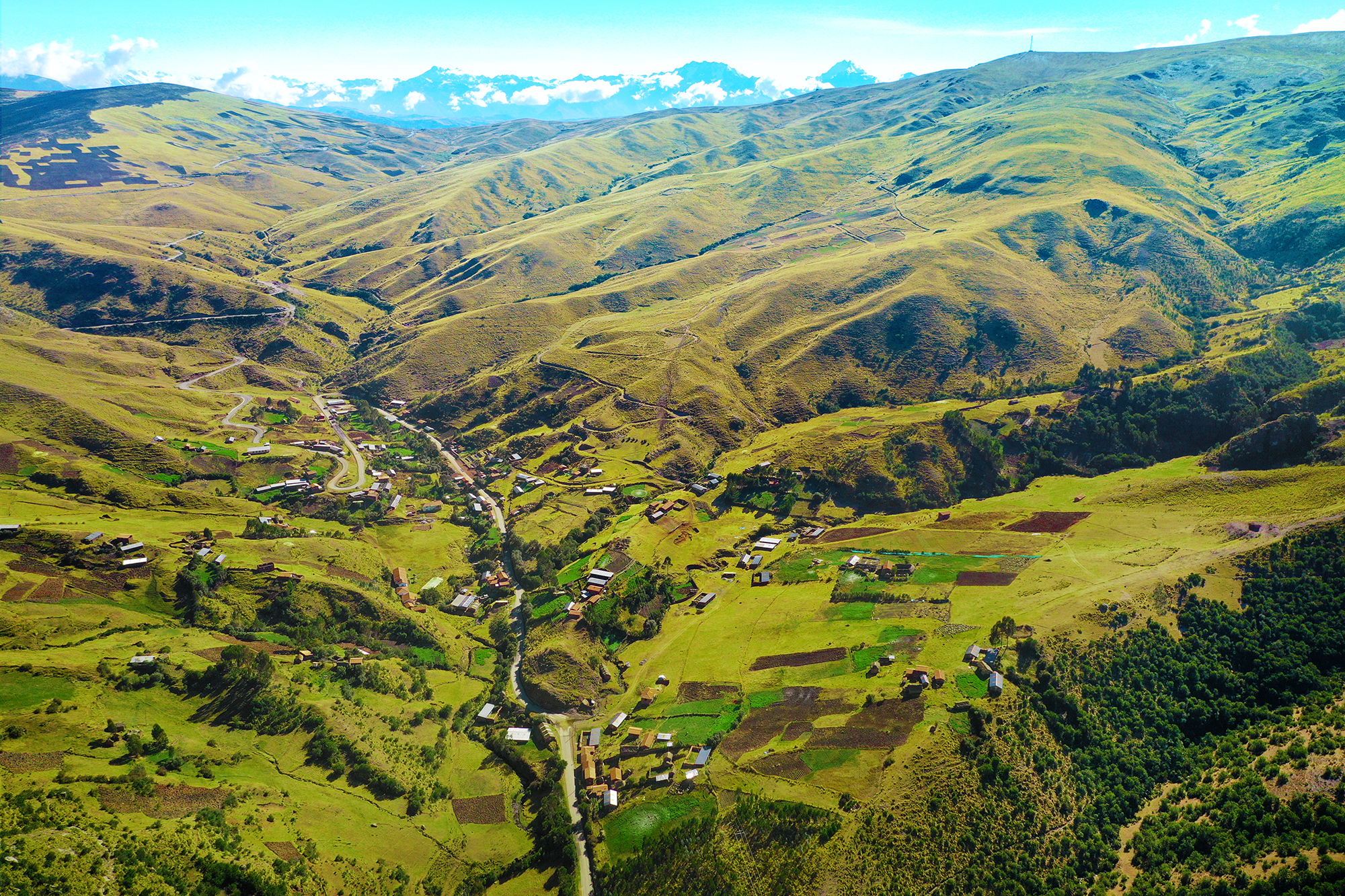
- The village of Ocra as seen from the air

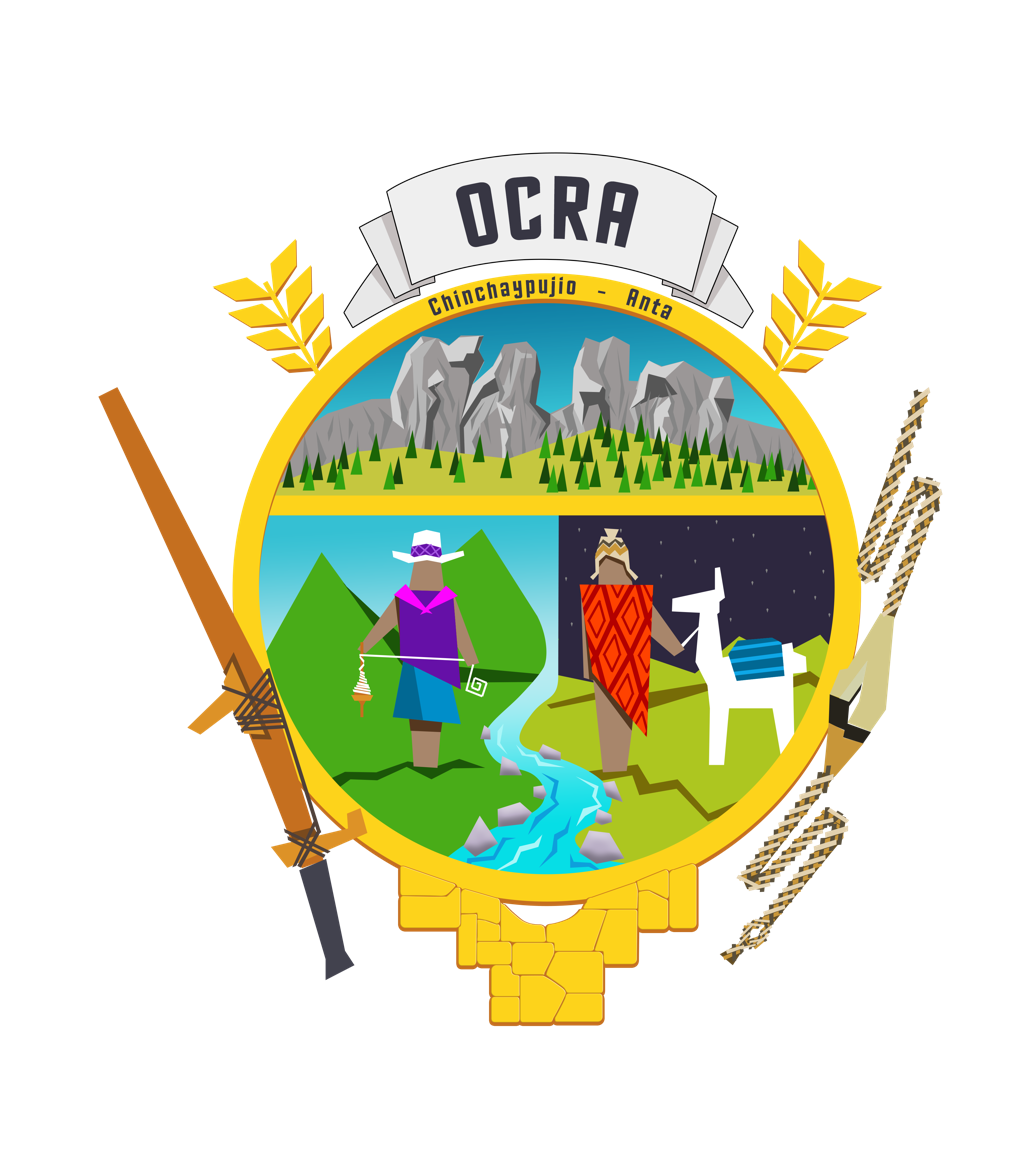
- Flag Coat of arms

- Location within Peru
- Coordinates: 13°34′29.6″S 72°12′17.4″W
- Country: Peru
- Region: Cusco
- Province: Anta
- District: Chinchaypujio District
- Founded: September 7, 1973

Government
  - Mallku (President): Jorge Cruz
- Elevation: 3,670 m (12,040 ft)

Population
  - Total: 90
- Time zone: UTC-5 (PET)
- Website: www.facebook.com/OcraPeru

Ocra (from Quechua "ayllu Uqra Katunki", named after the plant okra and the hacienda "Katunki" that used to be where Ocra is today) is a Quechuan Campesino community within the Chinchaypujio District in Peru and about 1.5 hours outside of Cusco; its central village is located at 3,670 m (12,040 ft) altitude.

== History ==
Half of the area of Ocra used to be one big hacienda named "Katunki", the other half used to be the grounds that people who worked at the hacienda lived on. Its entire community were peasant campesinos who worked for the hacienda – mostly to pay rent for their grounds in the other half of the community – and lived in abject poverty, many of them in a state of debt bondage.

In the late 1960s, Peru went through a tumultuous political period and the government was overthrown in a coup d'état . Military dictator General Juan Velasco Alvarado rose to power in 1969 and enacted a number of socialist reforms to Peru in the following years, including a large land reform that redistributed 9,000,000 hectares (22,000,000 acres) from wealthy land owners to the poor peasantry of Peru, with partial compensation for the former owners by the federal government of Peru. As part of this Peruvian land reform, the hacienda of Ocra was broken up into a communal parcel and given to the community of local farmers, who in turn became land owners as a collective.

In order to legally support the land redistribution and independence from the hacienda owner, Ocra was incorporated as a community within the Chinchaypujio District in 1973; the land ownership was then transferred to that incorporated communal body. Subsequently, the people of Ocra agreed on a somewhat informal distribution of the communal land between individual families, and land has been traded, rented and transferred internally between community members to the present day.

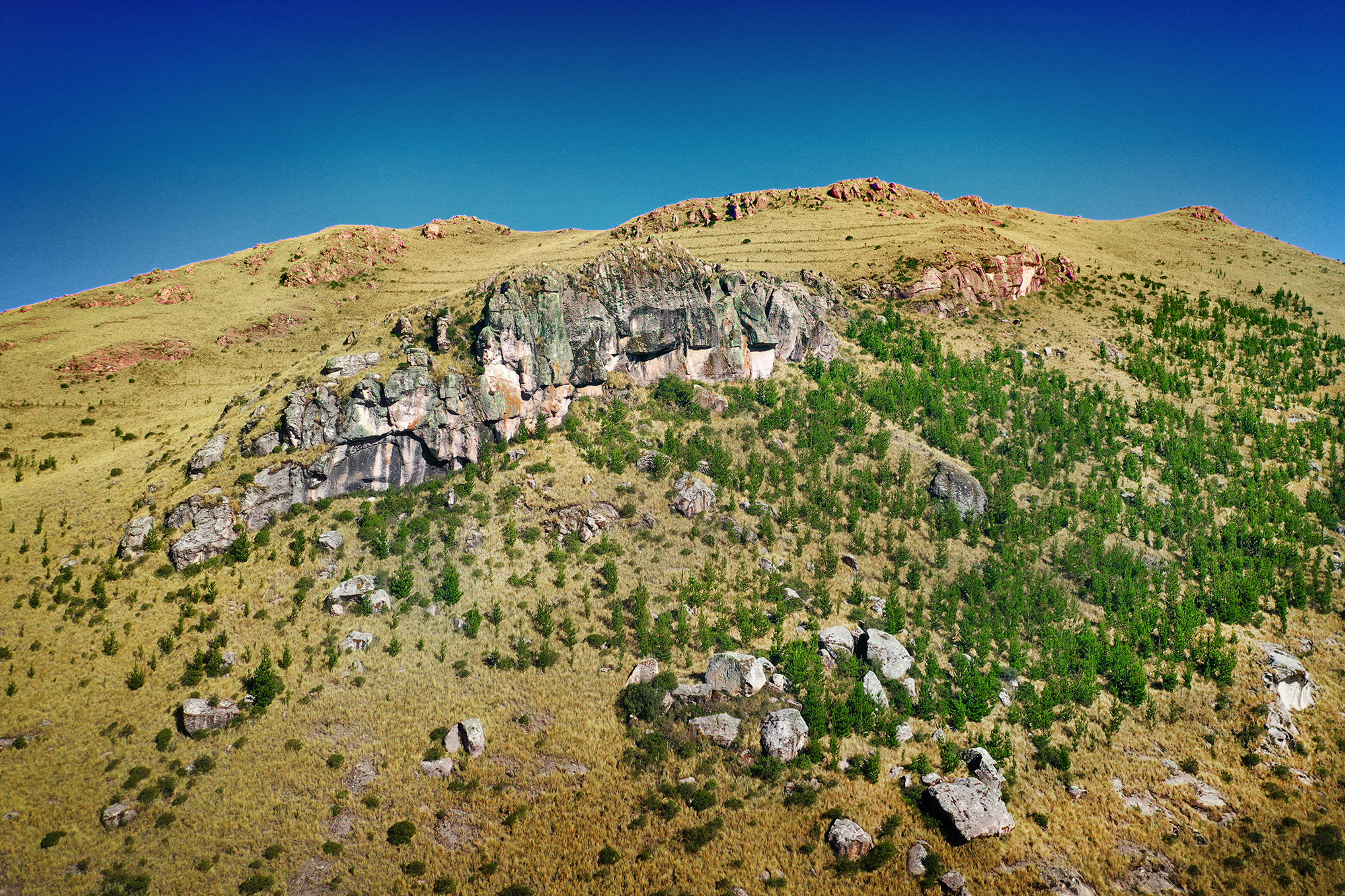
Pine tree plantation in Ocra—part of a reforestation initiative

== Geography ==
Ocra is situated in a valley, surrounded by rolling hills and stand-alone rock formations. During Velasco's reign, the region was planted with forests of eucalyptus trees to spur economic development. A recent change is that no more eucalyptus are allowed to be planted in Ocra due to their high water consumption and invasive nature. The village is actively trying to bring back more native and/or water-conserving plants such as pine trees, and the Anta Provincial government has supported this development by sponsoring a large pine tree plantation on Ocra's western hills. A tributary stream of the Apurímac River runs through the center of Ocra. The hills surrounding Ocra are covered in Peruvian feather grass (Jarava ichu), which is used both as feed for livestock during herding, as well as the base material for thatched roofs, which are mostly applied on storage buildings.

The rugged, hilly terrain makes the use of mechanised agriculture impossible, so fields are traditionally ploughed by human labor alone, or with the assistance of horses.

== Agriculture ==
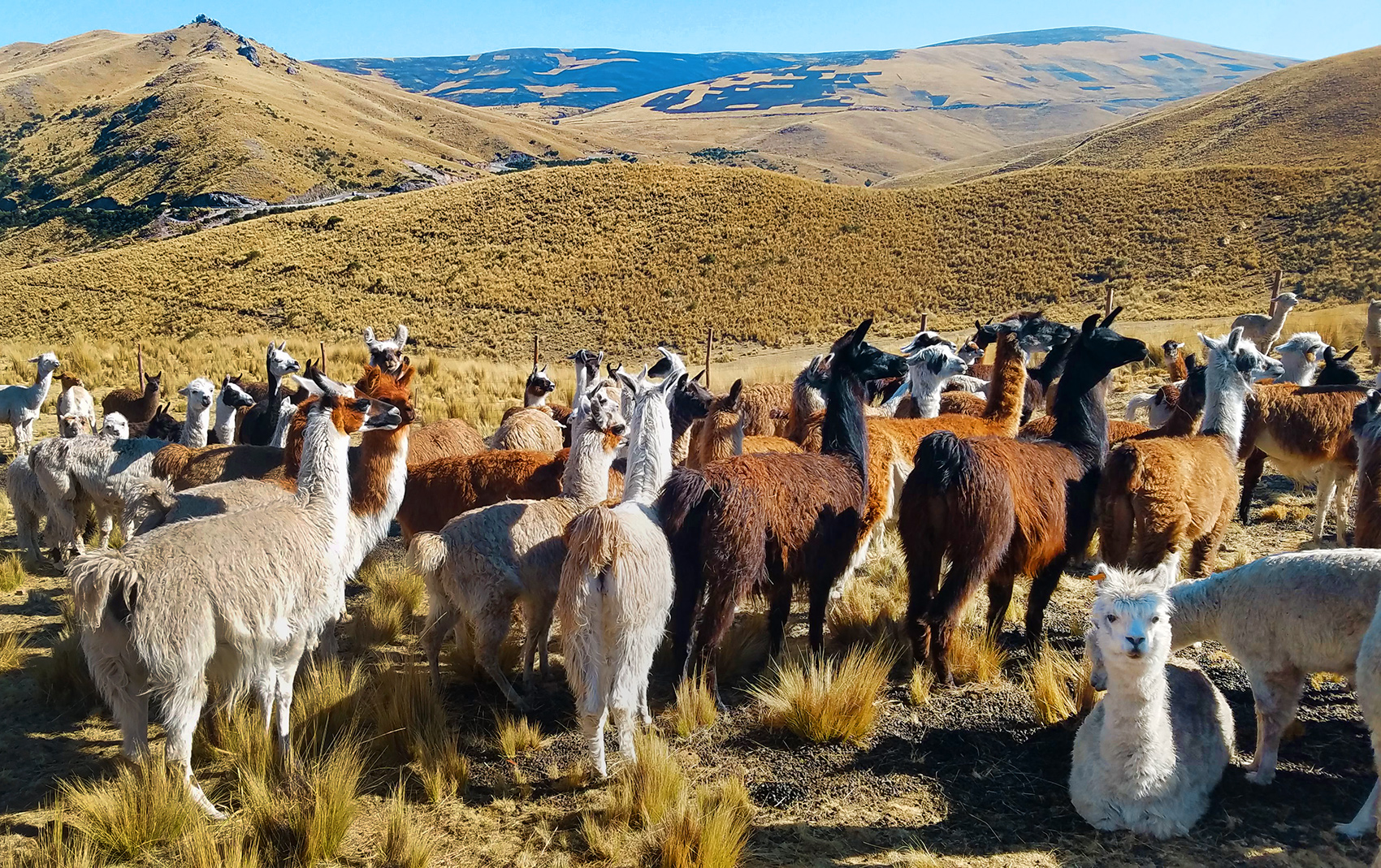
Llamas and alpacas in Ocra, waiting to be led to their grazing grounds.

Ocra is a village inhabited by subsistence farmers; agrarian activities and herding account for a majority of the local economy. Regionally native llamas and alpacas, as well as imported sheep, cattle, chickens and horses, are raised and herded in Ocra. Grazing grounds are often more than an hour away from the farm or herding corral; most local shepherds need to do two round trips per day to bring the animals to and from the grazing grounds. A specialty of Ocra are the Andes-native cuys (Guinea pigs) that are bred as livestock and cooked as a delicacy.

Crops are grown in a variety of small, sloped fields. Most crops grown in Ocra are tubers, such as potatoes, olluco, and maswa or añu; around 40 varieties are grown.

Ocra makes heavy use of locally produced chuños, freeze-dried potatoes that can be stored for years. Secondary crops consumed include quinoa, wheat, beans, tarwi, maize and barley, but not all of them can grow in Ocra's climate. The flour generated from some of the crop is used in a traditional sweetened breakfast drink, similar to oatmeal, which is sometimes mixed with coffee. A popular locally produced drink is chicha, a sweet corn beer.

== Culture ==
Ocra's efforts in preserving ancestral knowledge are central to its culture. In a competition between 14 countries in Latin America with 300 nominations, a project from Ocra won the CRESPIAL award for "Protecting [its] Intangible Cultural Heritage" in 2014 for the Culture and Indigenous Rights of the District Municipality of Chinchaypujio.

Ocra is governed by a community council that holds weekly meetings with all inhabitants in attendance; most decisions are made directly democratic. The community also practices the system of faena (Spanish for "task", known as Mink'a in Quechua), a mandatory weekly community labor tribute that all adults in the town have to take part in. This communal labor initiative goes back to the Incan labor systems—Mink'a for local communities, and Mit'a for federal projects. The local laws of Ocra prescribe 4 days of faena per month, and the community council decides over when and where the collective labor force shall be deployed.

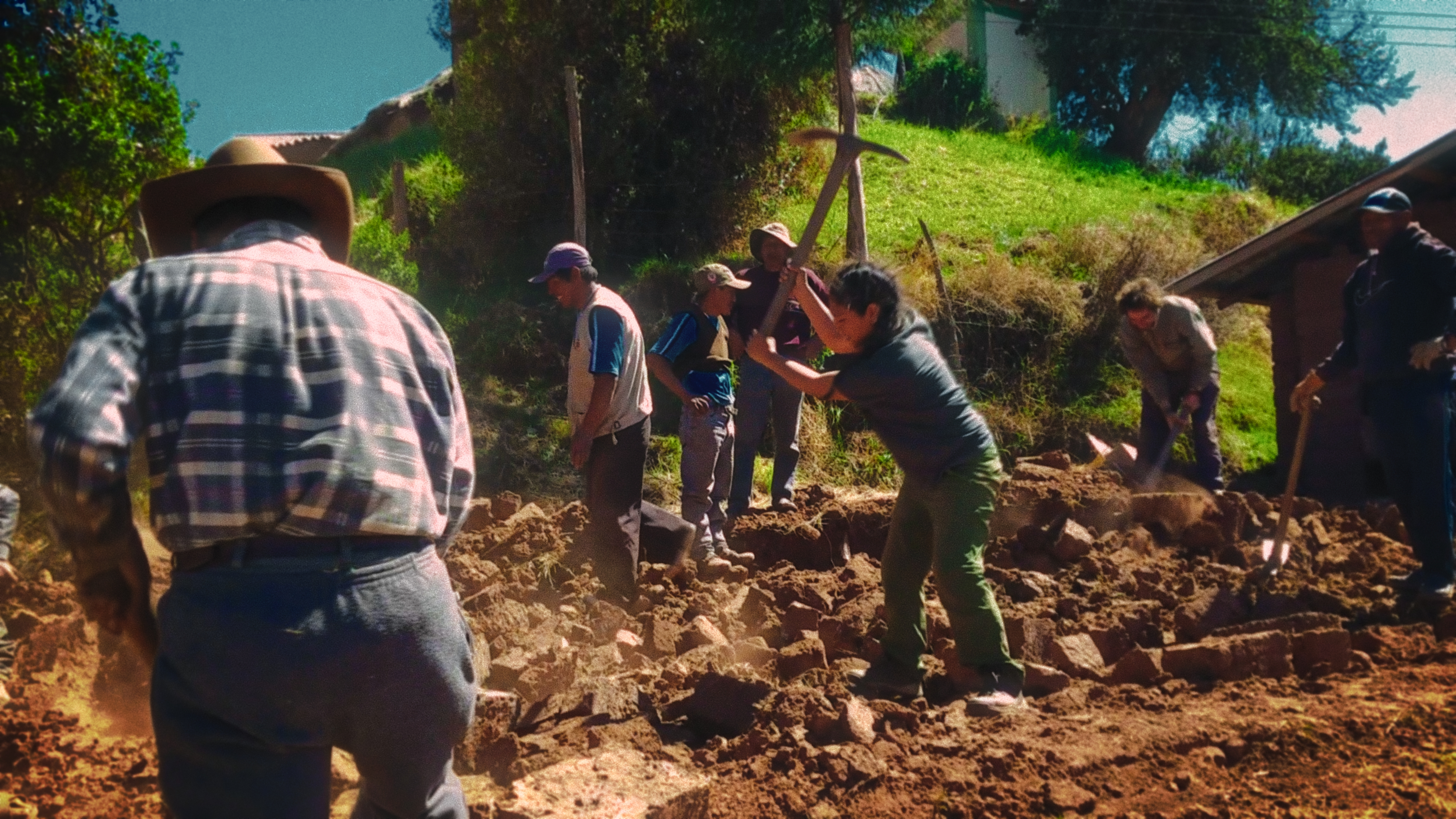
During a weekly faena (community labor tribute, a variety of Mink'a), Ocra locals and volunteers are dismantling an Adobe building and replacing it with a community kitchen.

The faena works similar to a local tax, but instead of contributing a portion of individual income to funding local infrastructure projects, the people of Ocra contribute 1/7th of their human labor to community undertakings. This design is beneficial for Ocra due to the occupational circumstance that most inhabitants of Ocra are subsistence farmers with limited cash flow. Since most contributions are in the form of labor, construction projects usually focus on adobe buildings and other structures that can be realized with locally available materials.

Most campesinos in Ocra wear a modern version of the Inca sandal Ushutas—the Ojota (Spanish: Yanquis), an extremely durable, black sandal made of recycled tire parts. Ojotas are used barefoot year-round, even in sub-zero temperatures, for working in herding, farming and construction; despite their cheap cost and heavy use on mountainous terrain, they usually last more than 2 years.

== Tourism ==
Ocra offers participatory farm stay experiences (tourismo vivencial) to tourists through the Quechua School and Quechua Trips initiatives, as well as authentic day trips like herding llamas with a local.

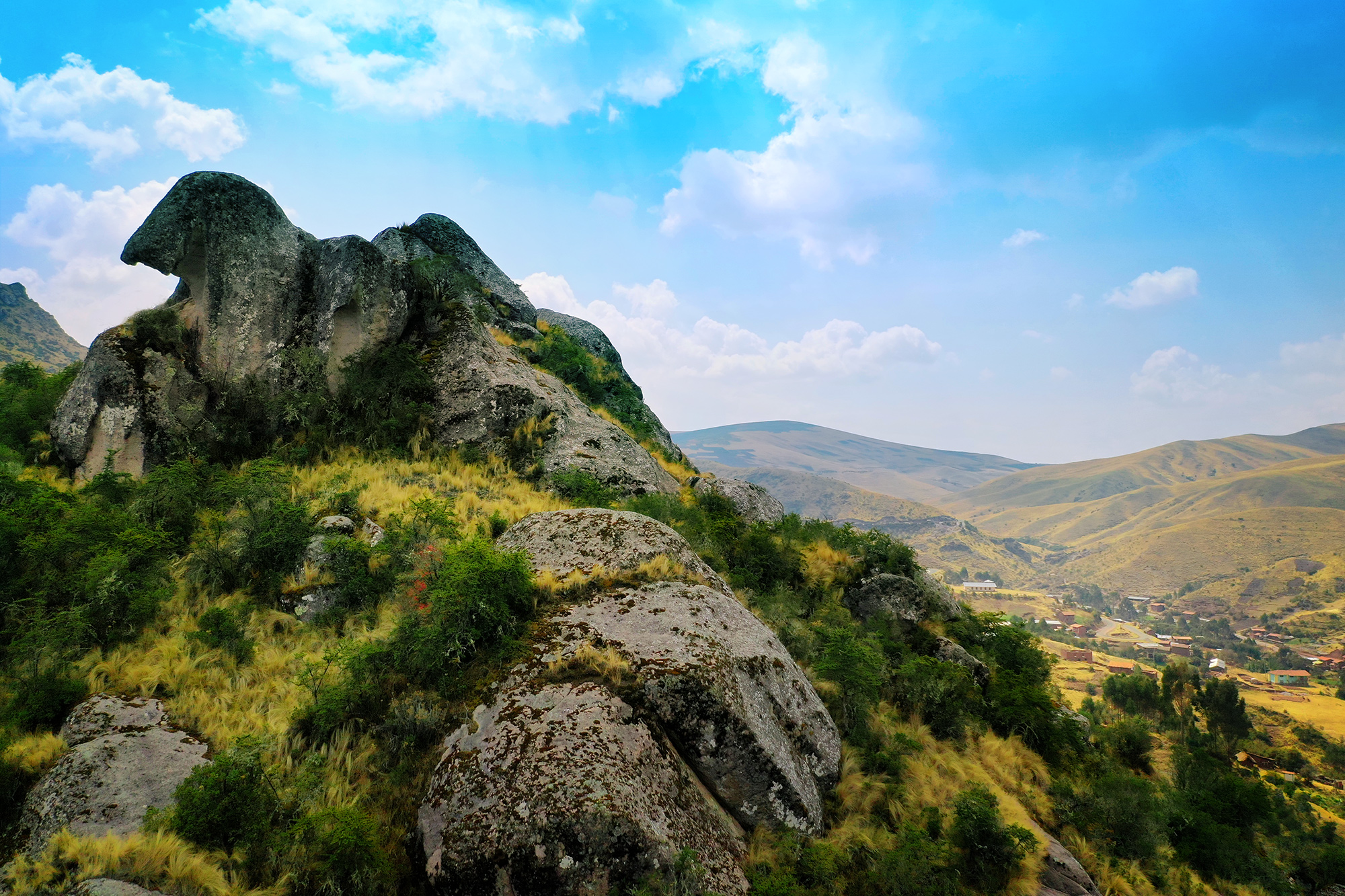
The "Cabeza de Condor" rock formation overlooking Ocra

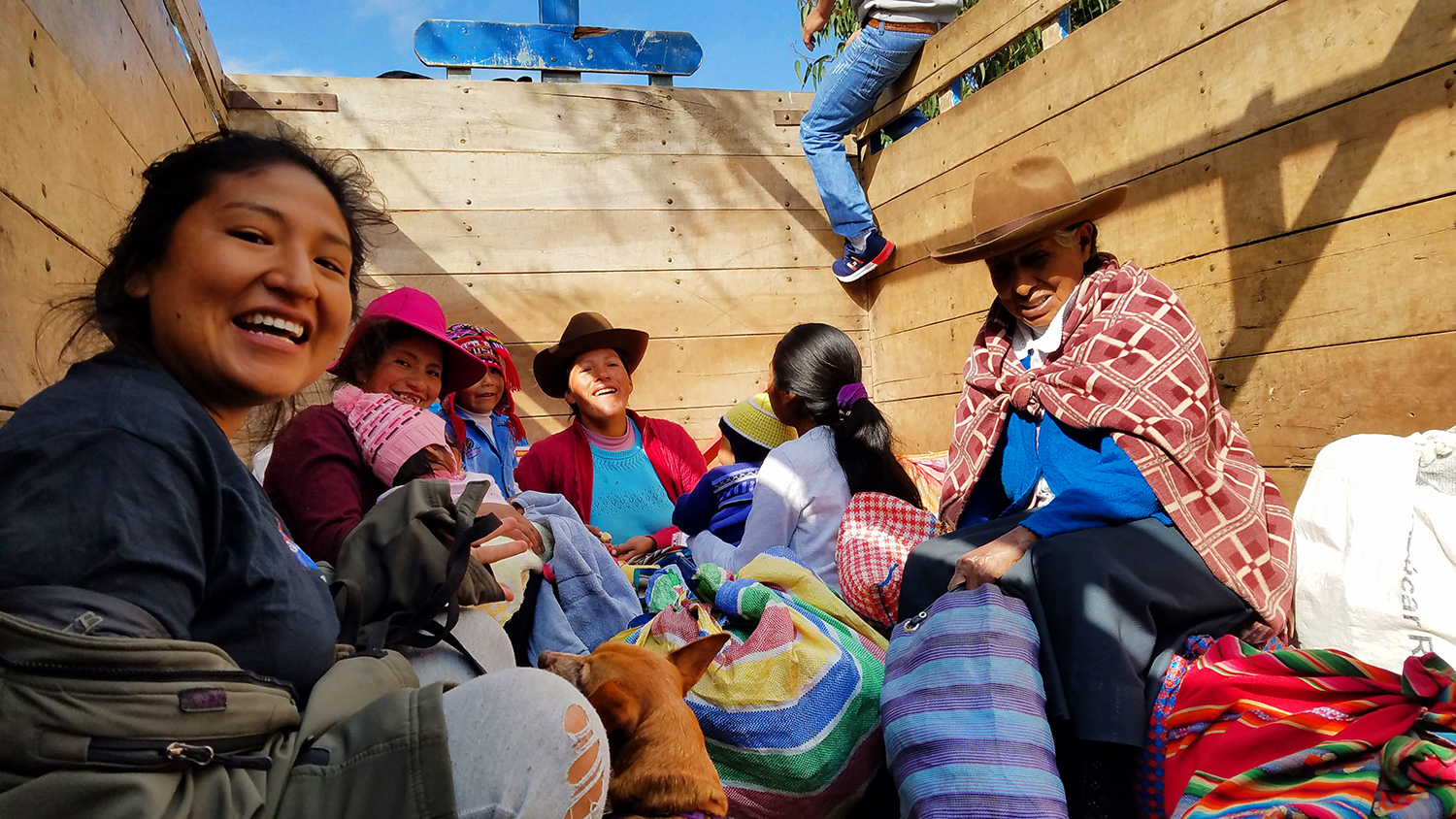
Locals and a volunteer transporting goods in a livestock truck to the Chinchaypujio market

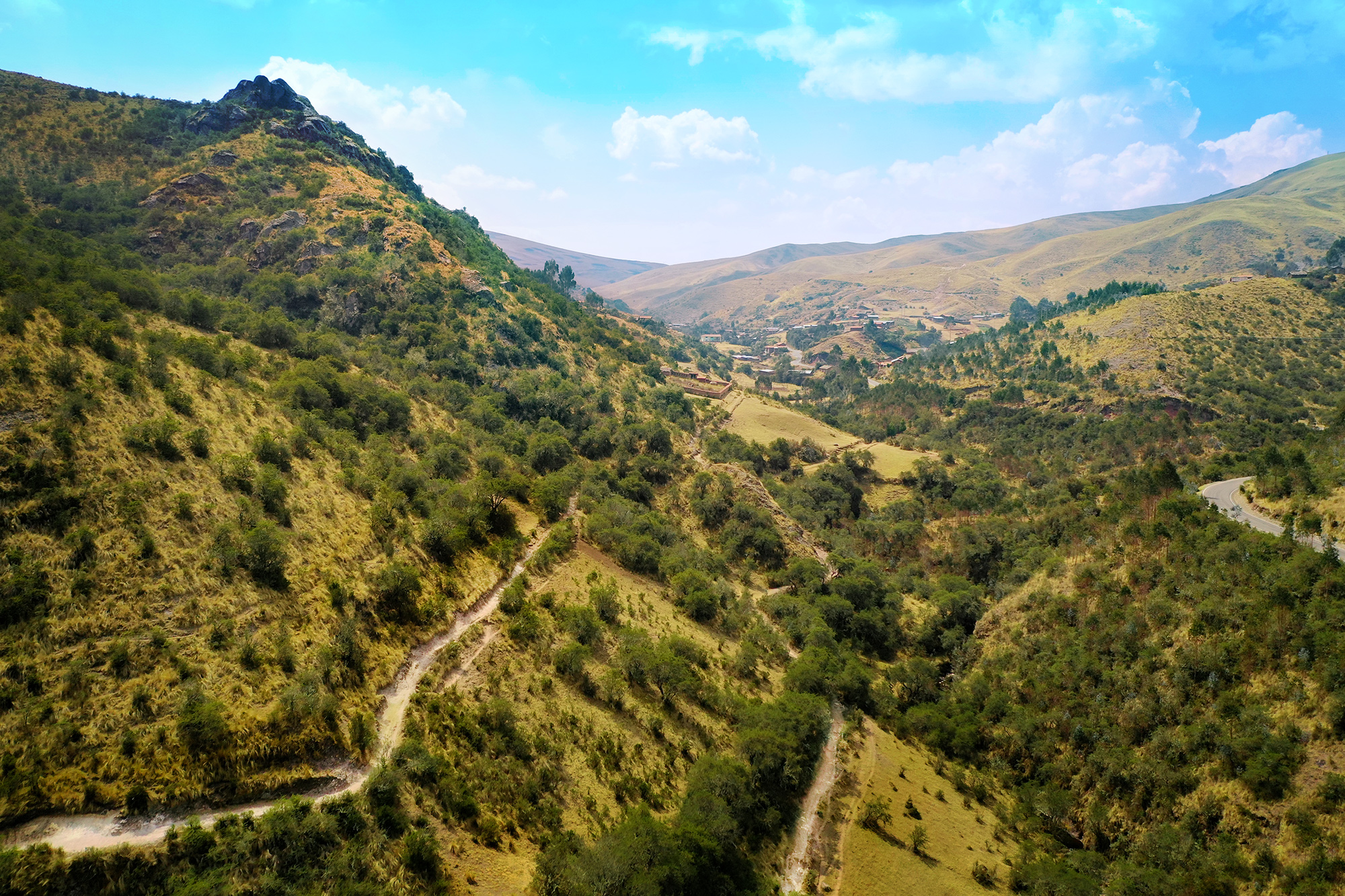
Hiking trails in Ocra

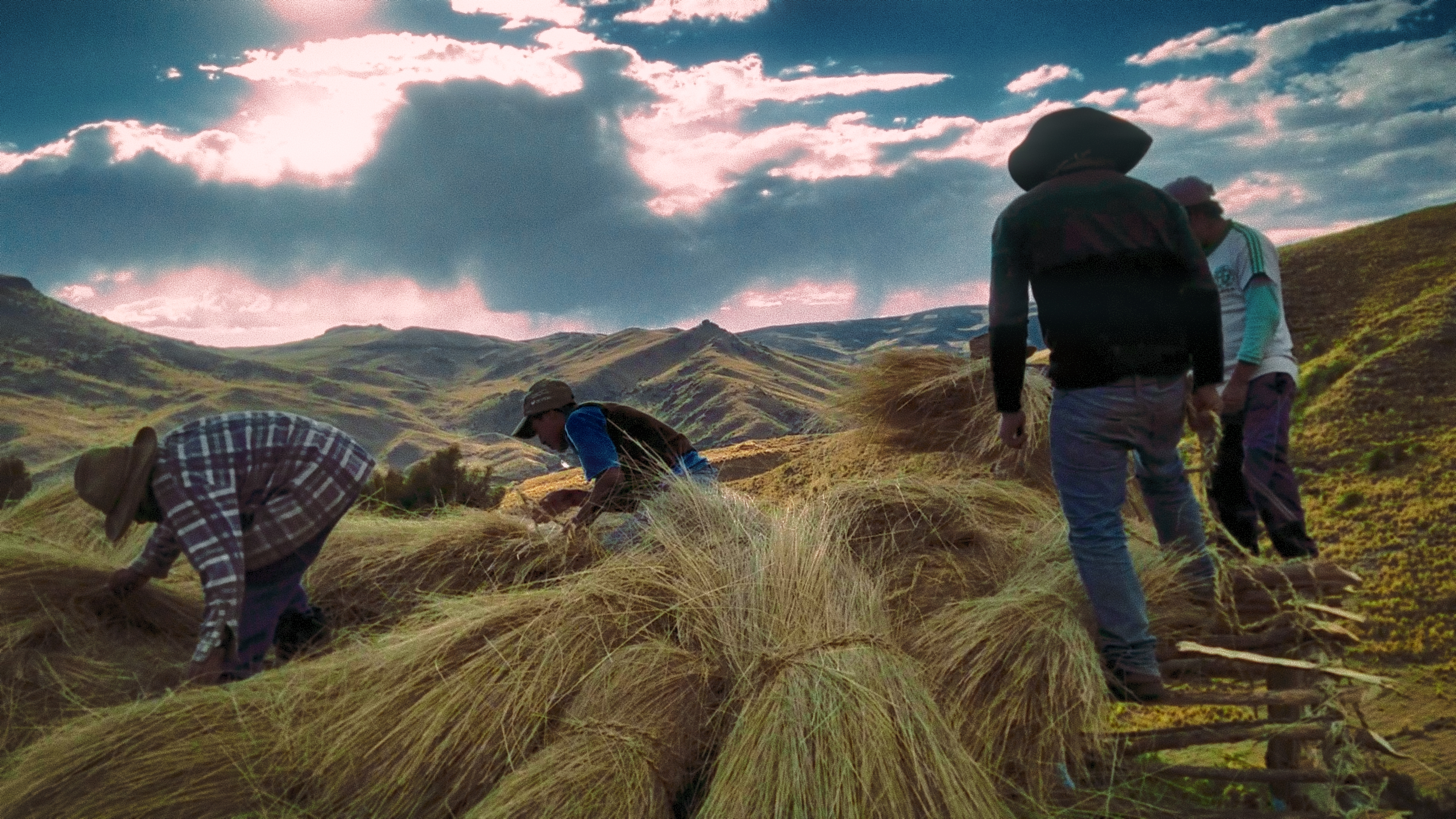
Building a thatched roof with local grass in Ocra during a faena

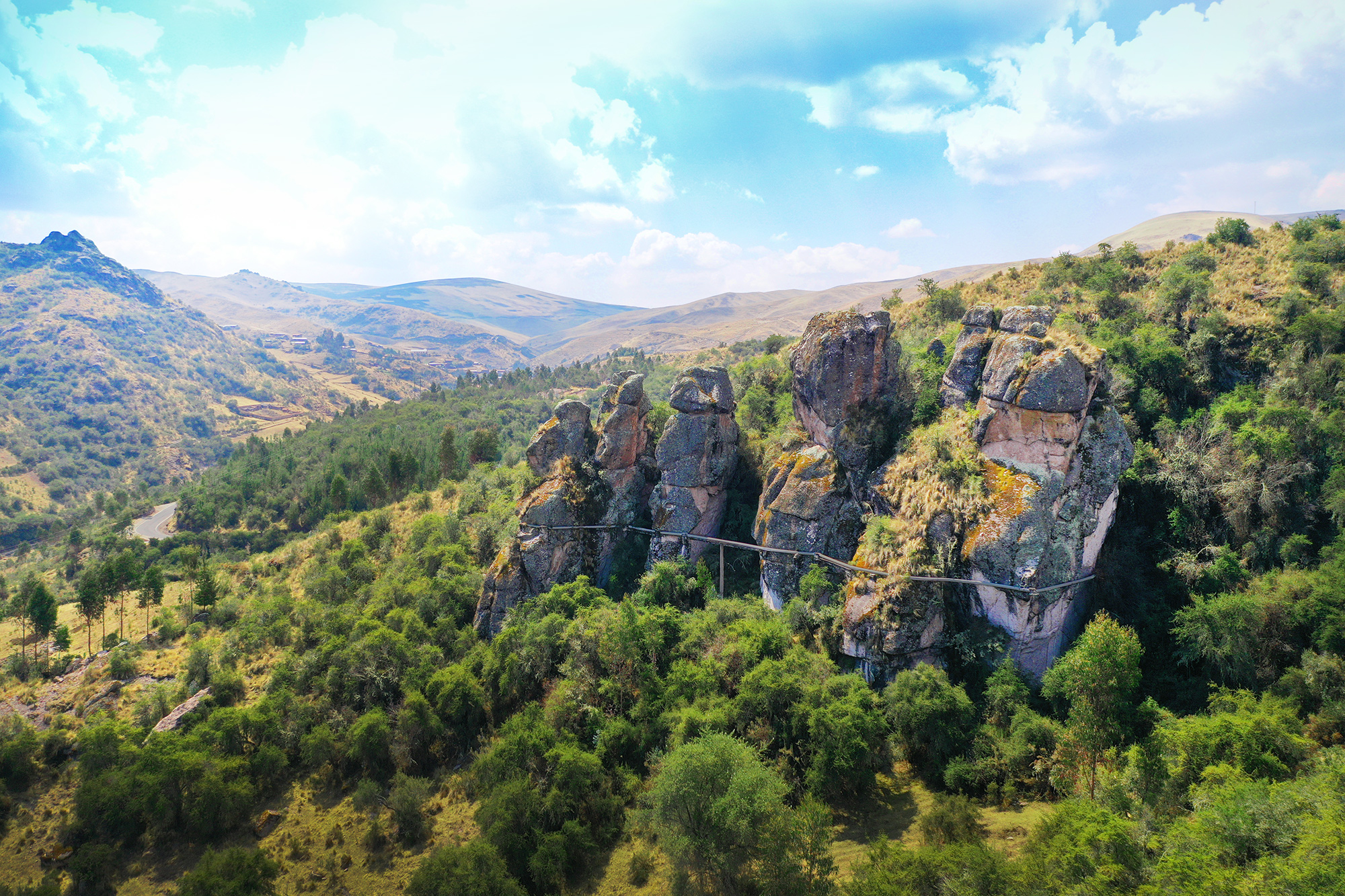
Rocas de Matrimonio formation in Ocra

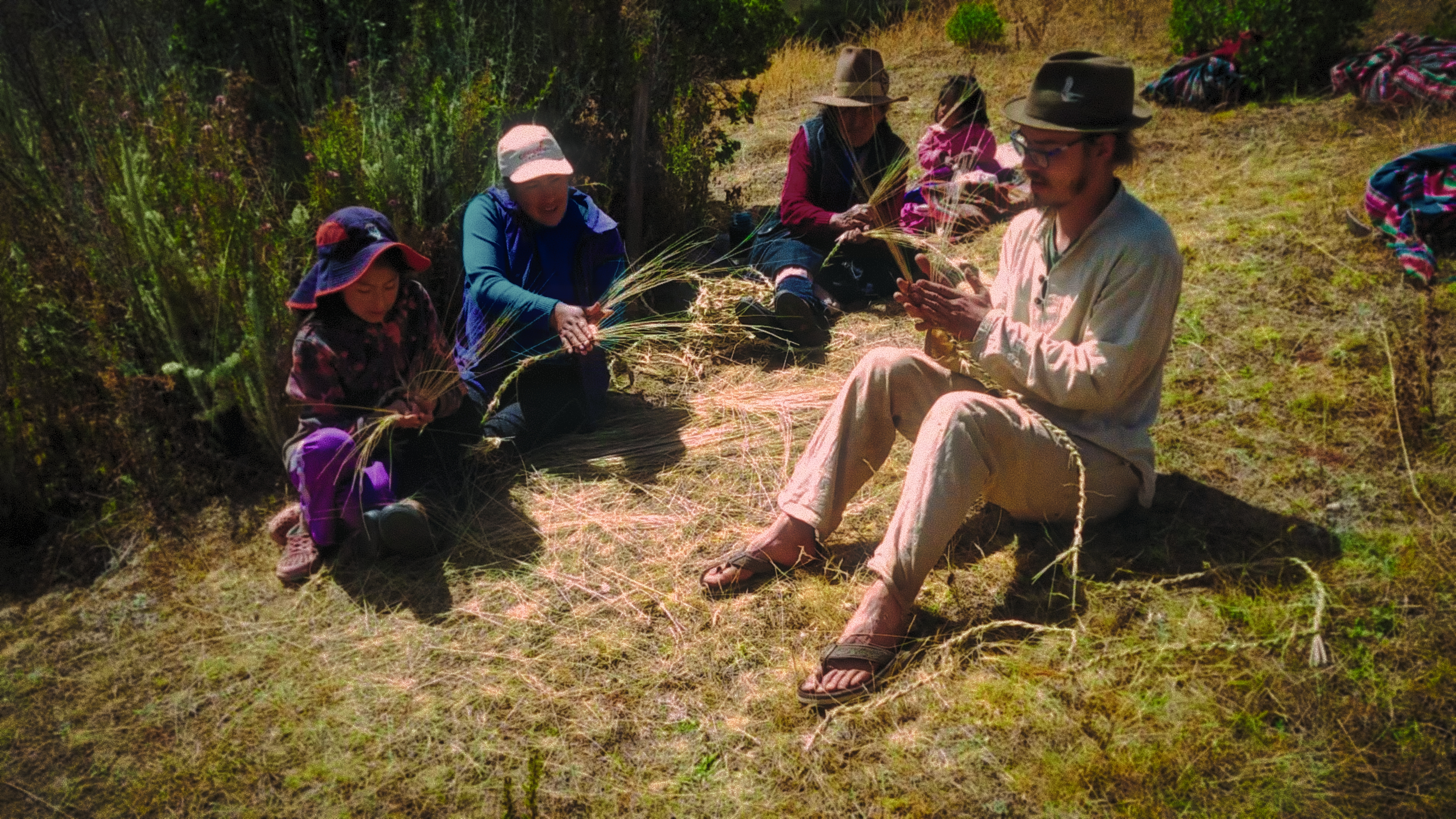
Volunteer learning how to build a hand-made rope out of grass

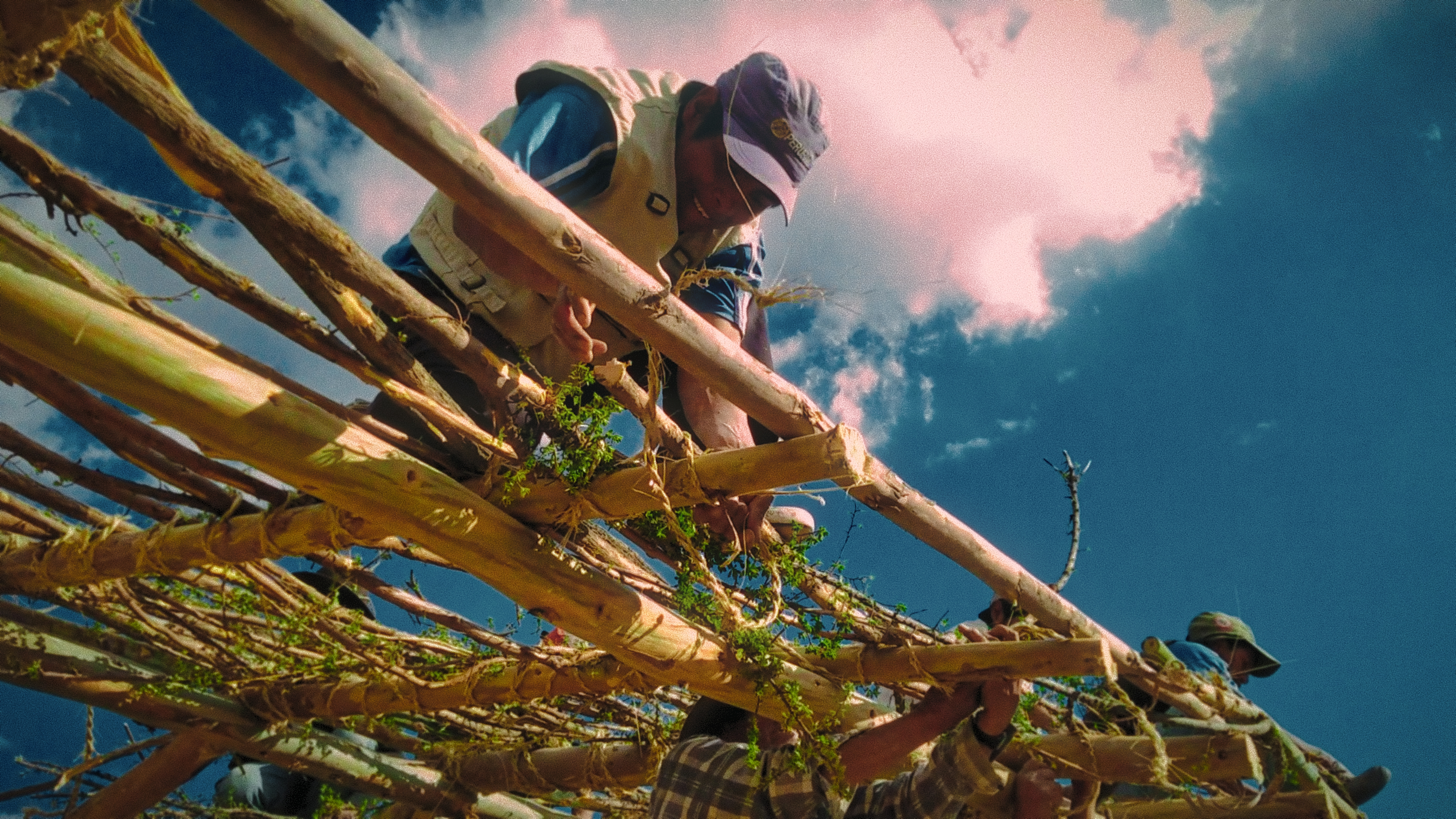
Building process of a grass roof in Chinchaypujio during a faena

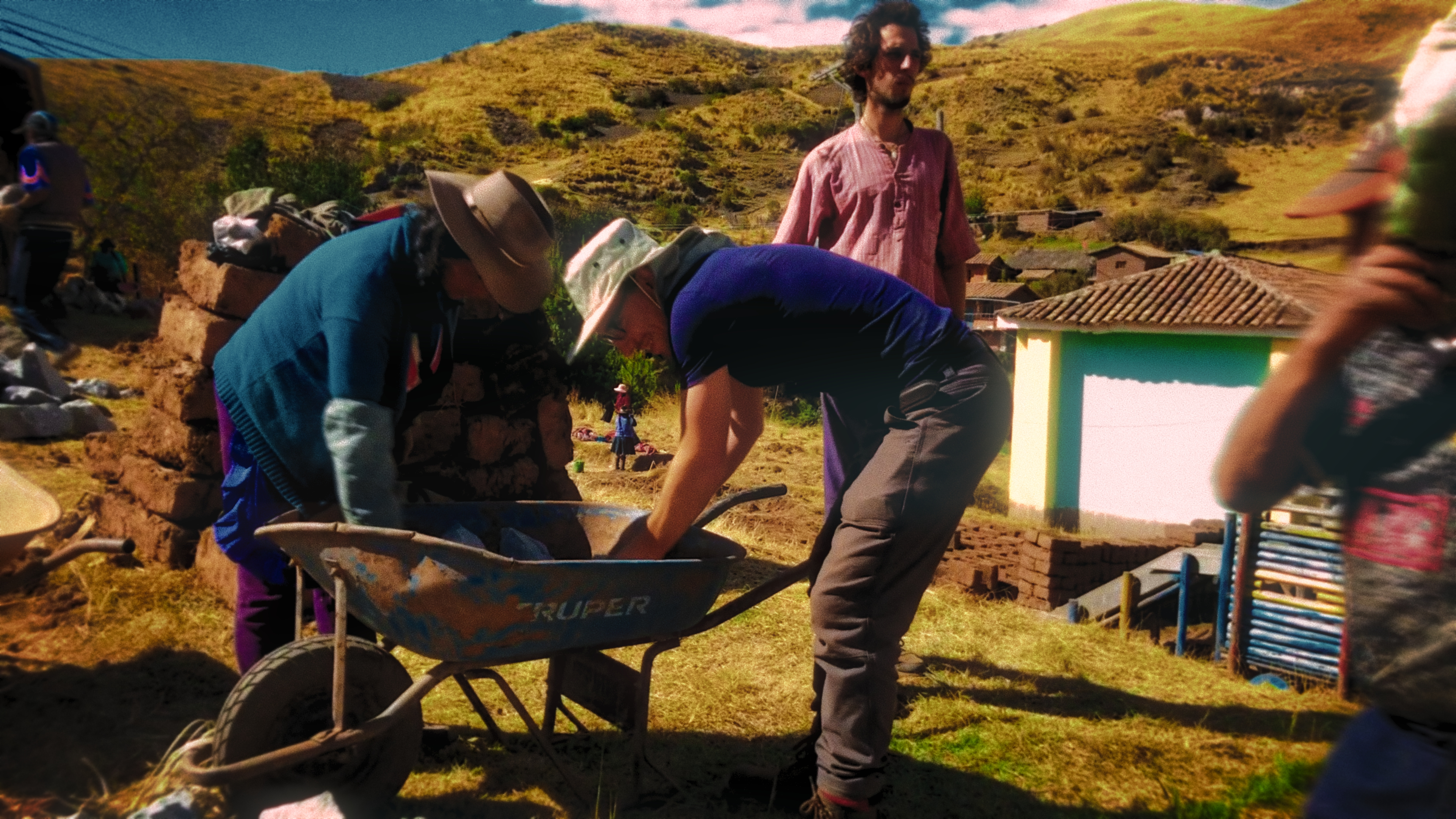
Communal kitchen building faena with volunteers in Ocra

== Climate ==
Ocra's winters (May–August) are mild and dry, its summers (November–February) are slightly warmer and much wetter with 162 mm (6.5 inches) of rain, as is usual for this region. While days can get hot, nights drop below freezing in the winter.

== Ethnic groups ==
The people in the district are mainly indigenous citizens of Quechua descent. Quechua is the language which the majority of the population (91.85%) learnt to speak in childhood, with 7.95% of the residents having Spanish as a first language instead (2007 Peru Census). As Quechua is mainly taught at home and only in some of the public schools of the district, younger generations grow up with an increasing amount of Spanish.

== See also ==
- Chinchaypujio District
- Quechua people
- Campesino
- Ayllu
- Mallku
