= Chinchaypujio District =

Chinchaypujio Chinchay Pukyu
- District
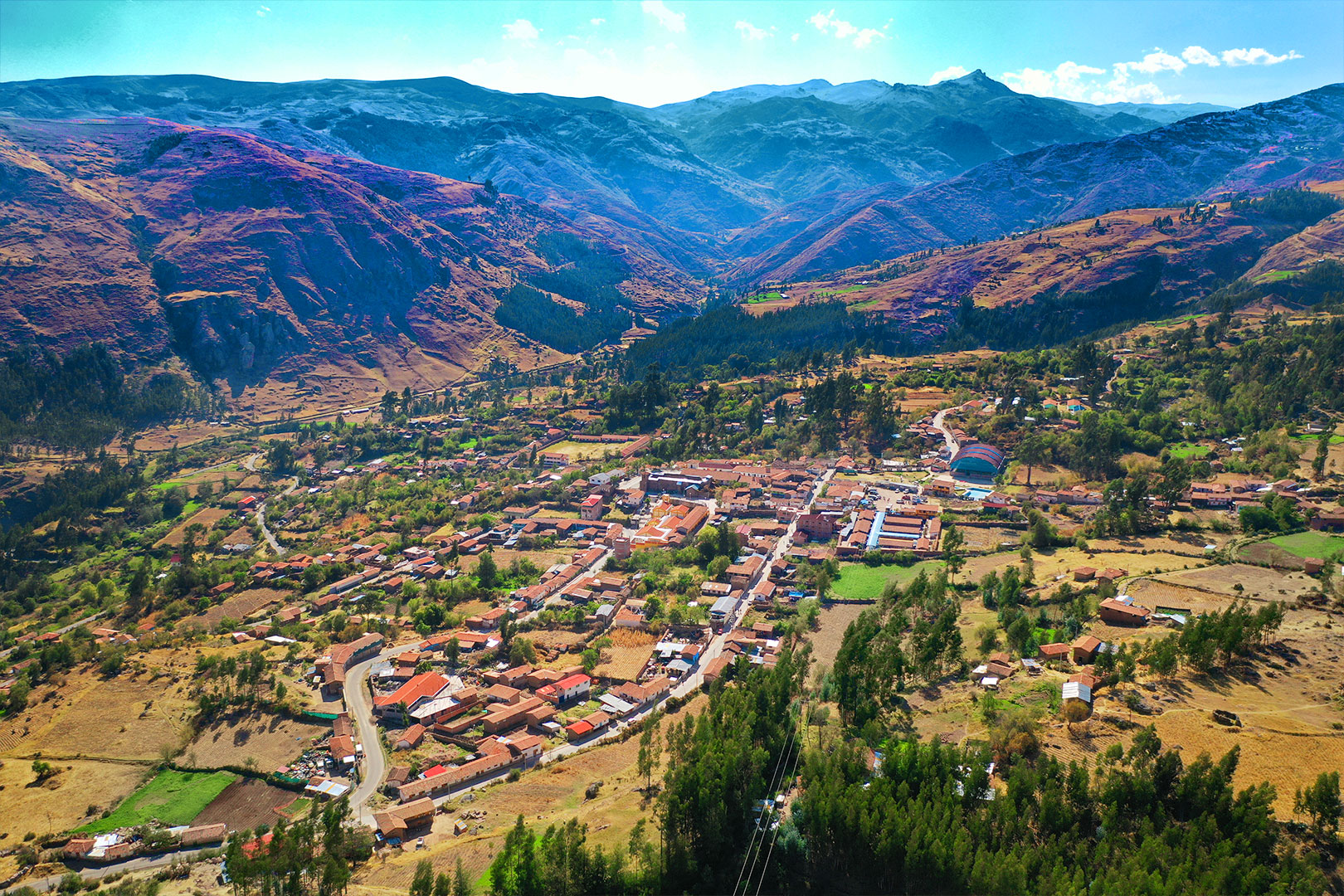

- Flag

- Location within Peru
- Coordinates: 13°37′48.2″S 72°13′58.6″W
- Country: Peru
- Region: Cusco
- Province: Anta
- Founded: October 1, 1941
- Capital: Chinchay Pukyu

Government
  - Mayor (Alcalde): Franklin Estrada Gallegos

Area
  - Total: 390.58 km^{2} (150.80 sq mi)
- Elevation: 3,105 m (10,187 ft)

Population (2005 census)
  - Total: 5,521
  - Density: 14.14/km^{2} (36.61/sq mi)
- Time zone: UTC-5 (PET)
- UBIGEO: 080304
- Website: https://www.facebook.com/Municipalidad-Distrital-de-Chinchaypujio-367758549965836/

Chinchaypujio (from Quechua Chinchay Pukyu, "Oncilla Spring"; colloquially "Chincha") is one of nine districts of the Anta Province in Peru and about 2 hours outside of Cusco. Its capital, Chinchaypujio, hosts a weekly market (Mercado Ferial de Chinchaypujio) as well as the regional government. The district is home to 9 communities: Chinchaypujio, Ocra, Paucarccoto, Parcotica, Waccahualla, Huancancalla, Sumaru, Pantipata and Huamumayo. In its southernmost part, the Apurímac River crosses the district; a major trade road connecting the Cuzco Department with the Department of Apurímac crosses through the entire district from north to south.

== Geography ==
The district of Chinchaypujio has a 2,000-metre (6,600 ft) altitude spread from south to north; hence, the district is home to multiple climate zones. In the south, the Apurímac River runs at 2,200-metre (7,200 ft) elevation where Banana Isla Maleño and other tropical fruit can be grown, in the north, the Wintanayuq peak sits at approximately 4,200 m (13,800 ft), above the Tree line. Other mountains are listed below:

- Aqu Qalla
- Iskay Patayuq
- Kunka Waylla
- Kuntur Marka
- Kuyuq
- Mawk'a Llaqta
- Puma Pata
- Qucha Pampa
- Quyllu Wank'a
- Quyllur Q'asa
- Q'usñi Pata
- Saqsa Urqu
- Sayaq Rumi
- Silla Pallqa
- Warankuyuq
- Wikuntuniyuq
- Willka Pampa
- Yana
- Yura Qaqa

== Agriculture ==
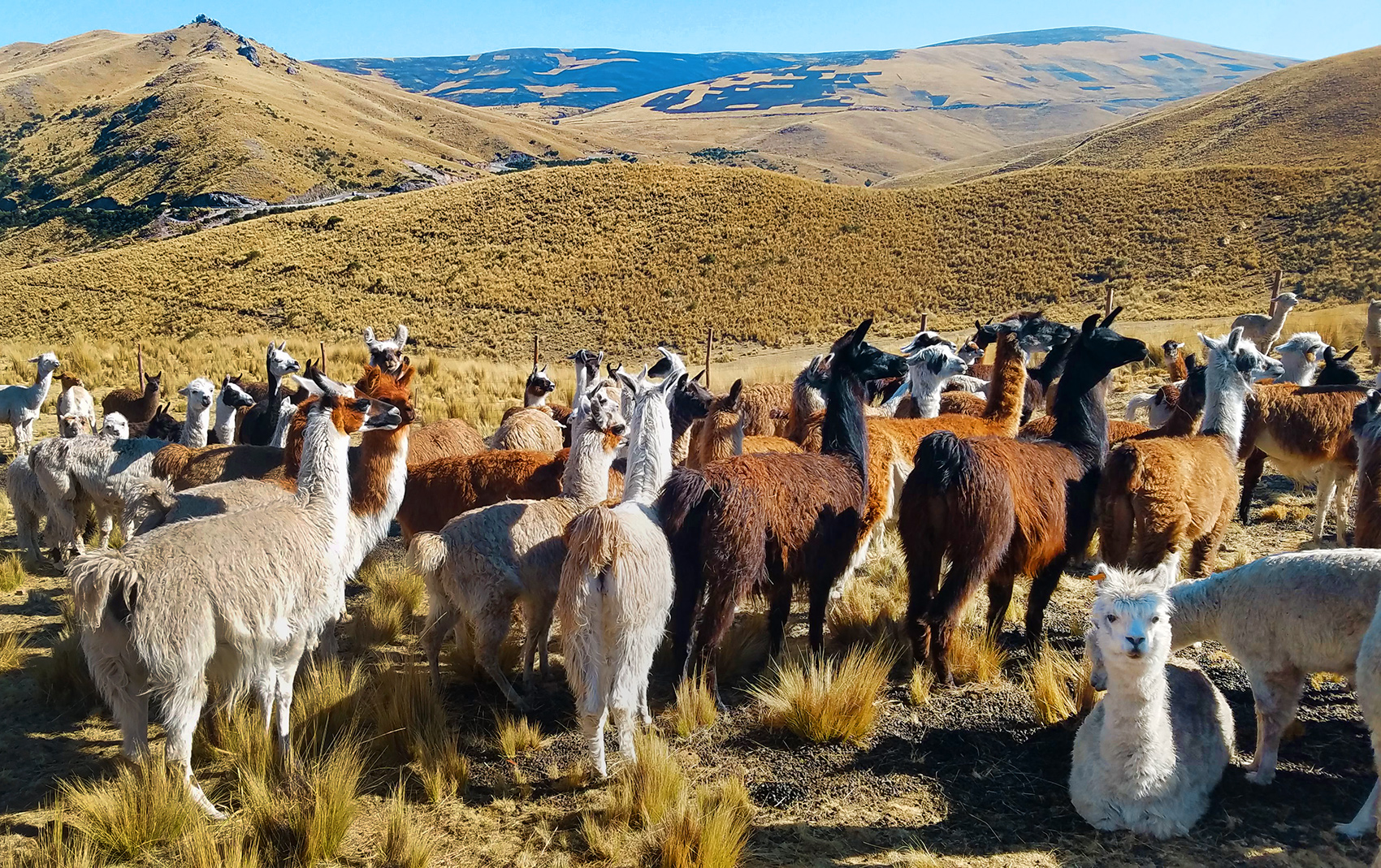
Llamas and Alpacas in Chinchaypujio, waiting to be led to their grazing grounds.

The local culture is strongly shaped by its Agrarian and Herding activities by farming families, which account for a majority of the local economy. The animals herded in the highlands of Chinchaypujio are the regionally native Llamas and Alpacas, as well as imported Sheep, Cattle, Chicken and Horses. Grazing grounds are often more than an hour away from the farm or herding corrall; most local shepherds need to do two round trips per day to bring the animals to and from the grazing grounds. A specialty of the region are the Andes-native Guinea pigs that are bred as livestock, as they have been for hundreds of years.

In the highlands, crops are being grown in a variety of sloped and flat fields. They are mostly Tuber plants - approximately 40 species of Potatoes (Olluco, Maswa and Añu among others). Secondary crops include Quinoa, Wheat, Beans, Tarwi, Maize and Barley. The rugged terrain makes the use of mechanised agriculture impossible in many areas, so fields are traditionally ploughed by human labor alone, or with the assistance of horses. The flour generated from some of the crop is used in a traditional sweetened breakfast drink, similar to Oatmeal, which is sometimes mixed with coffee. A popular locally produced drink is Chicha, a sweet corn beer.

In the Apurimac basin and adjacent lowlands, higher temperatures enable plantations of Bananas, Papayas, Avocados and other more tropical crops for agriculture.

== Culture ==
Chinchaypujio is home to many festivities throughout the year; many of them featuring parades and dances with colorful costumes. Behind each type of costume and character in the parade is an involved history, often a response to tragic events in the form of a costume that parodies the historical predecessor. Each Dance troupe organizes themselves, represents one kind of costume, and is led by a Caporal and president.

Chincha's communities are actively committed to protecting their Quechua, natural and agricultural heritage, such as Ocra's efforts in preserving ancestral knowledge. In a competition between 14 countries in Latin America with 300 nominations, a project from Chinchaypujio won the CRESPIAL award for "Protecting [its] Intangible Cultural Heritage" in 2014 for the Culture and Indigenous Rights of the District Municipality of Chinchaypujio.

=== Costumes and dances in Chinchaypujio ===
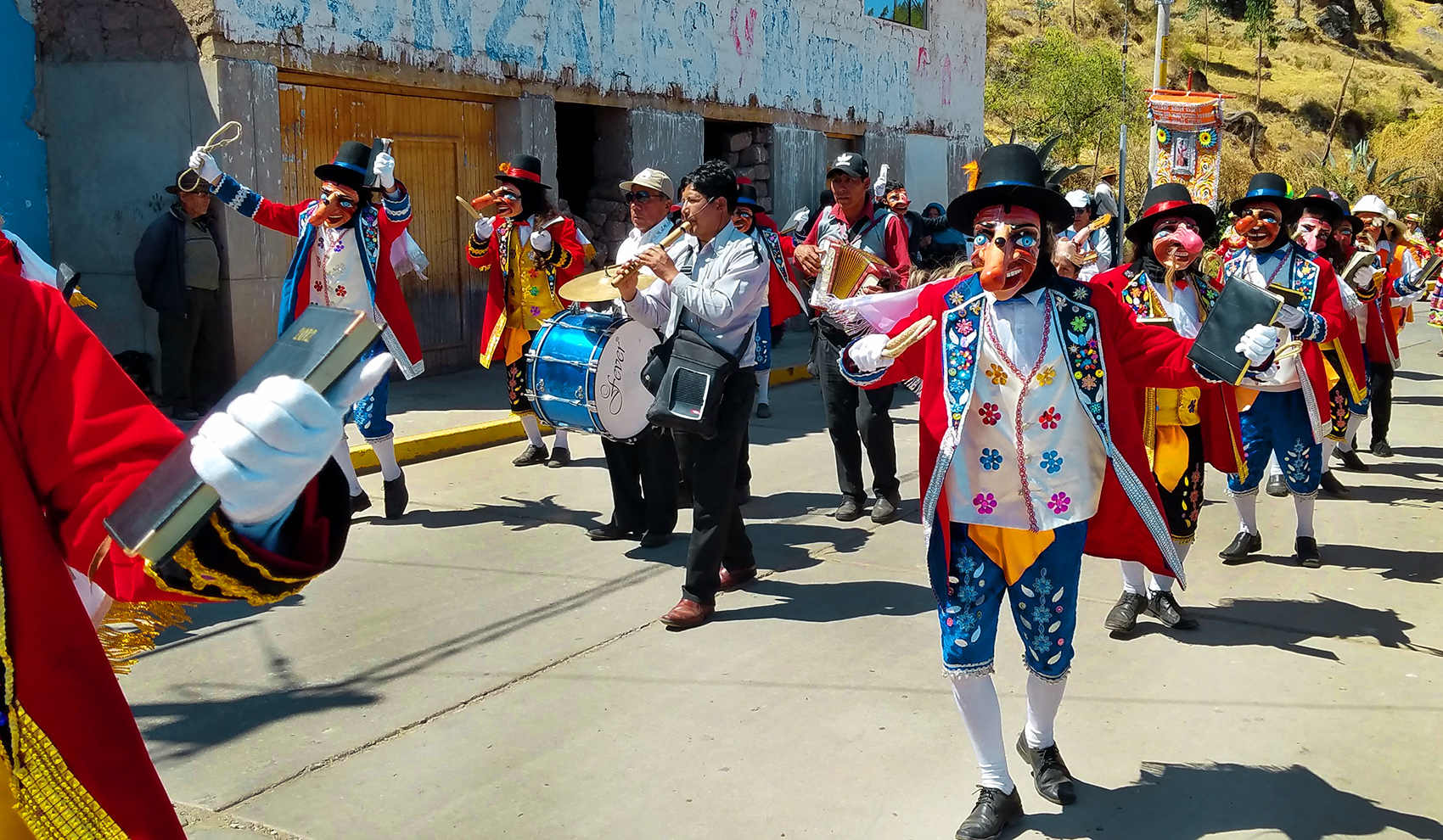
Siqllas Chinchaypujio dancers in Chinchaypujio

- Cchuchu: The most important of all the costumes in the parades. Cchuchu was - unlike most others - originally created in Chinchaypujio. It was inspired by a dream, in which the Holy mother allegedly asked for a dance involving trembling gestures and leather. The Cchuchu dancers carry willow branches, dress in white and tremble during their dance ritual.
- Huayllascha: An Inca-era dance in which single men and women dance with the hope of generating marriages among each other. Women wear multiple strands of braided hair (similar to open Cornrows), overslung round hats and black dresses with colorful accents.
- Q'Apaq Negro: A colonial-era dance, mostly performed by men, remembering the period of slavery for Afro-Peruvians. It features locals with round hats, scarfs around their waistline, blue pants, black masks, black gloves and small Sceptres with black hands. The dance symbolizes both the struggles of slavery; its colorful ornaments and shiny stones represent the strength of black people in colonial Peru gaining liberty.
- Saqras Chinchaypujio: These dancers represent the court of Lucifer; they enter the festivity at night with torches, simulating their arrival from hell. When the Virgin mary statue is brought out in the procession, the Saqras cover their faces to not make eye contact, symbolizing the divine power of Mary over the courts of hell. Large, long wigs with Deer horns and colorful, vertically striped full-body outfits are typical for this costume.

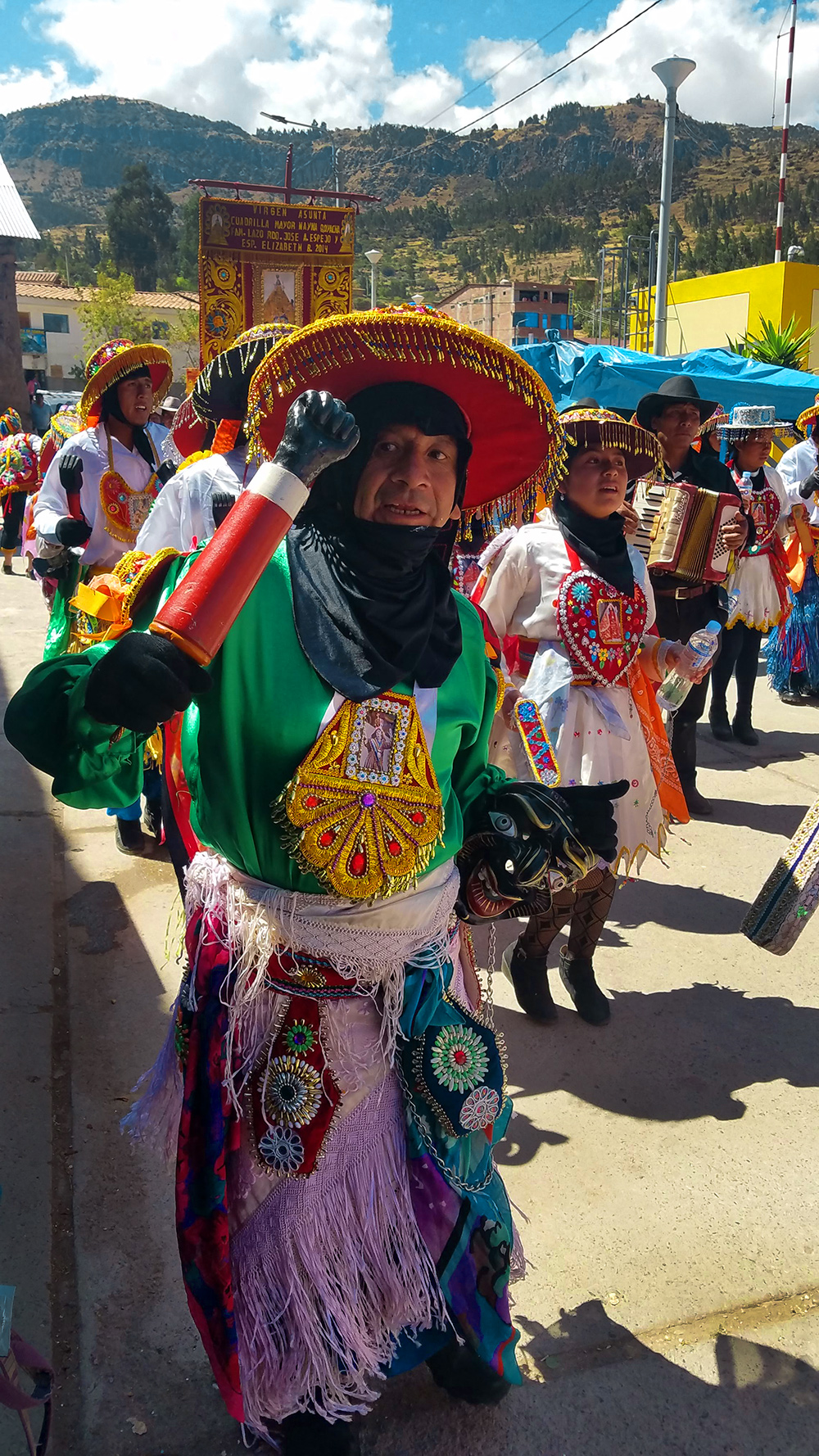
Q'apaq Negro and Negrillas dancers in the "Virgen Asunta" parade

- Negrillas: Women dancers representing freed black female slaves. Their dance is slow, a symbolic devotion to the Virgin Mary's role in their liberation from slavery. The dancers wear white dresses with circular hats and black scarfs around their necks, but do not use masks.
- Q'Apaq Qolla: These dancers represent the historical trade of cheese, Quinoa and other products between the Collao/Puno region and the Anta Province including Chinchaypujio. This trade resulted in prosperity for both trade partners, so the dance is an homage to the trade relationship between the two regions. Dancers wear white fabric masks, green-yellow scarfs and large red plates on their backs.
- Mollos Tinkus: This dance is only performed in the months of May through July; it is a Harvest festival aspect of the Potato farming in the region of Chinchaypujio. While mainly inspired by harvest, the choreography of the dance features "rhythmic funny hip movements" symbolizing water and Sexual intercourse in a light-hearted manner. Female dancers wear wide skirts that billow during the dance movements, and are decorated with horizontal, colorfully stitched Handicraft.
- Wayna Q'Oyacha: This dance is performed by female "Qoyachas" and male "Huaynas", all of them single, demonstrating and celebrating their willingness to get married. The women wear white and pink dresses, the men colorful Inca-style hats, wild masks and red vests. This dance is popular throughout the whole Cusco Region.

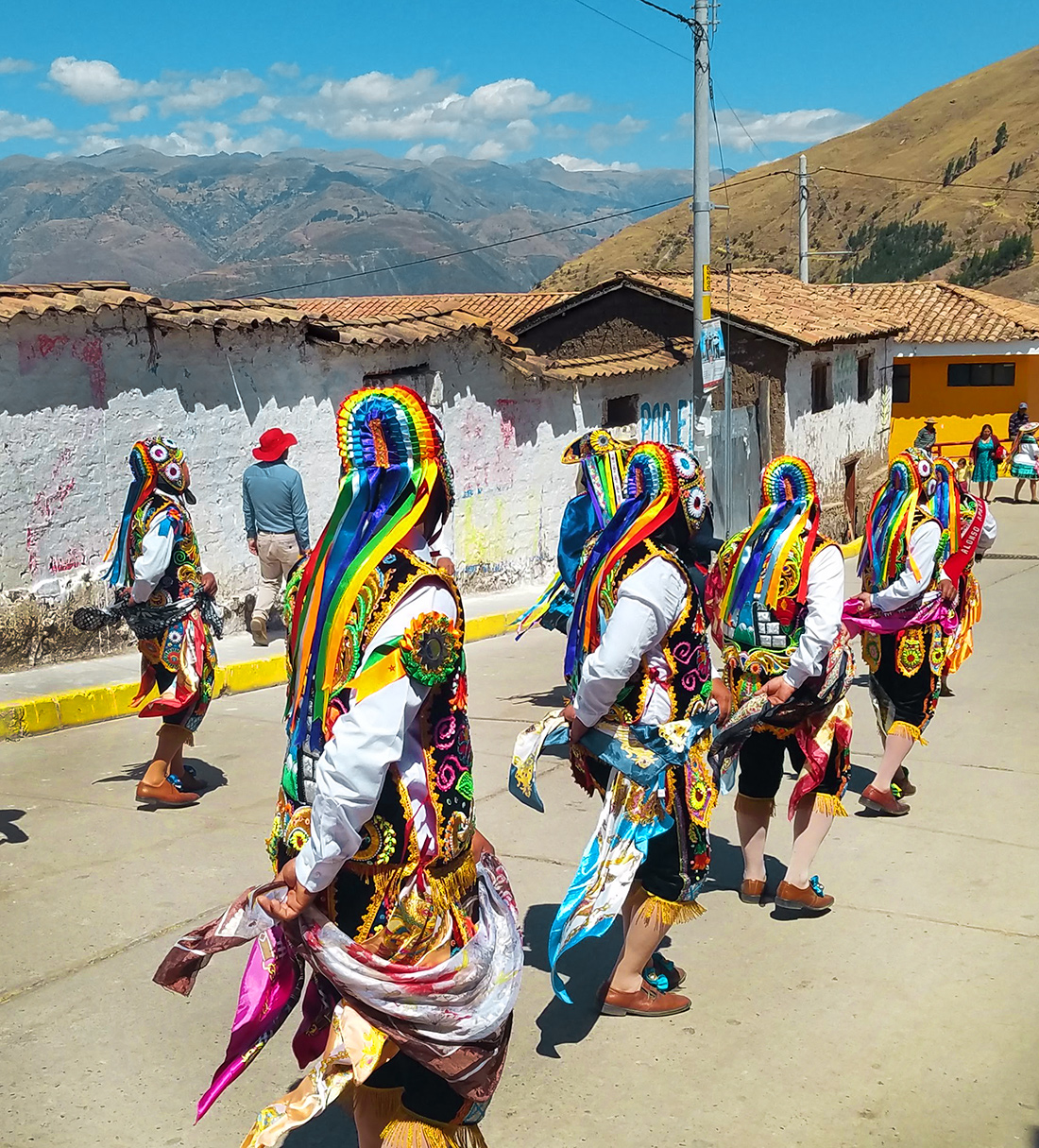
Contra Danzas in a Chinchaypujio parade

- Contra Danza: A dance of Colonial Peruvian origin. It parodies the colonial elite who, at the time, would reject Indigenous and Mestizo people from their ballroom parties in larger cities like Cusco. The dance was started by farmers who organized their own "contra danzas" - literally, "Against Dances" - in protest of the Spanish elites. Leading the dance troupe is a person dressed in blue like a Landlord of the time; other dancers wear red scarfs around their hips and colorful pants.
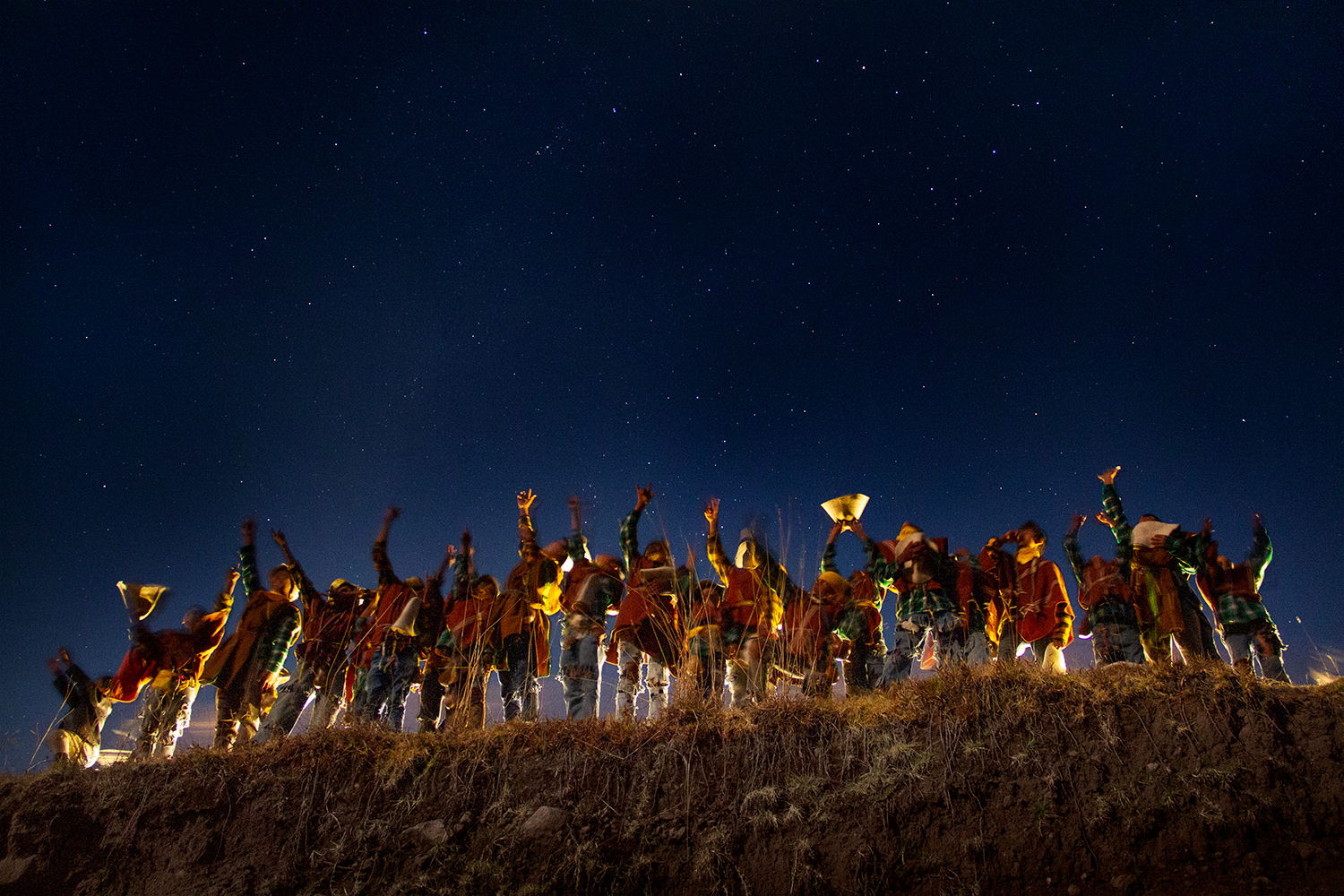
  The Coca Saruy dancing child troupe Terrala Cocasaru in Chinchaypujio after a parade
- Coca Saruy: This "return to home" dance and costume represents enslaved Peasants who were forced to move from the Andes mountains to the Peruvian Jungle in order to work on Coca plantations. Their pants are torn apart in order to symbolize the strenuous return journey back to the highlands. The choreography is light-hearted, as many of the workers returned after having escaped, just being glad to be alive. At the end of each dance performance, all performers drop to the ground, shaking violently - a memorial to the many that died of Malaria and other tropical diseases during their forced labor. The troupe features a nurse, a land owner and a military general, as the Government of Peru was militarily involved in the Coca worker's migration. In Chinchaypujio, a children's troupe and choir is part of this custom, the "Terrala Cocasaru". Children of this troupe end the dance by asking adult women for a dance, as a symbol for the happiness the farmers felt when they could reunite with their community. Dancers wear white felt hats, plaid shirts and torn denim pants.
- Majeños Chinchaypujio: These dancers satirize drunkards from the Majes-Arequipa region who came to the Cusco region with many goods, including liquor. The dancers wear wild masks, wide-brimmed white hats and brown leather jackets. The dance is of mestizo-republican origin.
- Siqllas Chinchaypujio: The dancers in this tradition represent corrupt Lawyers, Judges and other administrative government officials who wielded their power in an unfair way against the farmers of the region. The dance is popular around the Cusco region, and features masked dancers with colonial-style black hats, red or blue suits with white backs. The dancers rhythmically slap a black book with a small whip; the book represents the Penal code or Bible and is a symbol for abusing said authoritative writings to punish the poor rural population in a corrupt manner. Some troupes also include a Construction manager with a Hard hat and a Politician in suit and tie, slapping stacks of dollar bills in their hands instead. The dance style is light-hearted and satirical.
- Auqa Chileno: A dance invented by Peruvian war veterans of the War of the Pacific, satirizing their Chilean opponents. Dancers wear conical hats and large-nosed masks.
- Runa Toro: This dance happens primarily in the Bullring, with a two humans pretending to be in a Bullfight. They wear fluffy costumes and use a Quechua-style patterned blanket as a representation of the usually bright-colored blanket used in real bull fights. This dance is often performed to open or close a real bullfight.

Many of the costumes in Chinchaypujio feature Court dress-style black buckled shoes, a satirical commentary on colonial Aristocracy.

== Tourism ==
Chinchaypujio's rural setting offers Farm stay tourism in Ocra and Paucarccoto through the Quechua School initiative, as well as trekking in the mountains, river rafting in the Apurimac and authentic local experiences including livestock herding. On Sundays, the Mercado Ferial in Chinchaypujio draws crowds from all over the district and as far as Cusco, featuring local foods and goods. The district is also home to the archeological Inca Empire sites of Qollmay and Pumawasi; the town of Chinchaypujio itself contains the Incahuasi archaeological site.

Multiple annual events give rise to district-wide festivities, mostly celebrated in the capital of the district, Chinchaypujio. The largest festival is a 4-day celebration during mid-August to honor the Assumption of Mary, "Virgen Asunta de Chinchaypujio". This festivity includes dances, parties, parades, a small music festival and hosts guests from all over Peru - many of which are people who moved away from Chinchaypujio after high school and return for the festivity and family reunions.

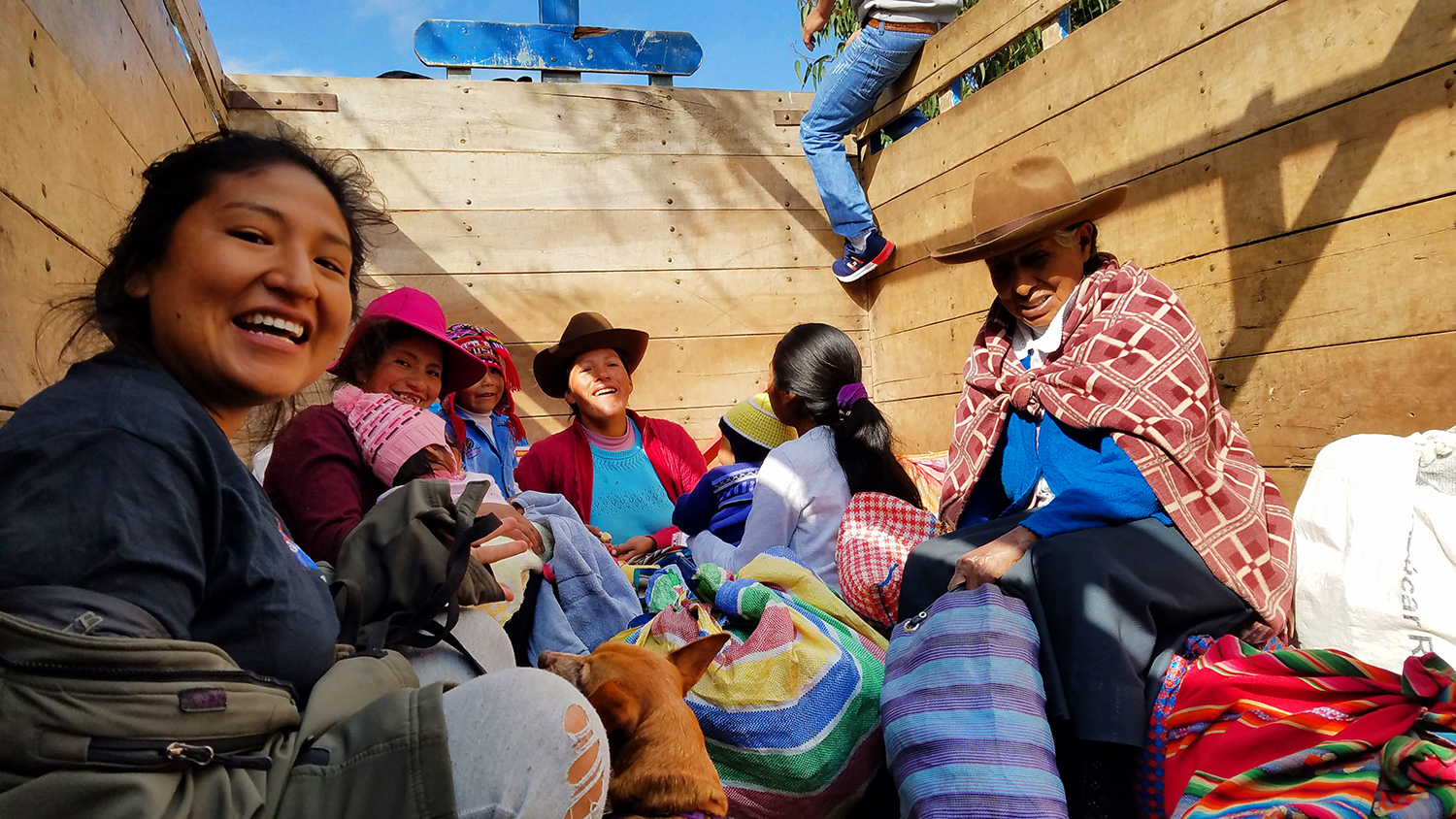
Locals and a volunteer transporting goods in a livestock truck to the Chinchaypujio market

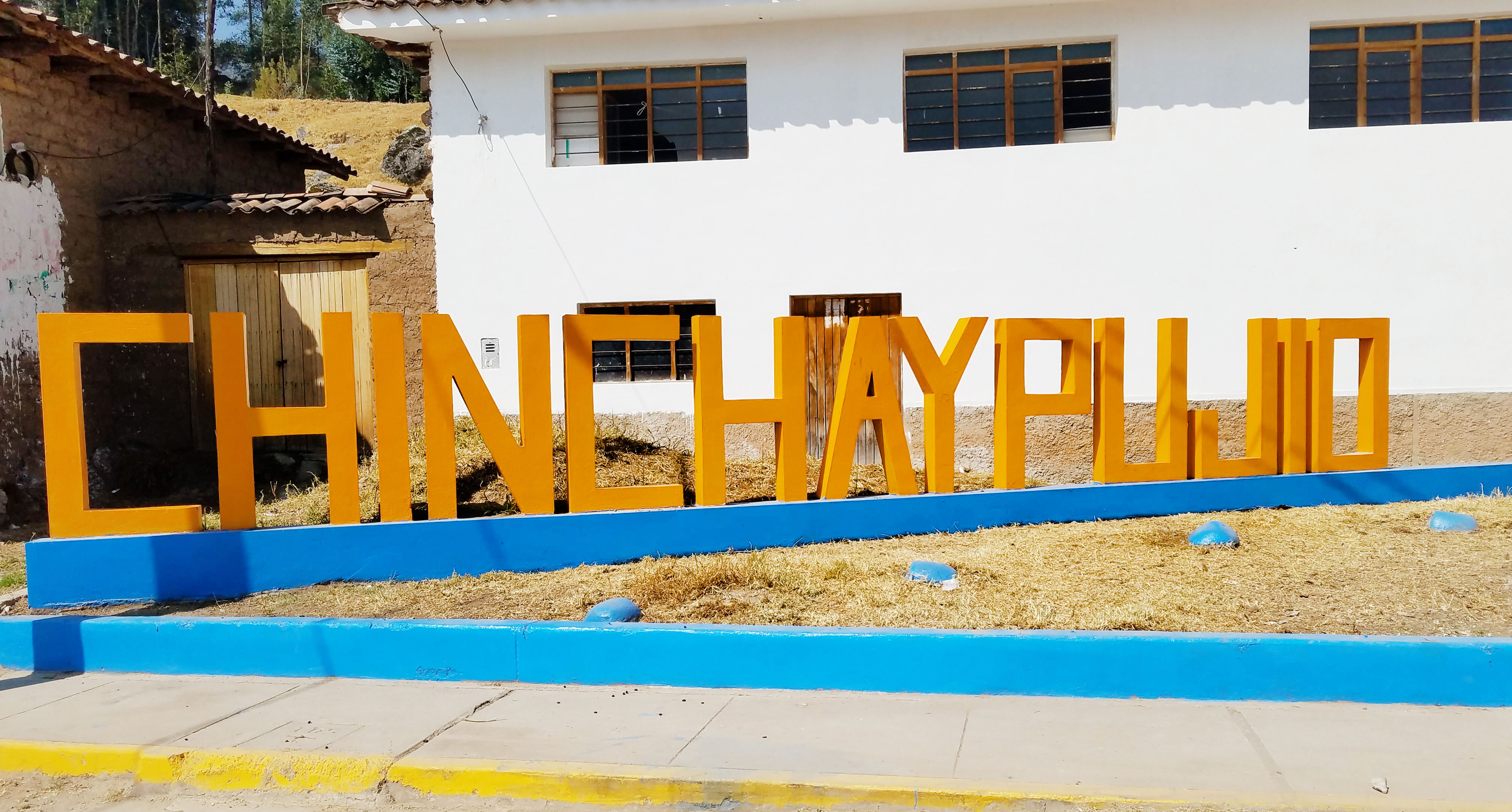
Chinchaypujio Town Sign

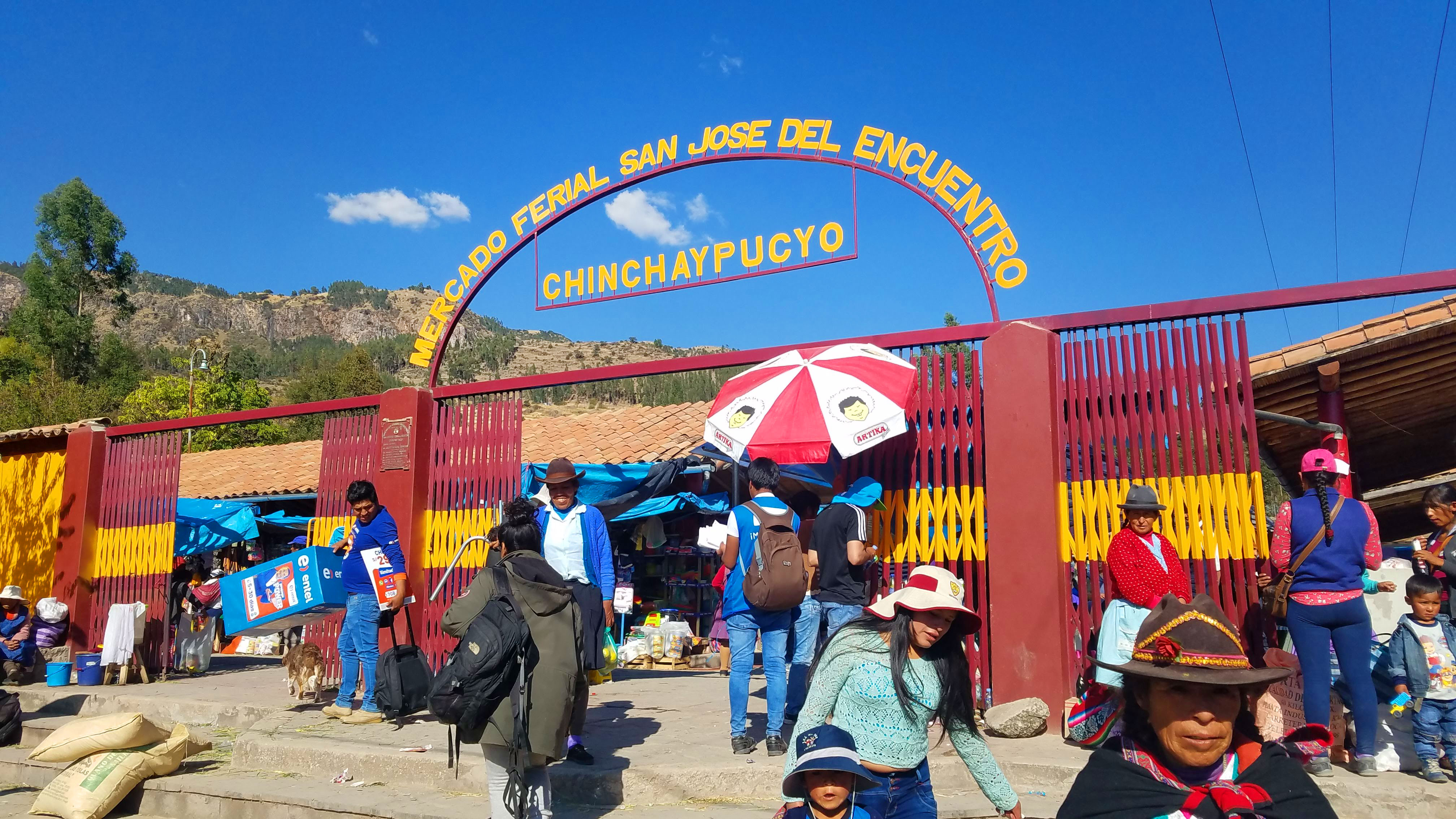
Entrance to the Mercado Ferial San Jose del Encuentro market in Chinchaypujio

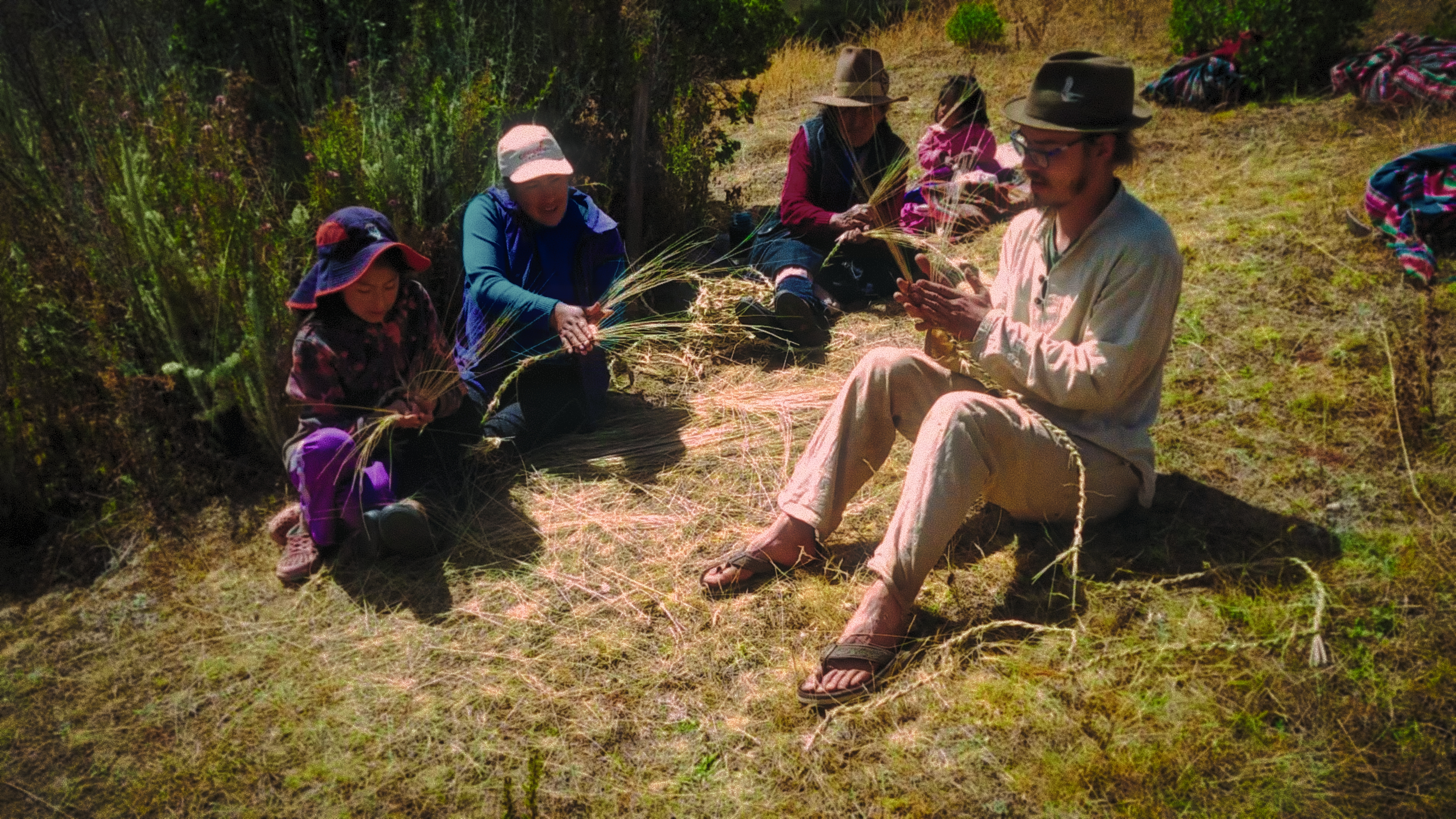
Volunteer learning how to build a hand-made Rope out of grass

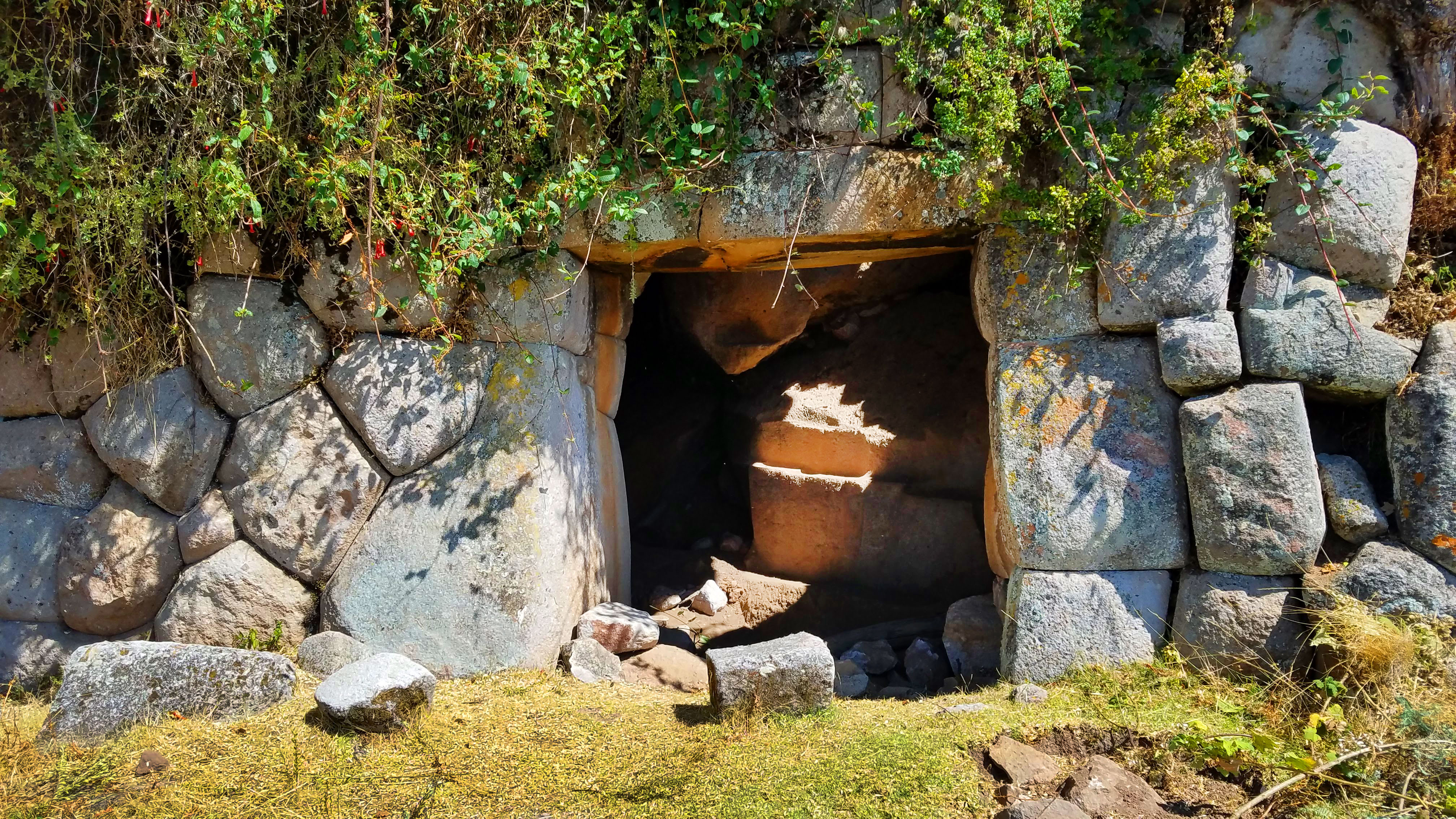
A temple at the Qollmay archeological complex

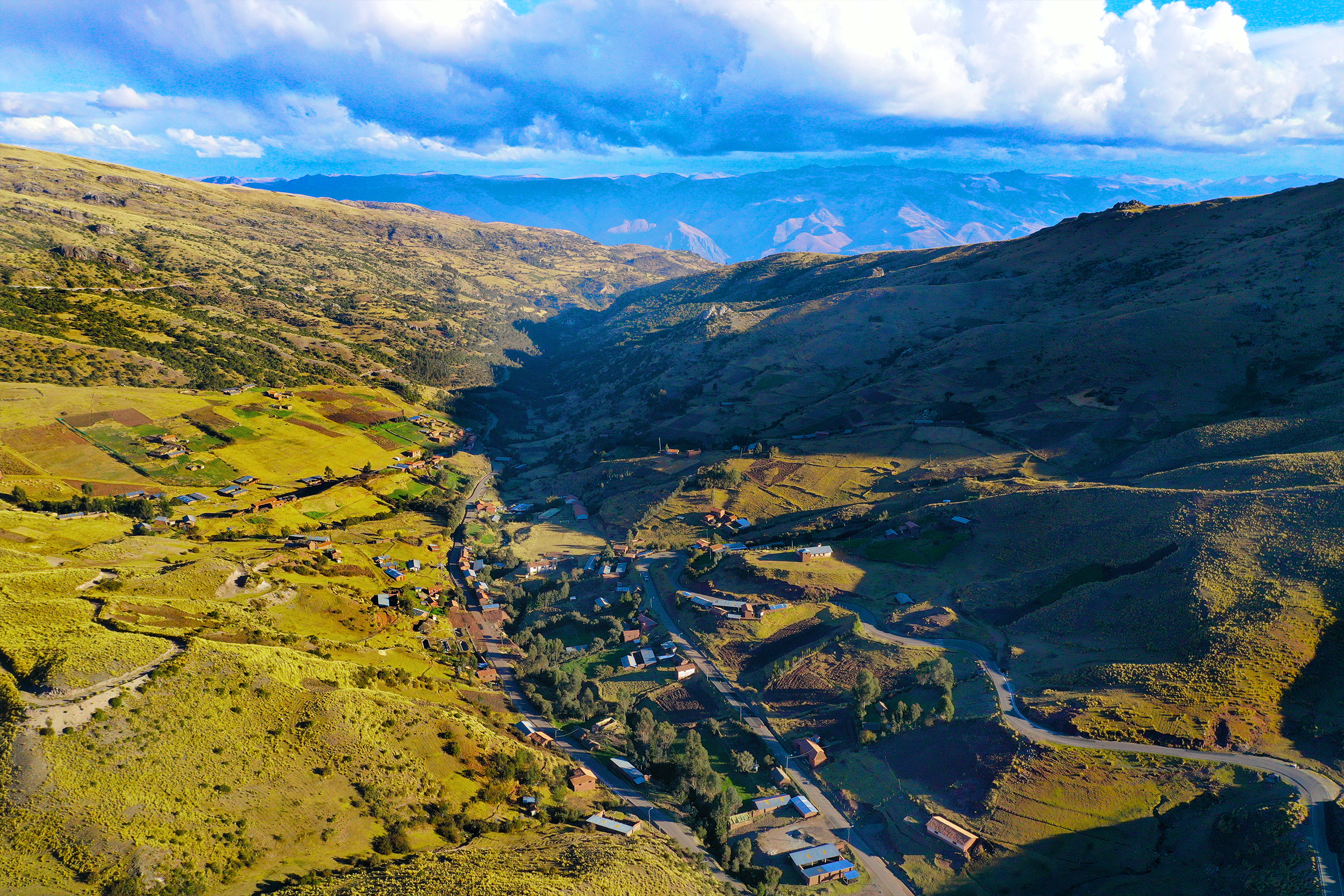
Aerial view of the town of Ocra, located within the Chinchaypujio district.

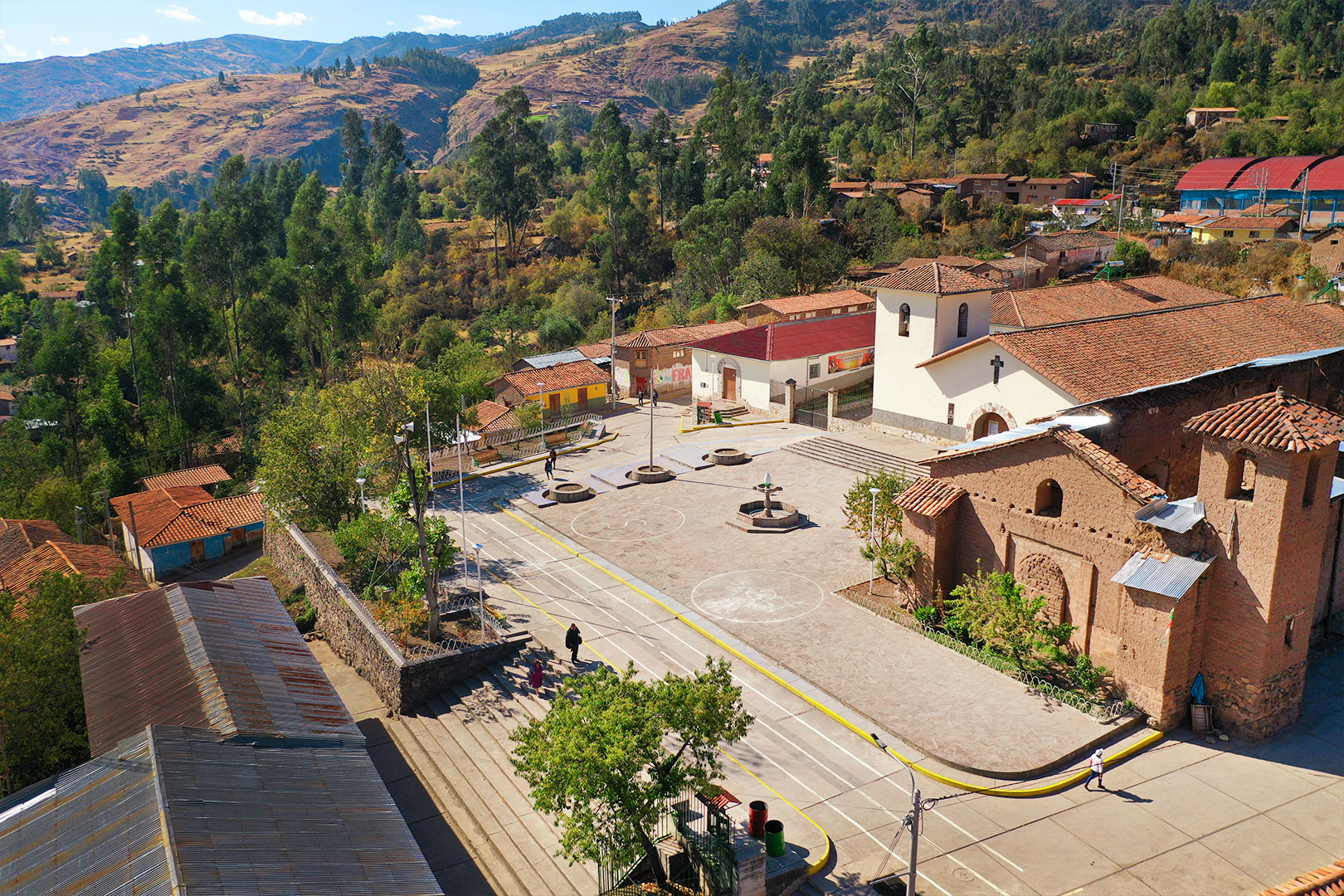
Plaza de Armas in Chinchaypujio

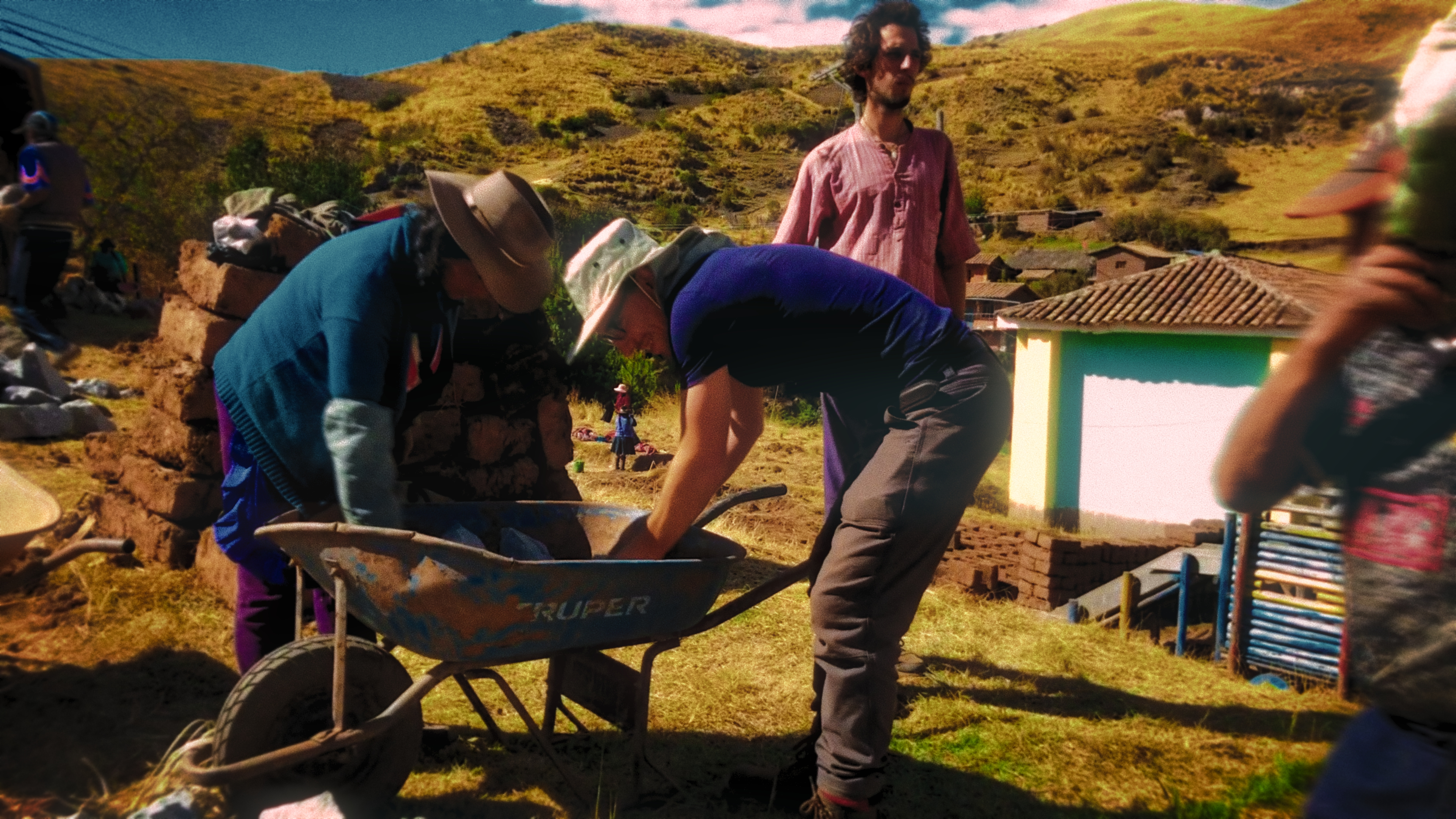
Communal kitchen building with volunteers in Ocra

== Climate ==
Chinchaypujio's winters (May–August) are mild and dry, its summers (Nov–Feb) are slightly warmer and much wetter with 162mm of rain, as is usual for this region. Nights can drop below freezing point in the winter. Temperatures vary strongly throughout the district though, due to its altitude spread between the North (mountains) and South (the Apurímac River basin).

Climate data for Chinchaypujio
Month	Jan	Feb	Mar	Apr	May	Jun	Jul	Aug	Sep	Oct	Nov	Dec	Year
Mean daily maximum °C	19.7	19.4	19.6	20.2	20.1	19.6	19.4	20.5	20.3	21.8	21.4	20.1	20.2
Daily mean °C	13	13	13	12.7	11.8	10.5	10.4	11.3	12.3	13.8	13.7	13.2	12.4
Mean daily minimum °C	6.4	6.6	6.4	5.3	3.5	1.5	1.4	2.1	4.4	5.8	6.1	6.4	4.7
Average precipitation mm	162	123	108	44	5	3	4	9	26	50	84	116	734
Mean daily maximum °F	67.5	66.9	67.3	68.4	68.2	67.3	66.9	68.9	68.5	71.2	70.5	68.2	68.3
Daily mean °F	55	55	55	54.9	53.2	50.9	50.7	52.3	54.1	56.8	56.7	55.8	54.3
Mean daily minimum °F	43.5	43.9	43.5	41.5	38.3	34.7	34.5	35.8	39.9	42.4	43.0	43.5	40.4
Average precipitation inches	6.4	4.8	4.3	1.7	0.2	0.1	0.2	0.4	1.0	2.0	3.3	4.6	28.9
Source: Climate-Data.org

== Ethnic groups ==
The people in the district are mainly indigenous citizens of Quechua descent. Quechua is the language which the majority of the population (91.85%) learnt to speak in childhood, 7.95% of the residents started speaking using the Spanish language (2007 Peru Census).

== See also ==
- Quechua people
- Qollmay
- Pumawasi
