= Qollmay =

Archaeological site in Peru

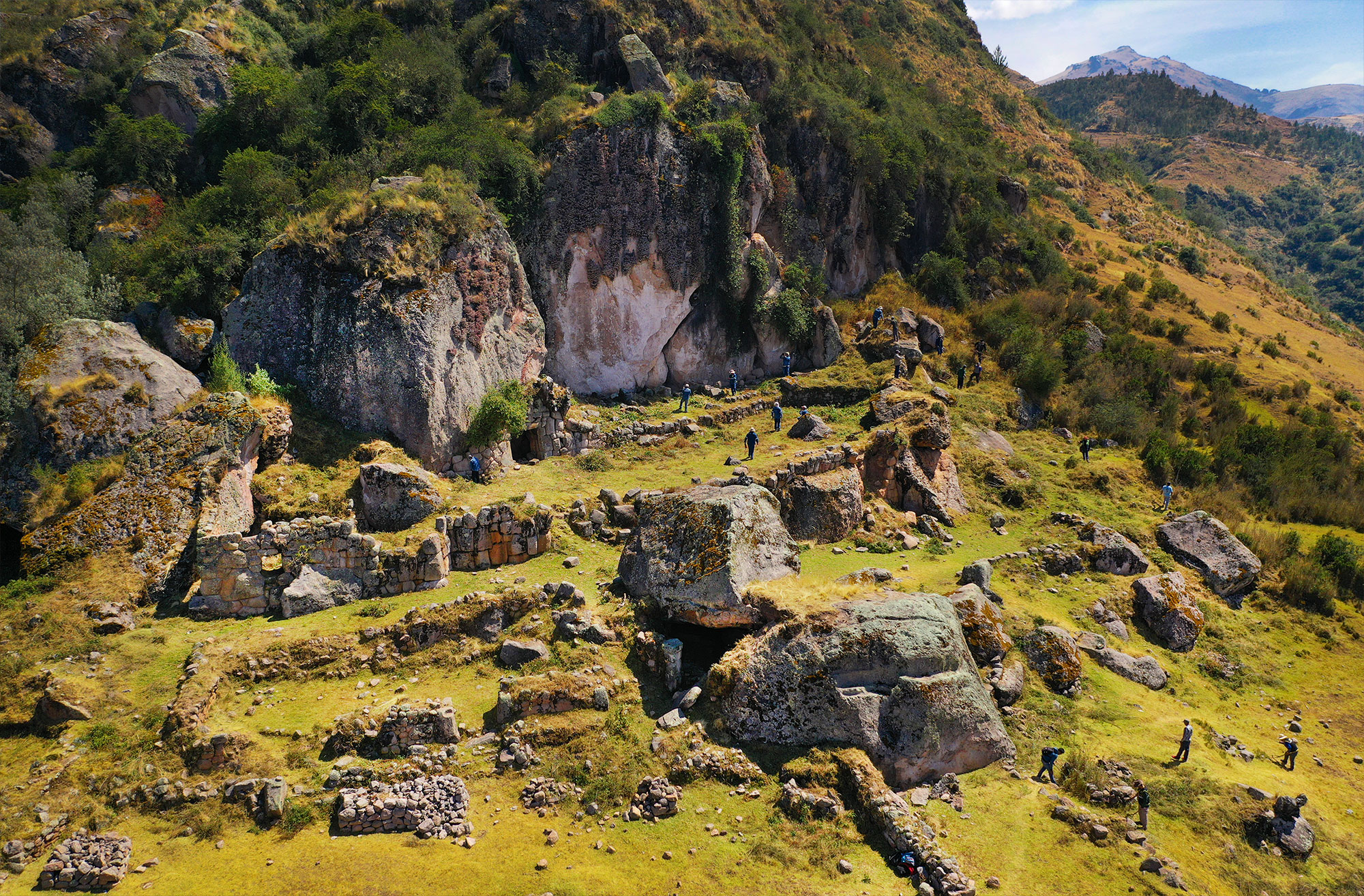
- Interactive map of Qollmay
- 13°36′49.8″S 72°15′45.1″W
- Type: Temple
- Cultures: Inca Empire
- Location: Peru, Cusco Region, Anta Province, Chinchaypujio District
- Region: Andes

Site notes
- Length: 1,109 m (3,638 ft)
- Width: 1,109 m (3,638 ft)
- Area: 7.12 ha (17.6 acres)
- Archaeologists: Max Uhle, Ken Heffernan
- Public access: yes

Qullmay is an Inca Empire archeological site with multiple buildings along a granite cliff, assumed to be used for both administrative and religious practices. It is located in the Cusco Region, Anta Province, Chinchaypujio District, Peru at 3,436 m altitude. Qollmay is 4 km North-West (about a 25-minute drive on dirt road) of Chinchaypujio, on the way to the campesino community of Sumaru.

First excavated by Max Uhle in 1905 and registered by Ken Heffernan in 1986, it has been classified in 6 sectors and has about a dozen foundations, half a dozen well preserved walls and one well preserved walled-off natural cavern with Inca-style stonework inside, located within sector 1. This cavernous building is thought to be the most important one in the whole site. Adjacent to it is a rock formation reminiscent of a birth canal, speculated to be the site of fertility rituals.

The site is embedded within Inca-made, rectangular terraces, now overgrown with grass.

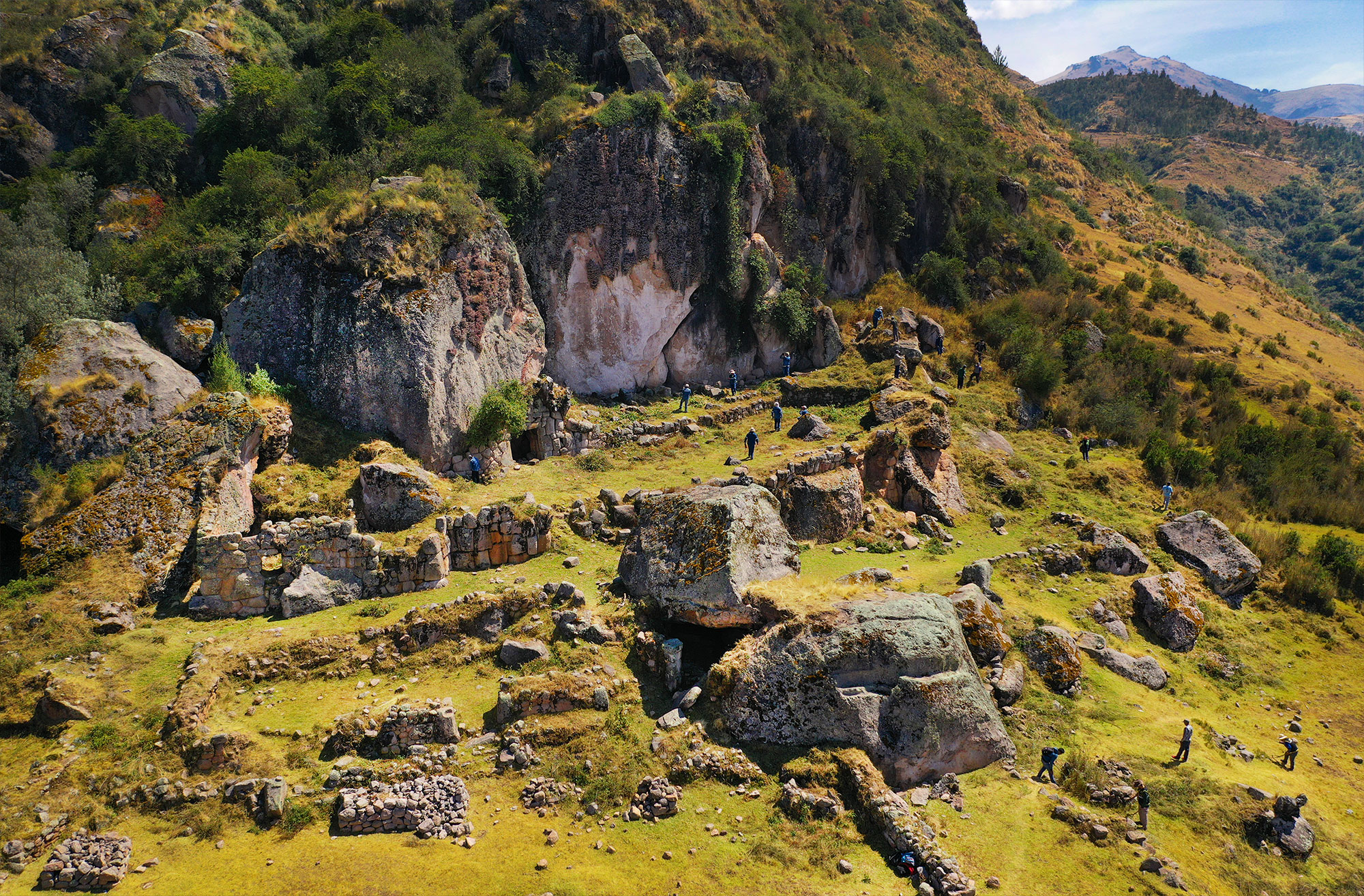
Qollmay Archaeological Site as seen from above

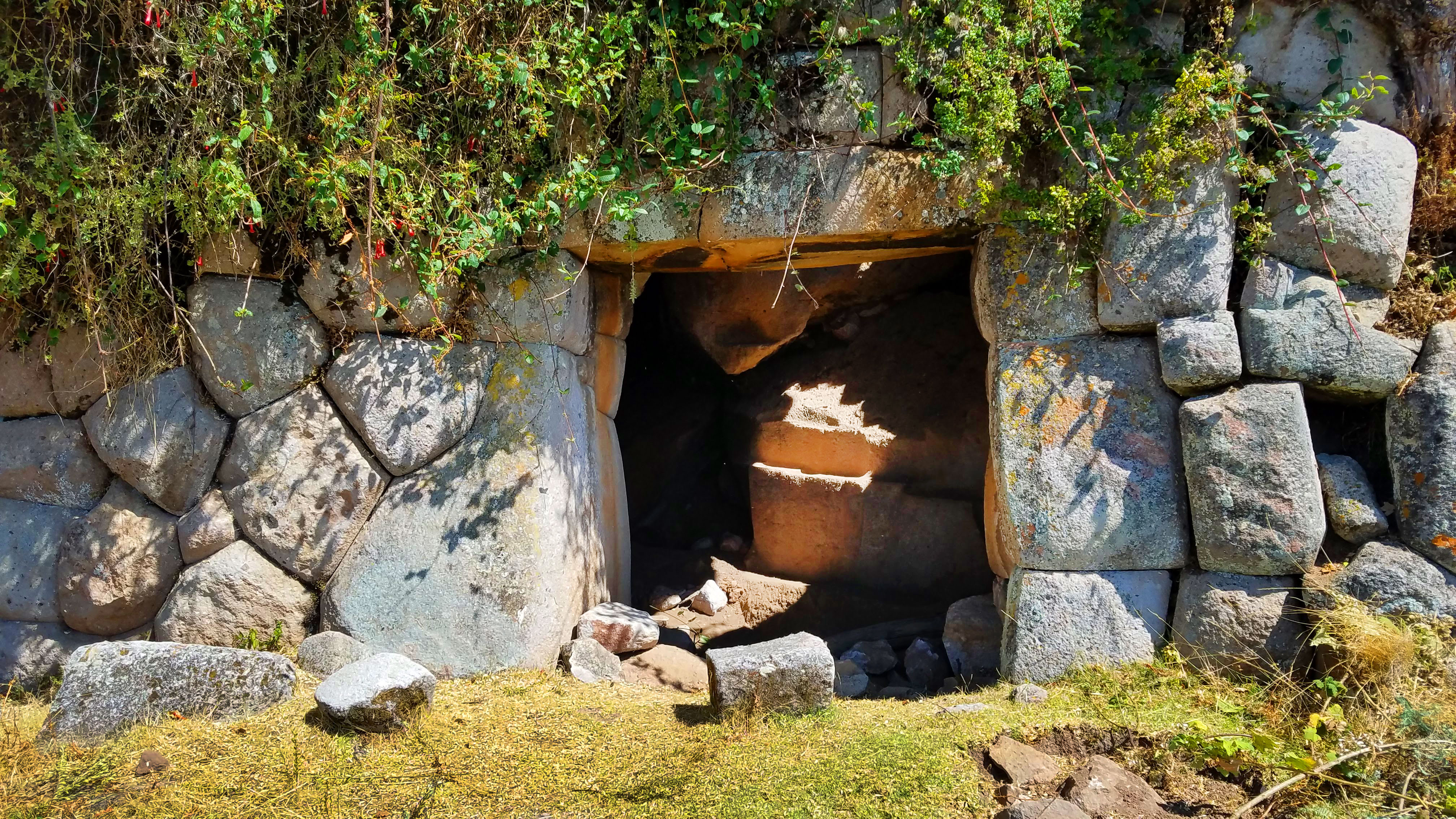
Outside of the main cave entrance

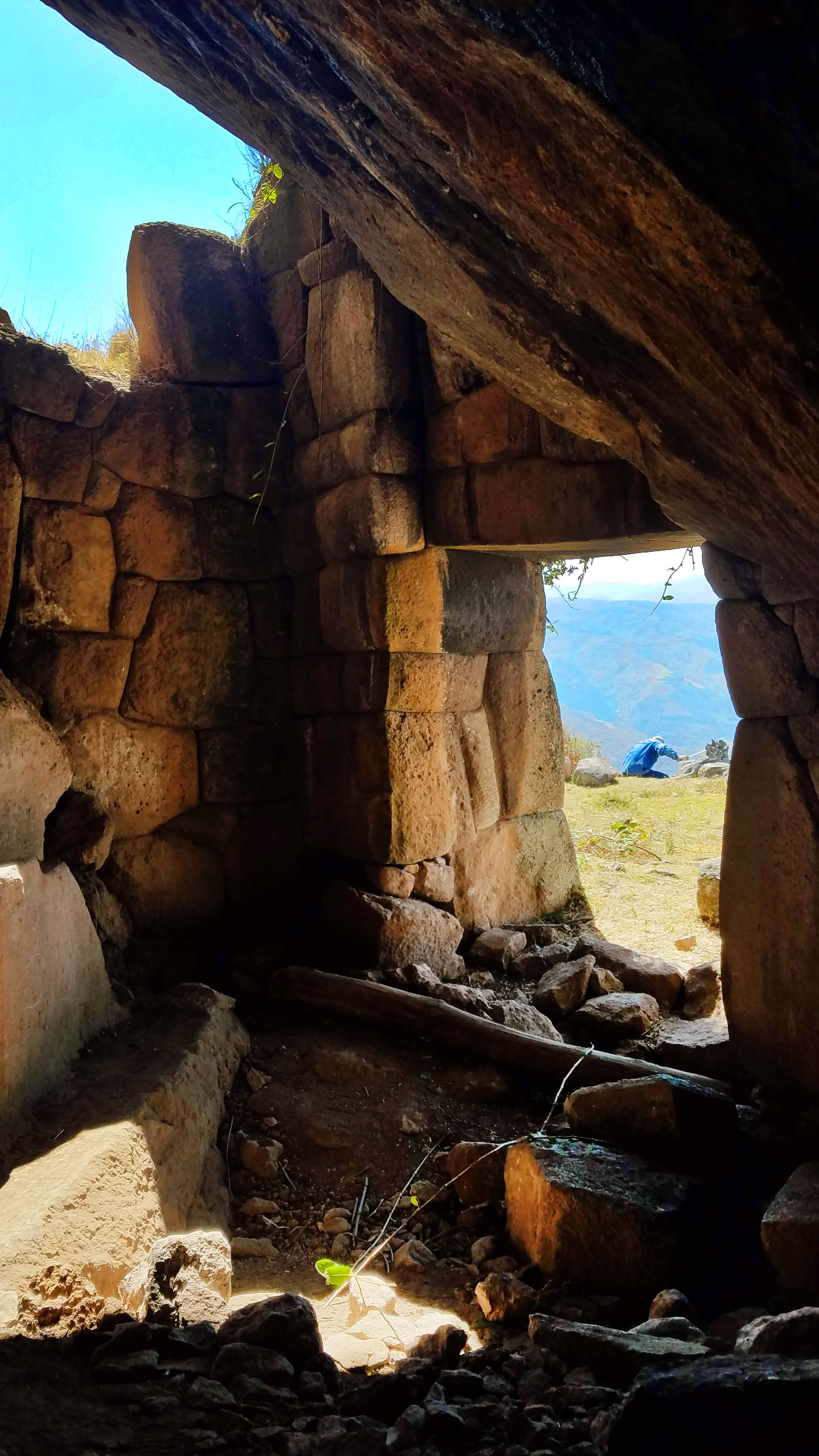
Inside of the Qollmay main building cave

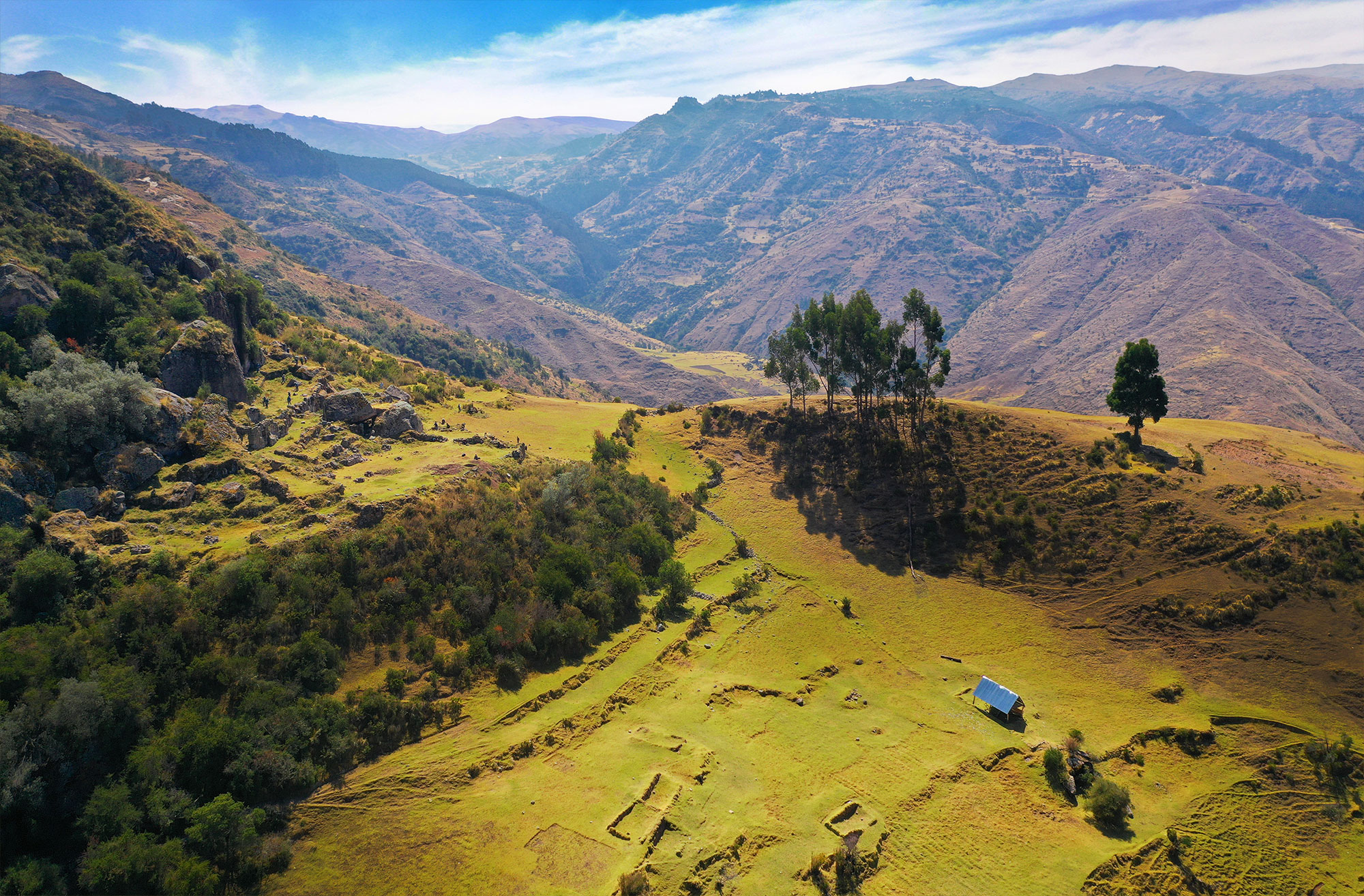
Archaeological Site as seen from above, with entire footprint of other buildings and remains.

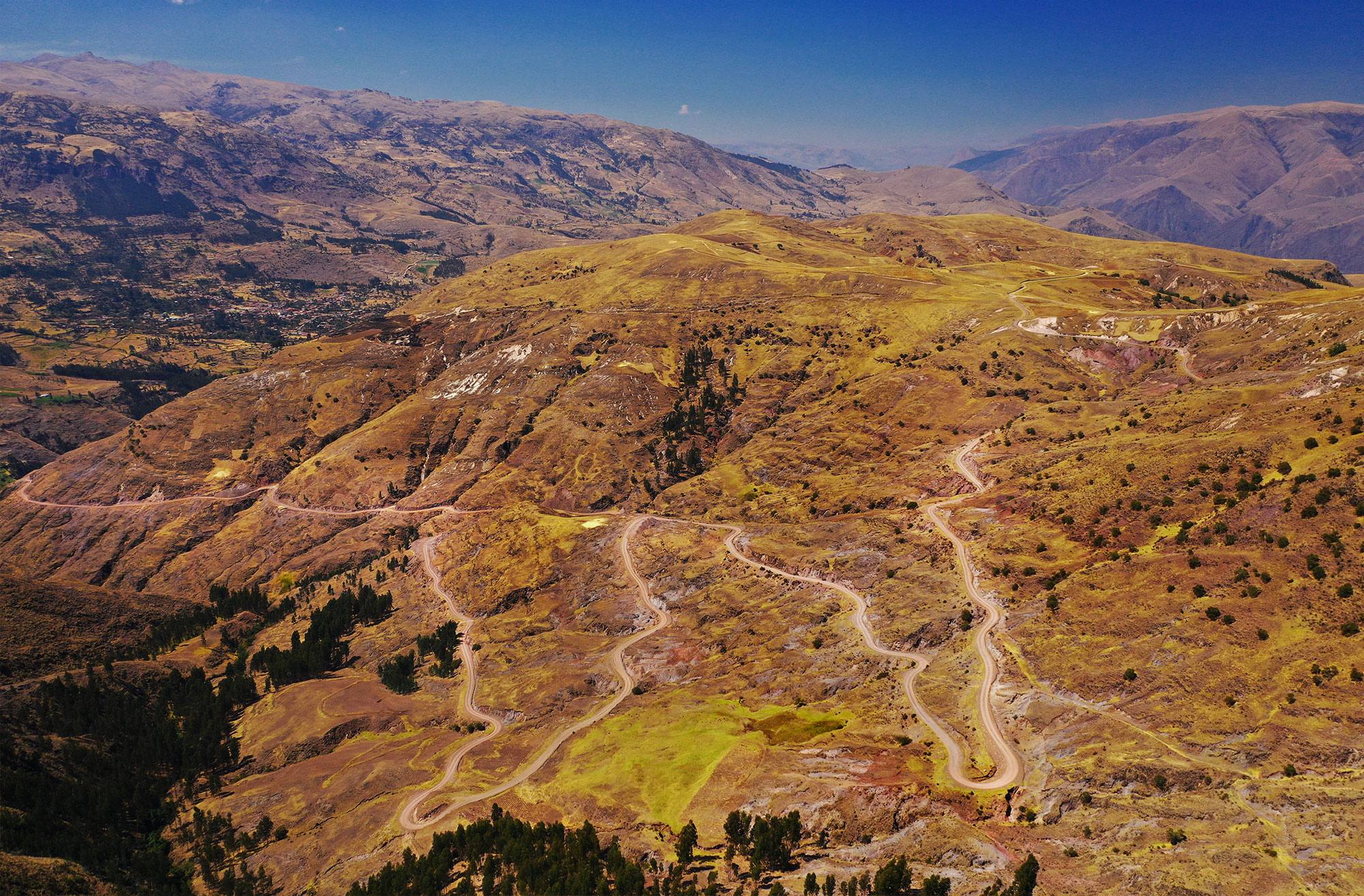
The unpaved Serpentine Road from Chinchaypujio to Qollmay

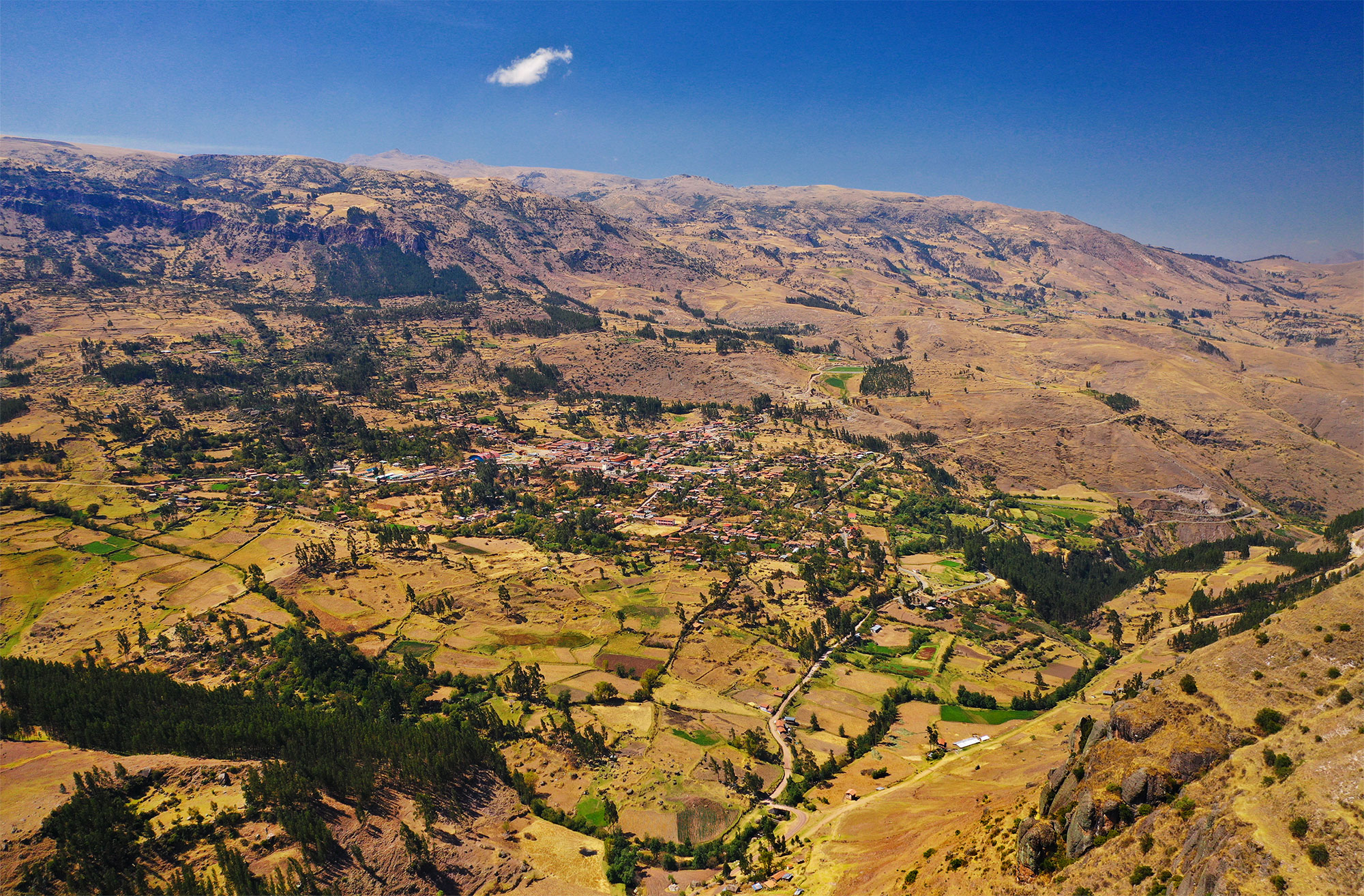
Chinchaypujio as seen from Qollmay.

== See also ==
- Killarumiyuq
- Tampukancha
- Pumawasi Cave
- Chinchaypujio District
