= Pumawasi, Anta =

Archaeological site in Peru

Pumawasi
- Interactive map of Pumawasi
- 13°32′36″S 72°15′50″W
- Location: Peru, Cusco Region, Anta Province, Chinchaypujio District
- Region: Andes

Site notes
- Height: 19 m (62 ft)
- Length: 22 m (72 ft)
- Width: 30 m (98 ft)
- Archaeologists: Silvia Flores Delgado
- Public access: yes

Pumawasi (Quechua (Quechua puma cougar, puma, wasi house, "puma house") is a rocky cave with pre-Columbian rock-art in Peru. It is situated in the Cusco Region, Anta Province, Chinchaypujio District. Pumawasi lies in the north of the district, west of the mountain Yuraqqaqa (Yurajaja, Yurajqaqa).

The cave is about 22 metres (72 ft) deep, 19 metres (62 ft) and measures about 30 metres (98 ft) at its widest point. It was used as a burial ground, among other uses, as evidenced by human bone remains.

== See also ==
- Killarumiyuq
- Tampukancha
- Qollmay
