= Panakas =

Inca royal lineages

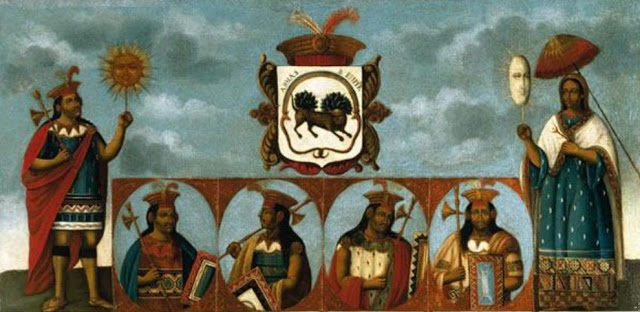
Genealogía de los Incas (Genealogy of the Incas) of the Cusco School, 18th century.

A panaca or panaqa, or panaka (Classical Quechua: panaqa, [paˈnaqa], lit. 'manager of a royal ayllu') was a family clan of the Sapa Inca, the kuraka or emperor of the Inca Empire. The panakas were formed by the descendants of a Sapa Inca or his wife. The basic social institution of the Incas is the ayllu. An ayllu is a group of families that descended from a common ancestor, united by culture and religion, in addition to the agricultural work, livestock and fishing of the same territory. The ayllu concept transcended into nobility, so that the royal kinship could establish a lineage, called panaca or royal house.

The panaca excluded the auqui (in Quechua awki), the crown prince, who would succeed him. When the designated successor became emperor, he would leave his original panaca and form his own one.

The panakas made up the Inca's court and formed the aristocracy of Cusco. They maintained multiple sacred shrines, performing ceremonies in the name of the ruler-founder emperor of the panaka, and maintaining the memory of the deceased emperor and his mallki (mummy), through songs, quipus and paintings that were transmitted from generation to generation.

In the spatio-temporal ceque system, in which each region, both Hanan (high), Anti Suyu and Chinchay Suyu, and Hurin (low), Cunti Suyu and Colla Suyu, had groups of three ceques, symbolic lines or pathways, the panakas were represented by the Payan ceque.

== Description ==
During the Inca Empire, most of the land was held by the ayllus (a kinship group whose members were related to one another through descent from a real or fictional common ancestor). Land was owned inalienably by the ayllu and not by individuals, while the decisions on the use of the ayllu lands by its members were made by the community kurakas (chiefs) that managed the property for the general benefit of the community. The panacas, as royal ayllus, followed the same rules: the ruling Inca, called Sapa Inca, was the chief of his panaka until he died and someone else became kuraka.

Panacas performed ceremonies in the name of the Inca and took care of the goods and alliances made during his reign. Each panaca owned holdings across the realm, including Inca royal estates and palaces in the sacred valley and the capital city of Cusco: the city core was composed principally of palatial enclosures known as kanchas, some of which were owned by the panakas.

Moreover each panaca had the task of maintaining one or more of the sacred shrines along the ceques, imaginary paths irradiating form Cusco towards the four Suyus (provinces) of the Tawantinsuyu (Inca Empire).

The members of a panaka made up the Sapa Inca's court which was also supported by their deceased ancestors who acted through their descendants, as if they were still alive. The panakas formed the aristocracy of Cusco, and represented factions and alliances capable of exerting influence in the decisions in the politics and conflicts of Inca history In this sense the panacas, particularly female ones, since the Incas had a long matrilineal tradition, influenced, among other things, the appointment of successors to the Sapa Inka position, elected by the law of the "most capable".

The panakas of Pachacuti Tupac Yupanui were the most important: due to the early expansion of the empire they were owners of great extensions of land with innumerable laborers and servants (yanakuna) in charge of their care and of their social status.

== Sacred functions ==
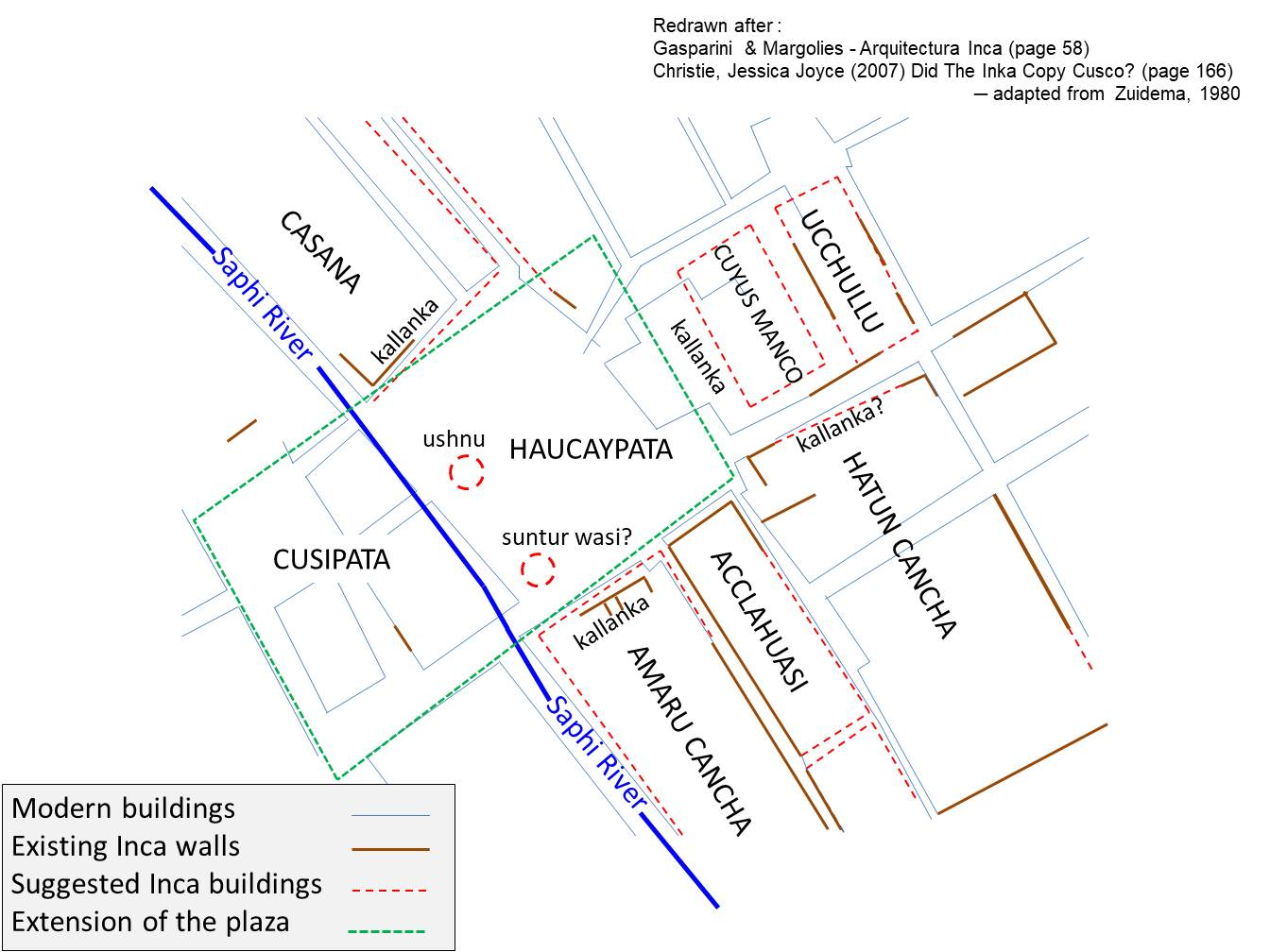
Cusco center at Inca time. Note that the plaza was much larger than today

Preserved and honored by the panaka, the mummies (mallki) of the Sapa Inca and his Qoya (also spelled colla, royal wife), conferred Huaca status, continued to hold significant influence over politics, meaning that in their names the panakas maintained an active interference in the political life of the Empire. The people could admire the mummies of the deceased Incas during the great festivals in Cusco, when they were exposed in the huge square of Haucaypata. During the festivals, the mummies were surrounded by their panaka. This tradition implied that a large group of individuals living in Cusco based their lives on the maintenance of the mummies.

The panakas were associated with both the ceque system and the irrigation of Cusco, and there existed a particular relationship between the panakas and the Cusco lands through the identification of each panaca with a system of chapas (agricultural spaces). This distribution was related to the existence of an Andean socio-territorial and spatio-temporal geographic division, based on ceques, imaginary lines starting from Cuzco and linking together 328 huacas (divinities, ancestors, and constellations personified in the landscape) Each panaka was in charge of one or more ceque and several shrines.

== List of panacas ==
Eleven imperial panakas existed in Cuzco, five from Hurin (lower) Cusco and six from Hanan (upper) Cusco, two complementary parts in Andean duality or yanantin separated into Chinchay Suyu (north) and Anti Suyu (east), for Hanan, and into Qulla Suyu (south) and Kunti Suyu (west), for Hurin, which were then separated into various ceques. Altogether they formed the capaccuna or the relationship among lords which is often considered as the official list of the panacas. In fact capaccuna is a plural name: in Quechua, qhapaq means the powerful one or the person of royal blood, and kuna is a plural suffix, therefore indicating the nobility of Cusco.

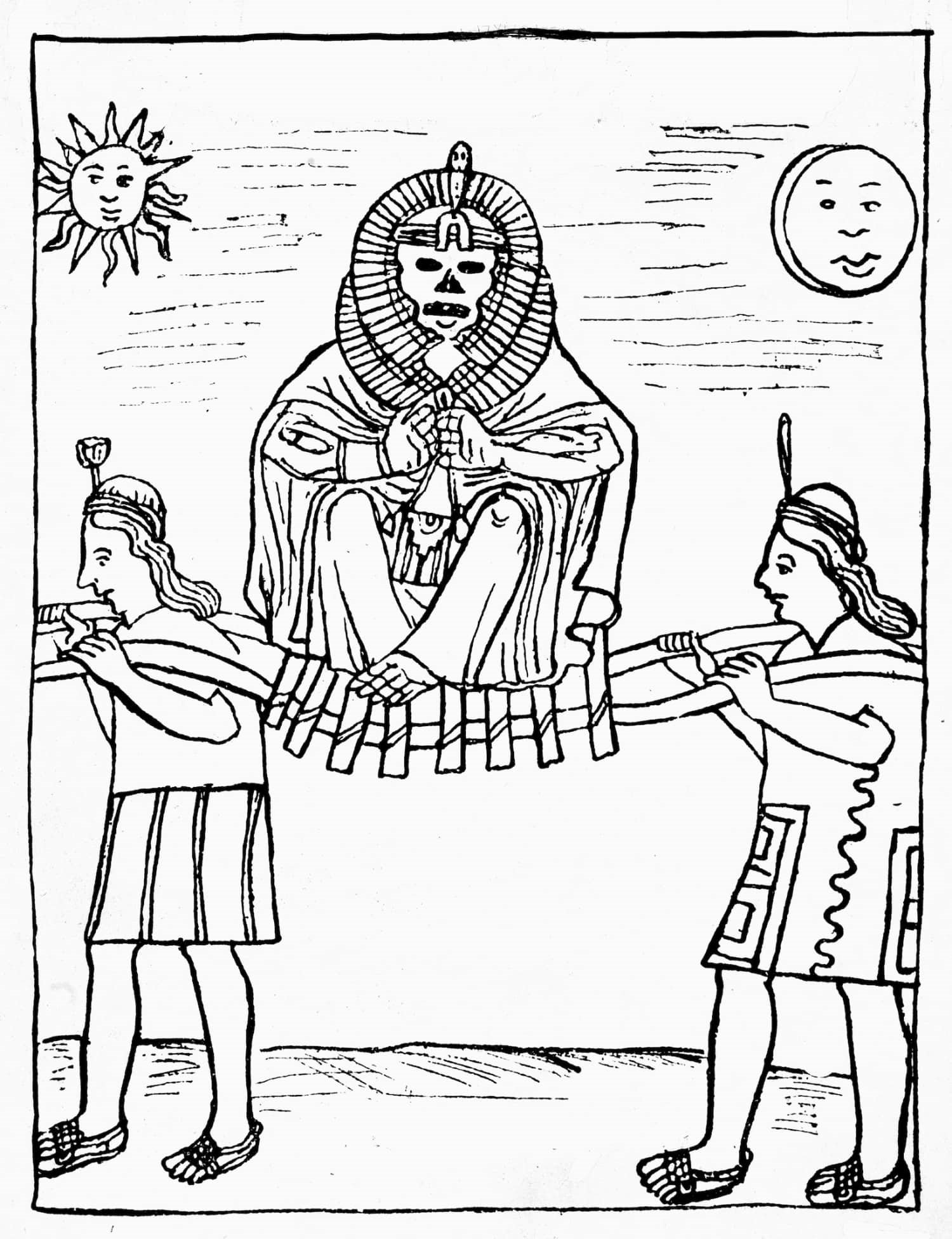
Inca mummy as depicted by Felipe Guaman Poma de Ayala in his El primer nueva corónica y buen gobierno

The priest and chronicler Cristóbal de Molina, in his manuscript Relación de las fábulas y ritos de los Incas (Account of the fables and rites of the Incas) of 1575 describes the situa (situwa raymi in Quechua), the solemn festival of health and purification that was celebrated by the Incas at the spring equinox, in September. During this festival the nobility of Cusco that gathered in the main square was divided into ten panakas only, instead of eleven, each associated with one of four suys (or provinces) of the Inca empire. Molina does not mention the Tumipampa Ayllu, the panaca of Wayna Qhapaq.

Panacas from the Hurin Qusco moiety:

- Chima Panaca Ayllu (Manku Qhapaqpa panacan), the royal house of Manku Qhapaq, related to Kuntisuyu.
- Rawra Panaca Ayllu (Sinchi Ruq'ap panacan), the royal house of Sinchi Ruqa, related to Kuntisuyu.
- Hawaynin Panaca Ayllu (Lluq'i Yupankip panacan), the royal house of Lluq'i Yupanki, related to Qullasuyu.
- Uska Mayta Panaca Ayllu (Mayta Qhapaqpa panacan), the royal house of Mayta Qhapaq, related to Qullasuyu.
- Apu Mayta Panaca Ayllu (Qhapaq Yupankip panacan), the royal house of Qhapaq Yupanki, related to Qullasuyu.

Panacas from the Hanan Qusco moiety:

- Wikakiraw Panaca Ayllu (Inka Ruqap panacan), the royal house of Inka Ruqa, related to Chinchaysuyu.
- Awqaylli Panaca (Yawar Waqaqpa panacan), the royal house of Yawar Waqaq, related to Antisuyu.
- Suqsu Panaca Ayllu (Wiraqucha Inkap panacan), the royal house of Wiraqucha Inka, related to Antisuyu.
- Hatun Ayllu (Pachakutiq Yupankip panacan), the royal house of Pachakutiq Yupanki, related to Chinchaysuyu.
- Qhapaq Ayllu (Tupaq Yupankip panacan), the royal house of Tupaq Yupanki, related to Chinchaysuyu.
- Tumipampa Ayllu (Wayna Qhapaqpa panacan), the royal house of Wayna Qhapaq (not mentioned by Molina)

In addition to the recorded panacas, the chronicles sporadically mention other panacas that possibly played an important role in earlier times and that were overwhelmed by groups with more importance. From Hanan Cusco two panacas were excluded from the official list and from Hurin Cusco three. Huascar and Atahualpa did not found a panaka during their short reigns.

== Origin of the word panaka ==
Luis E. Valcárcel postulated that pana-kak could be read as pana ka-q «the one who is sister». Subsequent scholars investigated the matrilineal nature of the panakas, given the feminine characteristics of the term pana (sister) so that each person (male and female) would belong to their sister's or mother's group. In Quechua there are two terms that correspond to the meaning of "sister": pana and ñaña: the man calls his sister a pana, while the woman calls hers a ñaña (as the counterpart of sister in Andean dualism, the brother is called wayqe by the other brother and tura by the sister). According to Reiner Tom Zuidema, the original differences between ayllus and panakas was that the ayllus were patrilineal while the panacas maintained a matrilineal system.

María Rostworowski writes that, before the 16th century, ayllu and panaka were synonyms. The characterization of the term panaca to designate the kinship group of the Sapa Inca, would be a post-Conquest introduction induced by the early Spanish historians.

According to Hernández Astete, Qhapaq Ayllu and Hatun Ayllu may have never existed as established panakas. According to this historian, Qhapaq Ayllu was the generic name of the high nobility, while Hatun Ayllu would correspond to the descendants of the nobles of non-Inca women who, in order to access power in Cusco, established kinship ties with the Incas.

Hernández Astete puts writes that the word panaka is associated only with noble women with whom they are "panas", since they had kinship ties with some of the earlier Incas, then only those men and women who descended from a "pana" constituted the Inca nobility. The men of the group, including the Inca, also had children with women who were not part of the highest nobility of Cuzco. Thus, a man could be part of the "royal lineage" –the nobility– only if he was the son of a "pana", thus the "pana" granted noble status to their direct descendants since, as far as it is known, polygamy was a male prerogative. For their part, all the women of the elite, even daughters of noble parents, called themselves "panas" and constituted kinship groups associated with each of the sectors of power in Cuzco. The ayllus formed by these groups of women would be what historians have called "panacas". This interpretation of a panaca as a group of sisters of the Inca would mean that the panaca preceded the ruler and that the ruling Inca was chosen from among them.

A study carried out by Donato Amado, historian from the Pontifical Catholic University of Peru, refers to documents issued by the Real Audiencia (Royal Court), preserved in the Archivo Regional de Cusco (Cusco regional Archive) which include records of purchase and sale of land, reports of inspections by the Spanish authorities, lawsuits, demarcation and land marking in the 16th and 17th century. They somehow contrast with the information from the Chroniclers of the same period in that the owners of the Hanan lands were male descendants of the Sapa Inca, while owners of the Hurin lands were female descendants. It appears from property litigations and the court rulings settling them, that there is a demarcation between the lands owned by the panacas and the lands owned by the ayllus in the Cusco valley: they are not mixed but clearly divided in two parts: the Hanan (higher) or north part of the lands are property of ayllus while the hurin (lower) or south are property of panacas. Moreover the owner of the Hanan lands were all men, while the owner of the Hurin lands were all women. The latter statement is also supported by a sentence by Inca Garcilaso de la Vega who wrote: «[when] our imperial city began to be populated, it was divided into two halves … The King wanted those he summoned to populate Hanan Cozco, and for this they call it the high one, and those that the Queen summoned [were] to populate Hurin Cozco, and for this reason they called it the low one. This division of the city was not so that such as the one half would gain an advantage over the other half in exemptions and pre-eminences, but that all were equal as brothers, children of a father and a mother». In practice, those who were part of the kinship of a male line lived in the hanan Cusco sector, while the family bond established by the coya, the Inca's wife, lived in the hurin Cusco sector.

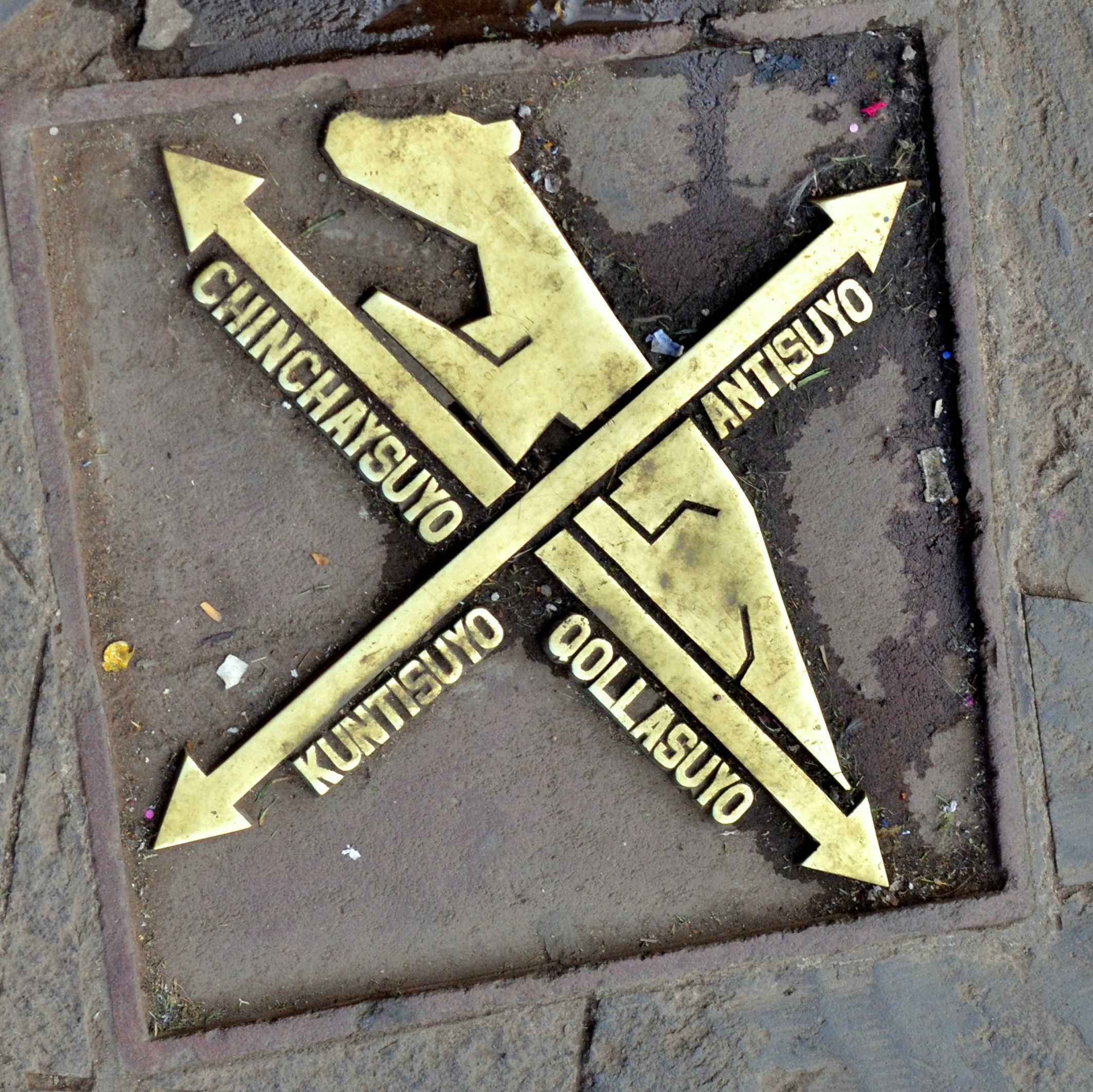
Plaque in Cusco indicating the directions of the 4 regions (suyus) of the Inca Empire. Note that north is towards the top of this image

Cusco was the center point of the empire (the navel as Inca Garcilaso states.) and the four suyus –provinces– stemmed from it. As a result the study confirms that male children of the ruling Inca formed Hanan Cusco, whose lands extended over the Chinchaysuyu and Antisuyu parts, mostly north of Cusco) while the daughters together with the qoya (inca main wife) made up the panaca and were from Hurin Cusco, which is why they occupied the sector of Qullasuyu and Kuntisuyu, mostly south of Cusco. For these reasons, according to Amado, the kinships of Hanan Cusco were identified as royal ayllus, while those of Hurin Cusco were called panaca or better panaca ayllu. This supports the assumption that ayllu and panaca were not synonyms.

Finally the Peruvian linguist Rodolfo Cerrón Palomino who contributed to the investigations on the Quechua languages proposes a new interpretation of the word panaca, suggesting its origin from the Puquina language. He states that research «carried out on the basis of the respective philological examination, shows that the word cannot be affiliated with either Quechua or Aymara, but rather with Puquina, a language in which the verb paña- meant 'to come down, descend'».

On the contrary the philologist and linguist César Itier suggests a new etymology for the word "panaca" basing on some early colonial writings, particularly those by José de Acosta (16th century Spanish Jesuit missionary and naturalist) and Juan Pérez Bocanegra (author in 1631 of a booklet for the religious teaching to the Inca people). He states that they both of them translate the term panaca as "vicar", "governor", "lieutenant" and "pontiff". Thus meaning that the interpretation given by the early chroniclers was wrong: the word "panaca" did not mean a royal clan (royal ayllu) but was used by the quechua speaking locals to let the chroniclers know that some vicar was in charge of representing the royal clan. According to Itier the royal ayllus were never called panacas.

== See also ==
- Ayllu
- Situa
- Inca Emperors
- Inca Government
