= Situa =

Health and purification festival in the Inca Empire

The situa or citua (in Quechua situwa raymi) was the health and ritual purification festival in the Inca Empire. It was held in Cusco, the capital of the empire, during the month of September on the day of the first moon after the spring equinox, which in the southern hemisphere takes place normally on September 23. It was a very important festival whose rites are well described by the early Spanish chroniclers, in particular Cristóbal de Molina, Polo de Ondegardo and Inca Garcilaso de la Vega. The latter witnessed situas as a child after the Spaniards had reduced them to memorials of the actual Inca festival. The situa is also mentioned by Bernabé Cobo, who copied, most probably, its text from Molina, Felipe Guaman Poma de Ayala, Pedro Sarmiento de Gamboa and Juan de Betanzos.

== Background ==
The festival was held when the rain season had just begun and many illnesses tended to occur. Rituals to the Creator-god were thus executed both in Cusco and in other lands conquered by the Incas in order to purify them and "send the evil away".

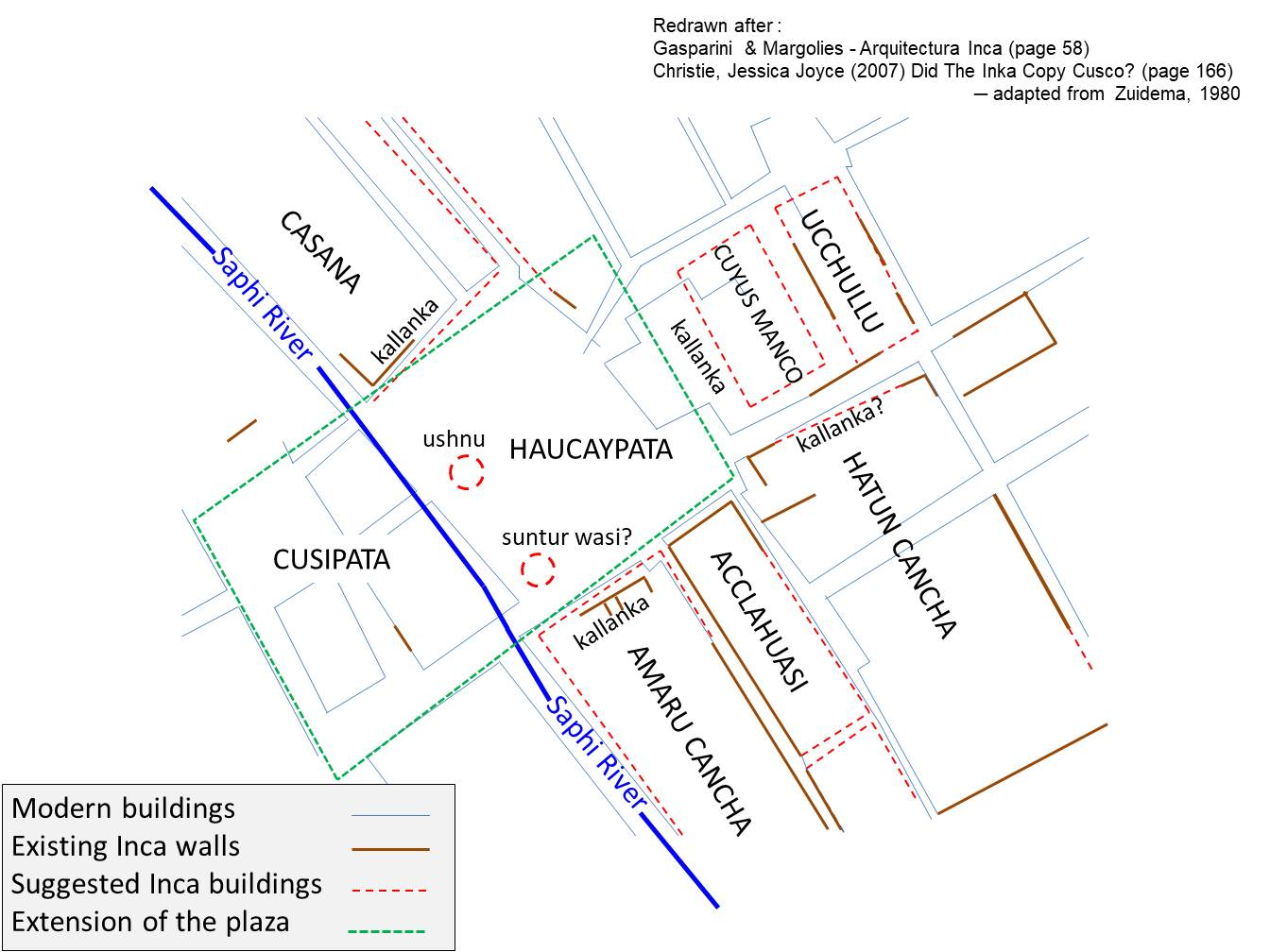
Cusco center at Inca time. Note that the plaza was much larger than today

The four days rites included offerings "rams" (that is llamas and alpacas), carefully chosen for their white color, to the deities, purification by bathing in the river water, lighting large straw torches (like large balls, called panconcos) and preparing and eating the ritual maize buns called sanco (sankhu in Quechua) whose dough was often mixed with blood. All were allowed to drink chicha (fermented beverage, corn beer) during the four days festival «without stopping». A great number of persons and beasts gathered in the main plaza of Cusco (Haucaypata), which in Inca times was much larger than the current Plaza de Armas. Figures of the deities from the huacas (shrines) were carried to their respective temples they had in Cusco.

To obtain proper cleanliness of the city, all foreigners and those with physical defects were banished from the city for a distance of two leagues.

According to Molina, Pachacuti Inca was the sovereign who defined the way the festival had to be performed, giving rules to an ancient tradition.

== Description of the situa ==
“Illnesses, disasters, misfortunes, and dangers, leave this land!” – ritual cry of the situa festival

— Cristóbal de Molina, Account of the Fables and Rites of the Incas, end of 16th century

=== Preparation ===
According to Garcilaso, the priests could detect the equinox by observing the shadows of stone columns as projected though an east to west line and could discern the exact date of the situa.

In order to obtain proper cleanliness of the city, all those who were not natives of Cusco were banished for a distance of two leagues. Moreover, anyone who had broken earlobes, all the hunchbacks and anyone who had a lesion or defect on their body were taken out of city, being considered as carriers of bad fate. Even the dogs were chased out of the city so that they would not howl. They could all return to the city at the beginning of the last day of the festival.

In the meantime, the population of Cusco prepared for this festival with fast and abstinence for three days. Children fasted just one day. On the night before the start of the festival, men, women and children gathered at the house of the eldest brother of the family and prepared the bread called sanco, made with corn flour and other previously toasted cereals, cooked with little water and some fat. This bread, prepared in buns the size of a small apple, was used in ceremonies as sacred food and it was left half cooked. A variety of Sanco was additionally prepared with blood in the dough (in Quechua yawar sankhu, where yawar means blood), which Garcilaso affirms was taken from children between five and ten, by bloodletting through a cut in the middle of the eyebrows,. The two kinds of sanco were cooked separately. Polo de Ondegardo reveals that the blood was in fact taken from sacrificed beasts. He also reports that the acllas, Virgins of the Sun, prepared a great amount of buns, which were also given to the foreigners in the last day of the festival, while even more buns were sent to the distant shrines and to the kurakas (local chiefs and governors) as a sign of confederation and loyalty to the Sun-god and the Inca. Sanco was also used to warm people, statues and mummies, rubbing it on the bodies so as to revitalize them. The chroniclers use the Spanish word calentar for this action.

Before dawn, everyone washed their bodies and took a little of the blood sanco and passed it over their heads and faces, chests and backs, arms and legs in order to cleanse their bodies of all diseases. The elder brother, lord of the house, smeared the threshold of the street door with sanco and left it glued to them, as a sign that the lavatory had been done and all the persons were cleansed.

The situa lasted four day as follows:

- the first day was dedicated to ritual bathing and purification by eating sanco;
- the second day was dedicated to the deities: Creator, Sun, and Thunder, with sacrifices for them and saying prayers for the Inca;
- the third day was for the Moon and the Earth, and sacrifices and prayers were performed to them;
- the next day all the nations subjected to the Inca entered the plaza with their huacas, dressed in the finest clothing of their lands, bringing a large amount of livestock.

=== Day 1 ===
On the day of the conjunction of the Moon, at noon, the Inca went to the Coricancha (Quechua Qorikancha), the temple of the Sun-god, with his council, the priests and the most noble persons of Cusco. There they discussed the details of the festival, because in some years certain aspects could be added or removed. In the meantime, many armed warriors met in the small square in front of the temple, while the statues of the deities from some huacas were brought to that same square. The high priest of the Sun would then declare the festival opened.

In the middle of the main plaza of Cusco there was a special ushnu (a ceremonial platform) which was shaped as a golden pillar and resembled a well. It was filled with chicha poured on top of it as a sacrifice, which everyone could drink.

Four hundred runner warriors, fully armed, were assembled and waiting around the ushnu; each group of one hundred was facing one of the four suyus (provinces of the Inca Empire): Chinchaysuyu (NW), Antisuyu (NE), Kuntisuyu (SW) and Qullasuyu (SE). When the priests form the Coricancha arrived, the four hundred warriors shouted a ritual cry and started running towards the four directions of the Inca empire. The runners, continuously shouting the ritual words, carried their weapons; after a quarter of a league they passed them to other warriors and so on until they were about "five or six leagues out of the city. There the runners bathed and washed their weapons in the rivers at the places they had reached. The warriors going to Collasuyu bathed in the Urubamba River (also known as Vilcanota) near the modern town of Quiquijana, those going to Chinchaysuyu bathed in the Apurímac River below the modern town of Limatambo. Those who carried their shouts to Antisuyu bathed in the Urubamba River beside the modern town of Písac and those who went to Cuntisuyu washed at the Cusibamba River.

Molina states that: «the reason that they bathed in these rivers was because these are voluminous rivers [that] they know lead to the sea, and so [the rivers] would carry the illnesses [away]». While the warriors passed along the ceques, the sacred paths radiating from Cusco joining the huacas, people stood out of their houses shaking their clothes and blankets while shouting for the illnesses to leave the city and asking for a prosperous year.

Bauer points out that «during Inca times, the ritualized cleansing of evil ended with the four relays of warriors bathing themselves and their weapons in the major rivers of the region. In the later and more limited rituals witnessed by Garcilaso de la Vega, the situa festival ended with the runners sticking their spears “in the ground as a barrier to prevent the ills from re-entering the area from which they had been banished"». Moreover Garcialso states that a royal blood Inca, not necessarily the Sapan Inca, fully dressed and with a spear, run down from the Sacsayhuamán fortress to the Haucaypata, where four royal blood Incas (and not four hundred warriors) awaited and then run towards the four suyus. When the night came everybody danced, including the Inca.

=== Day 2 ===
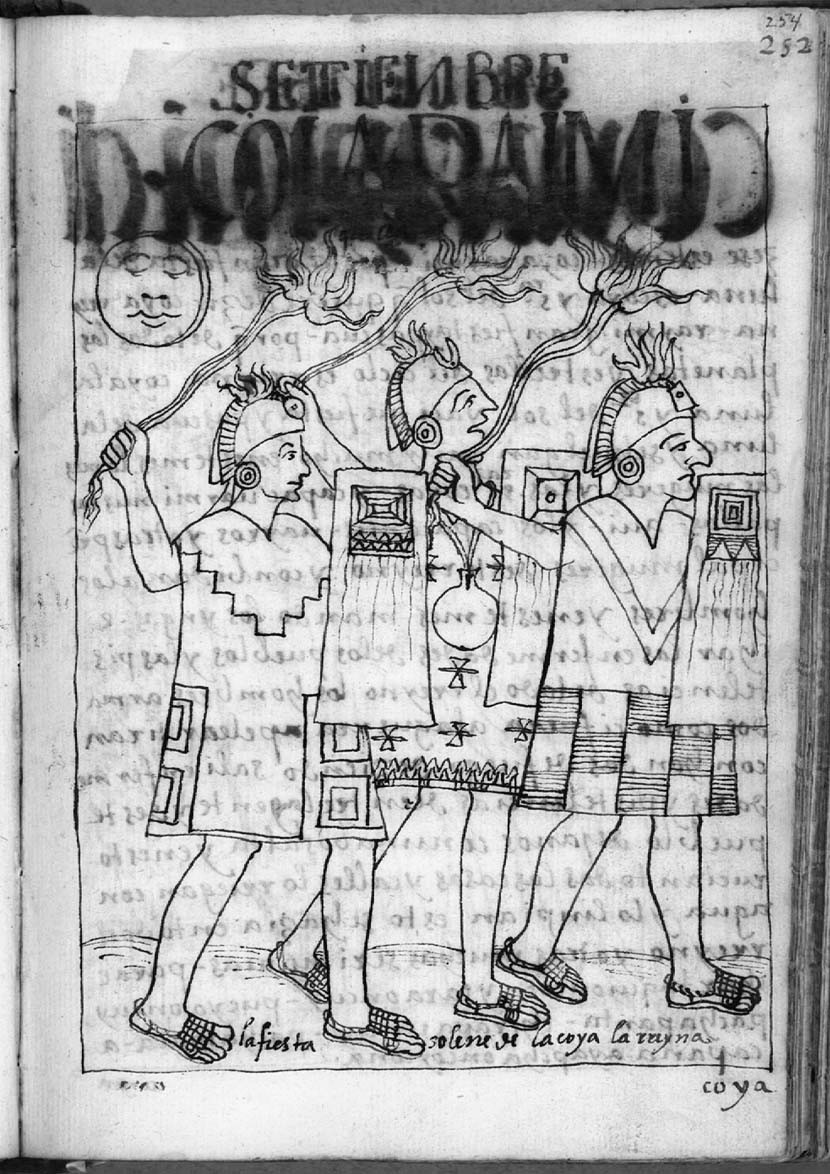
During the situa festival straw torches were lit and carried around to remove the evils by night

At dawn, people went to the rivers and springs to bathe, and ordered any illness to leave them. After bathing, they prepared and lit large straw torches, similar to large balls tied with ropes, called pancuncos or panconcos (pankunku in Quechua, meaning dry wood or straw torch). The men went around playing and hitting each other with them. These torches interested the Spanish chroniclers and they gave different descriptions of the practice. Polo de Ondegardo states «[…] they emitted great shouts, with torches in their hands, crying “Evil be driven out,” and hitting one another with the torches. These were called panconcos.» Garcilaso de la Vega states «[…] they went out with great torches of straw woven like the jackets for oil jars in round balls. These were called pancuncu, and took a long time to burn. Each was fastened to a cord a fathom in length, and they used to run through all the streets trailing the torches till they were outside the city, as if the torches removed the evils by night as the spears did by day. The burned torches were finally cast into the streams that pass through the city, together with the water in which the people had washed the previous day, so that the running water might carry the ills they had driven out of their houses and out of the city down to the sea.» Felipe Guamán Poma de Ayala, who describes the situa in his manuscript El primer nueva corónica y buen gobierno (First New Chronicle and Good Government), states «Men armed as if they were going to fight a war, throwing fire slings, saying in a loud voice: "Leave sicknesses and pestilences from the people and from this town! Leave us!"» Guamán provides a picture of the pancuncus.

After this, the men returned to their houses, to end the day eating sanco, which they also put on their faces and in places where they kept their food and clothes. They also threw sanco into the springs, wishing not to be ill and any illness to be kept out of their houses. Sanco was also given to the other members of the family and friends. The mummies of the dead relatives were warmed with sanco, so that they could enjoy the celebration. The day ended in joy, and everyone ate and drank the best foods they had; even the poorest persons had saved food for the festival.

During this celebration no one argued with one another, nor pronounced angry words, nor asked to be repaid a debt because they believed that if they had behaved badly in this day, they would have quarrels and difficulties all year long. That night the statues of the Creator the Sun and the Thunder, were taken out of their respective temples and the priests warmed them with sanco.

=== Day 3 ===
On the next morning the priests brought fine foods to be presented to the statues of the Creator, the Sun, and the Thunder in their respective temples. The priests of the huacas received this food and burned it as a sacrifice to the deities. As in other cultures, the Incas mummified their dead sovereigns, the Sapan Inca and his Qoya (queen) and worshipped them after the death. Mummies were taken care of by the panaka (lineage) of the dead emperor and shown in public at festivals. Thus the third day of situa each panaka took out and brought to the main square the royal mummies they were taking care of and at night they ritually washed them in the same baths that each sovereign had been using while alive. Once the mummies were taken back to their respective homes they were warmed with sanco and then each mummy was offered the food they liked most in their life, which after this rite was burnt as an offering to the deities.

When the Sapan Inca finished his own bath he went to his private room with his principal wife where both were warmed with sanco on their heads, which were then adorned with the iridescent plumes of a bird. The same ritual was performed on the statue of the Creator-god. Afterward the Inca, fully dressed in his richest robes and accompanied by his court, went to the main plaza of Cusco. At the same time, the main image of the Sun-god, accompanied by the priests of the Sun, was brought to the plaza together with two other gold images representing its wives.

=== Day 4 ===
During this last day, all those who were driven out of the city at the beginning of the festival were summoned inside once again to join the celebration. Everyone went again to the plaza with the priests, the huacas and the Inca. A great amount of livestock, of all types and from each of the four regions, was brought to the plaza too. Molina states that «according to those who gave statements … there were over one hundred thousand heads. This livestock had to be clean, without any blemishes or marks, and woolly, having never been shorn».

The high priest of the Sun choose four among the cleanest and whitest rams, rubbing them with blood sanco and sacrificed them. The high priest then warned everyone that those who dare eating sanco in sin will be punished by the gods, while those who ate sanco in pure spirit will be rewarded by «joyful years, bountiful food, and everything else needed for success». The high priest ate his portion of sanco followed by the nobility from the two Cusco neighborhoods, hanan and hurin (upper and lower), saving some for those who were absent. The lungs of the sacrificed rams were taken out and inflated by blowing into them. The priests then looked for any signs that implied either fruitful or bad incoming years. Then the lungs were burnt and the meat of the four rams was eaten by the priests, while all the other people were invited to share the remaining rams sacrificed and cooked on the square. A great amount of chicha, prepared in due time from white maize for the purpose of the festival, was brought to the plaza and drank.

Meantime the priests carried their huacas to the plaza on litters, while the nobility joined their two groups in one to make room for them. The local chiefs were then rubbed with sanco and they recited a joint prayer, after which they ate the rams meat.

All the nations danced the situwa taki, the special song for the situa festival. Then the representatives of the nations asked permission to return to their respective lands and were given a reward by the Inca for having participated to the festival.

=== Prayers ===
Molina reports several prayers recited during the situa both in Quechua and with a translation in Spanish. They are an important witness of the ancient Inca rites.

A well known prayer, whose text is also provided by Guaman Poma de Ayala, Martín de Murúa and Juan de Santa Cruz Pachacuti Yamqui Salcamaygua is the following:

O Creator! [You] who are without equal to the end of the world. [You] who gave life and strength to mankind, and said, "[Let] this one be male,” and to the women, “[Let] this one be female.” Saying this, you created them, shaped them, and gave them life. Protect those that you have created, [let them] live safe and sound, without danger, [and] in peace. Where are you? Are you in the heights of heaven? Or below in the thunder [clouds]? Or in the storm clouds? Hear me, answer me, and grant me [my prayers]; give us eternal life forever. Take us by your hand and receive this offering wherever you may be, O Creator!

— Cristóbal de Molina, Account of the Fables and Rites of the Incas, end of 16th century

=== Later remnants ===
When the Spaniards conquered the Empire and imposed the Christian religion as the only one, they started a fight against idolatry, forbidding all Inca festivals and ritual practices to take place. Even the situa, among the most important, was suppressed. It became a sort of folkloric memorial rather than a religious feast. Polo de Ondegardo states in 1559 that the bathing, the drunkenness and some trace of the situa still lasted four days with somewhat differentiated ceremonies, and with a lot of secrecy. Garcilaso confirms in 1609 that the celebration was still practiced, in a reduced form as compared with the festivals of the 1540s and 1550s. While he was a young boy he was an eyewitness to part of the rituals since, as a child, he was not allowed to see all of it. He writes: «I remember having seen part of this celebration in my childhood. […] I saw the four Indians running with their spears. I saw the common people shaking their clothes and making the other gestures, and saw them eat the bread called sanco. I saw the torches or pancunu [sic], but did not see the nocturnal rite, because it was very late and I had already gone to bed».

== See also ==
- Inti Raymi
- Coricancha
- Inca Empire
- Ceque system
