= Polo de Ondegardo =

Spanish colonial jurist, civil servant and thinker (d. 1575)

Polo Ondegardo (c. 1520 in Valladolid – 1575 in Ciudad Rica de La Plata) was a Spanish colonial jurist, civil servant, businessman and thinker who proposed an intellectual and political vision of profound influence in the earliest troubled stage of the contact between the Hispanic and the American Indigenous world. He was born in Valladolid, when the city was the capital of the kingdom of Castile, to a prominent noble family that had strong ties to the royal family. He spent his entire adult life in South America in what is now Peru and Bolivia. He was involved in the political and economic management of the Spanish colony and based on his good knowledge of the laws as licenciado (licentiate) acquired a deep knowledge and practical experience of the Native Americans in the southern Andes, being an encomendero, visitador (inspector general) and corregidor (district governor and judicial official) in the provinces of Charcas (today Bolivia) and Cusco. His administrative reports, well known and appreciated by his peers and contemporaries, have had wide repercussions in the field of Andean studies up to the present time.

== Biography ==
=== Family and early life ===
Some sources include the name Juan (John) in his Christian name, but according to recent researches his name was solely Polo: he never used the name Juan and always signed his manuscript works as el licenciado Polo (the licentiate Polo).

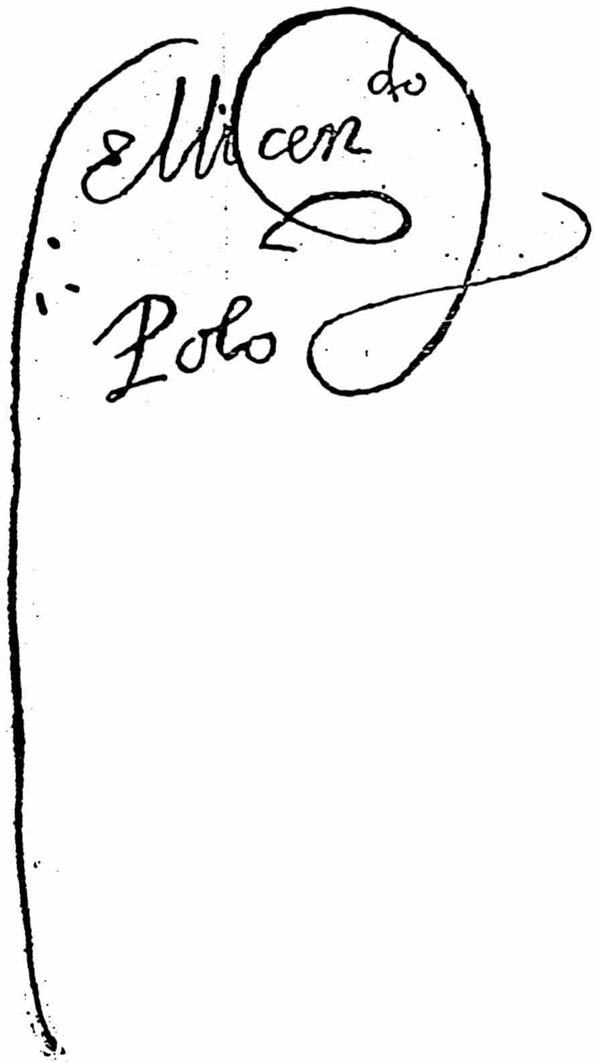
Signature of the licenciado Polo de Ondegardo.

There are no documentary elements that provide the date of the birth of Polo Ondegardo in the city of Valladolid, nor the years of his study at the University of Salamanca. From a testimonial statement made in March 1550, in which he stated that he was then over 30 years old, it can be inferred that he might be born around 1520 or perhaps some years earlier.

He was the eldest of the seven children of Diego López de León Ondegardo and Jerónima de Zárate. His father, hidalgo (nobleman) of Valladolid with Milanese ancestors, was receptor (receiver, administrator) of the Inquisition of Granada, that is the person who managed the incomes, taxes and other goods of any kind of the Inquisition. The López de León Ondegardo family was for sure an important one since the receptor was appointed directly by the king and acted on behalf of the crown, who was responsible for disposing of the confiscated assets of condemned persons. His mother was the daughter of Lope Diaz de Zárate a court official who served as a chamber clerk (secretary) both in the Supreme Council of the Inquisition and in the Council of Castile, the highest administrative and judicial body of the Spanish monarchy at that time. Polo's uncle (his mother's brother) was Agustin de Zárate, fiscal auditor and general accountant of the Viceroyalty of Peru and Province of Tierra Firme and later chronicler.

Polo's father died in 1534 while he was studying in Valladolid for his bachelorship of law which he obtained in 1538. The Zárate family took direct charge of the education of the seven Ondegardo siblings with a financial aid of 7,000 maravedís by their grandfather and when he died in 1538 his property was partitioned between his children Agustin and Jerónima (Polo's mother).They both received the amount of 564,525 maravedís, distributed in household furniture, silver objects and income titles in the jurisdiction of Valladolid and nearby country. Through the same will Polo received a special grant of 90 ducats to complete his studies at the University of Salamanca. Unfortunately Polo's name does not appear in registers of the university which at the time were incomplete.

In Salamanca, Polo most probably attended the lessons of Francisco de Vitoria, founder of the philosophy of human rights known as School of Salamanca, which supported the just titles of Castile and the legitimacy of the war against the Native Americans, called Indians at that time, but defending the rights of the natives to be free from foreign dominion, to the possession of their goods and territories and to govern themselves. In fact Polo's subsequent political position identified with the "intermediate" conception of the School of Salamanca, which distanced itself from the extreme positions either in favor of the Native Americans or the Spaniards. He defended the recognition of indigenous people as human beings, the preservation of their culture and traditional customs, and at the same time the promotion of evangelization by showing an attitude in favor of humanitarian principles but also in favor of the economic and political interests of the king.

=== Peru civil war ===
In 1543, having already obtained the title of licentiate, Polo joined his uncle Agustín de Zárate, appointed general accountant of Peru and Tierra Firme, and embarked for South America, in the huge (52 ships) fleet of Blasco Núñez Vela, the newly appointed first viceroy. Núñez was charged with the task of enforcing the New Laws aimed at removing most of the power from the conquistadors and returning it to the king. Polo traveled in the same galleon as his brother Diego de Zárate, the judges of the new Real Audiencia (Royal Tribunal) to be set up in Lima and the newly appointed governor of Nicaragua Rodrigo de Contreras (whose daughter Polo would later marry). On that ship traveled also Diego Martín, cleric and Hernando Pizarro's butler, who was charged of the interests of his lord in Peru and who carried out propaganda action spreading a negative image of the viceroy. Through Diego Martín, Polo became administrator of all of Hernando Pizarro's wealths. After a stop in Panama, Polo arrived in Lima in June 1544, along with this uncle Agustín de Zárate and the other members of his entourage. A couple of months later the uprising of the Peruvian encomenderos started against the royal authority, which led to the acceptance of Gonzalo Pizarro as governor in Lima and the deposition of the viceroy Núñez Vela by the Real Audiencia. In 1545 Polo was acting lawyer for the Royal Treasury in the accounting mission carried out by his uncle Zárate who, at the end of it, left for Spain, while Polo and the other members of his entourage remained in Peru, involved in the rebellion of the encomenderos.

Polo moved to the city of Cuzco, where he publicly supported the Pizarro side and in 1547 was forced by the field master Francisco de Carvajal, the Demon of the Andes, to return to Lima and take charge in favor of the pizarristas. In the meantime the king had named Pedro de la Gasca president of the Audiencia and acting viceroy in an attempt to try a peaceful settlement of the dispute. As soon as Polo was aware of this appointment, he changed his mind and joined the royalist troops in the Jauja Valley. On request of Agustín de Zárate he wrote the Relación de las cosas acaescidas en las alteraciones del Perú después que Blasco Núñez Vela entró en él (Report of the things that happened in the alterations of Peru after Blasco Núñez Vela entered it). In April 1548, at the Battle of Jaquijahuana in today Pampa de Anta, 25 kilometres (16 mi) from Cusco, Pizarro's forces were defeated by Gasca's army. Pizarro and Carvajal were executed, while most of the pizarristas were pardoned. Polo was dispatched to Charcas (today Bolivia) as investigating judge of those involved in the rebellion. He was also appointed as judge of residence of the public officials of Charcas and received as a grant by Gasca an encomienda of Natives in Cochabamba.

=== Polo as encomendero in Charcas ===
While in Charcas he was charged by the local Audiencia with the task of understanding the work of indigenous workers in the silver mines in Potosí. To fulfill his task he carried out a survey with the kurakas (local indigenous governors) and indigenous workers of the Potosí mines. In order to collect the precious data he included in his manuscripts, Polo was probably the first person to carry out inquiries with interviews to people, in what has now become a well-known anthropological technique. His inquiries were programmed with scientific meticulousness, because, in addition to asking the Natives he included the data retrieved form quipus and the other few Inca graphic documents. At the end of his task Polo was also capable of sending more than 3,700 silver bars to the Royal Treasury.

Polo never forgot the support of the Zárate family to his studies at the University of Salamanca. There is a letter Polo wrote in 1550 from Potosí in which he states having instituted an income for the endowment of Isabelica, daughter of his uncle Agustín de Zárate.

At the beginning of 1550 he left his office of judge in Charcas and moved to Lima becoming an advisor on government business to the newly established archbishop Jerónimo de Loayza. Thanks to his good offices Polo received from Loayza a land extension to his encomienda in Charcas and in 1552 he eventually settled in Ciudad Rica de La Plata (today Sucre), capital of the region.

In the war against the rebel Francisco Hernández Girón, Polo, despite being a lawyer, fought as a royalist infantry captain at the Battle of Chuquinga and was seriously wounded by a harquebus to the leg in the battle of Pucara on October 8, 1554, where Girón was defeated, imprisoned and later executed.

=== Corrregidor in Cusco ===
Polo became a very wealthy person. A document records a transaction carried out by Polo in favor of his mother in Spain: he deposited 14,000 pesos in silver at the Royal Teasury in Peru which was exchanged for his mother with juros (perpetual property right) at the Casa de la Contratación (royal office for indies) in Seville (September 20, 1556). In 1557 he received an income of 10,000 ducats from the viceroyalty of Peru, for his office as attorney.

In 1558 Polo received from the viceroy Marquis of Cañete the appointment of corregidor (district governor and judicial official) of the province of Cuzco and took possession of this office at the end of the year.

In Cusco he carried out a deep inquiry on the religious practices of the natives, which led to his Tratado y averiguación sobre los errores y supersticiones de los indios (Treaty and inquiry into the errors and superstitions of the Indians). He investigated in detail the religion and society of the Andean communities and found out the location of the huacas (shrines) along the ceque system in the four suyus (regions) of the former Inca Empire.

From the chroniclers either contemporary of Polo (Pedro Sarmiento de Gamboa, Cristóbal de Molina) or several years later, (José de Acosta, Antonio de la Calancha, Bernabé Cobo) it is known that he found the embalmed bodies and the representative statues (wawqi statue, brother; called idols by the Spaniards) of several Sapa Incas and some of their wives. This achievement was notable for the church because the Incas mummified their dead rulers and continued to worship them after their death and their presence in the roundabouts of Cusco was a disturbance to the Christianization of the Natives. Polo could achieve the finding through his personal acquaintance with the kurakas (chiefs, indigenous governors) of the royal panakas (kinships of descendants of a Sapa Inca) whose collaboration they offered after the submission pact concluded with the Inca Sayri Túpac, presumed heir to the Inca Empire throne. Polo kept and protected the mummies in his house in Cusco and would later take them to Lima and put them on show, exclusively to Spaniards, in the Hospital de San Andrés. It is Inca Garcilaso de la Vega that in his Comentarios Reales de los Incas (Royal Commentaries of the Incas) describes the surprise he feels when visiting Polo's house and meeting the mummies of his ancestors so well preserved in time. Garcilaso was in fact the natural son of a Spanish conquistador and an Inca noblewoman, direct descendant of the Sapa Inca. The mummies disappeared from the hospital and were never discovered despite archeological investigations in the last 70 years.

Polo carried out also a significant urban work in Cusco: he contracted the construction of the cathedral, new headquarters for the city council, a hospital and shelter for orphan girls and stonework bridges. Finally he regulated the procession of the Feast of Corpus Christi which was (and still is) directly related to the Andean Quyllurit'i festival, that marks the start of the harvest, signaled by the reappearance of the Pleiades after being hidden for a 40 days period.

=== Advisor to the Viceroy in Lima ===
In May 1561 Polo left the charge of Corrregidor in Cusco and went to Lima as an advisor to the viceroy López de Zúñiga. There he wrote for the lawyer Briviesca de Muñatones, one of the commissioners in charge of the encomiendas problem, his Informe sobre la perpetuidad de las encomiendas en el Perú (Report on the perpetuity of the encomiendas in Peru). The question of perpetuity of encomiendas was one of the causes of the uprising of Pizarro in 1544 and was still being debated. In principle the encomiendas should have been assigned to living persons as a reward for their offices, but many encomenderos interpreted their right as hereditary. Polo was a very rich encomendero and in 1562 he obtained an additional distribution of 300 Natives for the cultivation of coca in his encomineda. Nevertheless, his office imposed him to have a better understanding of the matter, so he joined an expedition directed to the southern provinces to consult the local kurakas on the question. On the way, during his stay in Huamanga he dispatched the Ordenanzas de las minas de Huamanga (Ordinances of the Huamanga mines).

Around 1564 Polo married Jerónima de Peñalosa, with whom he had six children. She was a Creole and daughter of Rodrigo Contreras, former governor of Nicaragua who had traveled from Spain to Panama on the same ship with Polo and after accusations of bad government had retired to Lima. At that time and for some years Polo settled in La Plata (Sucre) where he acted as a lawyer for the Audiencia de Charcas.

=== Second term as Corrregidor in Cusco ===
In 1571 Polo wrote the Relación de los fundamentos acerca del notable daño que resulta de no guardar a los indios sus fueros (Account of the basic principles regarding the notable harm that results from not preserving the Indians’ laws for them). He then joined the government team of the viceroy Francisco de Toledo, during his visit to the province of Cuzco, and again assumed the office of corregidor in Cusco.

The king of Spain was worried about the fact that the killing of the last Inca by Pizarro could be interpreted as a violation the European tradition of the divine right of kings, and that this might in turn endanger the legitimate right for the king to rule on the Tawantinsuyu. For this reason he had appointed Francisco de Toledo as viceroy in 1569 and charged him (among other tasks) with producing the proof that the Incas were tyrants, conquered their territories by subjugation of the local people and were not legitimate rulers. In turn the viceroy ordered the contemporary chroniclers Cristobal de Molina and particularly Pedro Sarmiento de Gamboa to provide such proof. Polo knew both and cooperated with them. In January 1572 Sarmiento de Gamboa asked Polo for a testimonial statement in the survey on the history and genealogy of the Incas for Sarmiento's Historia de los Incas (History of the Incas). Sarmiento had his book read in front of the kurakas form the royal panakas and a distinguished group of Spaniards in Cuzco in order to have a formal verification of his history which described the Incas as tyrants. Those present were asked to sign the manuscript.

Polo's second term in the government of the Cusco province, from August 1571 to October 1572, was intense. He completed the reduction of the natives in parishes, supported the incorporation of the yanakunas (servants of the Inca's court) into the Spanish crown, advised on the drafting of ordinances for the government of the city and for the cultivation of coca, and was an active supporter, through supply of food and ammunitions, in the war against the Inca rebel Túpac Amaru who was defeated by the Spanish army in Vilcabamba. After the Inca was executed, Polo quit his office as corregidor and left Cusco together with the Viceory continuing the general visit to the Andean highland provinces. While in La Plata, Polo assumed the office of corregidor of Charcas. In 1574 he wrote his Informe sobre la guerra de los indios Chiriguanos (Report on the war of the Chiriguano Indians).

=== Retirement and death ===
On March 18, 1575, he granted his will in La Plata, leaving his six minor children as heirs and on November 4 he died in the same city. His body was initially buried in the convent of San Francisco in La Plata. In 1592 Polo's remains were transferred and reburied in the Colegio de la Compañía de Jesús in the city of La Plata. Two years later Jerónima, Polo's widow, also died in her residence in La Plata, leaving to their six children a significant wealth.

== Works ==
Polo Ondegardo was a civil servant and only wrote reports and letters, all of which were never published. Nevertheless, they were used by later writers and chroniclers to embed their information in the books they published.

Polo was witness of the most important issues of his time: the knowledge of indigenous customs, the debate on the perpetuity of encomiendas and those on the economy and colonial government, and he carefully reported about them in his writings. In addition to serving as reports and advice to the viceroys and ecclesiastical authorities, they were used as a primary source by various chroniclers, often without even mentioning his name. Polo's text were included in the works of Agustín de Zárate, Hernando de Santillán, José de Acosta, Antonio de la Calancha, Buenaventura Salinas y Córdoba, Bernabé Cobo, Martín de Murúa, Cristóbal de Molina "el cuzqueño", Inca Garcilaso de la Vega, Francisco de Ávila and Pablo Joseph de Arriaga y Herrera.

Polo might have written several reports and letters but just a few of them have been recovered by scholars from the archives in Spain and Peru. His principal works are:

- Tratado y averiguación sobre los errores y supersticiones de los indios [1559 / 1561?] (Treatise and inquiry into the errors and superstitions of the Indians) which deals with the Andean religion and was written at the request of the Archbishop of Lima Jerónimo de Loayza, and used in the second and third Provincial Councils of Lima (1567 and 1582). Its manuscript has been lost. A summary of it was preserved as part of the Confesionario para curas de indios con la instrucción contra ritos y exhortaciones para ayuda a bien morir (Confessional for priests of Indians with instructions against rites and exhortations as a help to well die) written by José de Acosta in 1584. Here the author expresses comments on the laws, the months of the year and related festivals, on sorcery, sacrifices, fortune-tellers, cures and doctors, that allow the scholars to reconstruct the Inca past. The drafting of this treatise, when Polo was Corregidor in Cuzco for his first term, was possible thanks to his widespread political and intellectual network. The treatise was produced at the request of the viceroy Marquis of Cañete and of Jerónimo de Loayza, archbishop of Lima, in 1559. They ordered Polo to find out about the idolatrous practices of the American Natives; in order to achieve this goal he gathered in the square of Cusco the kurakas and indigenous people of the area, summing up four hundred and seventy-five people between men and women, and subjected them to an inquiry. Polo was one of the last chroniclers who based his reports on the data provided by the survivors of the Inca elite, including the khipu kamayuq (quipu manager, quipu responsible) experts in reading the quipus. Polo reported also about human sacrifices of children performed by the Incas. Several years later Polo was harshly criticized by the Jesuit Blas Valera who questioned Polo's knowledge of Quechua and attributed Polo's statement to a misunderstanding of a quechua word: the sacrifices were of young animals and not young humans. Scholars have now confirmed, with archaeological discoveries, the existence of sacrifices of children, mostly in pair (male and female) for special purposes such as protecting against earthquakes or volcanic eruptions. Moreover, the scholars, through the comparison of Polo's works with other linguistics sources, confirmed his good knowledge of quechua and possibly also Aymara languages.
- Relación de los adoratorios de los indios en los cuatro ceques [before 1561] (Report of the shrines of the Indians in the four ceques) which is fully included into Bernabé Cobo's Historia del Nuevo Mundo (History of the New World). Polo produced a list of the huacas that extended along the ceques starting from the Coricancha temple in Cusco towards the four directions of the four provinces of the Tawantinsuyu. Basing on the Polo's treatise, the Cusco ceque system was investigated in detail by R. Tom Zuidema, who confirmed his discoveries and descriptions.
- Informe al licenciado Briviesca de Muñatones sobre la perpetuidad de las encomiendas del Perú [1561] (Report to the licentiate Briviesca de Muñatones on the perpetuity of the encomiendas in Peru) was drawn up according to the questionnaires established in the Royal Decree of 1553. It was requested by the viceroy López de Zúñiga, through the commissioner Briviesca de Muñatones, who was part of the group of commissioners sent by the king to deal with the issue of the perpetuity of the encomiendas in South America.
- Relación del linaje de los incas y cómo extendieron ellos sus conquistas [1561–1570] (Report of the lineage of the Incas and how they extended their conquests). Polo names the Incas in a list that coincides with the one generally recorded by all the chroniclers but unfortunately does not clarify any of the many confusing points of the history of the Incas, nevertheless he refers to a previous report written by him on these issues, which was never retrieved but must have been very rich in data judging by what Polo states.
- Ordenanzas para las minas de Guamanga [1562] (Ordinances of the Huamanga mines). It was requested by the Viceroy and drafted for a mercury mine after a new method for extracting silver using mercury was proposed by a Spaniard.
- Carta para el Doctor Francisco Fernández de Liébana [1565] (Letter to doctor Francisco Fernández de Liébana) was addressed to an official of the vice royal court, Juan Fernández de Liébana, who was living in Charcas and who returned to Spain, where in 1568 he presented the letter to the Junta Magna (major board) which brought together high officials of the king with the objective of reorganizing the entire Spanish-American structure as far as necessary, through very specific and coherent instructions to viceroy Toledo, who would travel to the Indies to implement these provisions. In this letter Polo proposes, on the one hand, a way to prevent the Natives from excessively addressing the courts with pleads, a custom that was born from dealing with the Spaniards, recommending that they keep their customs, and, on the other hand, he presents a series of provisions for the good government of the Natives, expressly indicating obligations to the encomenderos. This letter may have been one of the bases for the initial set up of the legislation for Native Americans which was kept separate from the Spaniard's legislation.
- Verdadero y legítimo dominio de los reyes de España sobre el Perú [1571] (True and legitimate dominion of the kings of Spain over Peru); a work on the presumed tyranny of the Incas, supporting the just titles of the king of Spain to rule in South America.
- Relación de los fundamentos acerca del notable daño que resulta de no guardar a los indios sus fueros [1571] (Account of the basic principles regarding the notable harm that results from not preserving the Indians’ laws for them). It was addressed to Viceroy Francisco de Toledo who used it as a source for his ordinances when Polo was one of his advisers. The report may have been written before Toledo's term. This report is principally a legal and economic treatise which includes valuable economic and ethnographic information for the understanding of indigenous power elites and the emerging colonial society. Moreover, it provides a model of Hispanic-indigenous relationship based on the respect for traditional indigenous local laws (fueros). Nevertheless, this proposal was not taken into account by the different viceroys.
- Informe sobre la guerra de los indios Chiriguanos [1574] (Report on the war of the Chiriguano Indians), written shortly before Polo's death.

=== Pre-Hispanic local taxes and laws ===
The Castile's juridical tradition had familiarized Polo with the coexistence of various legal systems and, most importantly, with their official recognition, such as those related to "other" religions: the Islamic and the Judaic ones, together with the respect for human dignity and cultural tolerance proposed at the Salamanca school by Francisco de Vitoria and his radical follower Bartolomé de las Casas. With such a knowledge Polo tried to understand and describe what he called the fuero (particular law, local legal system) of the southern Andean peoples. In his reports he presented to the Spanish authorities the main rites and beliefs of the Andean communities, the pre-Hispanic tax system, the distribution and use of natural resources and the administrative, economic and political complexity of the Tahuantinsuyu. Polo believed that the best way to control Andean people was to understand their culture. He supported the idea that the old pre-Hispanic law could be used to reduce the litigations, set up a local tax system based on the Incan one and to achieve a more successful colonization. To this end he suggested that the Spaniards' interests, in most cases, lay in preserving Andean institutions as they had found them. Viceroy Toledo did not accept his view and never adopted such a proposal.

=== Quipu ===
Polo was among the first ones to recognize the value of quipus as registers. Polo postulated the idea that the quipus represented a registration system that allowed for an easy incorporation of information, not only numbers. Moreover, the data could be retrieved so easily by a khipu kamayuq (quipu manager, quipu responsible), that Polo stated that the effectiveness of quipu is not only incredible but indeed wonderful. In his writings Polo was astonished by the accuracy of the accounts kept in quipus. His conclusion was that they are instruments of all trust. He checked their accuracy by asking quipu managers to record some data and retrieved them some days later finding that they corresponded to Polo's own records in writing.

== See also ==
- Spanish conquest of the Inca Empire
- Inca Empire
- Ceque system
- Quipu
- Panakas and ayllu
- Agustin de Zárate
- Pedro Sarmiento de Gamboa
- Inca Garcilaso de la Vega
- Francisco Pizarro
- Hernando Pizarro
- Gonzalo Pizarro
- Blasco Núñez Vela
- Francisco de Toledo
