= Cristóbal de Molina =

16th-century Spanish colonial clergy and chronicler

Cristóbal de Molina, called «el Cusqueño» (from Cusco), (Baeza, Spain, circa 1529 - Cusco, 1585) was a Spanish colonial clergyman and chronicler who was very fluent in Quechua. He spent most of his life in Cusco, Peru and became a reputable reporter of the pre-Colonial Andean culture.

He was the author of the manuscript Relación de las fábulas y ritos de los Incas (Account of the fables and rites of the Incas), an invaluable source of information about the Incas and an in-depth report on Andean culture at the time of the Spanish conquest of the Inca Empire.

== Life ==
Nothing is known of Molina's childhood and youth. In his manuscript he states being born in Baeza, Spain, sometime before 1530, but reveals nothing more about his life prior to his arrival in Cusco where he settled in 1556 at the age of about 27. He was nicknamed "el Cusqueño" (the man from Cusco), to distinguish him from another chronicler, Cristóbal de Molina "el Chileno", generally referred to as "el Almagrista" (follower of Diego de Almagro).

Thanks to the years of living with the natives, he learned the Quechua language to the point of handling it with great skill. He was so fluent that the first modern researchers suggested that Molina might have been of mixed European and Andean descent. Subsequent documents showed that this was not the case.

In 1565 Molina was appointed as the priest in the Hospital de Naturales (Hospital for the Natives) of Nuestra Señora de los Remedios (Our Lady of Succor) in Cusco. Later he became preacher general of the Cusco parishes and visitor general in parts of the Cusco bishopric. Interested in the ritual practices of the natives, Molina used to congregate elders and former Inca priests in his parish or in the villages he visited to learn about pre-Hispanic stories and beliefs.

Between 1568 and 1571 Cristóbal de Albornoz, general ecclesiastical visitor in Arequipa, was sent to Huamanga (today Ayacucho) in the Peruvian highlands to identify and destroy idolatry (the shrines of the Natives) and to punish the persons and communities who worshipped them. Because of his knowledge of ritual practices and of the native cultural and religious world, Molina and another Spanish clergy, Olivera, were required to collaborate with Albornoz in his fight against idolatry and against the Taki Unquy messianic movement, which broke out in the central Andes around 1564.

The king of Spain in the 1560s was worried about the fact that the killing of the last Inca by Pizarro could be interpreted as a violation the European tradition of the divine right of kings, and that this might in turn endanger the legitimate right for the king to rule on the Tawantinsuyu. For this reason he had appointed Francisco de Toledo as viceroy in 1569 and charged him (among other tasks) with producing the proof that the Incas were tyrants, conquered their territories by subjugation of the local people and were not legitimate rulers. When in Cusco between 1571 and 1572, Toledo ordered Pedro Sarmiento de Gamboa and, through the bishop, Cristóbal de Molina, to provide such proof. Molina, thanks to his good knowledge of the local language, carried out interviews among the Natives and wrote his work Historia de los incas (History of the Incas) which he finished in March 1572. This manuscript was never retrieved.

On 24 September 1572 the last Sapan Inca, Túpac Amaru, was executed in Cusco, and Molina was one of the priests who accompanied him to the central square where a black-draped scaffold had been erected. There the Inca mounted the scaffold accompanied by the bishop of Cusco, Agustín de la Coruña, to be beheaded.

When in 1573 Sebastián de Lartaun was named bishop of Cusco, Molina provided him with a manuscript titled Relación de guacas y adoratorios del Cuzco (Account of the huacas and shrines of Cusco) about the sacred Inca symbols that were existing in and around the city of Cusco. This work is also lost.

In the following years, probably between 1573 and 1575, Molina was ordered by the bishop to provide an account about the idolatries of the Natives. This work will become the main and only known manuscript by Molina with the title of Relación de las fábulas y ritos de los incas (Account of the Fables and Rites of the Incas). It is known that while in Areqipa, the viceroy Toledo ordered a salary increase for Molina. In his decree he notes that Molina had collected information on the rites and ceremonies of the Incas.

The name of Molina appears again in January 1577 when he testified in Cusco at inquiries about the campaigns against idolatry by Cristóbal de Albornoz. He was simply introduced as a clérigo presbítero (cleric priest), and witnessed that he had known Albornoz for more than ten years and that the latter had successfully completed his service against idolatry in Huamanga (today Ayacucho).

The new archbishop of Lima, soon after being named in 1581, convened a Council of the ecclesiastical province of Lima. Known as the Third Lima Council, it opened on August 15, 1582. All the bishops from Spanish South America were summoned in it, along with notable theologians such as José de Acosta. The task was to settle issues of the church hierarchy and to provide support for the evangelistic activities in all the viceroyalty. The council lasted until 1583. This council was critical for the bishop of Cusco, Lartaun, since several charges had been filed against him from different officials, although he died in Lima on 9 October 1583, before the council ended, so that many of the charges were not resolved. Molina also attended the council. He brought with him a letter signed by the caciques principales (main local chiefs) of Cusco, who were requesting the Viceroy to exempt them from taxes. Most probably some of the caciques, mentioned also by Pedro Sarmiento de Gamboa in his History of the Incas, may have served as informants for both Molina and Sarmiento. Molina's knowledge of Quechua was welcomed by the Council since one of its central tasks was the production of trilingual (Spanish, Quechua, and Aymara) religious works for the teaching of the Christian doctrine. While in Lima, Molina became sick and left before the council ended, and so it is not known how much he helped in the preparation of the documents. In 1584, however, he was summoned again by the council as a witness. This time he is introduced as «the illustrious Cristóbal de Molina, cleric priest, preacher general of the natives of this city, who was also inspector general of this bishopric».

On 29 May 1585 Molina died in Cusco, at a supposed age of fifty-six.

== Works ==
His main work, and the only one preserved, is Relación de las fábulas y ritos de los Incas (Account of the Fables and Rites of the Incas), possibly written between 1575 and 1576, and dedicated to Bishop Sebastián de Lartaun. A copy of the original manuscript was found in Francisco de Ávila's library after his death in 1647. It is now preserved in the Biblioteca Nacional de España (Spain National Library) in Madrid.

It was published for the first time in its English translation by the British scholar Clements R. Markham in 1873. The first edition in Spanish appeared in Chile in 1913 edited by the Chilean historian and paleographer Tomás Thayer Ojeda.

In his clear and direct style Molina cannot hide a certain distance or paternalism towards the Natives. In his work there is also a desire to fuse the classic oral stories of the Andean tradition with biblical writings, trying to blend them with a clearly catechetical purpose.

Molina states at the very beginning of his work, referring to the bishop, that the Account was prepared with the aim to «…understand the origins of their idolatries, because it is true that these [Incas] did not use writing [but], they had in a House of the Sun … next to Cusco, [where] the life of each of the Incas, the lands that [each of them] conquered, and their origin [are] painted with figures on boards …» and, referring to the Bishop Lartaun, in order «that Your Most Reverend Lordship [can] learn about the ceremonies, rituals, and idolatries that these Indians had. To this end, I ordered to assemble a number of very elderly men who witnessed and performed those ceremonies and rituals during [the] time of Huayna Capac, Huáscar Inca and Manco Inca and some leaders and priests who were of those times.»

The Relación includes two main blocks: the first is related to the Inca mythology and legends, such as the creation of man by the Creator-god Viracocha and the flood at the origin of the Incas, while the second deals with the rites of the Inca religion. The latter is the most extensive part of information: it contains data on the periodic festivals of the Natives, particularly the Inti Raymi and Situa and includes also a valuable collections of prayers and songs in Quechua with their translation into Spanish. The description of the Inca festivals are perhaps the greatest of Molina's contributions, because he provides details that are not recounted by other chroniclers. The Relación also includes a report about the magical methods that the Incas used in their healing.

The Peruvian historian and critic Raúl Porras Barrenechea defined Molina the great canonist of the Native American liturgy.

Molina wrote also two other works: Historia de los incas (History of the Incas) and Relación de guacas y adoratorios del Cuzco (Account of the huacas and shrines of Cusco) about the sacred Inca symbols. Neither of the two was ever retrieved.

=== Use of Molina's works ===
Both Miguel Cabello de Balboa and Vasco de Contreras y Valverde, the former in his Miscelánea antártica (Antarctic miscellaneous) and the latter in his Account of the City of Cusco, admit that they used Molina's History of the Incas in writing their works. Moreover, even the Historia Índica (History of the Indies) by Pedro Sarmiento de Gamboa is an account almost identical to the one by Cabello de Balboa so that it could be another version of Molina's History. Bernabé Cobo who finished his Historia general de las Indias (General history of the Indies) in 1653 states that he used Molina's Relación as a basis for his writings.

=== Editions of Relación de las fábulas y ritos de los Incas ===
- 1873 An account of the fables and rites of the Yncas' In Narratives of the Rites and Laws of the Yncas. Translated from the original Spanish manuscripts and edited with notes and an introduction by Clements R. Markham. First series, no. 48: 1–64 - London - Hakluyt Society - Reprinted 1963, 1964, 1969, and 2001.
- 1913 Relacion de las fabulas y ritos de los incas Edited by Tomas Thayer Ojeda - Revista chilena de historia y geografía (Santiago) 3(5): 117–190. The work was, by mistake, attributed by Thayer Ojeda to Cristóbal de Molina el Almagrista
- 1916 Relación de las fábulas y ritos de los incas. Annotations and concordances by Horacio H. Urteaga, biographical and bibliographical information by Carlos A. Romero - Coleccion de Libros y Documentos Referentes a la Historia del Peru, fi rst series, 1: 1–103 - Sanmarti - Lima
- 1943 Fábulas y ritos de los incas. In "Las crónicas de los Molinas". Bio92 bibliographical prologue by Carlos A. Romero, bibliographical epilogue by Rau l Porras Barrenechea, annotations and short commentaries by Francisco A. Loayza. Los Pequenos Grandes Libros de Historia Americana 1(4): 5–84 - Libreria e Imprenta D. Miranda - Lima
- 1947 Ritos y fábulas de los incas. Prologue by Ernesto Morales - Coleccion Eurindia, no. 2 - Editorial Futura - Buenos Aires
- 1989 Relación de las fábulas i ritos de los ingas. In Fábulas y mitos de los incas, edited by Henrique Urbano and Pierre Duviols. Cronicas de America 48: 47–134 - Historia 16 - Madrid
- 2008 Relación de las fábulas y ritos de los incas. Edited, with commentary and notes by Julio Calvo Perez and Henrique Urbano - Universidad de San Martin de Porres Press -Lima.
- 2010 Cristóbal de Molina Relación de las fábulas y ritos de los incas. Critical edition by Paloma Jimenez del Campo - Paleographic transcription by Paloma Cuenca Munoz. editor Esperanza Lopez Parada- Vervuert - Iberoamericana, 2010 - ISBN 978-84-8489-552-7
- 2011 Account of the Fables and Rites of the Incas by Cristóbal de Molina . Edited by Brian S. Bauer; Vania Smith-Oka; Gabriel E. Cantarutti. With an introduction by Brian S. Bauer - University of Texas Press - ISBN 978-0-292-72999-5

== See also ==
- Spanish conquest of the Inca Empire
- Inca Empire
- Francisco de Toledo
- Polo de Ondegardo
