= Pachakutiq =

Pachakutiq (Quechua), Pachakutik (Kichwa) or Pachakuti (Hispanicized spellings Pachacutec, Pachacútec, Pachacuti) may refer to:

- Pachacuti, an Inca emperor
- Pachakutiq (Arequipa-Moquegua), a mountain on the border of the Arequipa Region and the Moquegua Region, Peru
- Pachakutiq (Cusco), a mountain in the Cusco Region, Peru
- Pachakutiq (Moquegua), a mountain in the Moquegua Region, Peru
- Pachakutiq (Puno), a mountain in the Puno Region, Peru

== See also ==
- Pachakutiq (Marvel Cinematic Universe), a character from Agents of S.H.I.E.L.D.
- Pachakuti Indigenous Movement
- Pachakutik Plurinational Unity Movement – New Country
- Carry Somers, for Pachacuti Hat Brand
