= Ch'unchu =

Ch'unchu or Chuncho is a derogatory word used in the Quechua and Aymara languages of Peru for native peoples of the Peruvian Amazon.

The term has been applied to various ethnic groups, including the Asháninka, and the Ese Ejja.
