= Kuraka =

Official of the Inca Empire who held the role of magistrate

A kuraka (Quechua for the principal governor of a province or a communal authority in the Tawantinsuyu), or curaca (Hispanicized spelling), was an official of the Andean civilizations, unified by the Inca Empire in 1438, who held the role of magistrate, on several hierarchical levels, from the Sapa Inca at the head of the Empire to local family units.

The kurakas were the heads of the ayllus (clan-like family units) and of federations of ayllus, called chiefdoms or curacazgos. During the Inca Empire, the Sapa Inca governed with the help of the existing local hierarchies. They served as tax collectors, and held religious authority, in that they mediated between the supernatural sphere and the mortal realm. They were responsible for making sure the spirit world blessed the mortal one with prosperity, and were held accountable should disaster strike, such as a drought. Kurakas enjoyed privileges such as being exempt from taxation, the right to polygamy and to ride in a litter.

The kuraka was an aristocrat who frequently, but not always, descended from the previous generation. Kuraka means 'superior' or 'principal', and his authority was granted by the Inca. Each ayllu and chiefdom had four kurakas: two of them ruled the upper and lower (hanan and hurin) parts, and each of these had an assistant. However, of the four, one kuraka was superior to the rest.

With the conquest of Peru by the Spanish, the Spanish system of rule utilized indigenous leaders as mediators to mobilize labor and tribute from their communities for delivery to Spaniards awarded those benefits in encomienda. The system was implemented first in the Caribbean islands, where such leaders were called caciques, then Mexico, where the Arawak term cacique was extended, and then in the Andean region, where the term kuraka persisted. Indigenous elites maintained their positions so long as they played their assigned role. In the late eighteenth century, the increased taxation of indigenous put pressure on kurakas' allegiances to their own communities and their desire to maintain their status in the colonial order. The 1781 Tupac Amaru rebellion, led by a kuraka, José Gabriel Condorcanqui, known as Tupac Amaru II, was the most serious challenge to the Spanish colonial order in the Andes since the Spanish conquest.

== Magisterial Authority ==
One of the functions of the kurakas was to choose a bride for adult males, aged 25 and over, who could not choose, or had not chosen, a wife. The kurakas could also decide, in the event two men wanted to marry the same woman, which man would be allowed to marry. The kurakas also dealt with minor crimes, but had to refer major crimes to the provincial capital. Among other duties, the kurakas settled disputes, allocated agricultural lands, organized community events, and officiated ceremonies.

== Kurakas in the Spanish colonial era ==
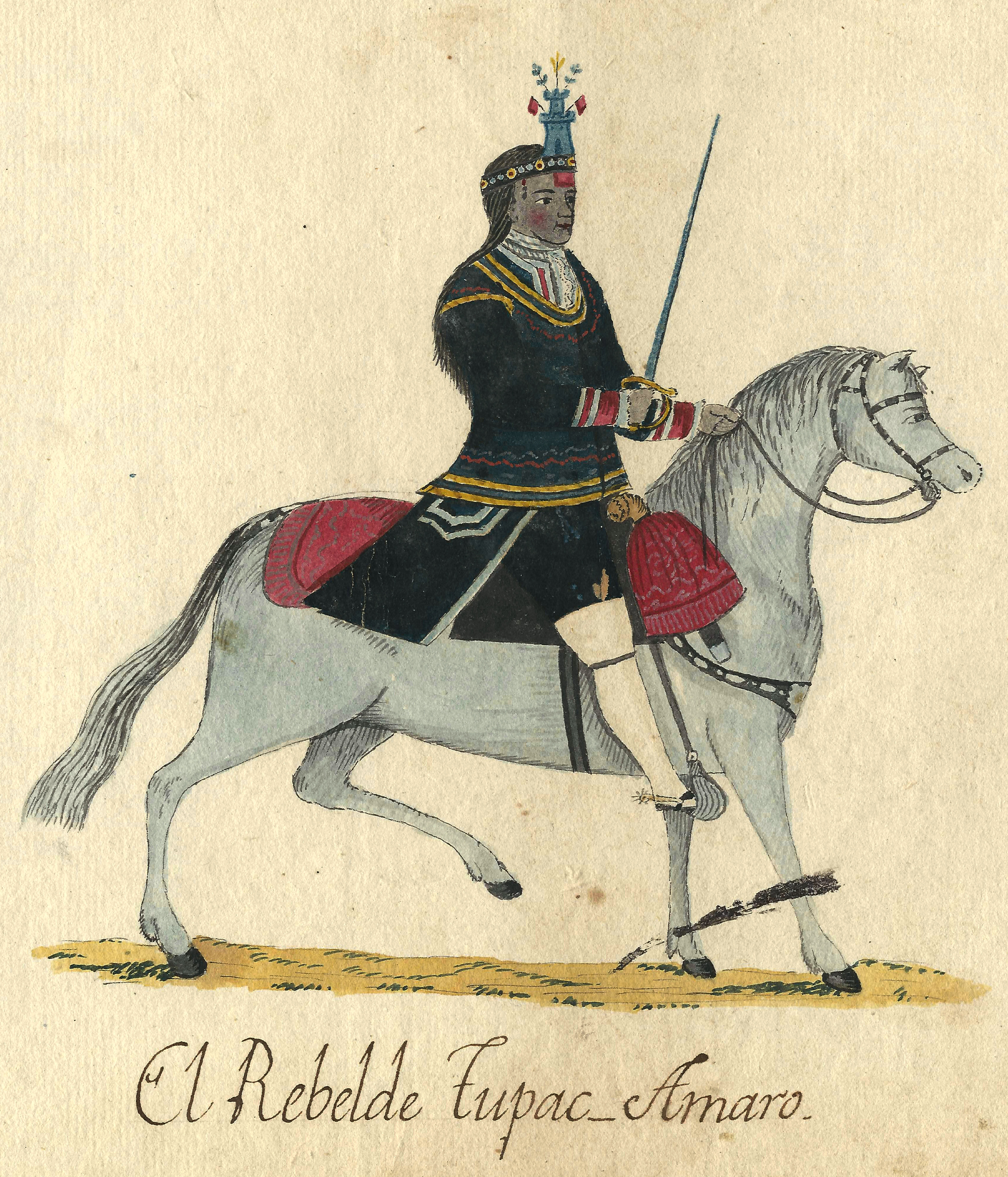
Túpac Amaru II, an Andean kuraka who led a 1781 rebellion against Spanish rule in Peru

The kurakas experienced a transformation during the first years of Spanish conquest of Peru. Since the Inca had not consolidated their rule over many regions, some kurakas were anti-Inca and pro-Spanish. Outside of the former Inca capital of Cuzco, "the regional caciques [kurakas] were the most resolute collaborators with the Spanish Crown." In Peru and elsewhere in Spanish America, the Spanish crown recognized indigenous nobility, so long as they were loyal to the Spanish monarchy. They were exempt from taxation and were granted privileges to ride horses and carry swords. This did not entail a renunciation of their traditional sources of power and prestige. In practical terms, the kurakas collected tribute and mobilized labor, essential to the functioning of the economy under Spanish rule. Some kurakas in the colonial era attempted to strengthen their claims to power and intermarried with the royal Inca descent groups, while at the same time pledging loyalty to the Spanish crown. This situation resulted in their needing to reconcile these two loyalties in the colonial situation.

The role of the kuraka was further transformed in the late colonial era. In the late eighteenth century during the Bourbon reforms, administrative reorganization by the Spanish crown, taxes were increased and greater pressure was put on kurakas as mediators, a key element in the massive, coordinated Andean uprising in 1780-1 known as the Tupac Amaru rebellion. In the period after the Great Rebellion, the crown no longer recognized the kurakas, delegitimizing their lineages and extinguishing them. The traditional elite attire of indigenous nobles was banned, as was music, dance, painting of images of Incas, Inca names, and other cultural manifestations of Inca power and influence. The crown rewarded loyalist kurakas with material rewards, such as money and land, as well as markers of prestige, such as military promotions and titles. However, the power and position of kurakas in general was eroded. At independence in 1825, independence leader Simón Bolívar abolished titles of nobility.

== See also ==
- Cacique
- Spanish Empire
- History of Peru
- Viceroyalty of Peru
