= Antisuyu =

Suyu of the Incan Empire

Coordinates: 13°09′16″S 72°31′31″W

- Suyu of Inca Empire
- 1438–1535
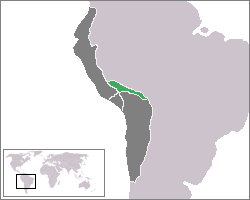
- Antisuyu within the Inca Empire
- Historical era: Pre-Columbian Peru
  - Established: 1438
  - Conquest of Cuzco: 1535
- Subdivisions
  - Type: Wamani
Succeeded by
Viceroyalty of Peru

Antisuyu (Quechua: anti lit. 'east', suyu lit. 'quadrant'; Spanish: Antisuyo) was the eastern part of the Inca Empire which bordered on the modern-day Upper Amazon region which the Anti inhabited. Along with Chinchaysuyu, it was part of the Hanan Suyukuna or "upper quarters" of the empire, constituting half of the Tahuantinsuyu, the "four parts bound together" that comprised the empire.

Antis is a collective term for the many varied ethnic groups living in the Antisuyu such as the Asháninka or the Tsimané.

== Description ==
Wiphala of the Antisuyu

Antisuyu is the second smallest of the suyus. It was located northeast of Cusco in the high Andes. Indeed, it is the root of the word "Andes". 'Anti' is the likely origin of the word 'Andes', Spanish conquerors generalized the term and named all the mountain chain as 'Andes', instead of only the eastern region, as it was the case in Inca era. According to some sources, Antisuyu was not the smallest of the Incan suyus, citing that its territory may have included the eastern slope of the Tahuantinsuyu as well as the adjoining tropical lowlands along the length of the empire.

Antisuyu and Chinchaysuyu were bordered by a line west of the Inca road that ran from Cusco to Tambomachay. The suyu was also separated from Collasuyu by the Huatanay River, which flowed through the city to the eastern end of the valley.

Most of the lowland jungle was not part of Tawantinsuyu. Only the jungle region could not be dominated by the Incas, given that they could not colonize the jungle region. Arguably, the first organized and planned naval action of Peru, was in time of the Sapa Inca Tupac Inca Yupanqui, as it mobilized 10,000 men and their supplies on large rafts navigating the rivers, a task that took two years, After that campaign, he went to the rupa rupa of the Ch'unchus, which was a catastrophe for the Incas, since, according to some authors, only 1,000 soldiers returned alive. After subjugating the Ch'unchus, very few arrived at Musu.

The region of Antisuyu was the final retreat of the Neo-Inca state as they fled Spanish conquest. Notable among the Inca settlements here were Vilcabamba, and Vitcos. It is also thought that the mythical city of Paititi may exist somewhere within this region. Historian Andrew Nicol published research in 2009 in which he concluded that the existence of a city such as Paititi is possible within the Peruvian Amazon Basin. Research as recent as 2016 by Vincent Pélissier provides a possible location for the lost city to the northeast of Vilcabamba.

== Annexation ==
Antisuyu was previously not part of the Incan empire. It was later conquered to address the problem of the shrinking space for crops along the coastal region of the empire.

== Wamani ==
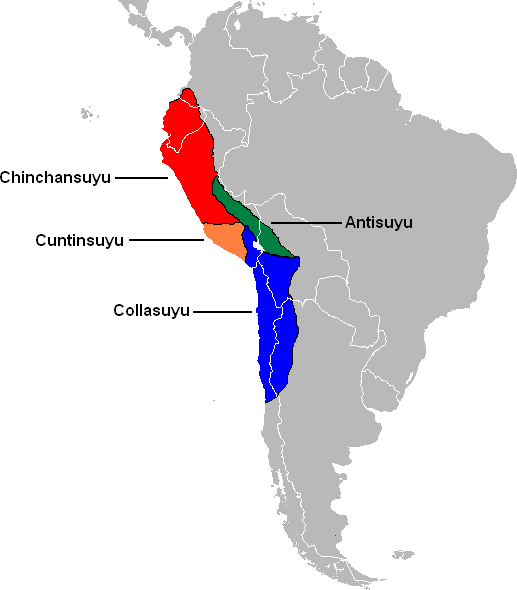
The four suyus of the Inca empire. Antisuyu appears in green.

Each suyu was divided into wamani, or provinces. Antisuyu included the wamani of:

- Campa
- Chunchos
- Cunibo
- Lare or Lari, whose people were “Incas by privilege”
- Machiguenga
- Omasayo or Umasuyu
- Paucartambo or Pawqartampu
- Piro
- Shipibo
- Vilcabamba or Willkapampa

== See also ==
- Amazon rainforest
- Organization of the Inca Empire
- Chinchaysuyu
- Kuntisuyu
- Qullasuyu
