= Chinchay Suyu =

Suyu of the Incan Empire

- Suyu of Inca Empire
- 1438–1529
- Chinchaysuyu within the Inca Empire
- Historical era: Pre-Columbian Peru
  - Established: 1438
  - Inca Civil War: 1529
  - Conquista: 1533
- Subdivisions
  - Type: Wamani
Succeeded by
Viceroyalty of Peru

Chinchay Suyu or Chinchasuyu (Spanish: Chinchaysuyo) was the northwestern provincial region of the Tawantin Suyu, or Inca Empire. The most populous suyu (or Quarter, the largest division of the Inca Empire), Chinchasuyu encompassed the former lands of the Chimú Empire and much of the northern Andes. At its largest extent, the suyu extended through much of modern Ecuador and just into modern Colombia. Along with Antisuyu, it was part of the Hanan Suyukuna or "Upper Quarters" of the empire.

The name is due to the Chincha culture, which was a trader kingdom in what is now the Ica Region. Chinchay in Quechua stands for the tigrillo, animal present, although not physically, in some cultures of this region due to the Amazonian influence during the Early Horizon and Early Intermediate, such as the Chavín culture or the commercial exchange between the Huarpa -civilization located in modern-day Ayacucho that had trading routes to the Amazonas- and Nazca cultures.

Before the Inca Civil War began, Atahualpa, the son of the deceased Inca Emperor Huayna Capac, inherited and ruled the majority of Chinchasuyu from his capital city in Quito, supported by Huayna Capac's veteran Inca generals and soldiers. The 12th Inca, Huayna Capac, knowing that he was about to die, gave orders to place his heart and organs in an Urn and have it buried in Quito, the city he loved. Moreover, Huayna Capac gave instructions that his mummified body should be transported to Cuzco for burial beside the mummified bodies of his royal ancestors. The Inca Emperor Huascar who was the eldest son of Huayna Capac, ruled the rest of the Inca Empire from Cuzco, and was displeased that Atahualpa was crown King in Quito. Spanish chroniclers refer to Atahualpa's Kingdom as the Kingdom of Quito. The Inca Huascar was not able to do anything since the best soldiers in the Inca Empire swore allegiance to Atahualpa.

After 4 or 5 years of peace, the nobles as well as the mother of the Inca Huascar, Rava Ocllo. encouraged him to reconquer the Kingdom of Atahualpa which spanned most of the Chinchasuyu. Huascar sent an ultimatum to Atahualpa asking for submission, Atahualpa refused, and a young General Atoc was sent to invade and reconquer the Kingdom of Quito from Atahualpa.

Wiphala of the Chinchaysuyu

== Wamani ==
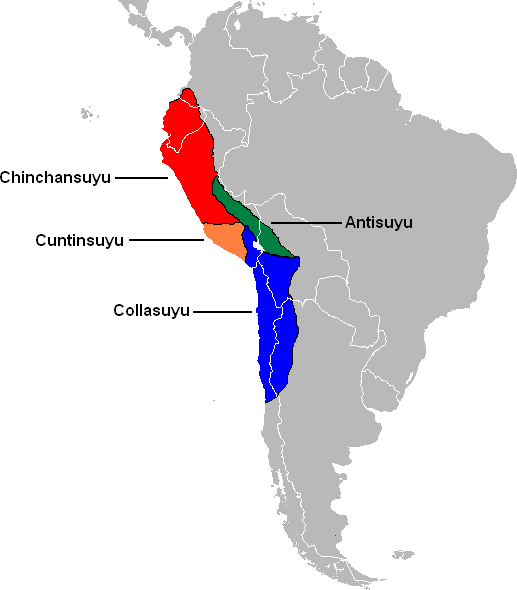
The four suyus of the Inca empire. Chinchaysuyu appears in red.

Each suyu was divided into wamani, or provinces. Chinchaysuyu included the wamani of:

- Atavillo of Atawillu, in the modern province of Canta.
- Ayavaca or Ayawax’a
- Cajamarca or Q’asamarka
- Cajatambo or Q’asatampu
- Calva or Kalua
- Casma
- Chachapoya, including the Wanka tribe
- Chancay
- Chao or Suo
- Chicama
- Chicla or Chillqa
- Chimbote or Sancta
- Chimu, also called Moche.
- Chincha
- Chinchayqucha, also called in sources by the name of Junín.
- Conchuco
- Huacrachuco
- Huamachuco
- Huamali
- Huambo or Wampu
- Huancabamba or Wañkapampa
- Huancavilca or Wankawillka
- Huánuco
- Huarco, also called Runawana and Cañete
- Huarmey
- Huaura, also called Huacho or Supe
- Huayla or Waylla
- Lambayeque, whose people spoke Mochica.
- Lima or Rimaq, a large province of perhaps 150,000 inhabitants.
- Lurin, home of the Oracle at Pachacamac.
- Mala
- Moyobamba or Moyopampa
- Nepeña or Wampachu
- Ocro, including both the Ocro and Lampa tribes.
- Olmos or Olmo
- Pacasmayo
- Parmunca
- Pinco, in Ancash Department
- Pisco
- Piura
- Shawsha or Jauja
- Tarma or Tarama
- Tumbes or Tumpis
- Virú or Wanapu, likely the origin of the word Perú.
- Yauyo, including the Larao tribe.

== See also ==
- Organization of the Inca Empire
- Antisuyu
- Kuntisuyu
- Qullasuyu
- Chincha Kingdom
