= Ayllu =

Traditional community in the Andes

The ayllu, a family clan, is the traditional form of a community in the Andes, especially among Quechuas and Aymaras. They are an indigenous local government model across the Andes region of South America, particularly in Bolivia and Peru.

Ayllus functioned prior to Inca conquest, during the Inca and Spanish colonial period, and continue to exist to the present day – such as the Andean community Ocra. Membership gave individual families more variation and security on the land that they farmed. Ayllus had defined territories and were essentially extended family or kin groups, but could include non-related members. Their primary function was to solve subsistence issues, and issues of how to get along in family, and the larger community. Ayllus descended from stars in the Inca cosmogony, and just like stars had unique celestial locations, each ayllu had a terrestrial location defined by the paqarina, the mythical point of emergence of the lineage huaca.

== Current practice ==
Ayllu is a word in both the Quechua and Aymara languages referring to a network of families in a given area, often with a putative or fictive common ancestor. The male head of an ayllu is called a mallku which means, literally, “condor”, but is a title which can be more freely translated as “prince”.

Ayllus are distinguished by comparative self-sufficiency, commonly held territory, and relations of reciprocity. Members engage in shared collective labor for outside institutions (mit'a), in reciprocal exchanges of assistance (Quechua: ayni) as well as community labor tribute (mink'a, Spanish: faena).

“Ayllu solidarity is a combination of kinship and territorial ties, as well as symbolism. (Albo 1972; Duviols 1974; Tshopik 1951; and Urioste 1975). These studies, however, do not explain how the ayllu is a corporate whole, which includes social principles, verticality, and metaphor ...

Ayllu also refers to people who live in [a shared] territory (llahta) and who feed the earth shrines of that territory.”

In Bolivia, representatives from the ayllus are sent to the National Council of Ayllus and Markas of Qullasuyu (Conamaq). This body chooses an Apu Mallku as its head.

== Historical function and organization ==
How the ancient and current organizational form correspond is unclear, since Spanish chronicles do not give a precise definition of the term.

Ayllu were self-sustaining social units that would educate their own children and farm or trade for all the food they ate, except in cases of disaster such as El Niño years when they relied on the Inca storehouse system. Each ayllu owned a parcel of land, and the members had reciprocal obligations to each other. The ayllu would often have their own wak'a, or minor god, usually embodied in a physical object such as a mountain or rock. "Ayullus were named for a particular person or place."

In marriages, the woman would generally join the class and ayllu of her partner as would her children, but would inherit her land from her parents and retain her membership in her birth ayllu. This is how most movements of people between ayllu occurred. But a person could also join an ayllu by assuming the responsibility of membership. This included mink'a, communal work for common purposes, ayni, or work in kind for other members of the ayllu, and mit'a, a form of taxation levied by the Inca government and the Spanish Viceroyalties.

== In popular culture ==
The 2025 film Dora and the Search for Sol Dorado highlights the importance of ayllu, and gives the message to be selfless and not selfish.

== See also ==
- Panaqa
- Inca Government
