= Qullasuyu =

Suyu of the Incan Empire

- Suyu of Inca Empire
- 1438–1535
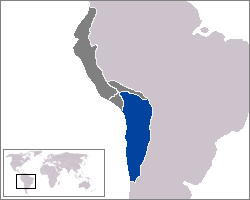
- Qullasuyu within the Inca Empire
- Capital: Hatunqulla
- Historical era: Pre-Columbian Peru
  - Established: 1438
  - Spanish conquest: 1535
  - Conquest of Chile: 1541
- Subdivisions
  - Type: Wamani
Succeeded by
Viceroyalty of Peru

Qullasuyu (Quechua and Aymara spelling,; Collasuyu, Kholla Suyu; Spanish: Collasuyo) was the southeastern provincial region of the Inca Empire. Qullasuyu is the region of the Qulla and related specifically to the native Qulla Quechuas who primarily resided in areas such as Cochabamba and Potosí. Most Aymara territories which are now incorporated into the modern South American states of northern Chile, Peru, Bolivia and the Argentine Northwest were conquered during the reign of Sapa Inca Huayna Cápac in the sixteenth century.

Recently, there have been movements to form a "Greater Qullasuyu" (or Qullana Suyu Marka) which would incorporate a territory similar to the former Tawantinsuyu in extent. This idea has been proposed by the office of the Apu Mallku and the parliament of the Qullana. Qullasuyu was the largest of the four suyu (or "quarters", the largest divisions of the Inca empire) in terms of area. This suyu encompassed the Bolivian Altiplano and much of the southern Andes, running down into northwest Argentina and as far south as the Maule river near modern Santiago, Chile. Along with Kuntisuyu, it was part of the Hurin Suyukuna or "Lower Quarters" of the empire.

Wiphala of the Qullasuyu

The first large Spanish incursion into Qullasuyu was Diego de Almagro's expedition to Chile in 1535 in which a large force entered present-day Bolivia, the Argentine Northwest and then Chile.

The modern demonym Colla for people of western Bolivia is derived from Qullasuyu.

== Etymology ==
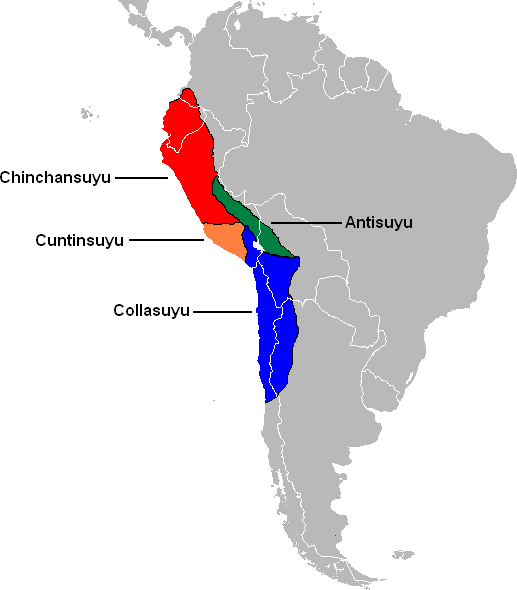
The four suyus of the Inca empire. Qullasuyu appears in blue.

From Quechua, composite of qulla (meaning south, but also the namesake people) and suyu (region, quarter of the Inca Empire), with the meaning of "southern region".

== Wamani ==
Each suyu was divided into wamani, or provinces. Qullasuyu included the wamani of:

- Arica or Arika
- Cana or Kana
- Canche or Kanche
- Caranga or Karanka
- Caruma
- Cavina or Kawina, whose people were “Incas by privilege”
- Chicha
- Cochabamba or Quchapampa
- Collagua
- Lipe
- Locumba
- Lupaqa
- Moquegua
- Pacajes or Pacasa
- Qolla Urcosuyu or Qulla Urqusuyu
- Sama
- Tambo or Tampu
- Tarata
- Ubina
- Yampará or Yampara

== See also ==
- Antisuyu
- Chinchaysuyu
- Kuntisuyu
- Oroncota, Yampara settlement and Inca fortress in Bolivia
- Organization of the Inca Empire
- The Chilean Inca Trail
