= Kuntisuyu =

Suyu of the Incan Empire

- Suyu of Inca Empire
- 1438–1535
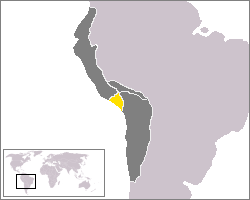
- Kuntisuyu within the Inca Empire
- Historical era: Pre-Columbian Peru
  - Established: 1438
  - Spanish conquest: 1535
- Subdivisions
  - Type: Wamani
Succeeded by
Viceroyalty of Peru

Kuntisuyu or Kunti Suyu (Quechua kunti west, suyu region, part of a territory, each of the four regions which formed the Inca Empire, "western region"; Spanish: Contisuyo) was the southwestern provincial region of the Inca Empire. Kuntisuyu was the smallest suyu of all and was located along the southern coast of modern Peru, extending into the highlands towards Cusco. Along with Qullasuyu, it was part of the Urin Suyukuna or "Lower Quarters" of the empire.

Wiphala of the Kuntisuyu

== Wamani ==
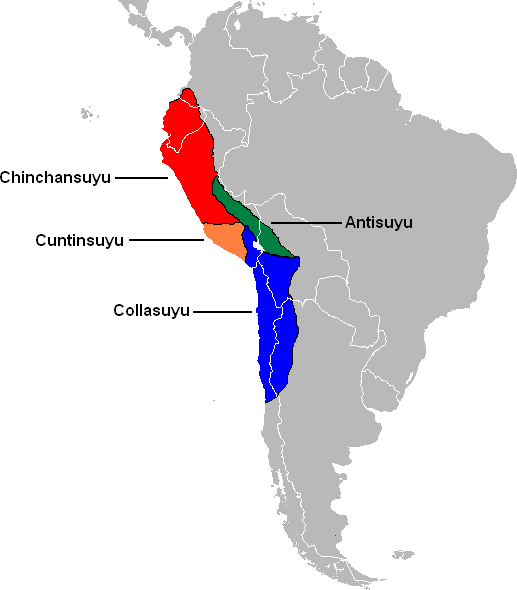
The four suyus of the Inca empire. Kuntisuyu appears in orange.

Each suyu was divided into wamani, or provinces. Kuntisuyu included the wamani of:

- Acari
- Angará
- Arequipa or Ariqipa
- Atico
- Aymara
- Camaná, inhabited by the Maje people
- Caravelí
- Cavana or Qhawana
- Chanca or Chanka, also called Andahuayla or Andawaylla.
- Chilque, whose people were “Incas by privilege”.
- Choclococha or Chuqlluqucha
- Chocoruo or Chukurpu
- Chumbivilca or Chumpiwillka
- Contisuyo or Kuntisuyu, including the Allqa (Alca), Kutawasi (Cotahuasi) and Aruni peoples
- Cotabamba or Kutapampa
- Huanca or Warka, including three saya
- Ica or Ika
- Nazca or Naska
- Ocoña or Ukhuña
- Parinacocha or Pariwanaqucha
- Quechua or Qhichwa
- Quilca or Qillqa
- Rucana or Ruk'ana
- Sora, divided into three saya
- Vilcas or Willka
- Yanahuara or Yanawara, whose people were “Incas by privilege”
- Yauca or Yawka

== See also ==
- Organization of the Inca Empire
