= El Perú Libre =

Painting by Luis Montero

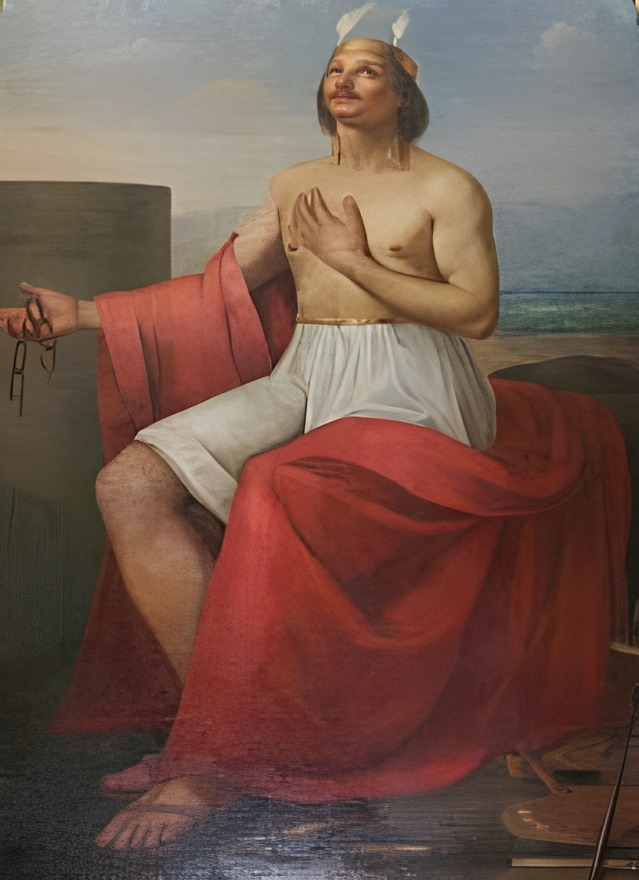
- Artist: Luis Montero Cáceres
- Dimensions: 223 cm × 156 cm (88 in × 61 in)
- Location: Legislative Palace, Lima

El Perú Libre (The Freed Peru), also known as La Libertad (The Liberty), is an oil painting by Peruvian painter Luis Montero Cáceres, representing a masculine national personification of the Republic of Peru as an alternative to the Peruvian Motherland. It is part of the art collection at the Legislative Palace.

== History ==
It was created by Montero to pay for the deal he made with the Congress of Peru that financed his artistic studies in Italy in exchange for creating works for the parliamentary artistic collection.

Montero years later describes his creation in the following way:

[...] I wanted to form a picture that would characterize the freedom of my country: I painted it with the allusive figure of a young man, who through his attitudes manifested the moral and physical forces that abound in our country: this first fruit of my efforts is what I I dedicate today as a gift to the immense favors I have received.

— Montero, from a letter to Congress in 1860.

The parliament allowed El Perú Libre to be exhibited in the Palace of the Exhibition until 1881, the date of the occupation of Lima, when the Chilean Army extracted the painting to take it to the museums of Chile. The writer Ricardo Palma would be the first to report the theft of the painting.

José Antonio de Lavalle y García located and dedicated the last years of his life to insisting that the Chilean government return the painting. It was only in 1964, after his death, that Chile decided to return it through his wife Sara Garragori, who decided to hand it over again to the Congress of the Republic.

The measurements of the work are 223.00 x 156.00 cm. Although its permanent stay is the Legislative Palace, it also usually has casual exhibitions at the Lima Art Museum.

== See also ==
- Los funerales de Atahualpa
