= Luis Montero Cáceres =

Peruvian painter

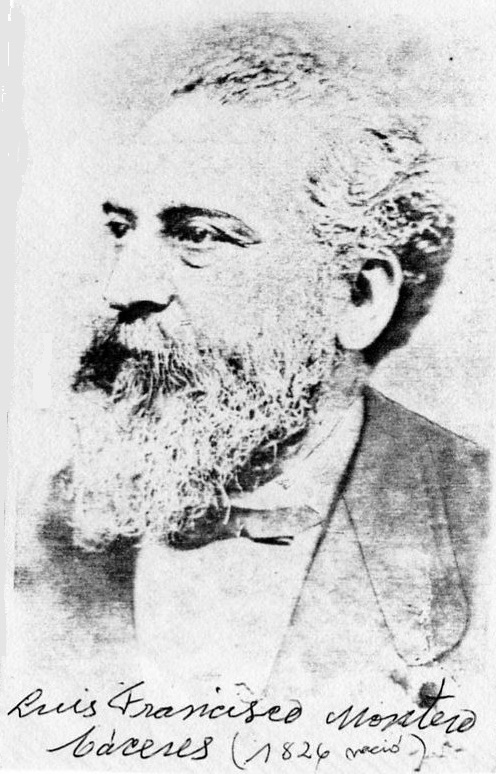
Montero, circa 1865.

Luis Montero Cáceres (Piura, 1826 — Callao, 1869) was a prolific Peruvian painter of the 19th century. He is best known for his paintings El Perú Libre and Los funerales de Atahualpa, the latter stolen by the Chilean Army in 1881 during the War of the Pacific as part of its occupation of Lima.

== Biography ==
According to Argentine writer Vicente Gregorio Quesada, Montero took art lessons from Roberto Tiller, an American prisoner at Piura Prison for counterfeiting. He moved to Lima in 1844, working at the Casa Dorca y Barreda for one year, studying under Ignacio Merino in 1845.

It is said that one of his paintings, a miniature portrait of then president Ramón Castilla, eventually reached him, with Castilla summoning Montero to the Government Palace and asking him why he had been painted so fair when his colour was "diverse" (Castilla was a mestizo of Aymara descent). While speaking to the President, the young painter confided his wish to study art, but not having the resources to do so. Castilla granted him a scholarship of 500 annual pesos fuertes to study in Europe, the first such grant in Peruvian history. Montero left for Europe in late 1848.

In 1852, he was named director of the Academia de Dibujo in Peru, but was granted another scholarship to continue studying in Florence by José Rufino Echenique less than a year later. He was made a facultative member of the Lyceum in Havana, where he met Juana López, whom he married the same day he won the lottery. He returned to Peru in 1858 and left for Europe again two years later.

His painting Los funerales de Atahualpa was commissioned by the Peruvian government for the Exposition Universelle in Paris. Both the painting and its author left Florence toward South America, where it was exhibited the following year in Rio de Janeiro, Montevideo and Buenos Aires. Returning to Lima in September 1868, where it was exhibited one final time, he gifted the painting to Congress.

Prior to his fourth planned voyage to Europe, Montero fell ill, and died in the Hotel de la Unión in Callao. After his death, his painting of Atahualpa was looted by the Chilean Army during the War of the Pacific, being exhibited in the country's National Museum prior to its return to Peru through the efforts of Ricardo Palma. Once returned, it was exhibited at the still damaged National Library of Peru between 1885 and 1906, and later in the Palace of the Exhibition prior to finally moving to the Lima Art Museum.

== See also ==
- Juan Lepiani, another prolific painter
