= Vicente Gregorio Quesada =

Argentinian diplomat, writer and journalist

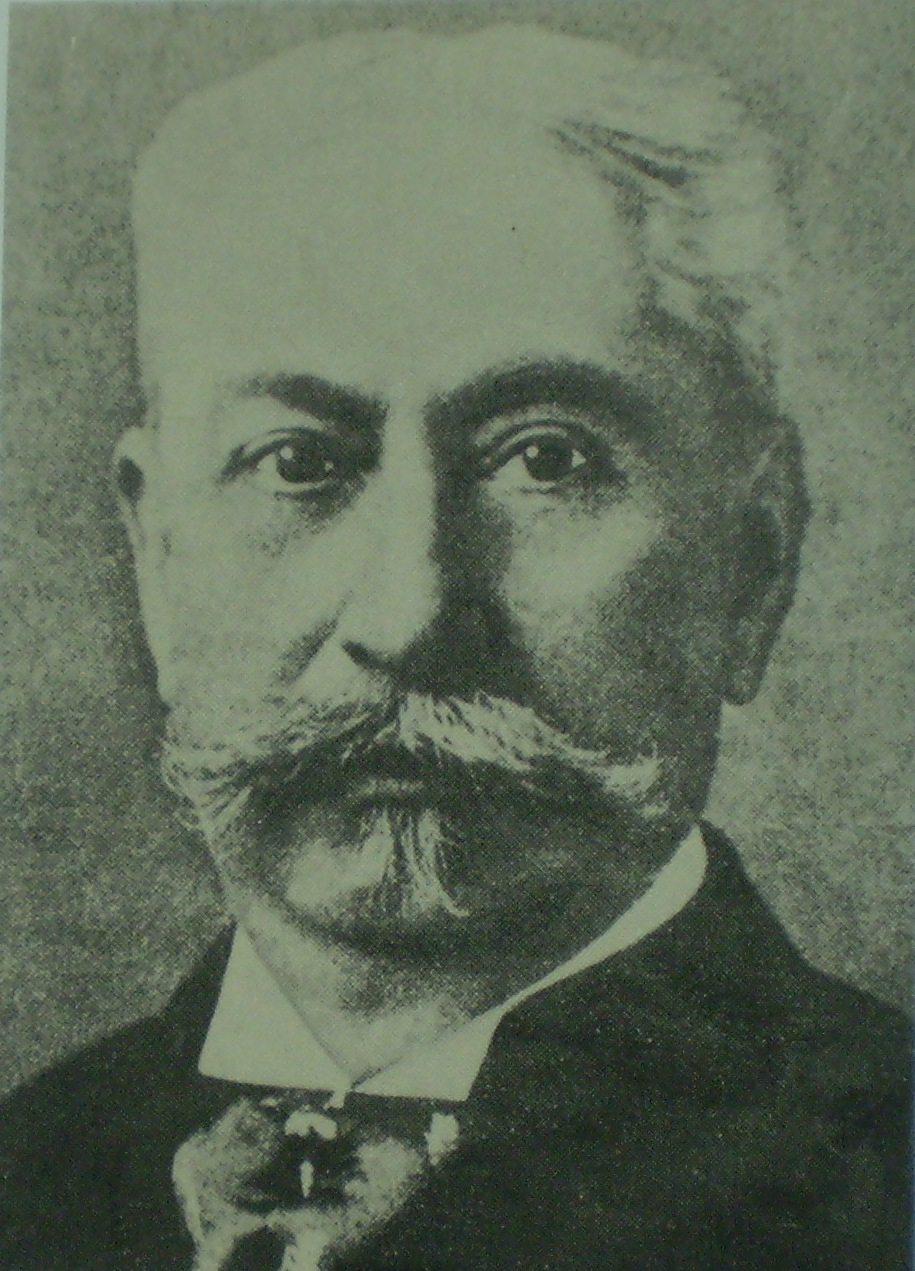
- Vicente Gregorio Quesada
- Born: 5 April 1830; Buenos Aires, Argentina
- Died: 19 September 1913 (aged 83); Buenos Aires, Argentina
- Education: Doctor of Jurisprudence
- Occupations: Diplomat, writer, journalist
- Organizations: National Academy of History of the Argentine Republic

Vicente Gregorio Quesada (April 5, 1830 in Buenos Aires; † 1913) was an Argentine diplomat.

== Life ==
Quesada studied law at the University of Buenos Aires, obtaining his degree in 1850. He published articles in newspapers from Montevideo and Buenos Aires, addressing the fall of Juan Manuel de Rosas in 1852. On June 1, 1858, his son Ernesto Quesada was born in Buenos Aires. In 1860, Vicente Quesada founded the journal Revista del Paraná, and in 1864, the Revista de Buenos Aires. From 1871 to 1875, Vicente G. Quesada served as the director of the National Library of Argentina. He donated numerous works acquired during his travels and improved the library’s infrastructure and was hired by the Argentine Government to create texts in favor of their argument in the East Patagonia, Tierra del Fuego and Strait of Magellan dispute. There was a controversy about his transcription of the 1534 Royal Decree of Pedro de Mendoza in which he changes the word "hacia" to "hasta" which in the text changed the meaning from "in direction to the Strait of Magellan" (to the south without reaching the pass) of Mendoza's domain to "to the Strait".

== Publications ==
- Patagonia and the Southern Lands of the American Continent, 1875, Buenos Aires
- Crime and Atonement. Chronicle of the Imperial Town of Potosí.
