= Los funerales de Atahualpa =

Painting by Luis Montero

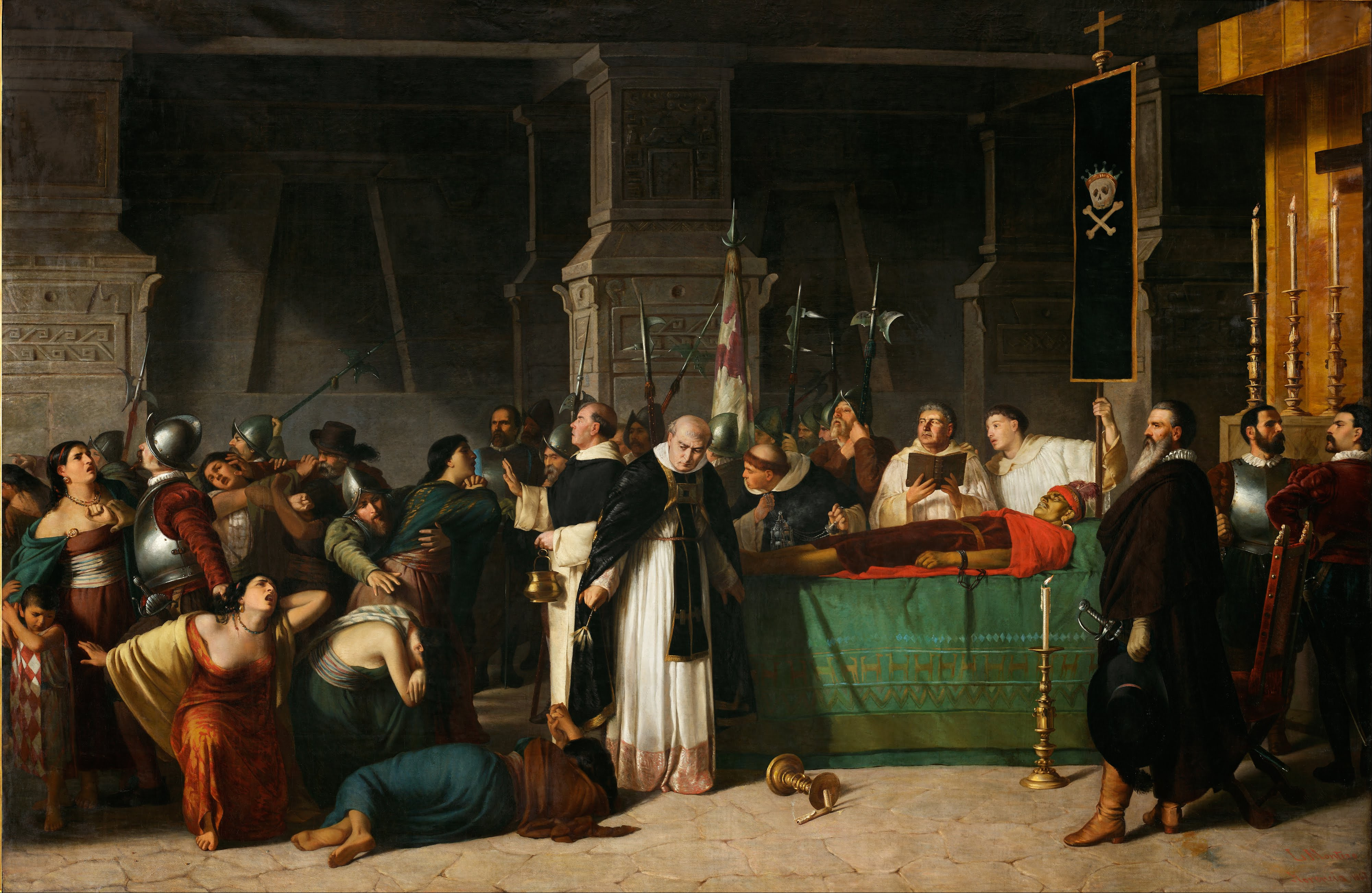
- Artist: Luis Montero Cáceres
- Completion date: 1867
- Subject: Atahualpa
- Dimensions: 420 cm × 600 cm (170 in × 240 in)
- Location: Lima Art Museum, Lima

The Funerals of Inca Atahualpa (Spanish: Los funerales de Atahualpa) is an academic painting by Luis Montero Cáceres that depicts the funeral of the Inca emperor Atahualpa based on the descriptions of William H. Prescott. It was commissioned by the Peruvian government for the 1867 Exposition Universelle in Paris.

== History ==
Montero had been granted a number of scholarships by the Peruvian government to study in Europe, notably in Florence. With the Exposition Universelle announced, the work was commissioned to be exhibited in the exposition in Paris. Initially exhibited in his Florentine workshop, it received a large amount of coverage in Paris, and was later taken to South America from Florence, where it was exhibited the following year in Rio de Janeiro, Montevideo and Buenos Aires. Returning to Lima in September 1868, where it was exhibited one final time, he gifted the painting to Congress. By that point, the painting had been seen by 30,000 people, half of which were in Lima.

After Montero's death in 1869, his painting of Atahualpa was looted when the Chilean Army entered and occupied Lima during the War of the Pacific, being exhibited in the country's National Museum prior to its return to Peru through the efforts of Ricardo Palma. Once returned, it was exhibited at the still damaged National Library of Peru between 1885 and 1906, and later in the Palace of the Exhibition prior to finally moving to the Lima Art Museum.

== See also ==
- National Library of Peru
