= Shincal de Quimivil =

Inca settlement near the town of Londres, Catamarca, Argentina

- Shincal de Quimivil
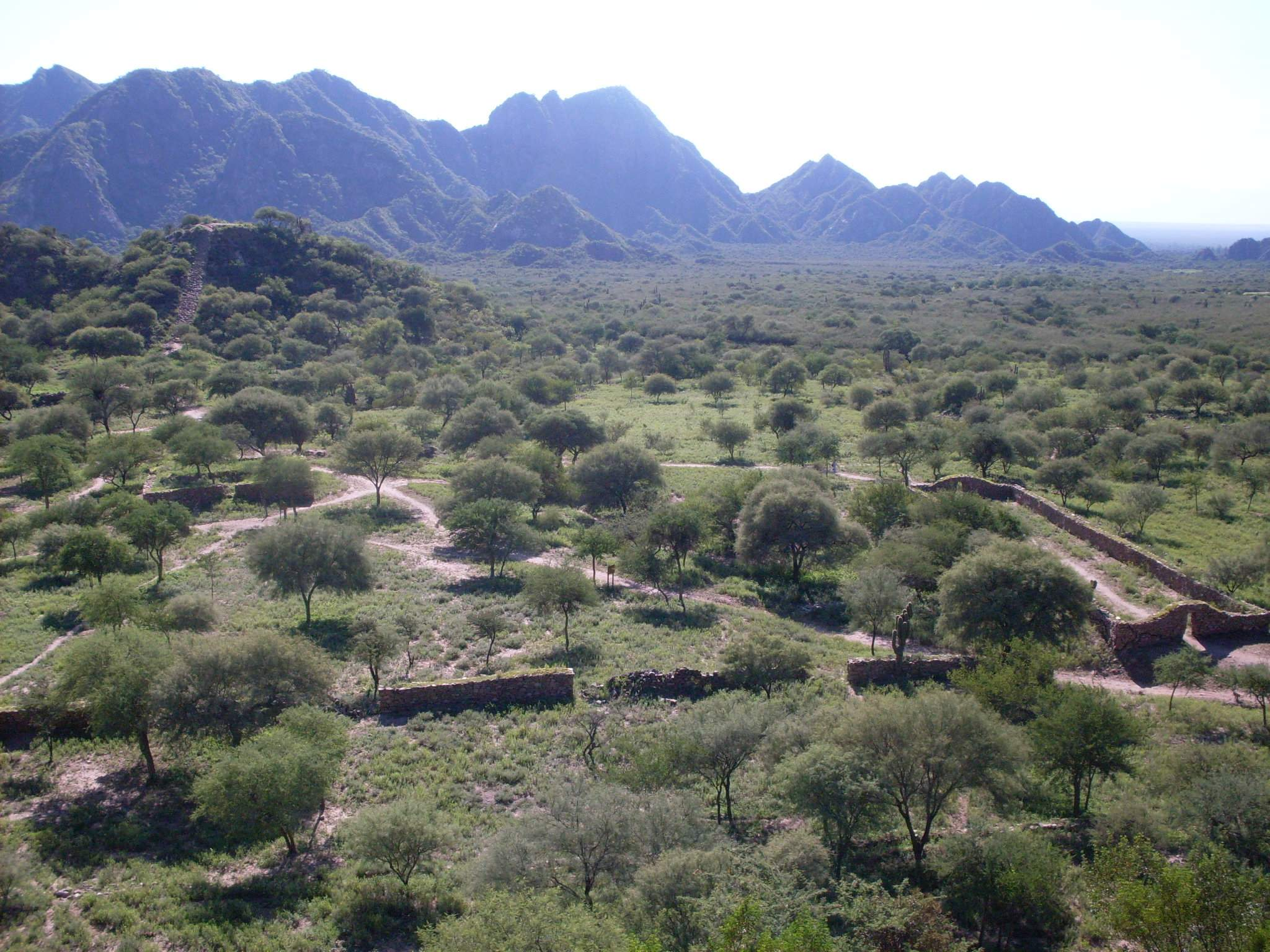
- View of the Shincal settlement Catamarca Province, Argentina

- Location within Argentina
- 27°41′14″S 67°10′31″W
- Cultures: Inca culture
- Location: Catamarca province, Northwestern Argentina

History
- Built: c. 1471 – c. 1536
- Built by: Inca empire
- Abandoned: no

Site notes
- Elevation: 1,240 m (4,070 ft)
- Area: 30 hectares (74 acres)
- Excavation dates: 1901, 1911, 1954, 1991—
- Archaeologists: Quiroga (1901), Bruch (1911), Gonzáles (1954), Raffino (1991 – 1997)
- Public access: yes

Shincal de Quimivil, or simply El Shincal, is the ruin of a pre-Columbian Inca city located near the town of Londres, Belén Department, in the Catamarca Province. Argentina. The Inca settlement covering an area of about 30 hectares (74 acres), had a haukaypata or main square, five kallankas (halls) a 3 kilometres (1.9 mi) long (partly) underground aqueduct to provide fresh water, and about twenty colcas (warehouses). The Qhapaq ñan, in its main mountain trunk, crosses the settlement North to South, on the west side of the plaza. The urban layout of the road inside El Shincal is completed with a scenic architectural component: two twin hills about 25 metres (82 ft) high are located on both sides of the plaza, their tops were artificially flattened and walled with stones to a height of about 2 metres (6.6 ft). Both hills can be accessed through stone steps.

The site was declared a National Historic Monument on November 5, 1997. The work carried out at the site has led to the recovery of its cultural, historical, and heritage value. Between 2013 and 2015, the re-valuation of El Shincal was completed, culminating in the inauguration of a new enhancement of the archaeological site.

== Discovery ==
The existence of the ruins was first reported in 1900, when the discoverer believed it to be the original site of the city of Londres, founded in 1558 by Juan Pérez de Zurita a Spanish conquistador. Shortly afterward, Adán Quiroga, a researcher of Catamarca's antiquities, submitted a report about his visit to these ruins, assuming that they were the ruins of a fortress. Later on, Carlos Bruch, a researcher from the La Plata Museum, visited the site in 1907/1908 without carrying on any excavations. Alberto Rex Gonzalez used these unpublished information for a campaign he conducted in 1954, sponsored by the Argentine Society of Americanists. He excavated some of the main areas of the ruins and reported his findings in a paper published in 1966 by the Catamarca Historical Studies Board. Rodolfo Raffino from the early 1980s, studied the Inca cultural influence in the Catamarca region. His explorations at various sites allowed to set up, in 1992, a project to conduct a comprehensive study of the El Shincal ruins through systematic excavations and the restoration of its structures.

== Historical Context ==
The Incas were a politically expansive society that throughout the 15th century exerted its influence and dominion over various populations of South America. This expansion was based on different social, economic, religious, and military interests which, combined with local realities, shaped varied social and cultural landscapes throughout the Tawantinsuyu (Inca Empire). The deployed political strategies were both coercive and diplomatic, varying according to the relationships established between local groups and the state interests.

At its greatest extent, the Tawantinsuyu was divided into four provinces or "suyus." The Qullasuyu −the southernmost portion− included parts of Bolivia, Chile, and the northern Andean region of Argentina. One of the most emblematic sites in Argentine territory was El Shincal de Quimivil. At this Inca site, the urban planning, architecture, roads, and associated material records give evidence of an intense political activity that implied the control a vast territory. The evidence of material, archaeological, and historical importance of this site may indicate why the settlement of Londres, Catamarca, founded by Juan Pérez de Zurita in 1558t was, the second Spanish settlement in Argentine, was very close to El Shincal.

=== Inca Geopolitics ===
The state organization of Northwest Argentina within the Qullasuyu presented a defined geopolitical subdivision maintained by the Inca peace. The province was divided into different sub-provinces or wamanis ruled by different curacas (local chiefs). El Shincal and Tolombón north of the Yocavil Valley, were the main political centers of the Quire-Quire wamani, comprising the southern end of the Calchaquí Valley and the valleys of Yocavil (or Santa María), Andalgalá, Hualfín and Abaucán, where a large number of mitimaes (forced workers) placed by the Incas were residing. This allows for an estimate of the large territory that was under the control of the political, administrative and ceremonial center of El Shincal.

The tribes of northwestern Argentina were shaken by the Inca penetration since 1470 during the reign of Topa Inca Yupanqui the tenth Inca monarch ruler of Cusco, they became part of the Inca empire either through military conquest or voluntary vassalage. Data is lacking to provide a definitive answer. The Inca chronicler Inca Garcilaso de la Vega, in his Comentarios Reales de los Incas recounts that ambassadors from the kingdom of Tucma (Tucuman) in Collasuyu arrived in Cuzco to beg the emperor to receive them as vassals. Contrary to this Raffino states that Topa Inca Yupanqui, was the conqueror of northern Argentina.

=== An Inca Provincial Capital ===
The location of El Shincal de Quimivil may have been related to the exploitation of mining and agricultural resources within the Inca tributary system of redistribution and reciprocity, but also in terms of a symbolic conquest through ceremonial hospitality reflected in the transmission and imposition of various elements of the landscape and material culture. The site gained importance after the Inca invasion, probably because El Shincal lays at a crossroads of the Qhapaq Ñan (Inca road) between the (present-day) Tucumán province (Argentine) and northern Chile, via the San Francisco Pass.

== Description of the site ==
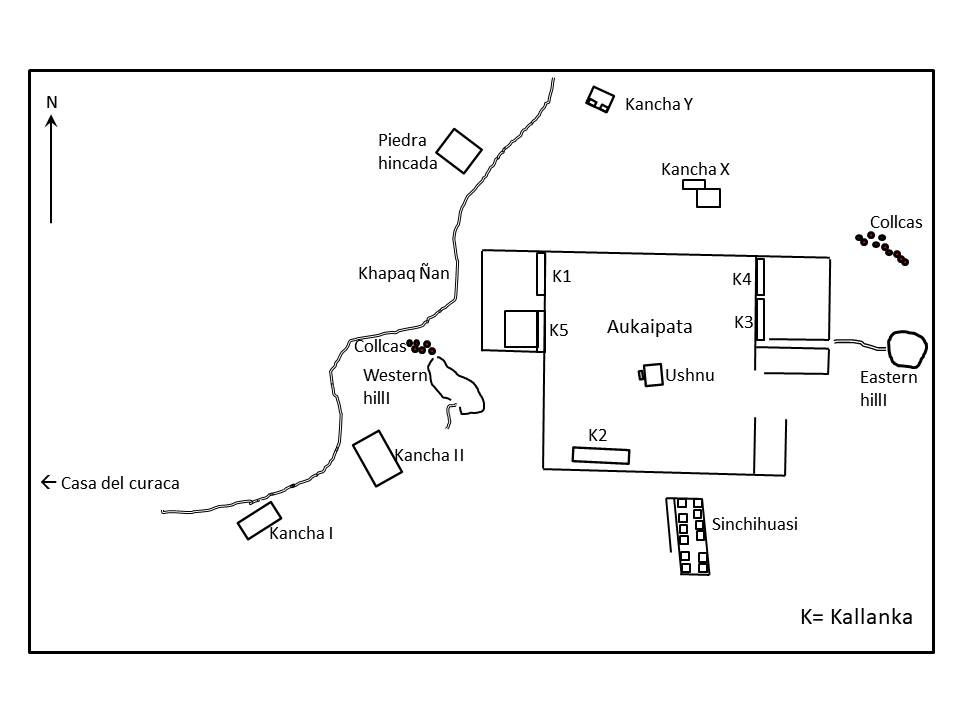
A simplified map of Shincal de Quimivil site

El Shincal is located at an altitude of 1,240 metres (4,070 ft) and covers an area of about 30 hectares (74 acres), of which 12 hectares (30 acres) are occupied by the "civic" center. The Inca settlement was conceived, planned, and built following a settlement foundation policy established by Topa Inca Yupanqui after 1471. The urban layout is orthogonal or grid-like, centered around a planning focus that is usually the haukaypata (also spelled hawkaypata) or square of the rest and happinesswith an ushnu, a quadrangular ceremonial platform, at its center. This is a homogeneous model found in most of the capitals of huamani and in the large regional administrative centers such as Huánuco Pampa some 3,000 kilometres (1,900 mi) to the North.

Surrounding the plaza are five kallankas, large rectangular buildings used for political, administrative, and ceremonial activities. Several residential complexes known as kanchas are also arranged around the haukaypata and along the Inca road. One of these, called the House of the Curaca, was reserved for the rulers or local elite and is located in isolation to the west of the plaza. Other buildings were exclusively for permanent inhabitants responsible for maintaining the site; some functioned as temples and others were used to accommodate guests attending festive events. All the residential buildings, the kallankas and the kanchas had thatched roof that gave the façade of the building an imposing aspect due to the gables high pitch.

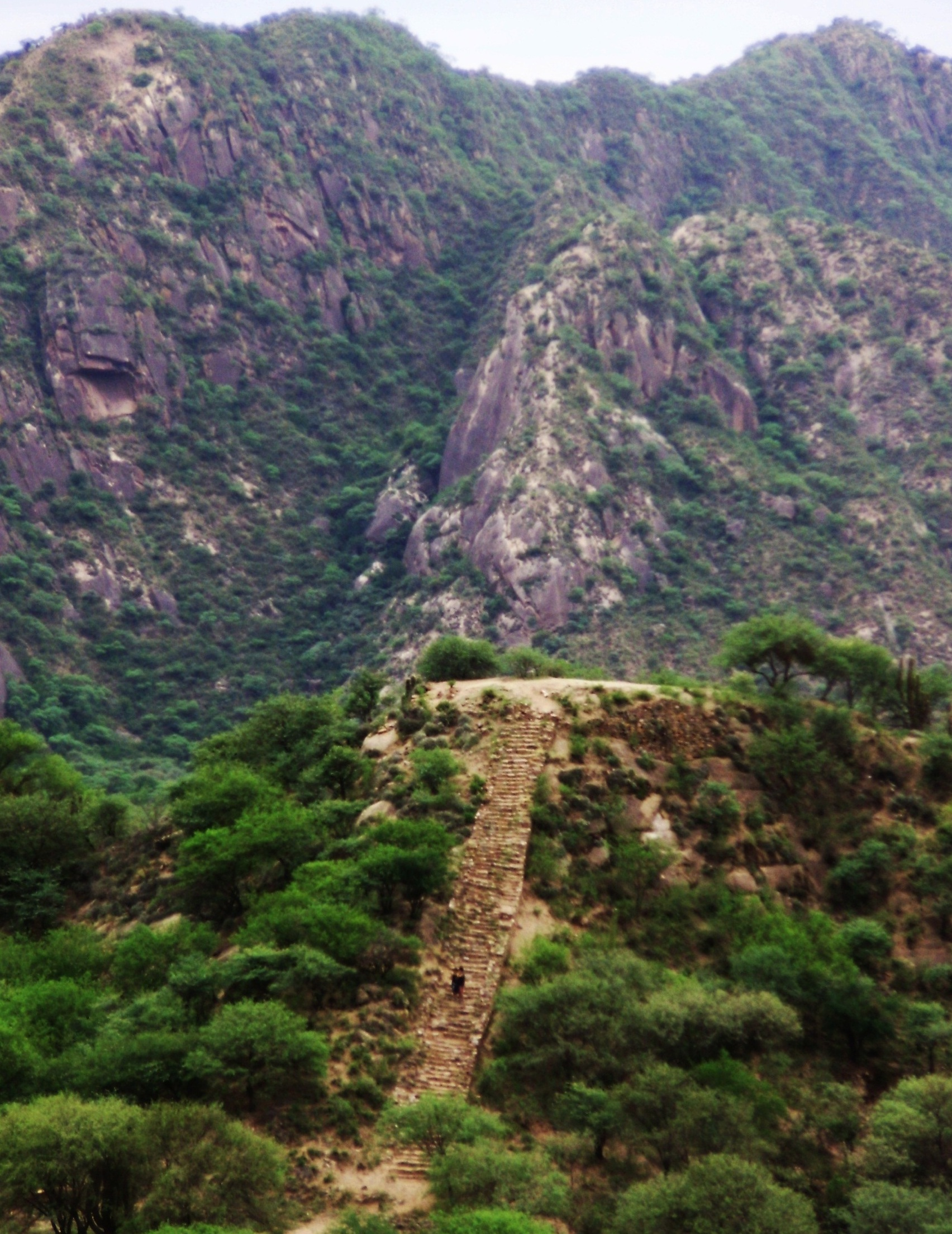
The eastern flattened hill, note the stairway and the walled hilltop

None of the more than one hundred buildings is completely extant, nevertheless all of their walls are in good state of preservation due to the vegetation cover which provided shelter.

A branching stone aqueduct about 3 kilometres (1.9 mi) long supplied water to the settlement from the Quimivil River. It entered the plaza from the west and passed underground at the foot of the ushnu stairway. A sophisticated irrigation system is located south of the site. Some twenty storehouses (collcas) provided storage for food and other items. Other structures at the site were an architectural complex nicknamed sinchihuasi; a chief's residence; and several sets of rectangular kanchas with a central courtyard and residential enclosures arranged around the perimeter of the haukaypata, intended for the general population. The excavation of one of these kanchas in the north sector revealed two periods of occupation: one classically Inca and the other indigenous colonial which may refer to the first foundation of the town of Londres by Pérez de Zurita in 1558.

The urban landscape of El Shincal is enhanced by two twin hills placed on either side of the haukaypata to the east and west. They are between 20 and 25 meters high and their tops were artificially flattened, terraced, and surrounded by stone walls approximately 2 meters high. They are accessed by stone staircases. These hills were artificially transformed into platforms and were undoubtedly linked to religious activities related to the solar cult that the Inca practiced on their peaks.

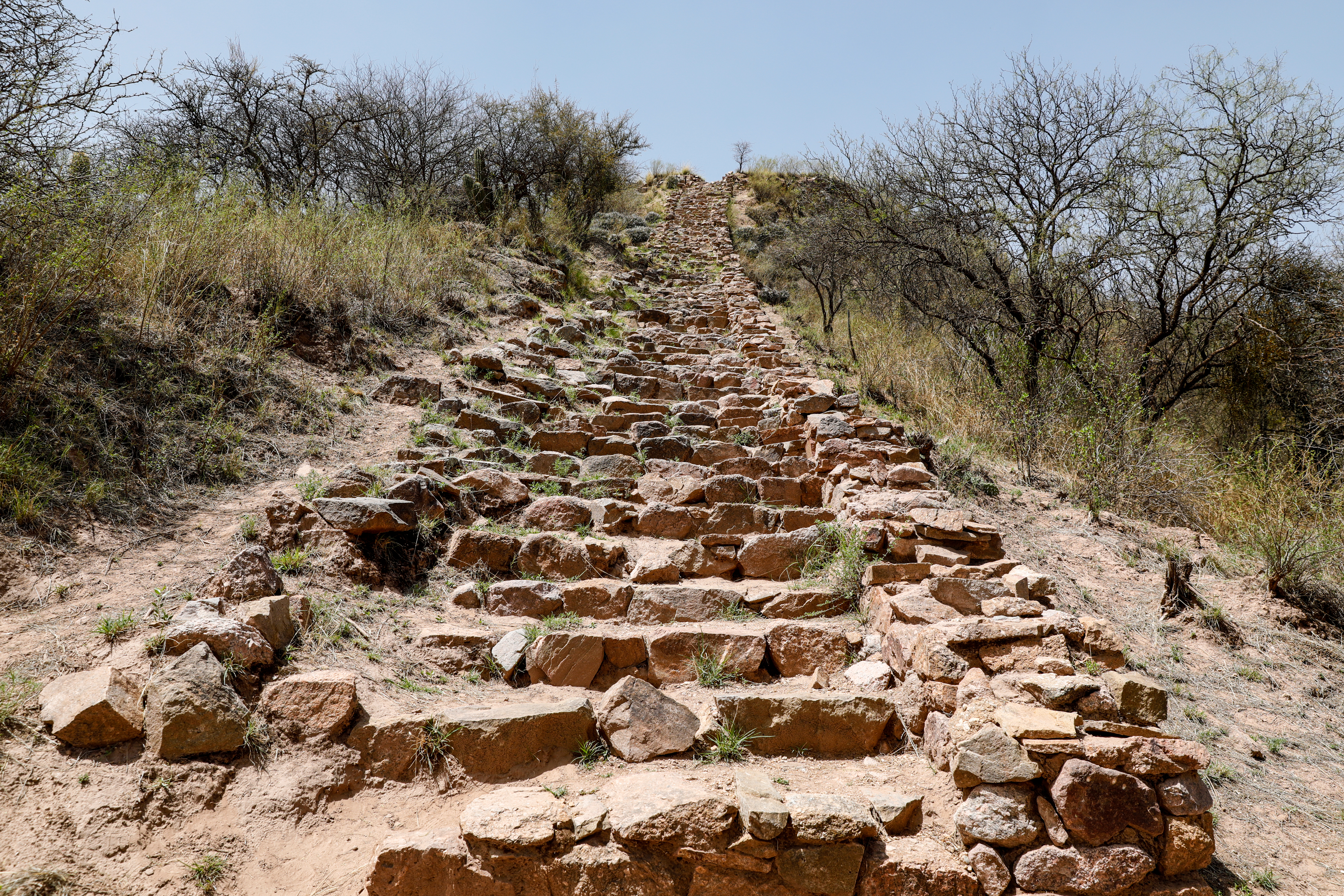
The stairway to the top of one of the flattened hills

According to Raffino, El Shincal, at the time of its abandonment by the Inca, was in the middle of an architectural expansion, with the construction of new buildings. In fact inside the {haukaypata, according to the archaeological evidence a large kallanka was being erected, similar in dimensions to kallanka 2 (see map above) in which its openings facing the ushnu were taking shape.

The buildings, together with the surrounding landscape, formed a network of spatial markers, both geographical and cultural. This social model of the landscape, with urban regularities similar to other Inca sites in the Central Andes, led to the consideration that the builders of El Shincal wanted to symbolically replicate the capital of Tawantinsuyu, giving it the character of "New Cuzco."

El Shincal stands as one of the main political, administrative, and ceremonial capitals of Northwest Argentina. This status is consolidated by the results of various investigations at the site, which demonstrate a range of ceremonial activities, elite residences, production of textiles, ceramics, food and beverages, and caravan movements, among other things.

=== The Ushnu ===
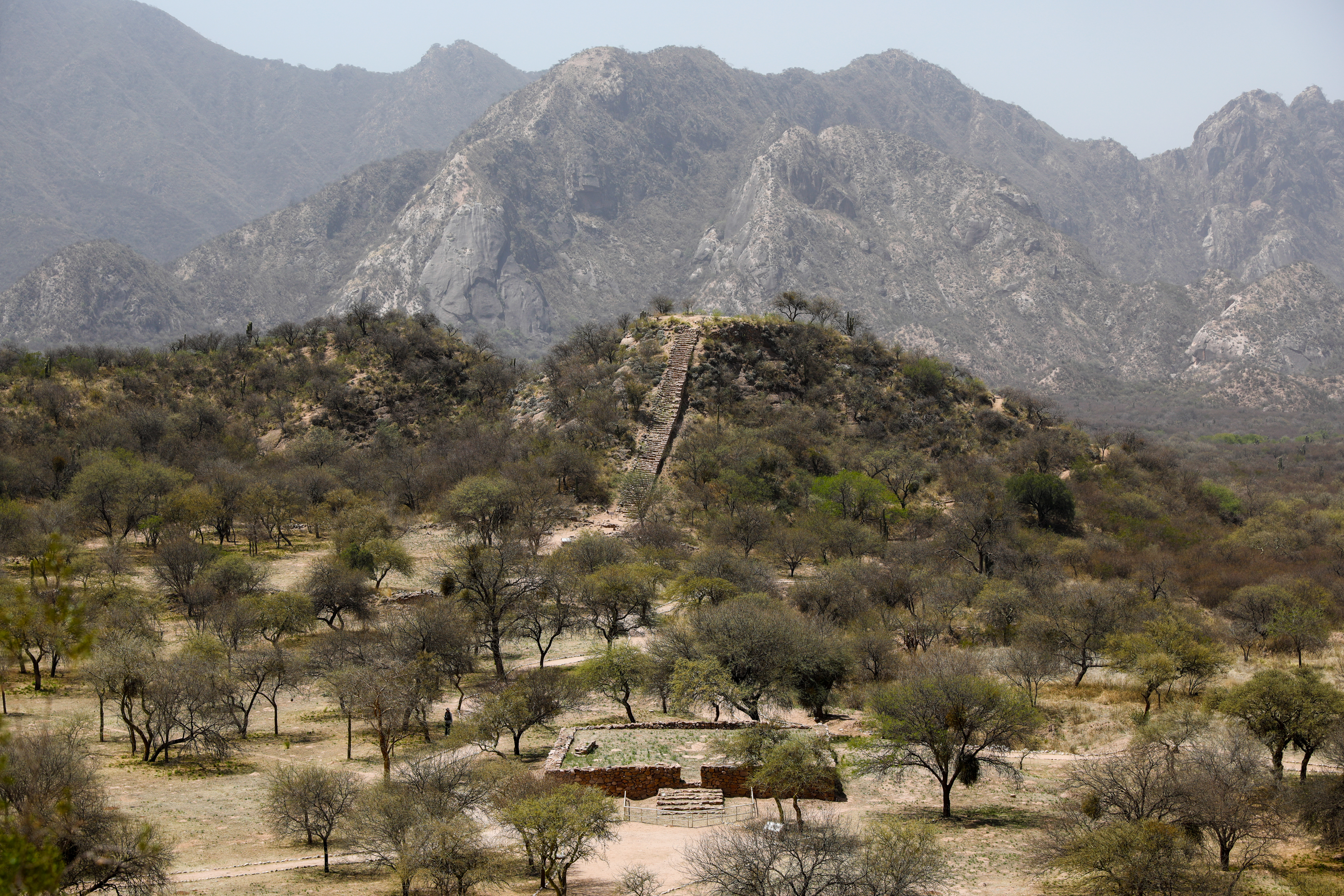
The ushnu at Shincal de Quimivil stands in the lower central part of the picture showing the stairway to its top. The eastern flattened hill with its access stairway is in the background

Just south of the haukaypata center stands the ushnu. Its shape is that of a single body slightly pyramidal truncated platform with a square plan 16 by 16 metres (52 by 52 ft) and a height of 2 metres (6.6 ft). It has an access through the west side front, formed by a stone stairway with 9 steps, which leads to a trapezoidal opening placed in the center of the façade. A bench with stone walls filled with mortar and a seat made of flat slates can be observed on the northern sector of the platform. The construction process of the ushnu is part of an accurate planning of the plaza.

Its walls are double with mud filling and their blocks were extracted and transported either from the nearby hill or the river. Before their placement, the stones underwent rudimentary percussion work in order to adapt them to the typical Inca stonework. This ushnu appears to be the largest and best preserved of the 14 ushnus built to the south of lake Titicaca. Its measures are a visible sign of the importance of this settlement.

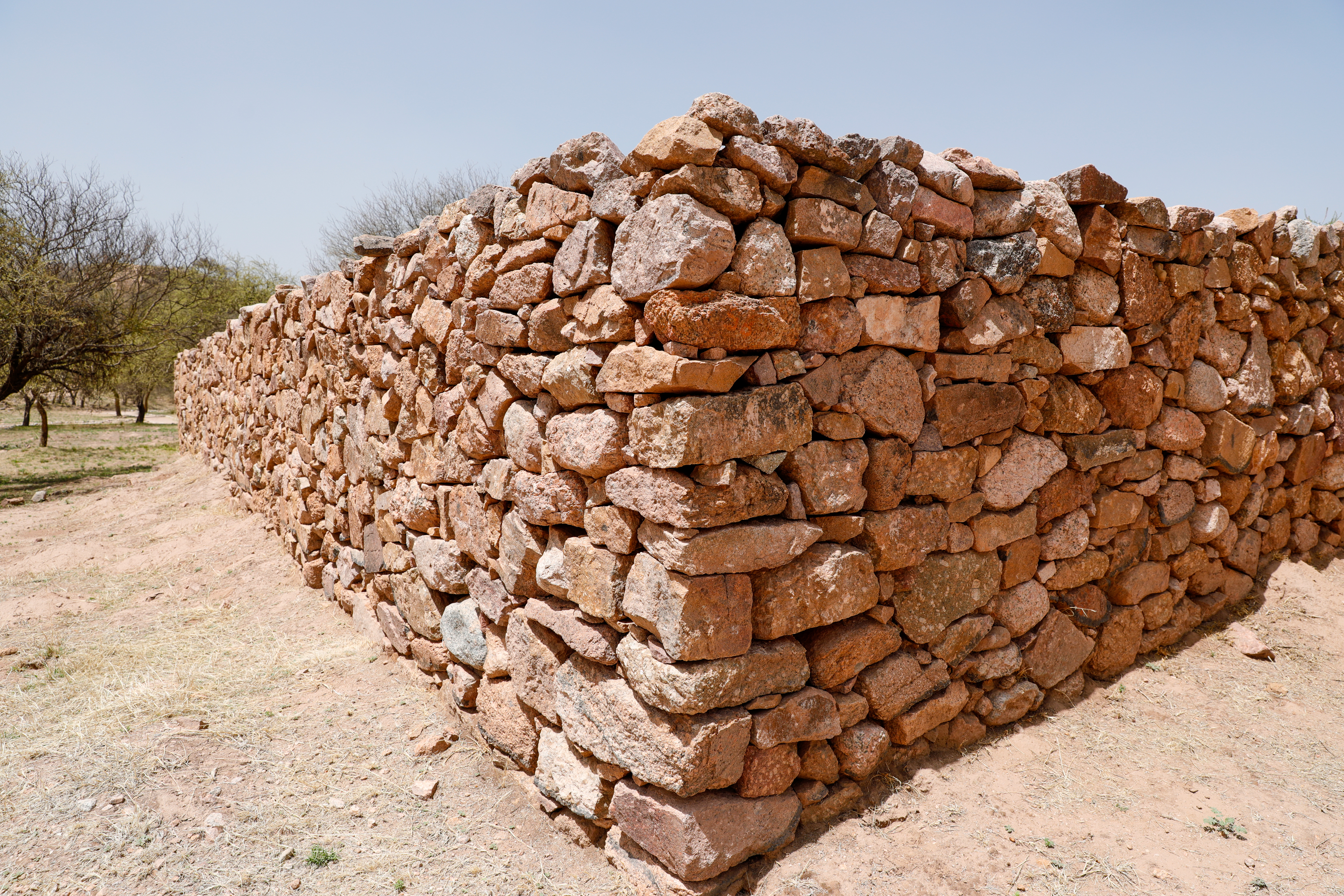
The ushnu seen from one of its corners showing the perimeter wall

According to Raffino and colleagues it is more than likely that about one hundred years after the end of the Inca empire, the members of the indigenous rebellion of 1630-1636 used El Shincal and specifically its ushnu to consolidate their power in search of a rehabilitation of indigenous rights pointing out the importance of the Inca ushnu in the local ideology even two centuries after the fall of the Inca empire.

=== The kallankas ===
At El Shincal site, Raffino's team unearthed 5 kallanka-type structures and proceeded to conduct a meticulous archaeological survey. The excavations took place inside and around kallanka 1, which is located north of the west side of the haukaypata (see map above). It has a rectangular shape, measuring 33 by 5.60 metres (108.3 by 18.4 ft). It features double walls, formed by polyhedral stone blocks; the interior floor was made of rubble and fired clay. The gabled thatched roof was supported by a wooden framework.

Domestic and artisanal activities took place there during the Inca period: seed of various plants used for food preparation were recovered together with remains of native animals: llamas, alpacas, armadillos, hares, and other smaller species. It is also evident that ceramic pieces were manufactured at this site. This implies that the kallanka was dedicated to the development of various activities, in addition to its function as a storage area for food and raw materials.

Kallankas 3 and 4 (see map above) are located symmetrically to kallanka 1 on the east side of the haukaypata and are smaller. kallanka 2 is located on the south side inside the haukaypata and is the largest, measuring 47 by 11 metres (154 by 36 ft) and, according to Santiago Agurto, ranking as the 6th largest kallanka by surface in the Inca empire. Kallanka 5 is placed just south of kallanka 1

=== Qolqas ===
More than fifty storage units or deposits called qullqas or qolqas have been recorded, scattered in two large groups located in areas with a warm, dry microclimate. Several rocks with grinding structures for preparing food and beverages have also been found, as well as channels that supplied water from the Quimivil River.

=== Etymology ===
The name of the site El Shincal comes from shinki or shinqui (Mimosa farinose), a shrub of the fabaceae family predominant in the region. Thus, Shinkal would translate as “place where the shinki abounds.” In the vernacular of this region, however, “shinki” is specifically associated with the cardon cactus. The name Shinkal de Quimivil refers to the river of the same name. “Quimivil” derives from the ancient Cacán language, where “quimilo” means cardon cactus and “vil” means place, therefore meaning “place of the quimilos.”

== Site Museum ==
A modern site museum is found at El Shincal, which also functions as an interpretation center. It serves as a reception area for visitors, providing information and guidance. The Museum approach is based on its heritage function and an interpretive communication objective: that is, to enable visitors to understand a story told with a beginning, middle, and end, through a museum narrative that integrates research, conservation, exhibition, and communication.

== Gallery ==
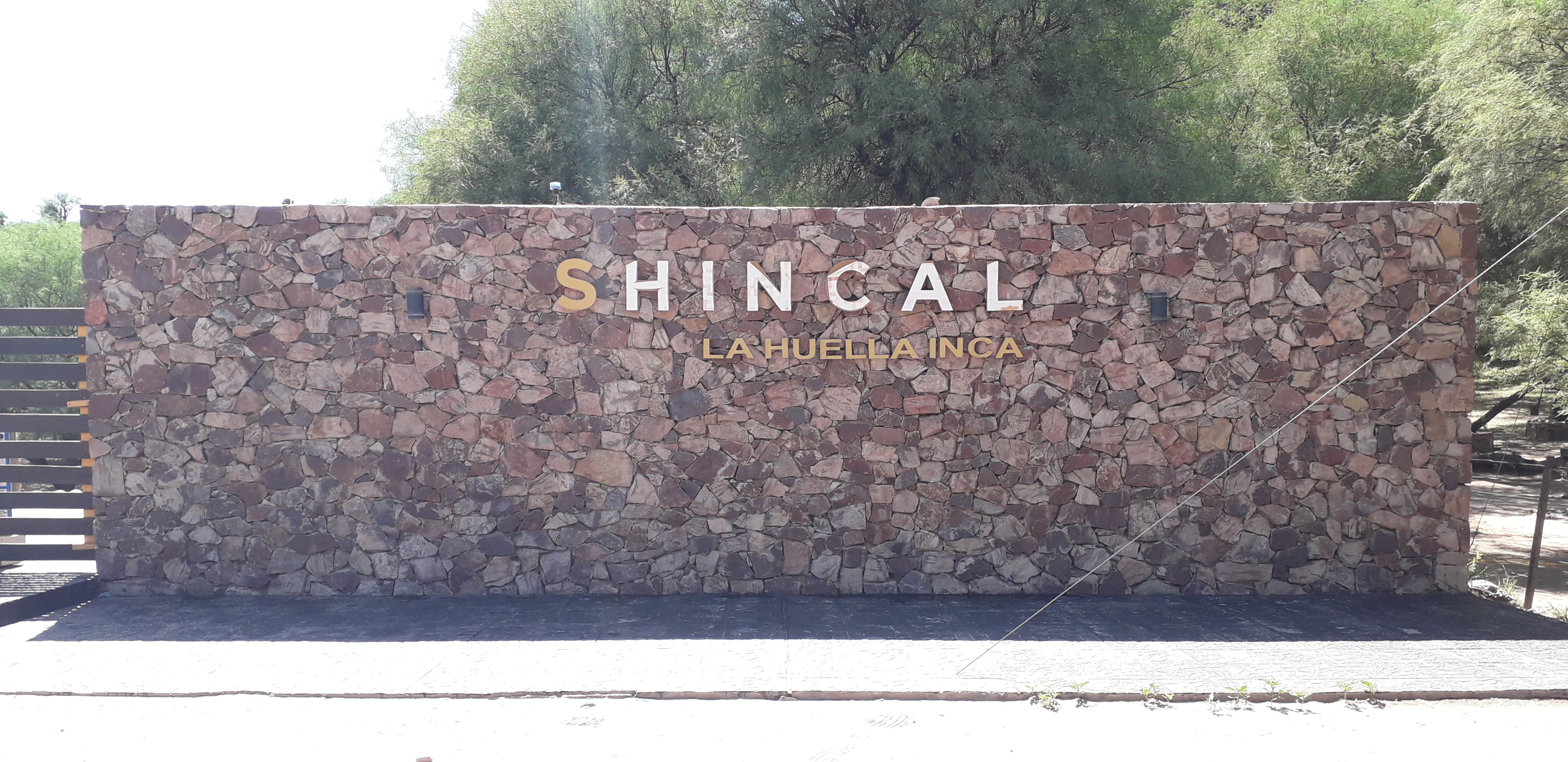
Current entrance to the archaeological site

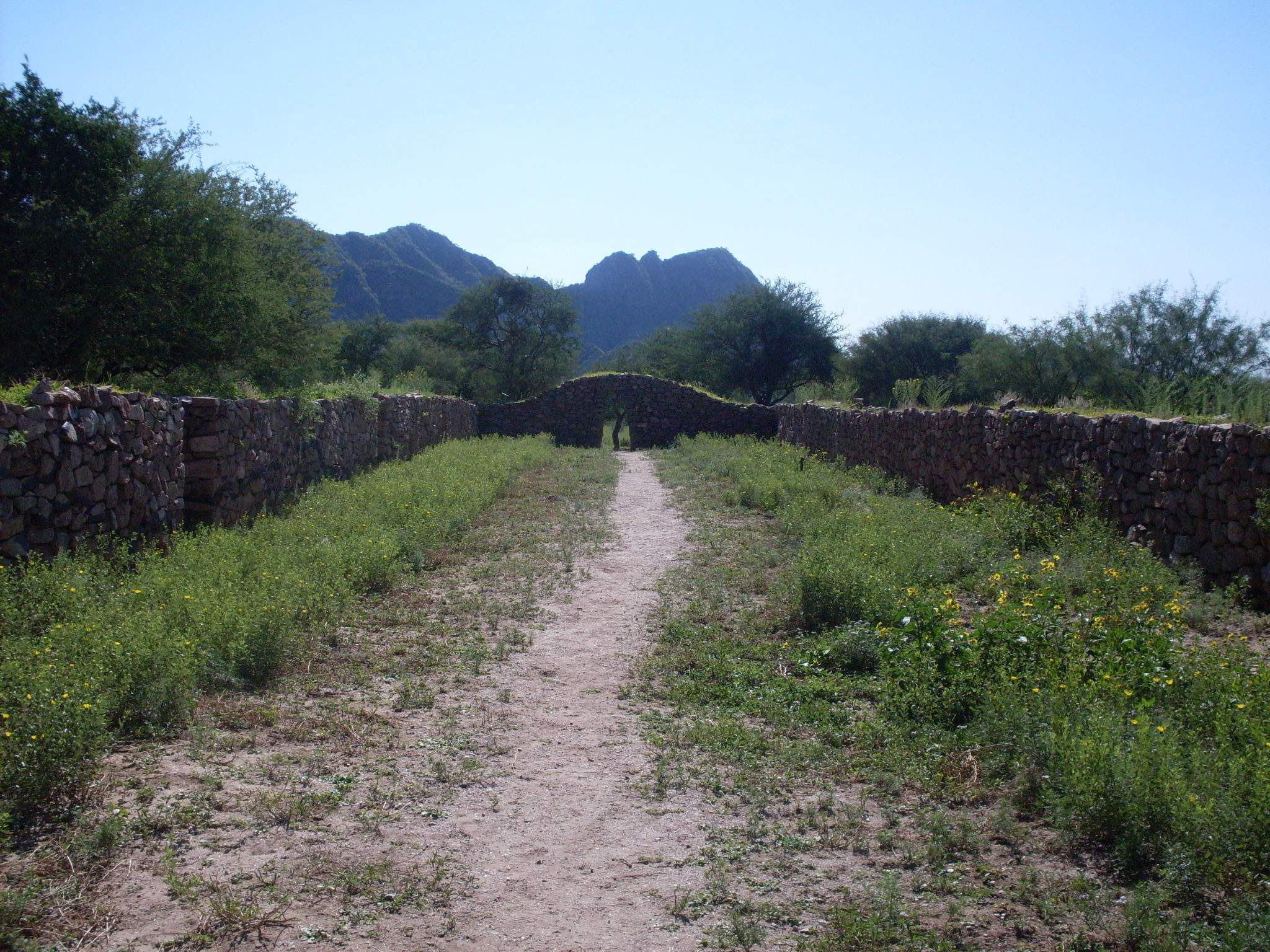
Interior of the kallanca 2

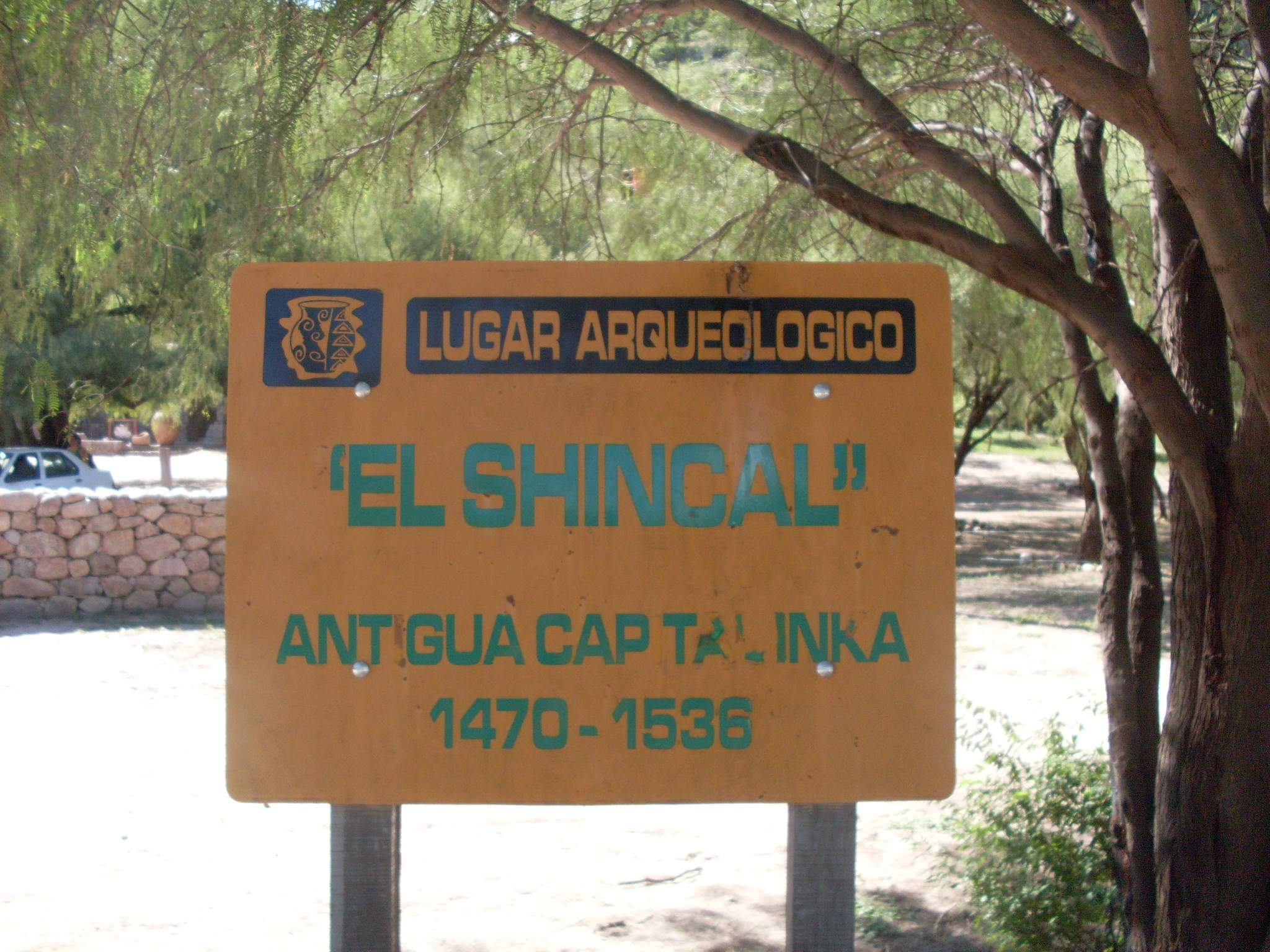
Entry to the site

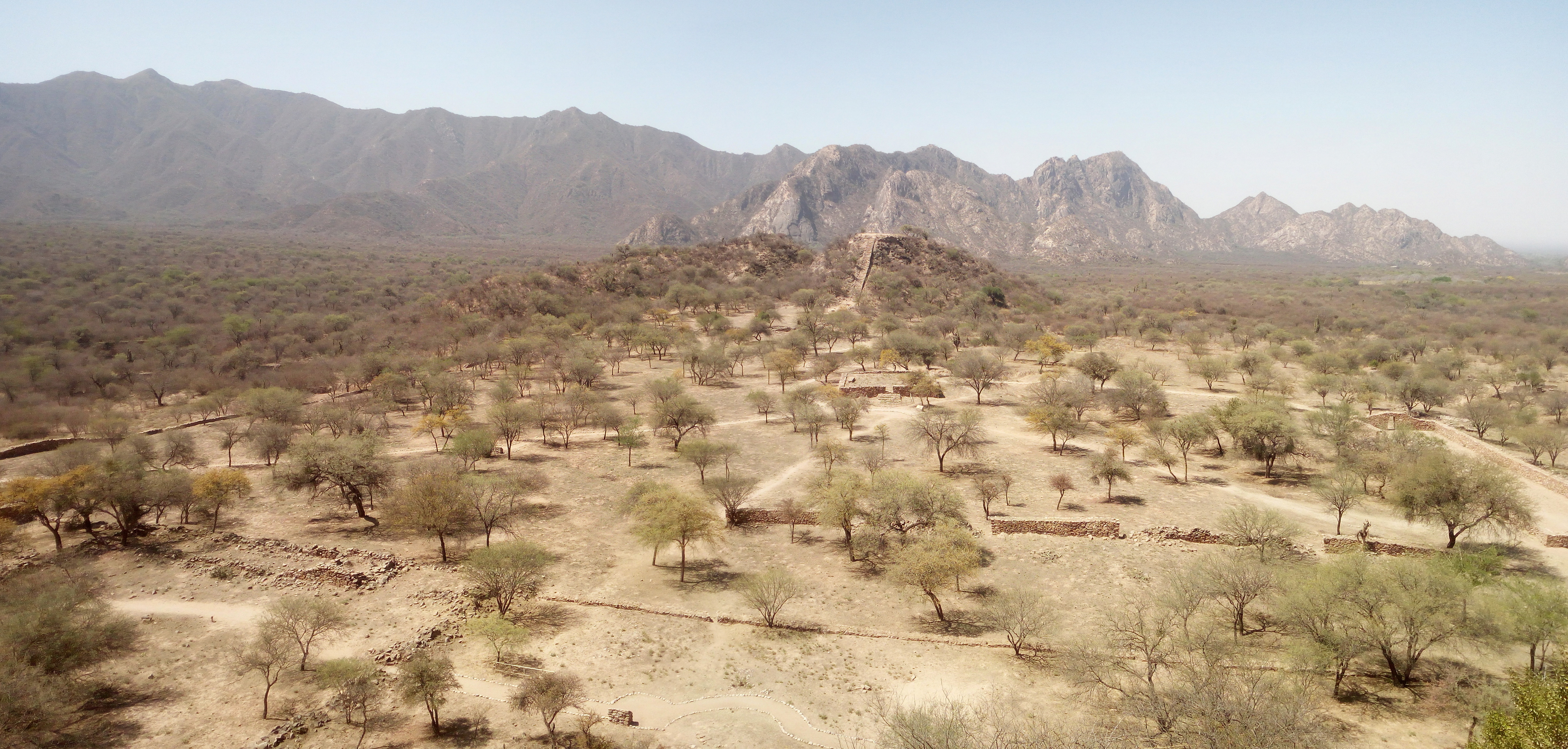
El Shincal seen from the top of the flattened western hill

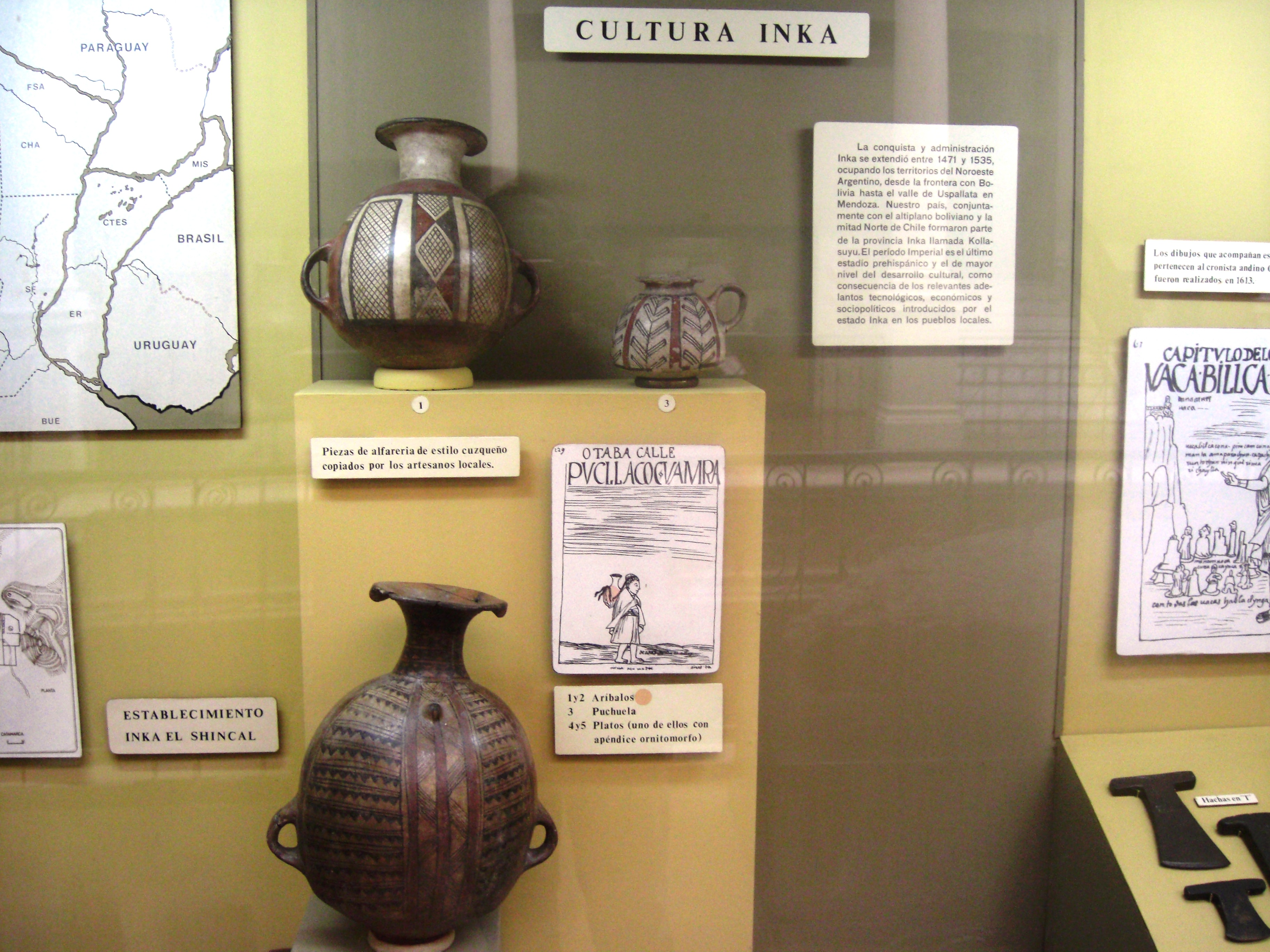
Ceramics from the Shincal Inca culture, shown in the site museum
