= Barranca Larga =

Coordinates: 26°59′10″S 66°44′00″W

- Municipality and village
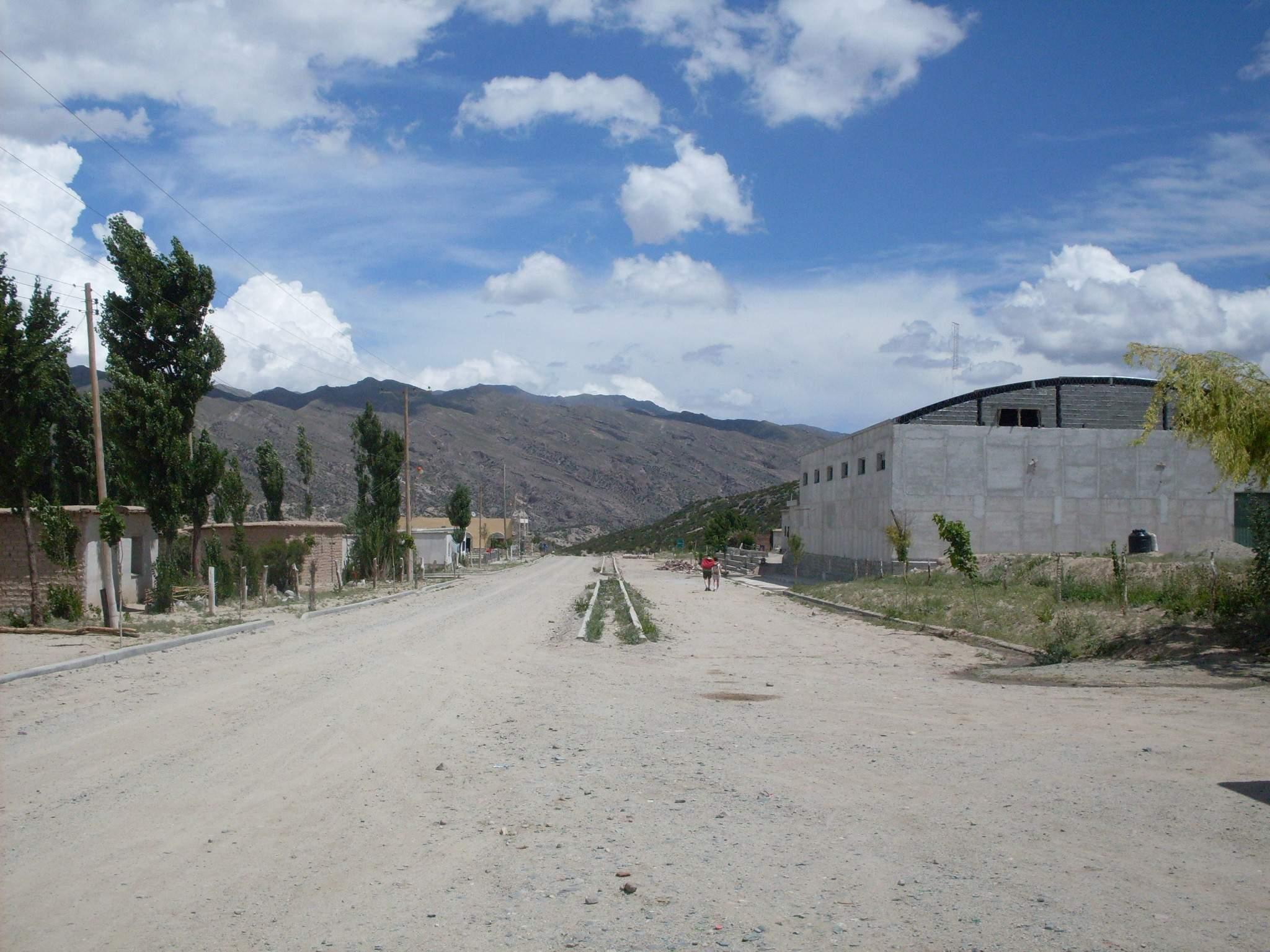
- Interactive map of Barranca Larga
- Country: Argentina
- Province: Catamarca Province
- Department: Belén Department

Population (2001)
  - Total: 314
- Time zone: UTC−3 (ART)
- Postcode: K4751
- Area code: 03835

Barranca Larga (Long Canyon) is a village and municipality within the Belén Department of Catamarca Province in northwestern Argentina.
