= Londres, Catamarca =

Londres
- Town
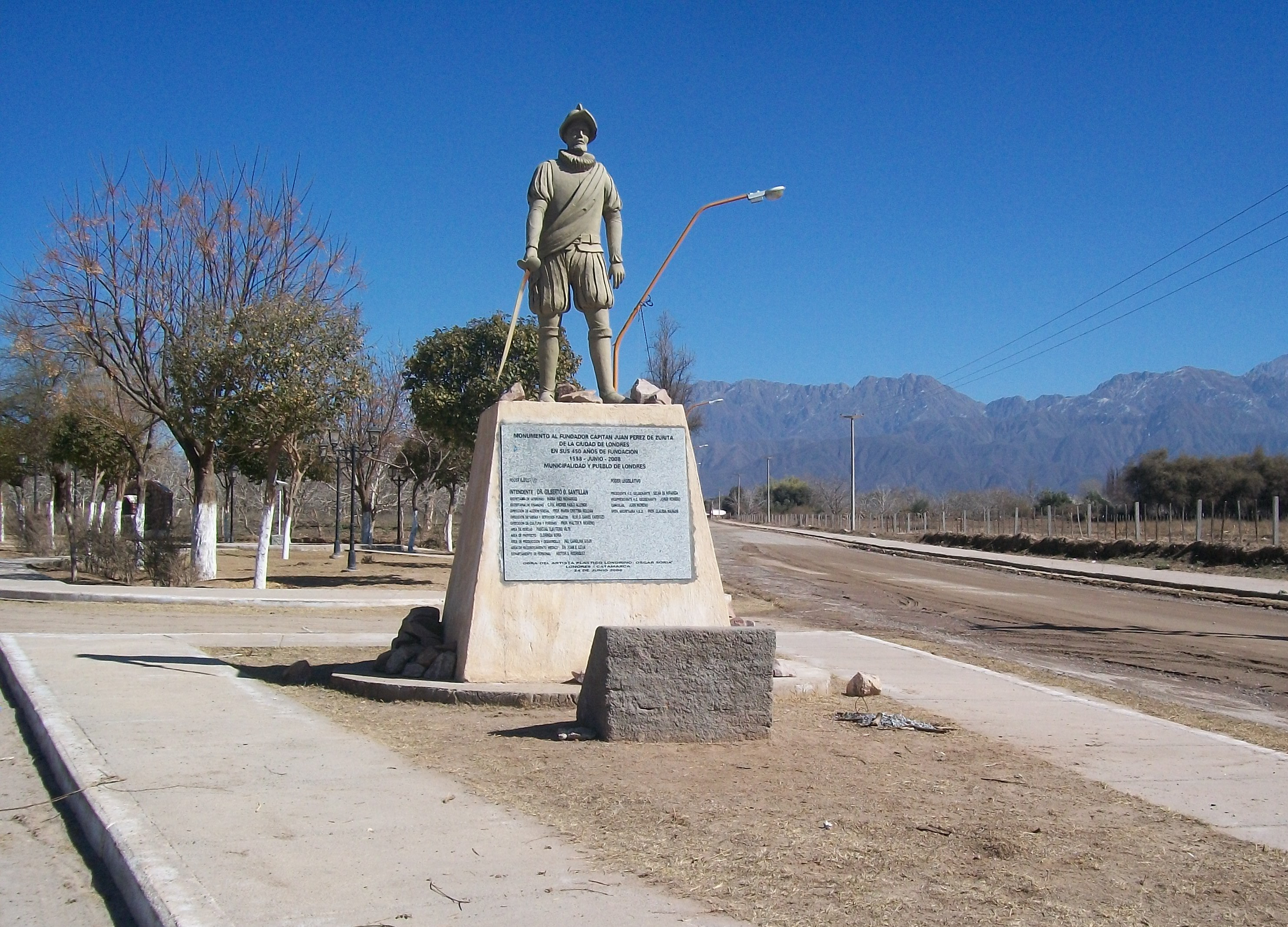

- Location of Londres in Argentina
- Coordinates: 27°43′00″S 67°07′00″W
- Country: Argentina
- Province: Catamarca
- Department: Belén

Government
  - Mayor: Gilberto Santillán (FdT)
- Elevation: 1,184 m (3,885 ft)

Population (2001)
  - Total: 2,134
- Demonym: londrino
- Time zone: UTC−3 (ART)
- CPA base: K4753
- Dialing code: +54 03835

Londres is a small tourist town in the Belén Department of Catamarca Province, Argentina. It is situated at 1,170 m (3,839 ft) above sea level alongside the Ruta Nacional 40. It is at the foot of Shincal mountains, near the Quimivil river and is traditionally divided into two parts "Arriba" (Spanish for Upper) and "Abajo" (for Lower), divided by the "Hondo" River.

== History and naming ==
Londres was founded in 1558 and named Londres de la Nueva Inglaterra (Spanish for London of the New England) in honor of the fact that Philip II, King of Spain at time of its founding, was married to Mary Tudor (Mary I of England).

== Tourism ==
The Church of the Immaculate Conception, National Historical Monument is in Londres.

The ruins of the Shincal de Quimivil are located 5 kilometres (3.1 mi) from Londres. These are 30 hectares where reconstructions of parts of an urban settlement inhabited by the indigenous population of the area in the 15th and 16th centuries.

This city, known as "The birthplace of the nut" is home to the provincial nut festival, celebrated every year in January.

== Population ==
The 2001 census records a population of 2,134 inhabitants (INDEC 2001) which represents an increase of 15.7% over the 1,844 inhabitants recorded in the previous census (INDEC 1991)
