= El Eje =

Coordinates: 27°19′S 66°53′W

El Eje (Catamarca)
- Municipality and village
- Interactive map of El Eje (Catamarca)
- Country: Argentina
- Province: Catamarca Province
- Time zone: UTC−3 (ART)

El Eje is a village and municipality in Catamarca Province, Belén Department, in northwestern Argentina.
