= Ushnu =

Inca architectural object

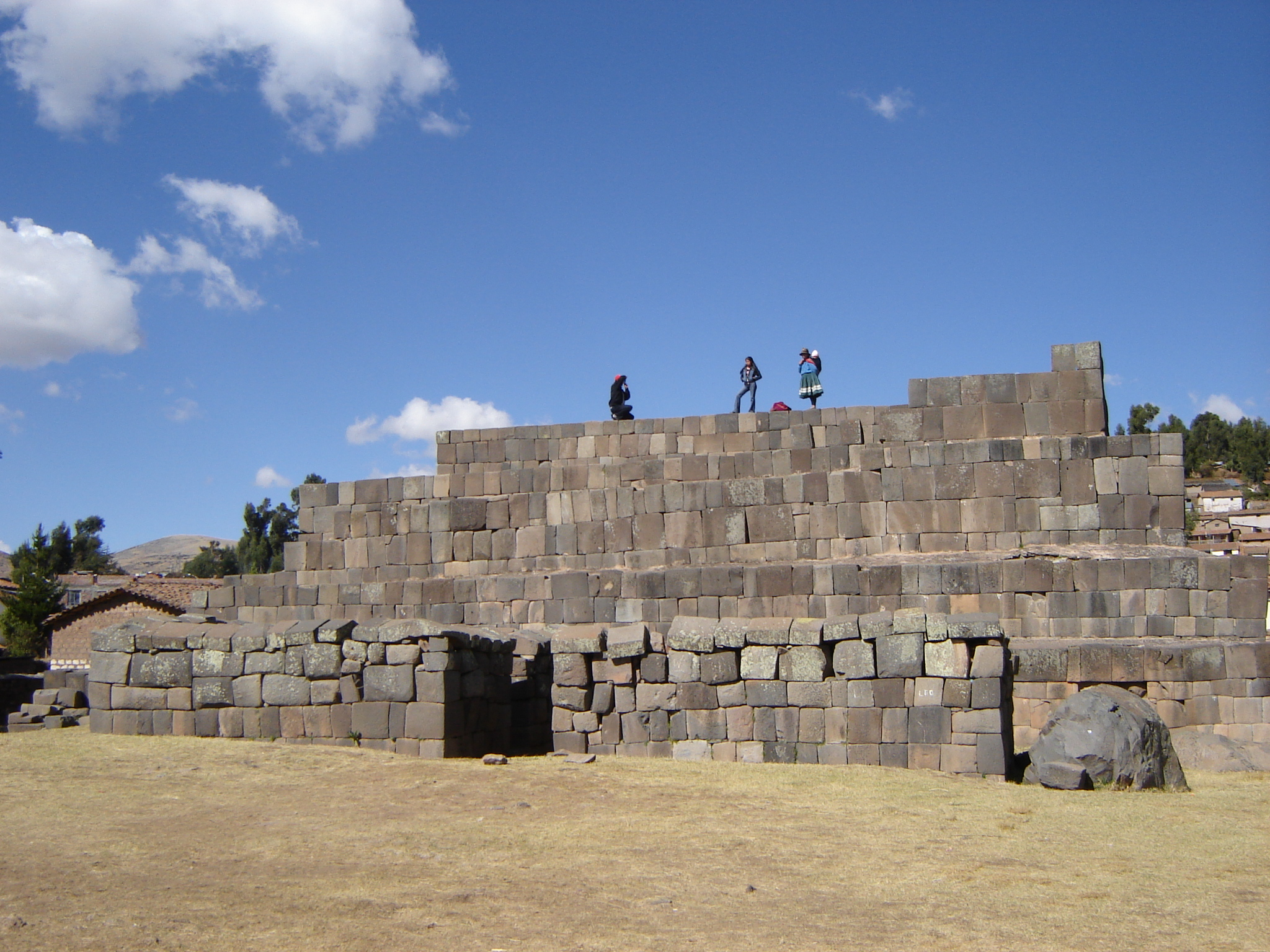
Ushnu in Vilcashuamán, Ayacucho, Peru.

In the Inca Empire the ushnu (other spelling usnu, sometimes usñu) was an altar for cults to the deities, a throne for the Sapa Inca (emperor), an elevated place for judgment and a reviewing stand of military command. In several cases the ushnu may have been used as a solar observatory. Ushnus mark the center of plazas (main squares) of the Inca administrative centers all along the highland path of the Inca road system.

The ushnu had also the function of a basin with a drain for libations. During the most important Inca festivals such as the Situa in Cusco, the capital of the Inca empire, the emperor poured chicha (fermented maize beverage) into the top basin as an offer to his father the Sun god and those who attended the ceremonies could drink it at a lower outlet. Sacrifices were also held in proximity of or at the ushnu. While in the capital the ushnu was the axis of the Inca ceremonies, in the provinces of the empire they represented the central power and had a public role and were generally quite large structures, bigger than the ushnu in Cusco.

The shape of the ushnu varied in the vast extension of the Inca conquered territory. The one in Cusco, considered to be the center of the whole empire, was a sugarloaf-shaped stone pillar, covered with gold. In the administrative centers, the ushnus had the shape of elevated platforms or truncated pyramids with one or more superposed platforms and a stairway climbing to the top. Some ushnus, which have been the object of archaeological excavations, showed the existence of basins with drainage systems.

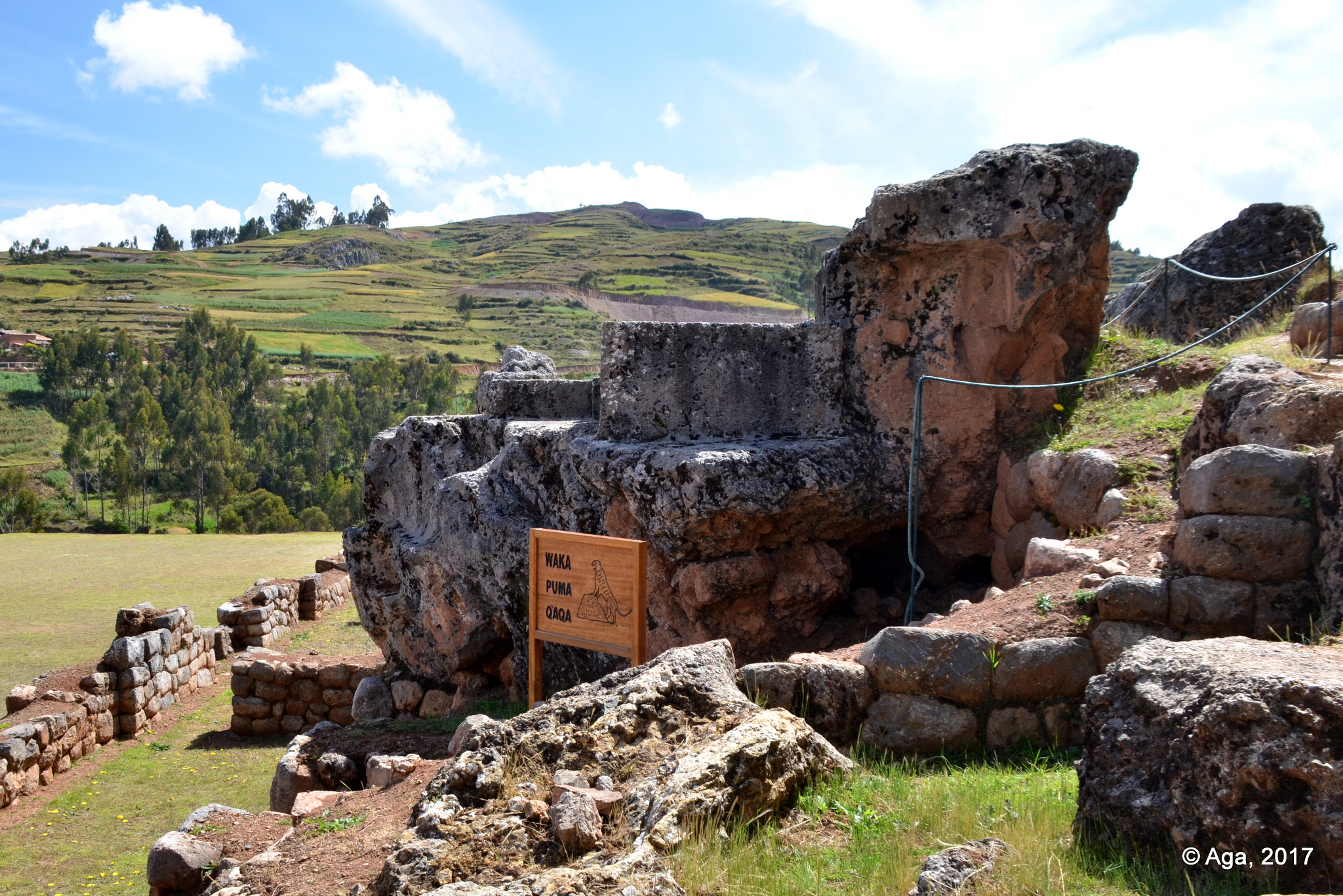
The Pumaqaqa carved stone in Chinchero was an elevated throne and ushnu standing on the side of the plaza

It has been suggested by some scholars that Intihuatanas (solar observatories), such as those found in Inca royal estates of Pisac and Tipón, and carved stones in Machu Picchu (Funerary stone), Chincero (PumaQaqa) and Sacsayhuamán (Throne of the Inca) could have been ushnus, due their use as seats and altars for religious cults.

As a social marker the ushnu provided an elevated position for the high level Inca nobility while common and non-Inca people stayed in a lower position in the plaza.

Notable ushnus are found in Vilcashuamán, Huánuco Pampa, Chinchero the three of them in Peru and Samaipata in Bolivia and Shincal de Quimivil in northern Argentina.

== History ==
Pachacuti Inca ordered that a great many goods be sacrificed to the huacas [shrines] and the houses of the Sun, the Temple of the Sun, Coricancha. He also directed that there be a throne and seat of the Incas called usno in each uamani [district]

— Guamán Poma de Ayala, "Primer nueva corónica y buen gobierno" (1615)

The truncated pyramids and the circular pillar with a basin−pit system found during the archaeological surveys in Caral date back to the Andean preceramic period (8000 to 1800 BCE) and represent mountain and water cult symbols. After passing through the Chavín culture in the Early Horizon (1000 to 200 BCE) and the Tiwanaku culture in the Middle Horizon (600 to 1000 CE) they might have become the Inca ushnu. According to the chronicle of Guamán Poma de Ayala it was the Inca emperor Pachacuti Inca Yupanquy (before 1438 – 1471) who ordered the construction of a throne for him in every district of his empire.

Ushnus are mentioned by the chroniclers who described the Inca empire in the 16th century, among them Francisco Xerez, Pedro Cieza de León, Felipe Guamán Poma de Ayala and Juan de Betanzos.

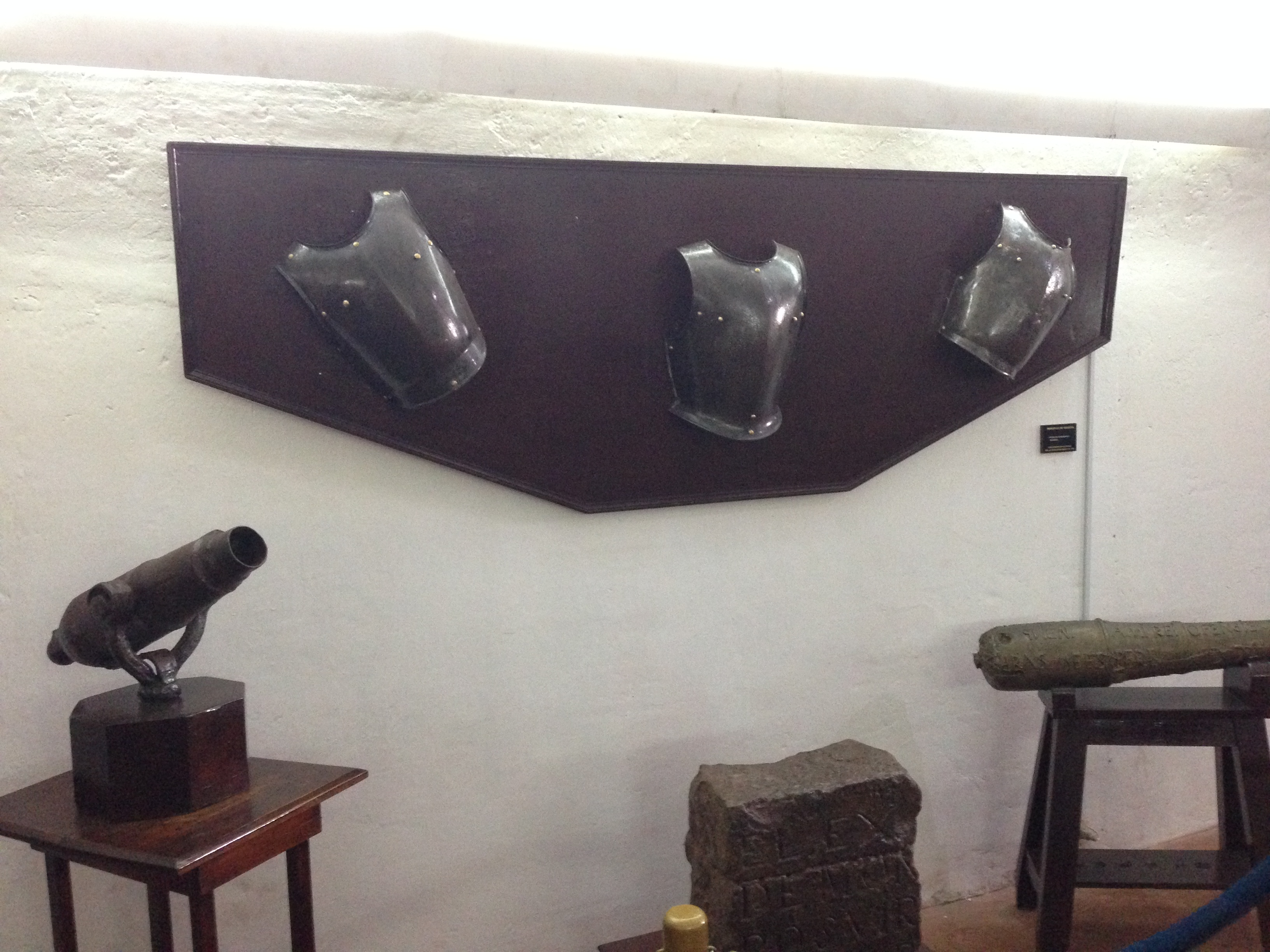
On the left hand side one of the four Pizarro's cannons used against the Inca army in 1532, Museo militar del Real Felipe - Callao - Lima

According to the chronicle of Francisco de Xerez in 1532 Francisco Pizarro, reached Cajamarca, where the Inca emperor Atahualpa was quartered with his troops. There, in the middle of the city plaza (main square), Pizarro saw what he called a fortress. He climbed it and could spot a multitude of Incan soldier in the fields, thus he ordered his four small cannons to be hidden on the top of the fortress to get ready for the attack. Then an Indian (native American) came, in the name of Atahualpa, telling the Spanish soldiers to settle where they wished except at the fortress, which was their sacred ushnu. They disobeyed and the first shots to the Inca's men, that started the Battle of Cajamarca, were shot from the top of the ushnu. Unfortunately that ushnu no longer exists.

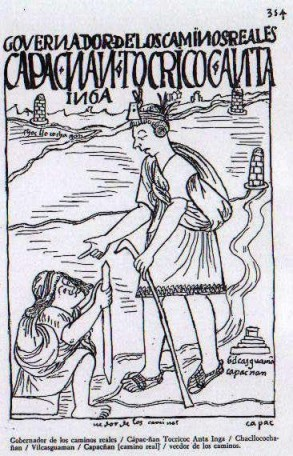
The manager of the Inca roads. In the lower right corner of the drawing the ushnu of Vilcashuamán along the Qhapaq Ñan (spelt Bilcas Guaman capac nan)

The earliest depictions of ushnus are found in the drawing by Guamán Poma de Ayala (1615) at folios 240, 242, 386 and 400. They are found in Cajamarca, Cusco and Vilcashuamán and he calls them usno while representing them as truncated step pyramids.

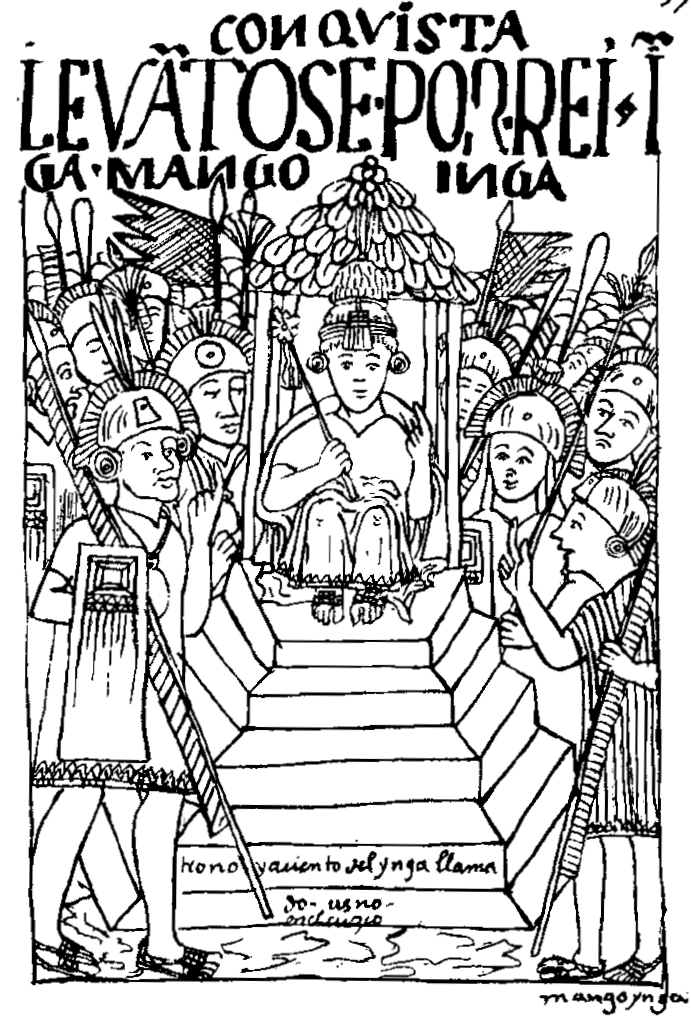
Manco Inca sitting in his throne /ushnu in Cajamarca, folio 400

Other images of ushnu platforms are found in the drawings and books by 19th century explorers such as Léonce Angrand (1874) Ephraim George Squier (1877), and Charles Wiener (1880).

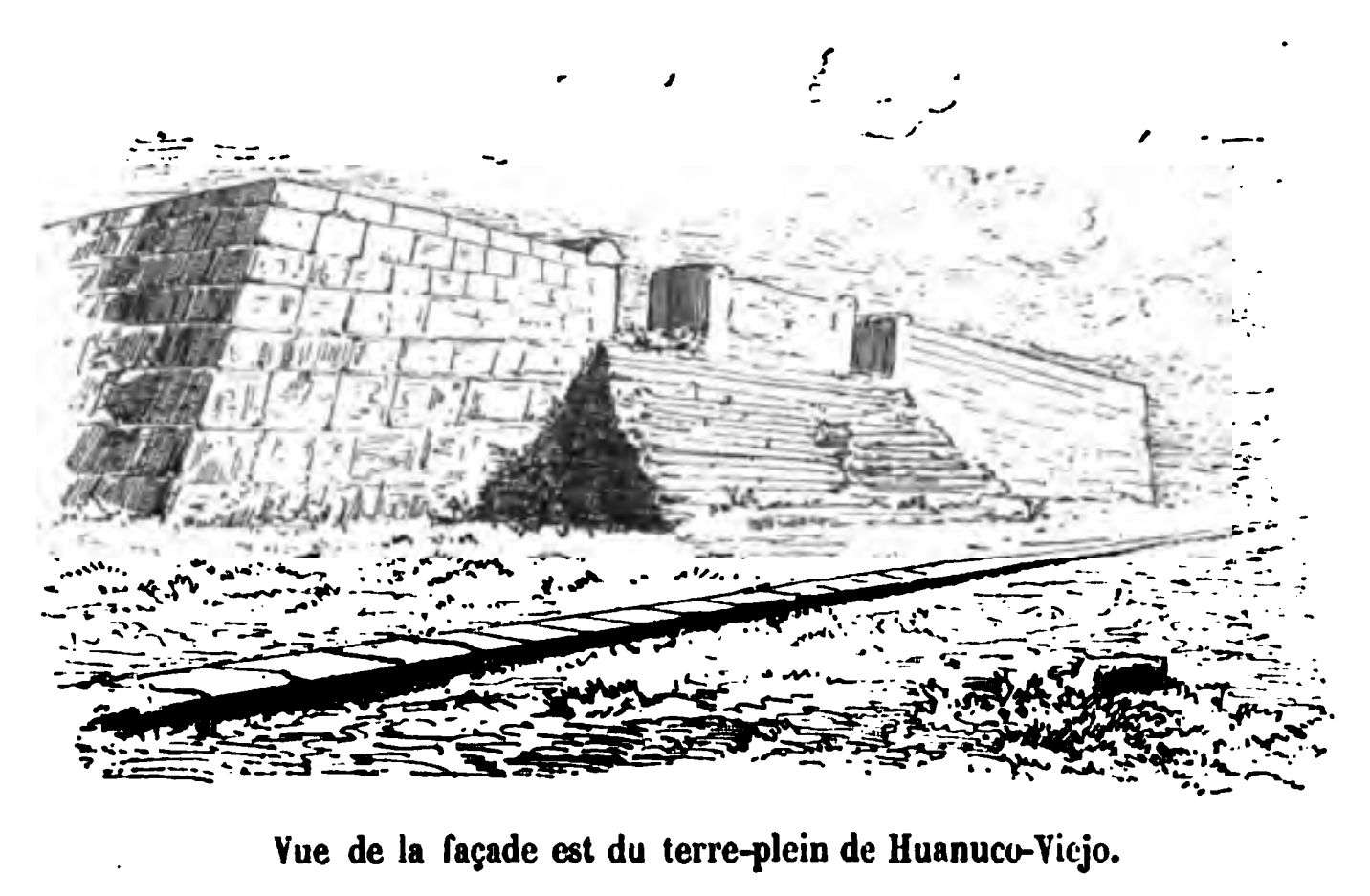
Ushnu of Huanuco Viejo (Húanuco Pampa) by Charles Wiener (1880)

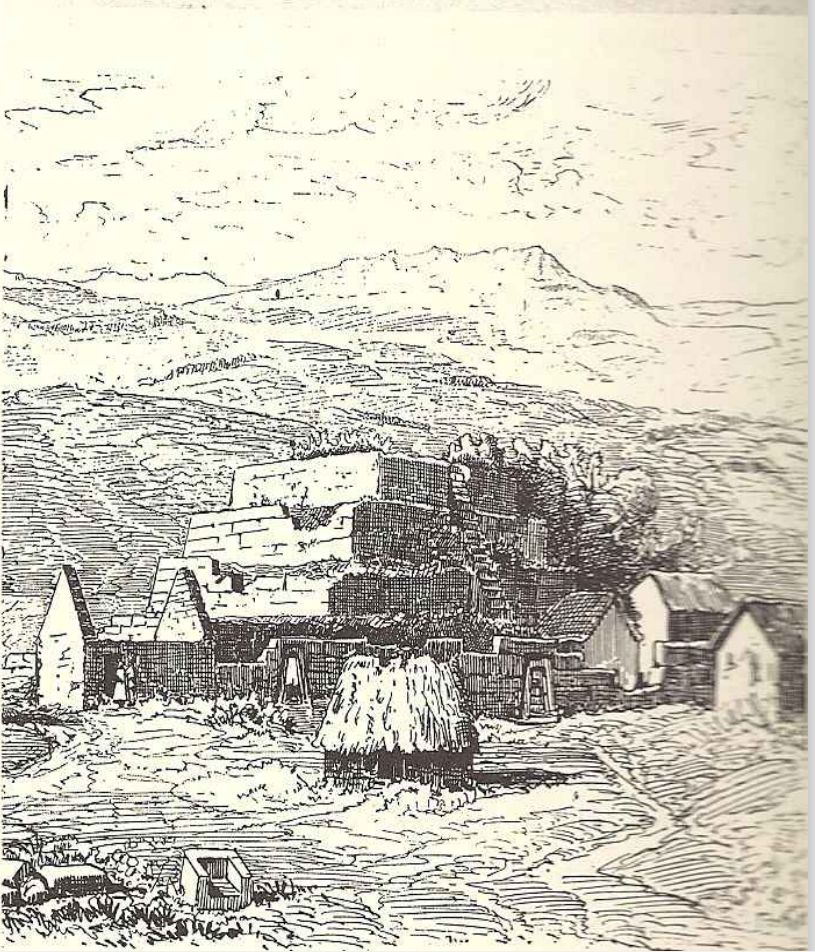
Ushnu of Vilcashuamán by Léonce Angrand (1847)

== Origin of the name ==
Little is known of the Quechua root of the term ushnu. The Quechua−Spanish dictionaries were produced since a few years after the conquest by the Spaniards and they include the word ushnu although written with obsolete spelling.

- The first of them was produced by Domingo de Santo Tomás in 1560. It includes the term ozño with the meaning of «altar for sacrifices where they sacrifice»
- The dictionary by Diego González Holguín was published in 1609 and gives the translation of vsnu (u and v were written with the same character) in two different ways, underlining two possible uses: «Judge's Court [made of] stone stuck in the ground» and «Cairn when it is a large stuck stone»
- In 1612 the Aymara dictionary by Ludovico Bertonio describes the tern hushnu as «an altar as it is seen in the punas»
- The priest Cristóbal de Albornoz at the end of the 16th century in his instructions for discovering idolatry describes the ushnu as follows: «there is another waka (sacred place/shrine) called usno on royal roads and in the squares of the settlements»
- According to Catherine Allen, professor emeritus of Anthropology at the George Washington University and to R. Tom Zuidema, late anthropologist at the University of Illinois at Urbana-Champaign, the current use of the Quechua word usnu seems to be related to the word suck, chupar in Spanish.
- Pino Matos, Peruvian archaeologist, states that in the Department of Ancash the contemporary word ushnu refers to «a place made of stones where water can filter» to the ground. This meaning was then extended to «a place where liquids were offered or place of libations».
- Moreover, Pino Matos states that the name ushnu was first proposed in 1965 by the Peruvian anthropologist Manuel Chávez Ballón during a project carried out by the Institute of Andean Research and directed by John Victor Murra. He suggested that the ceremonial platform in the center of the Huánuco Pampa plaza had to be called ushnu according to the local Quechua pronunciation. Then starting from the 1970s the term was currently used by the archaeologist to name altars and platforms existing in the Inca settlements.

The ushnu existing in Cusco used to be a place of ceremonial offers, where the liquid poured as an offer into an upper container could drain down to avoid spilling: this way the deity to whom the liquids were offered appeared to be drinking. When the ushnus were built in the new conquered areas, where they adopted the physical form of platforms or pyramids, a drainage was emplaced together with a stairway and in some cases a seat on the top.

== Uses of the ushnu ==
The usnu embodies the notion of a sacred central space. […] It was at the usnu in Cuzco […] that the Inca king conducted the solemn state religious rituals designed to maintain cosmic order and social stability.

— Meddens, McEwan, and Vivanco, " Inca "Stone Ancestors" in context at a high-altitude usnu platform (2010)

The different uses of the ushnus can be summarized as follows

| Activity carried out at the ushnu | Author / references |
|---|---|
| Military use, stone of war. The Inca / captains stood at the troop review. Empowerment of chiefs for the war | Pedro Cieza de León; Jessica Joyce Christie; Guamán Poma de Ayala; Gasparini & Margolies. |
| Military field use. Observation of troops in the field | Juan de Santa Cruz Pachacuti Yamqui Salcamaygua. |
| Justice. Issue of judgments | Gonzales Holguín. |
| Justice and politics. The Inca and his province chiefs discussed politics and justice for the empire | John Hislop. |
| Ceremonies for fertility of the earth. Offers to the Pachamama | R. Tom Zuidema. |
| Ceremonies for fertility of llama and alpaca herds | Cavero. |
| Stage for ritual performance | John Hoops. |
| Cults to the local huacas along the ceques and to protective apus | Cavero. |
| Oracles and rites of offers to deities including coca, chicha and human sacrifices (capacocha) | Jesuita Anónimo; Cristobal de Molina; Cieza de León. |
| In Cusco at the festival of purification (situa) chicha was poured in the top basin as an offer to the gods then flowed down to be drunk by people | Cristóbal de Molina; R. Tom Zuidema. |
| Astronomic observation and weather forecast through the use of a gnomon | Jesuita Anónimo; R. Tom Zuidema. |
| (In Cusco) a water gate to connect the ushnu as center of the Empire to the Sun's Coricancha | R. Tom Zuidema; Catherine Allen. |
| A gate to access to the underworld | R. Tom Zuidema. |
| In the field as mark or milestone to indicate sacred territory | Cavero. |

== Structure ==
Except the Cusco ushnu, which was never described by the chronicles as a platform, practically all the other masonry ushnus are platforms either stepped or in a truncated pyramid shape. On the contrary the natural carved stone may have very different shapes depending on the original rock outcrop, with one common point: the seat or throne on top of it. The structure of built ushnus is made of stone. Some of the masonry is well worked imperial Inca style with big blocks, but most of the ushnus have a rustic style, also known as pirca style, with pirca meaning wall in Quechua.

Different authors define the usnhu in different ways.

- Morris states «ushnus are stone buildings in the shape of a platform or truncated pyramid».
- Bauer says it is «a platform as a truncated pyramid with an access or a stairway to reach its top where a seat or a stone block may exist».
- Cavero Palomino gives a more detailed definition: «an architectural structure with rectangular plan having up to four over-posed platforms that have an access in the frontal part and had different functions according to the place in which they were built».
- Gasparini & Margolies define the ushnu form the architectural point of view as «The Usñu [their spelling] was a five-tiered pyramid or simply a rectangular elevation where the Inca —in other cases the governor—sat to govern and judge. It seems that the Usñu was the symbol of power and government of the Incas in the conquered towns»
- Last but not least Zuidema tries to provide a different view, based on the function: the ushnu «is basin or fountain associated to a gnomon which can be considered the axis mundi (axis of the Earth) for the cult of ancestors, the wakas (shrines, scared places) and other deities of the Andean cosmic world»

== World view and unification ==
For the Incas, the world was composed of three planes:

- Hanan Pacha, the world above
- Kay Pacha, the world here and
- Uku Pacha, the world of the dead and of what lies beneath the surface of the ground.

In Quechua the word pacha means both time and space. Thus the Sapa Inca or his representative, on top of the ushnu, was seating in a central position connecting all the sacred ceques directions. This represented a three-dimensional and a temporal connection between the world below and the surface, with an eye to the sky.

Hyslop states that the ushnus were a form to unite the Inca capital to the provincial and administrative centers of the empire. This strategy was working through the Capacocha ceremonies (rites that might involve also the sacrifice of children) which took place on top of or beside the ushnus and «connected the point of sacrifice with the child's origin by straight routes». There was also a desire, through these representations during the Capacocha to symbolically connect the sacred sites of the conquered territories to those properly Inca, making this celebration probably the greatest of the ceremonies performed in the Inca empire.

The ushnu as a well recognizable character of Inca architecture represented one of the main symbols of the central power in peripheral settlements and administrative centers. As a sort of theatricality of power the ushnu was intended to produce a uniform collective consciousness that allowed all person subjected to the Inca to feel connected to the astral deities and to the sacred places. This was primarily intended to ensure ideological domination over the multitudes of newly subjugated peoples in the recently conquered territories.

With reference to Huánuco Pampa, Morris observes that the Inca state architecture which imposed central plazas dominated by an ushnu «can be compared in many ways to a huge stage to be used by the state for the integration of a fragmented interior area. In addition to providing housing for people and economic activities, the architecture provided a way through which divisions and combinations could be manipulated by the Inca. In part the architectural backdrop was symbolic, but a final effect in terms of architecture is that it really can and does shape human activities and relationships».

== Notable ushnus ==
There are hundreds of ushnu in the territory of the former Inca empire, many of them have been excavated and described in archaeological publication. Several have been restored and others are being considered for further research especially under the Proyecto Qhapaq Ñan carried out by the Ministerio de Cultura (Ministry of Culture) in Peru.

=== Cusco ===
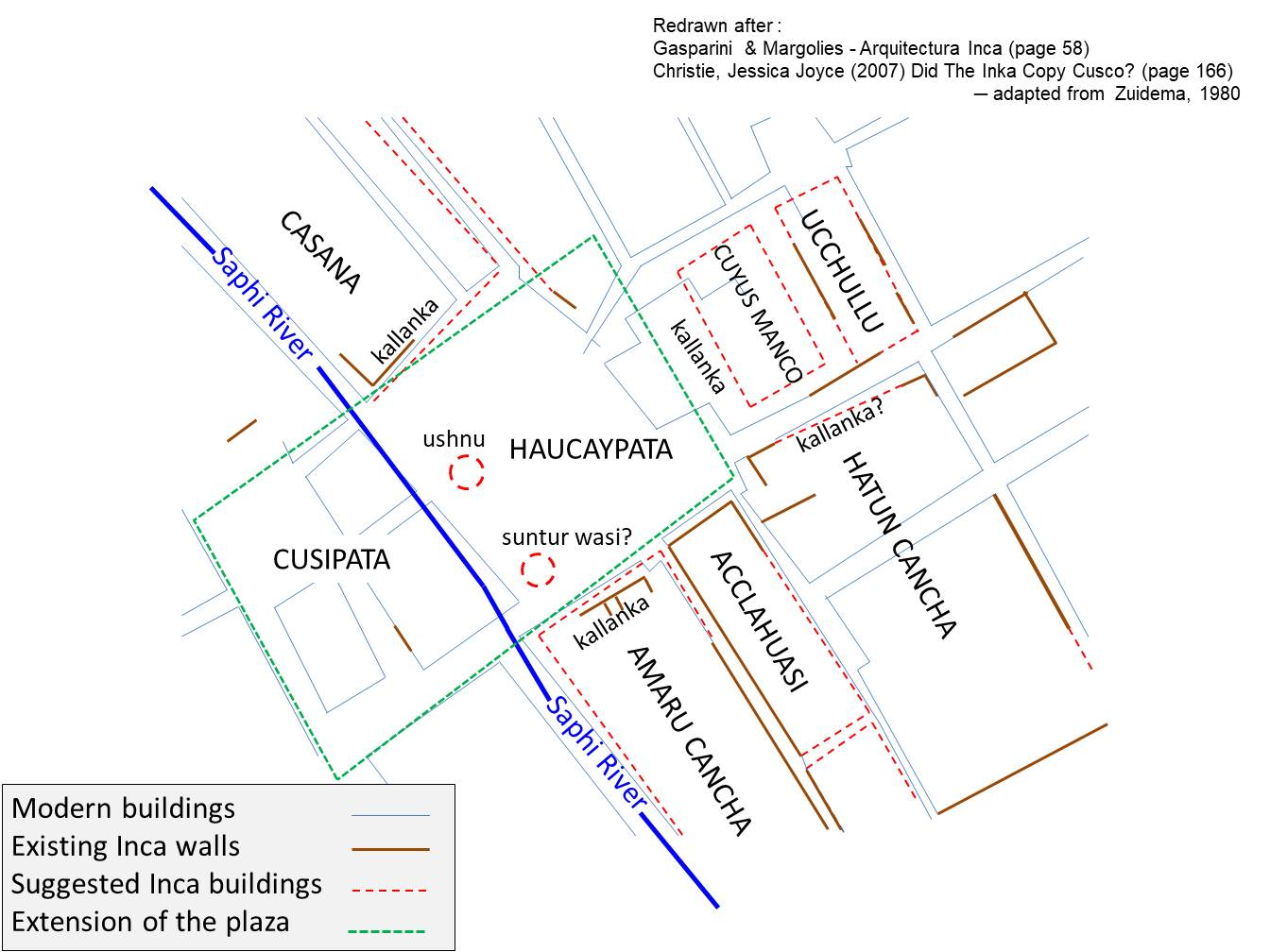
Cusco main plaza (hauycaypata) at Inca times with possible location of the ushnu

In the middle of the plaza, where the gold usño stood, it was like a well into which they poured the chicha sacrifice when they drank

— Cristobal de Molina, " Account of the Fables and Rites of the Incas " (1575)

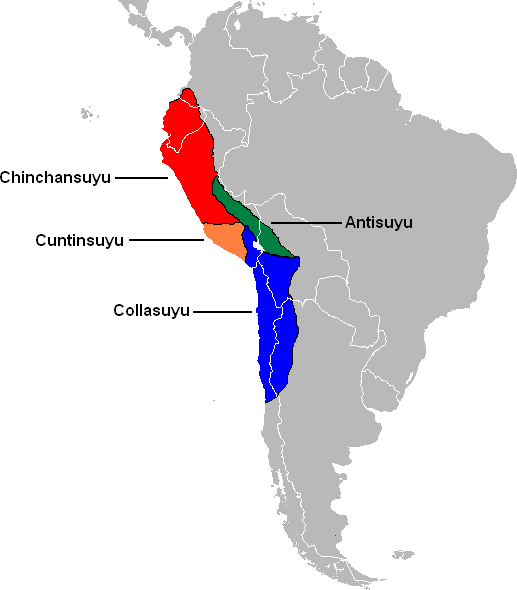
The Inca empire and its four provinces

The main square of Cusco roughly corresponding to the modern Plaza de Armas and Plaza del Regocijo was divided by the river Saphi into two sub-squares called Haucaypata (Hawkaypata) or square of the rest and happiness and Cusipata (Kusipata) or square of the joy. The river was canalized and covered to allow free transit between the two parts. This huge space marked the center and represented the power of the Empire. In fact the four roads to the four Suyus (provinces), into which the Tawantinsuyu (empire of four parts united) was divided, stemmed from this square. It was also the limit between hanan (upper) and hurin (lower) Cusco. It had an important ritual role and hosted the religious festivals held during the year.

The ushnu was indeed somewhere in the middle of this square. Nevertheless, nobody knows exactly where it stood. The description provided by the chroniclers are not consistent. Nevertheless, the scholars agree that the ushnu was most probably standing almost in its middle, on top of the canalized Saphi river. In that position it allowed a direct access to the underworld through underground waterways. This concept is underlined by Zuidema who considers the ushnu as a gate to the Earth that sucks in the rainwater and the offerings. The presence of the river just under the ushnu allowed this opening to function properly.

… in the large plaza of the city of Cuzco, there stood the stone of the war that was large, in the shape and make of a sugarloaf, well stuck and filled with gold ...

— Pedro Cieza de León, "Crónica del Perú - El señorío de los Incas" (1553)

In 1534 Pizarro, after conquering Cusco, decided to convert it into a Spanish colonial town, to this purpose he reserved areas to the east and the south of the square for the erection of the new cathedral and the Jesuits' church. The original plaza was considered too big and it was divided into two smaller spaces by a row of colonial building. On the top of the steps existing in the square he ordered a gallows to be built. These steps were most probably the foundation of the Cusco ushnu and its destruction and substitution for a gibbet was a sign of the empowerment of the new governor and of the end of the Inca sacred ceremonies.

In the 17th century the descriptions of the Cuzco ushnu differ enormously from the chronicles of the preceding century. Thus, Guamán Poma de Ayala draws the ushnu of Cuzco as superimposed platforms, like a truncated pyramid, on top of which Manco Inca Yupanqui (founder and monarch of the independent Neo-Inca State in Vilcabamba) sits. His drawing is very similar to another that he makes of the Cajamarca ushnu.

The ushnu was also an observation point of the Sun. The chroniclers report that small stone towers or pillars marked the horizon on the east and west of Cusco and the main observation point could have been the ushnu in the main square, nevertheless the solar observation could be purely ritual and not as a way to fix a date for the calendar. In this respect calculations by Zuidema show that the Sun and the Moon, in four dates every year, stand precisely at the zenith and at the nadir above and below Cusco, thus providing the ushnu with the role of the axis mundi or ritual axis of the Earth.

==== Relationship with the ceques ====
The organization of the spaces the Cuzco was based on the ceque system, whose center was the Coricancha (temple of the Sun). This system was composed of a series of ritual imaginary pathways leading outward from Cusco into the territory of the Inca Empire. All along the ceque lines huacas (shrines, sacred places) were found corresponding to spots of ceremonial, ritual, or religious significance. The system was divided into four sectors towards the four provinces which composed the Inca empire and each province had a given number of lines. The first huaca of the fifth ceque of Antisuyu was in the main square and was mentioned as usnu by Polo de Ondegardo (Spanish colonial jurist, civil servant and thinker). According to Zuidema this was associated with astronomic specific phenomena.

=== Vilcashuamán ===
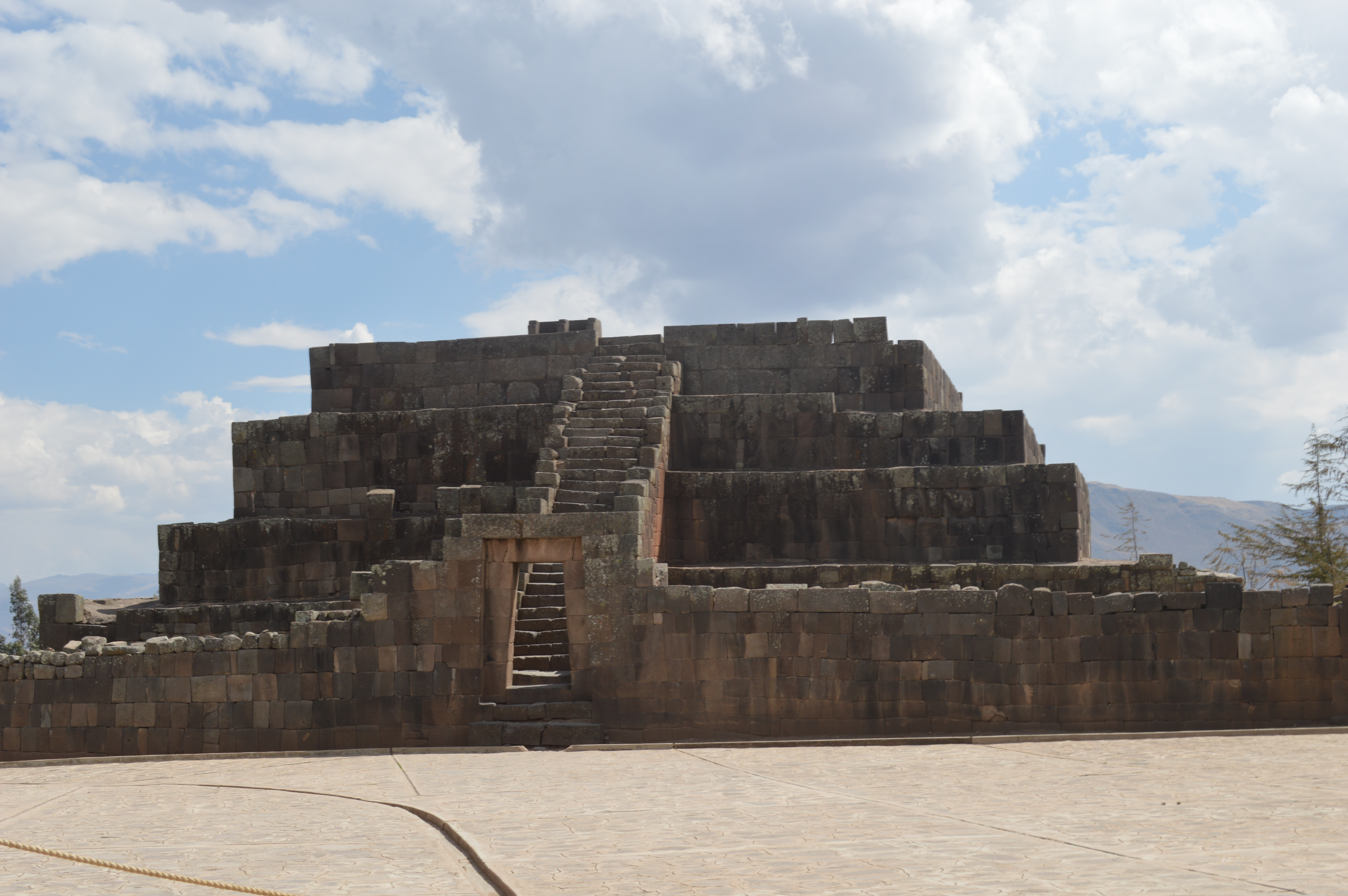
The Vilcashuamán Usnu seen form the East side with the entrance gate and the stairway

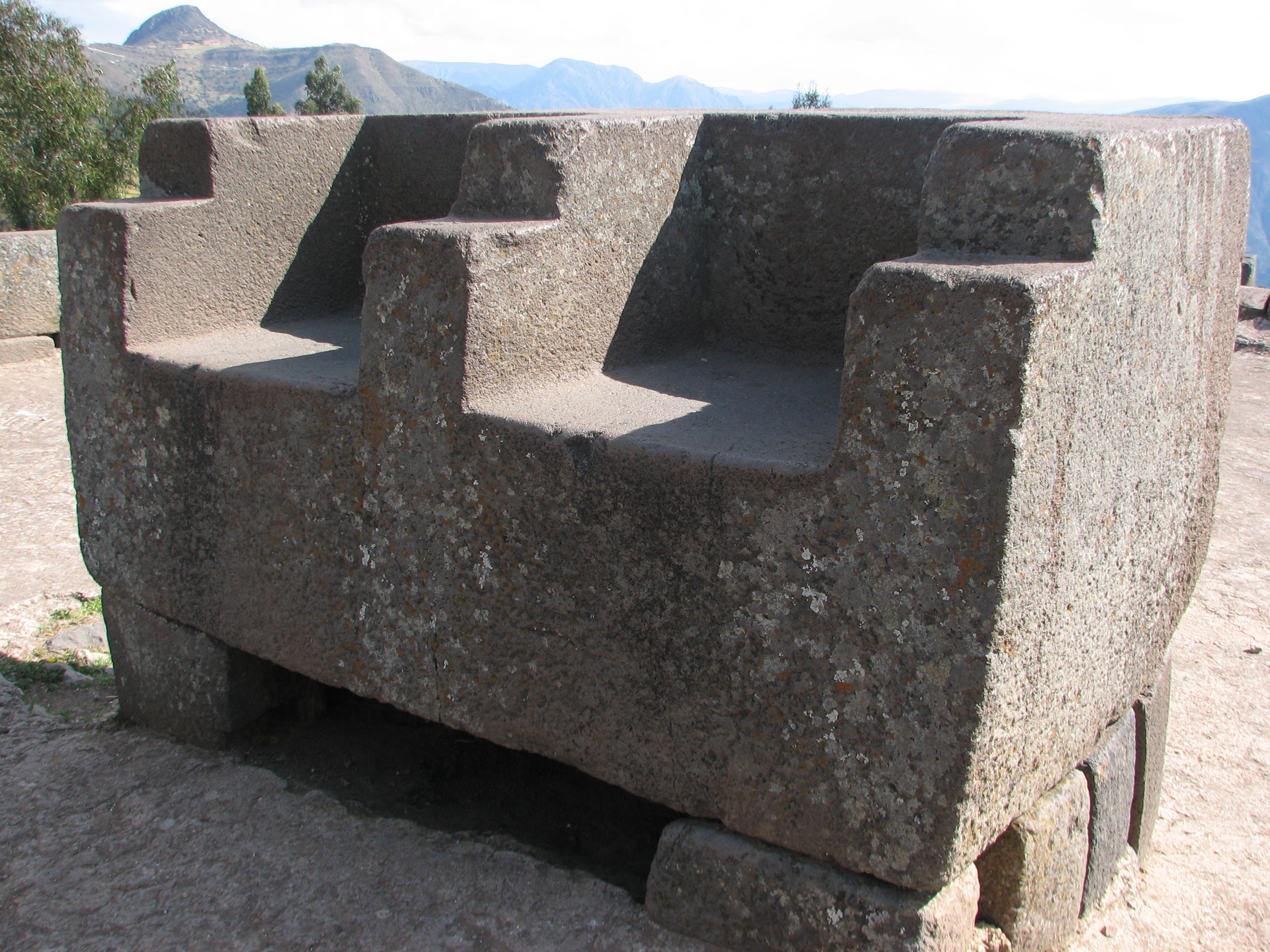
The throne on the upper platform of the Vilcashuamán Usnu

The Vilcashuamán ushnu is one of the best known and has been the object of studies and restoration. Its base is 24 by 26 metres (79 by 85 ft) and its height is 8 metres (26 ft). Being the tallest known ushnu it has 4 platforms, but observed form the west side one can see 5 platforms. According to Cavero this may be due to restoration works carried out in the past. On the East side there is a double jamb entrance gate with a stairway leading to the top where a finely carved double seat monolith is found. According to the chronicles it was used by the Inca and his colla (or qoya, the queen), to pray.

=== Huánuco Pampa ===
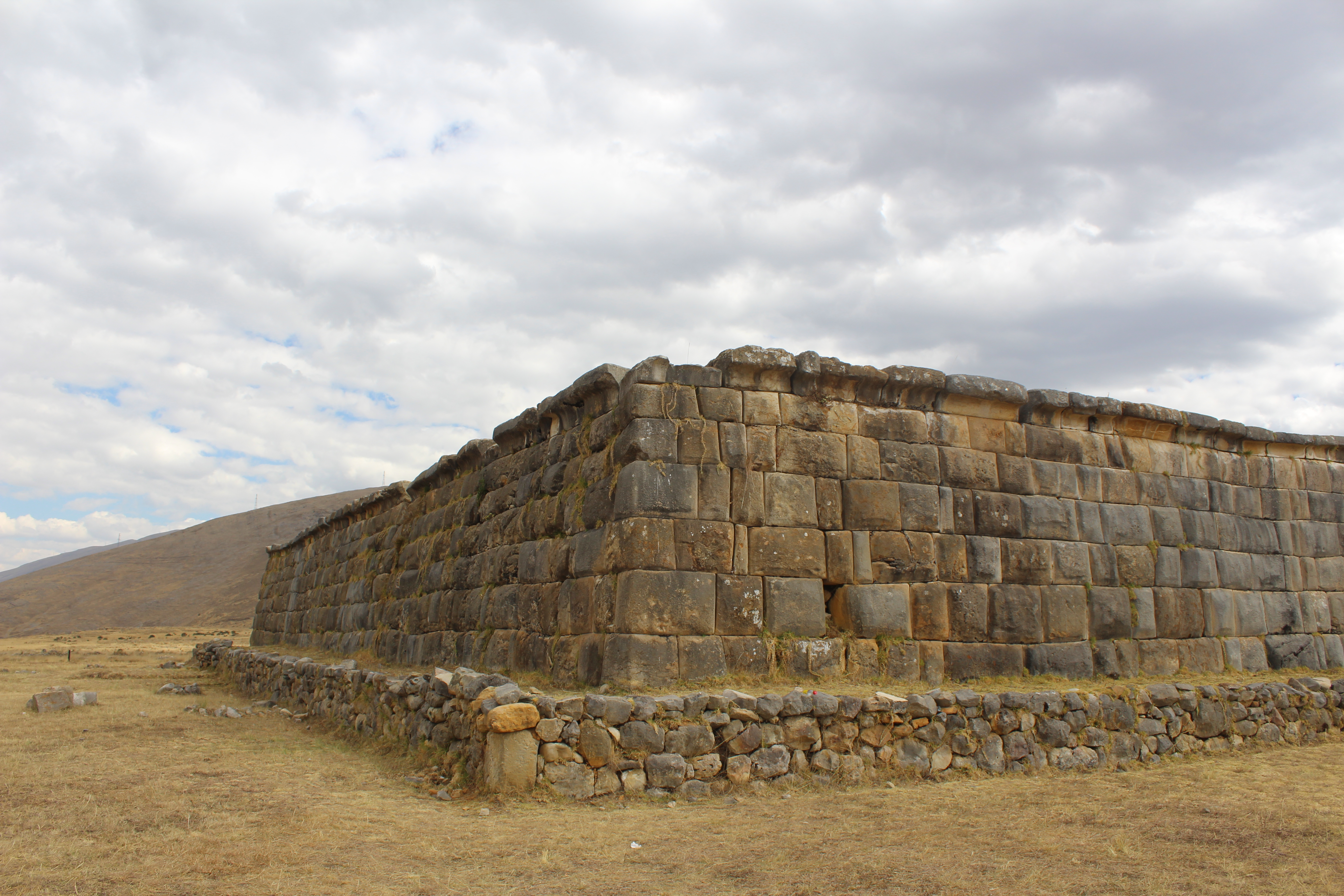
The ushnu in Huánuco Pampa - corner view

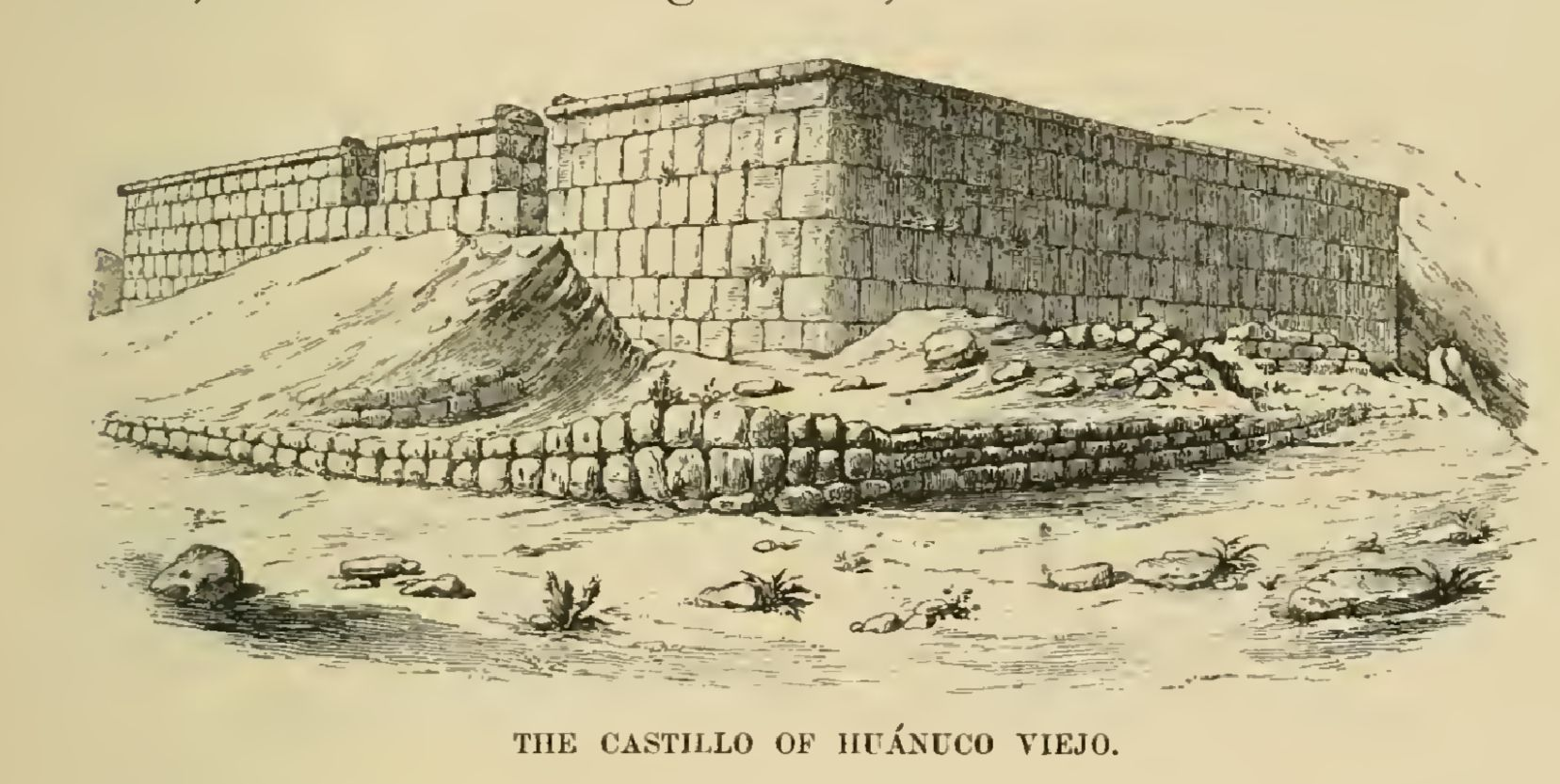
View of the ushnu in Huánuco Pampa published by E. Squier in 1877

The Huanuco Pampa plaza is a huge open space measuring 350 by 550 metres (1,150 by 1,800 ft). In its middle stands a platform built with imperial style stone masonry. It measures 38 by 63 metres (125 by 207 ft) having a height of 3.7 to 4 metres (12 to 13 ft) it is supported by a platform having a height of about 0.8 metres (2.6 ft). The base platform is built with rustic style masonry with an extension of 74 by 69 metres (243 by 226 ft). The total volume of this ushnu is approximately 6,150 cubic metres (217,000 cu ft).

The access to the top platform is through the south side where a stairway stands. It had originally 32 steps. The top platform is enclosed by a wall having a thickness of about 1 metre (3.3 ft) and a height of 1.5 metres (4.9 ft). A small outward projection from the top of the wall produces a cornice around the top of the ushnu. This enclosure leaves two entrances, each one almost 3 metres (9.8 ft) wide, that allow access from the stairway to the platform. The wall around the top of the ushnu contained 10 niches, 6 of which are still clearly visible. These niches had no toppings and could easily have served as seats.

The space corresponding to the ushnu marked the center of the settlement and was designed as the base for the construction of the entire site. The ushnu was also linked to the most notable aspects of the surrounding landscape through the lines projected towards the main directions of the settlement. Notably the southern direction of its stairway was possibly oriented to the 6,635 metres (21,768 ft) high, permanently snow-capped Yerupajá, which was a very important apu (protective deity of the mountains). The ushnu of Huánuco Pampa served as the center of the public ceremonial activities that took place during the year. The public activities that were carried out around the ushnu of Huánuco Pampa constituted, possibly, a symbolic way of rewarding the attending people through the libation rituals. It was also a sign through which alliances for state purposes with local populations were achieved.

=== Samaipata ===
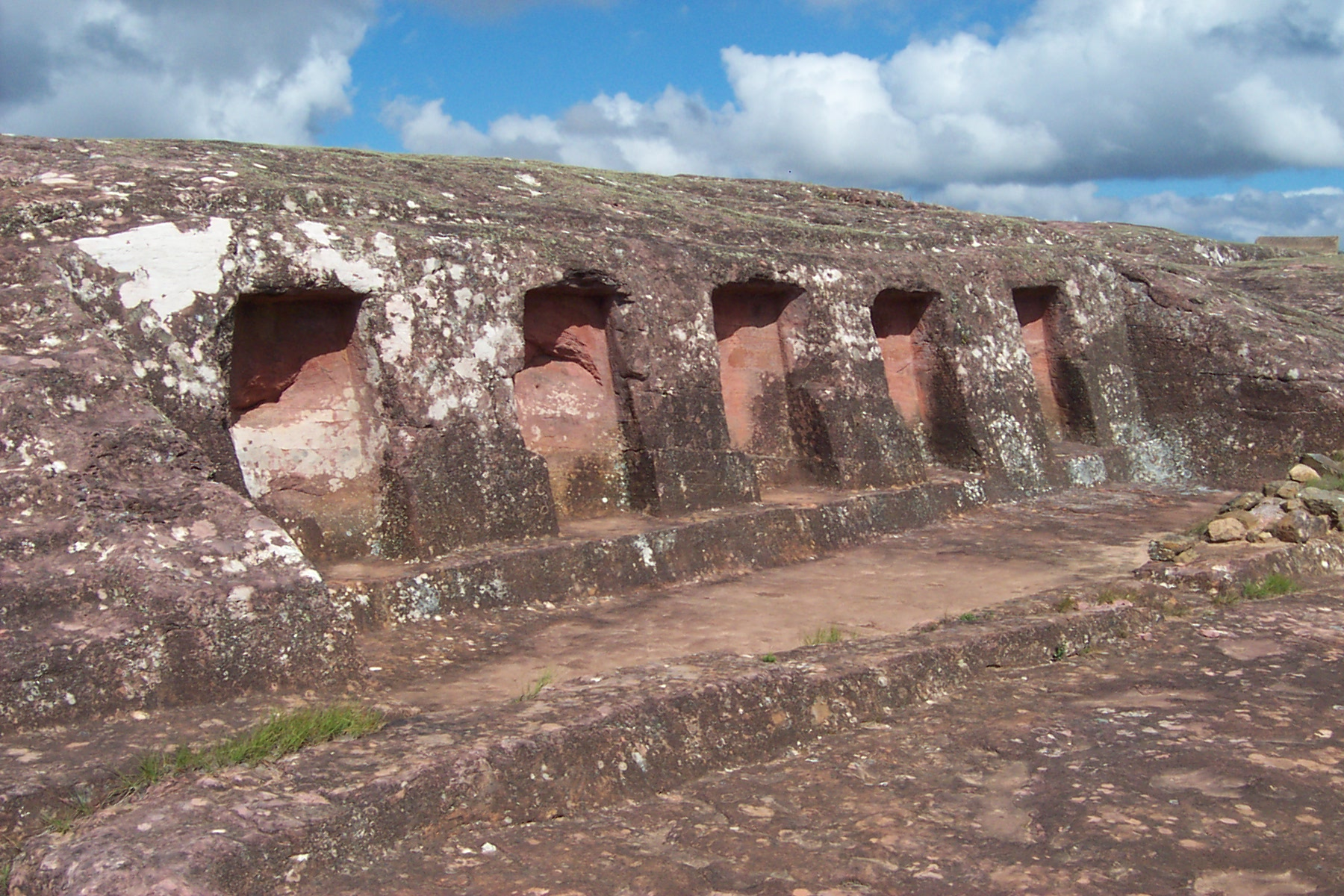
The five seats at the carved stone of Fuerte de Samaipata, Bolivia considered to be a giant ushnu

Located in the lowland of current Bolivia some 125 kilometres (78 mi) from Santa Cruz de la Sierra and known as el Fuerte de Samaipata or simply El Fuerte (the fort), a big rock outcrop is found. It measures approximately 250 by 60 metres (820 by 200 ft) and emerges from the surrounding hills. It was finely carved to produce seats, niches, drainage channels, basins, and animal shapes. It is regarded as, possibly, the largest existing ushnu.

The area was conquered by the Incas to gain access to the forested lowlands and the coca plantations, when they expanded their empire towards the east in the current Santa Cruz Department (Bolivia). It has not yet been ascertained whether the Samaipata settlement was constructed during the rule of Pachacuti, Topa Inca Yupanqui, or Huayna Capac.

It has a large plaza without any built ushnu, but the plaza is overlooked by the huge carved rock outcrop. The animal carvings may have been produced by the pre-Inca Chané culture (c. 800 CE) while the niches are typically Inca. In fact the south side of the outcrop shows five sculpted seats from which persons may have observed the events taking place in the plaza. This could have served as an ushnu for some high ranking individuals. Meyers has called the rock a giant ushnu. This assumption is quite complex because the rock has seats and niches facing different cardinal points and only a few of them could have been used as ushnu for rituals to be kept in the plaza which remains quite far away.

=== Shincal de Quimivil ===
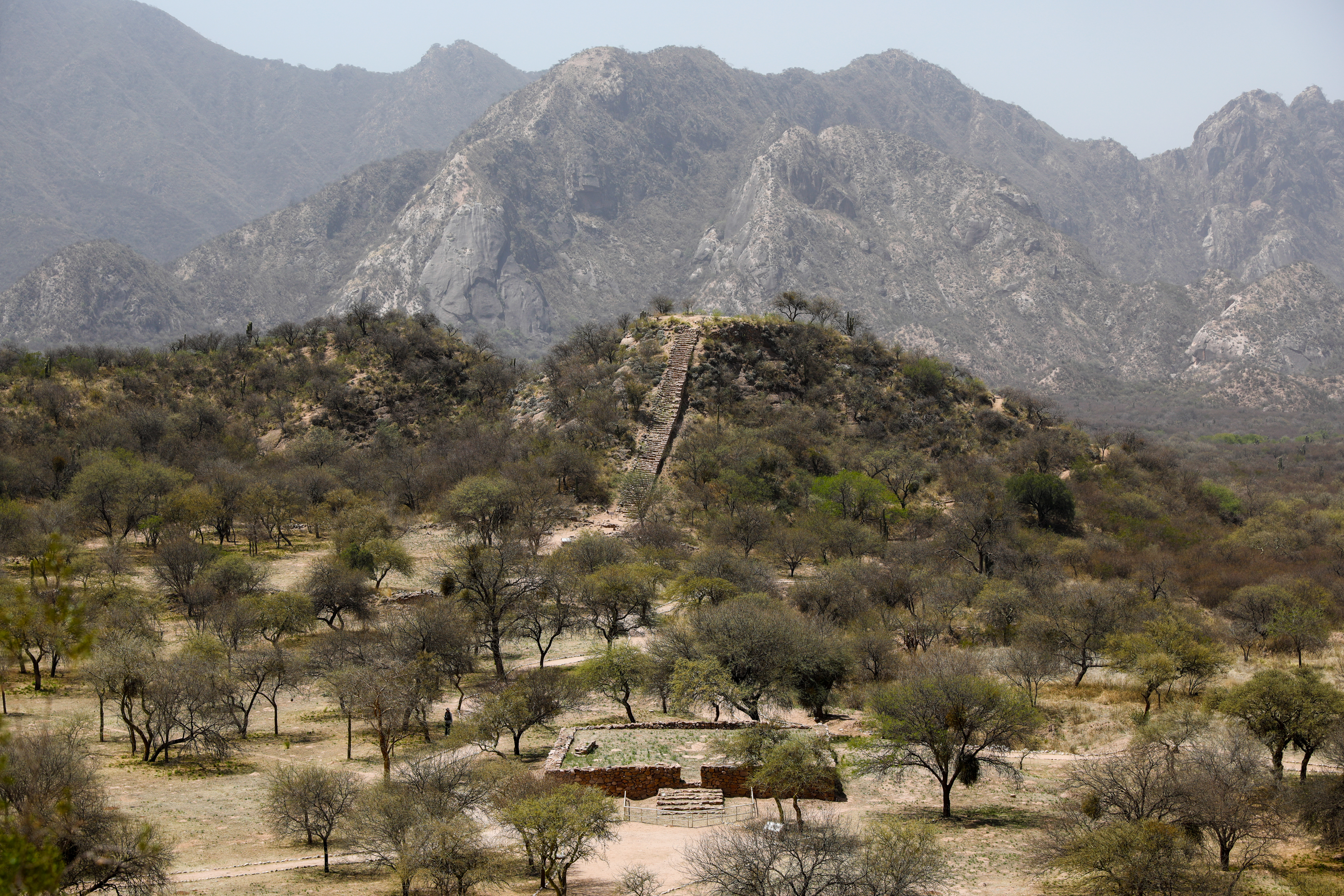
The ushnu at Shincal de Quimivil stands in the lower central part of the picture showing the 9-step stairway (not to be confused with the stairway to the top of the hill in the background)

El Shincal de Quimivil was most probably the capital of one of the districts of the Collasuyu province of the Inca empire. The archaeological investigations, started in 1901, revealed ancient buildings, out of which about one hundred can be found today, that were part of the Inca settlement.

The settlement had a haukaypata (main square), five kallankas (halls) a 3 kilometres (1.9 mi) long aqueduct to provide fresh water, and about twenty collcas (warehouses). The Qhapaq ñan, in its main mountain trunk, crosses the settlement North to South, on the side of the plaza. The urban layout of the road inside El Shincal is completed with a scenic architectural component: two twin hills about 25 metres (82 ft) high are located on both sides of the plaza, their tops were artificially flattened and walled with stones to a height of about 2 metres (6.6 ft). Both hills can be accessed through stone steps.

In the south central part of the plaza stands the ushnu. Its shape is that of a single body slightly pyramidal truncated platform with a square plan 16 by 16 metres (52 by 52 ft) and a height of 2 metres (6.6 ft). It has an access through the west side front, formed by a stone stairway with 9 steps, which leads to a trapezoidal opening placed in the center of the façade. A bench with stone walls filled with mortar and a seat made of flat slates can be observed on the northern sector of the platform. The construction process of the ushnu is part of an accurate planning of the plaza.

Its walls are double with mud filling inside and their blocks were extracted and transported alternately from the nearby hill and river. Before their placement, the stones underwent rudimentary percussion work in order to adapt them to imitate the typical Cusco stonework. This ushnu appears to be the largest built to the South of Cusco. Its measures are a visible sign of the importance of this settlement.

According to the Inka ideology, the ushnu was the conceptual scenario where power and alliances between leaders were assumed and consummated. According to Raffino and colleagues it is more than likely that about one hundred years after the end of the Inca empire, the members of the indigenous rebellion of 1630-1636 used El Shincal and specifically its ushnu to consolidate their power in search of a rehabilitation of indigenous rights. This tends to confirm that during the uprising, the symbolism of the Inca ushnu in the local ideology had not yet ended.
