= Adán Quiroga =

- Born: José Joaquín Adán Quiroga; March 6, 1863; San Juan, Argentina
- Died: November 10, 1904 (aged 41); Buenos Aires, Argentina
- Occupations: Politician, jurist, poet, archeologist, [[historian], journalist and folklorist.
- Spouse: Delia Gómez Acuña (Note: Delia Gómez the daughter of Bernabé Gómez and de Mónica Acuña, who was in turn the daughter of Pío Isaac Acuña, a distinguished director of Partido Federal (Argentina).)
- Parent(s): Joaquín Quiroga; Josefa Ovejero

Adán Quiroga (born March 6 1863 in San Juan, Argentina — died November 10, 1904 in Buenos Aires) was a Chilean politician, jurist, poet, archaeologist, historian, journalist, and folklorist.

== Early life ==
Adán Quiroga was born to of Joaquín Quiroga and Josefa Ovejero in San Juan. In 1866 his family moved to San Fernando del Valle de Catamarca, due to political problems in San Juan. His father had also been named a judge in Catamarca by president Bartolomé Mitre.

He attended primary and secondary school in Catamarca. Upon completing his studies, he moved to Córdoba, where he studied law at the National University of Córdoba, from which he graduated in 1884; one year later, he graduated in canon law. There he became friends with Joaquín V. González, with whom he became involved in journalism, writing for La Propaganda and El Interior.

== Works ==
- Flores del aire (Poesías, 1893, )
- Proyecto de código de Policía y procedimientos judiciales (1895)
- Antigüedades calchaquies (1896)
- Ley orgánica de los tribunales (1897)
- Folklore Calchaqui (1897)
- Procedimientos de la justicia de paz (1897)
