= Belén Department =

Belén Departamento Belén
- Department
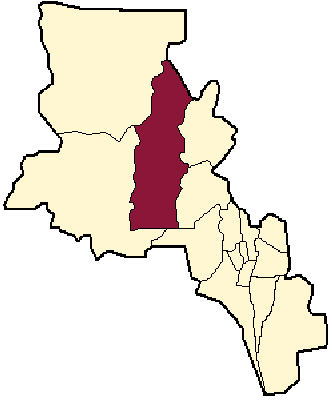
- location of Belén Department in Catamarca Province
- Coordinates: 27°39′S 67°02′W
- Country: Argentina
- Established: July 12, 1658 (city)
- Founder: ?
- Seat: Belén

Government
  - Mayor: Daniel Eduardo Ríos, FCS

Area
  - Total: 12,945 km^{2} (4,998 sq mi)

Population (2001 census [INDEC])
  - Total: 12,252
  - Density: 0.94647/km^{2} (2.4513/sq mi)
- Demonym: beleña/o
- Postal Code: K4750
- IFAM: CAT005
- Area Code: 03835
- Patron saint: ?
- Website: web.archive.org/web/20060515160547/http://www.camsencat.gov.ar/belen.html

Belén is a department of Catamarca Province in Argentina.

The provincial subdivision has a population of about 12,000 inhabitants in an area of 12,945 km^{2} (4,998 sq mi), and its capital city is Belén, which is located around 1,465 kilometres from Buenos Aires City.

== Economy ==
The mainstay of the economy is farming, but there are also a number of mines in the department, with the extraction of gold, silver and various minerals.
