= Hatun Rumiyoc =

Hatun Rumiyoq Street
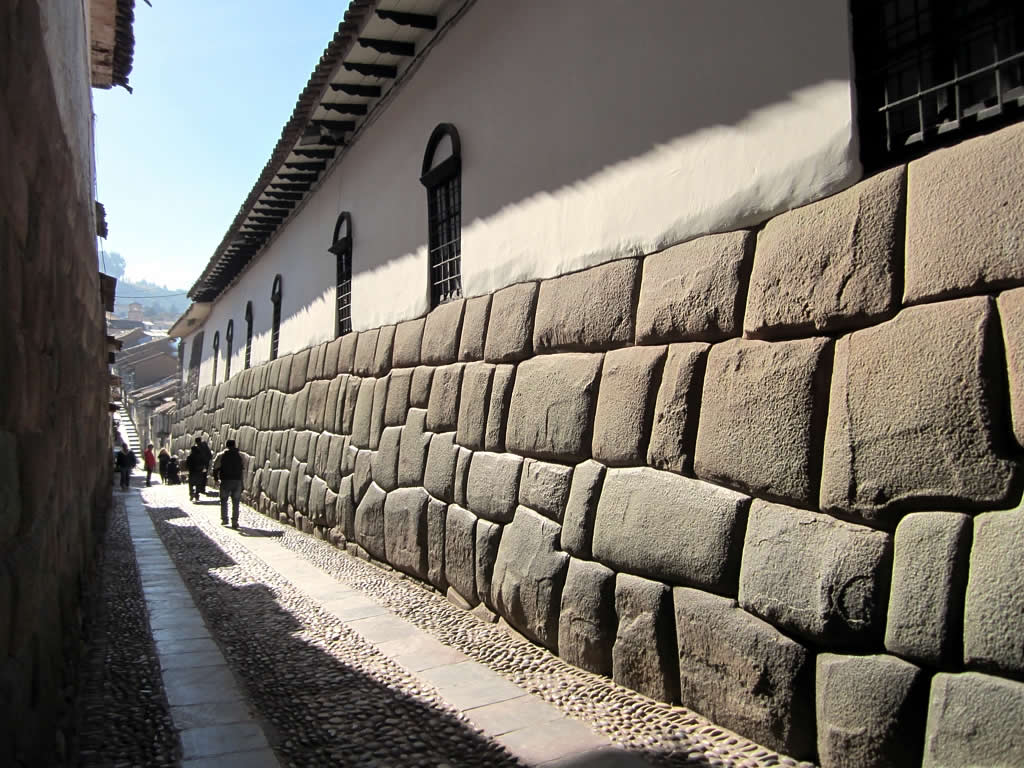
- Hatun Rumiyoq
- Interactive map of Hatun Rumiyoq Street
- Type: Pedestrian
- Maintained by: Municipality of Cusco
- Length: 141 m (463 ft)
- Width: 3 m (9.8 ft)
- Location: Cusco, Peru
- Coordinates: 13°30′57.54″S 71°58′34.59″W
- Northeast end: Choquechaka Street / Cuesta de San Blas
- Southwest end: Herrajes Street / Palacio Street, Triunfo Street

Construction
- Inauguration: Incan period

Other
- Known for: Twelve-angled stone, Archbishop's Palace of Cusco

UNESCO World Heritage Site
- Part of: City of Cuzco
- Criteria: Cultural: iii, iv
- Reference: 273
- Inscription: 1983 (7th Session)
- Area: Latin America and the Caribbean

Hatun Rumiyoq Street (from Southern Quechua: *Hatun Rumiyuq*, meaning "street with the great stone") is a historic pedestrian street located in the monumental zone of Cusco, Peru. It is part of the processional axis of Cusco, a historical route connecting the Plazoleta de San Blas with the Plazoleta de la Almudena. This axis corresponds to ancient Inca roads (Qhapaq Ñan) linking the Antisuyu to the northeast and the Contisuyu to the southwest from the Huacaypata.

On the southeastern edge of the street stands the well-preserved Inca wall of what was once the palace of the emperor Inca Roca.

The street is best known for the Twelve-angled stone, a finely cut diorite block that forms part of the wall of the Archbishop's Palace of Cusco. The palace is believed to have been constructed on the site of Inca Roca’s residence. After the Spanish conquest, it became the residence of the first bishop of Cusco, Vicente de Valverde, and his sister María Valverde, who was married to conquistador Rodrigo de Orgóñez.

In 1972, the street was declared a National Historic Monument of Peru. In 1983, it became part of the UNESCO World Heritage Site listing for the Historic Centre of Cusco, and in 2014, it was also inscribed under the Qhapaq Ñan – Andean Road System.

== See also ==
- Twelve-angled stone
- Qhapaq Ñan
- Inca architecture
