= Polygonal masonry =

Masonry comprising stones with over 4 face angles

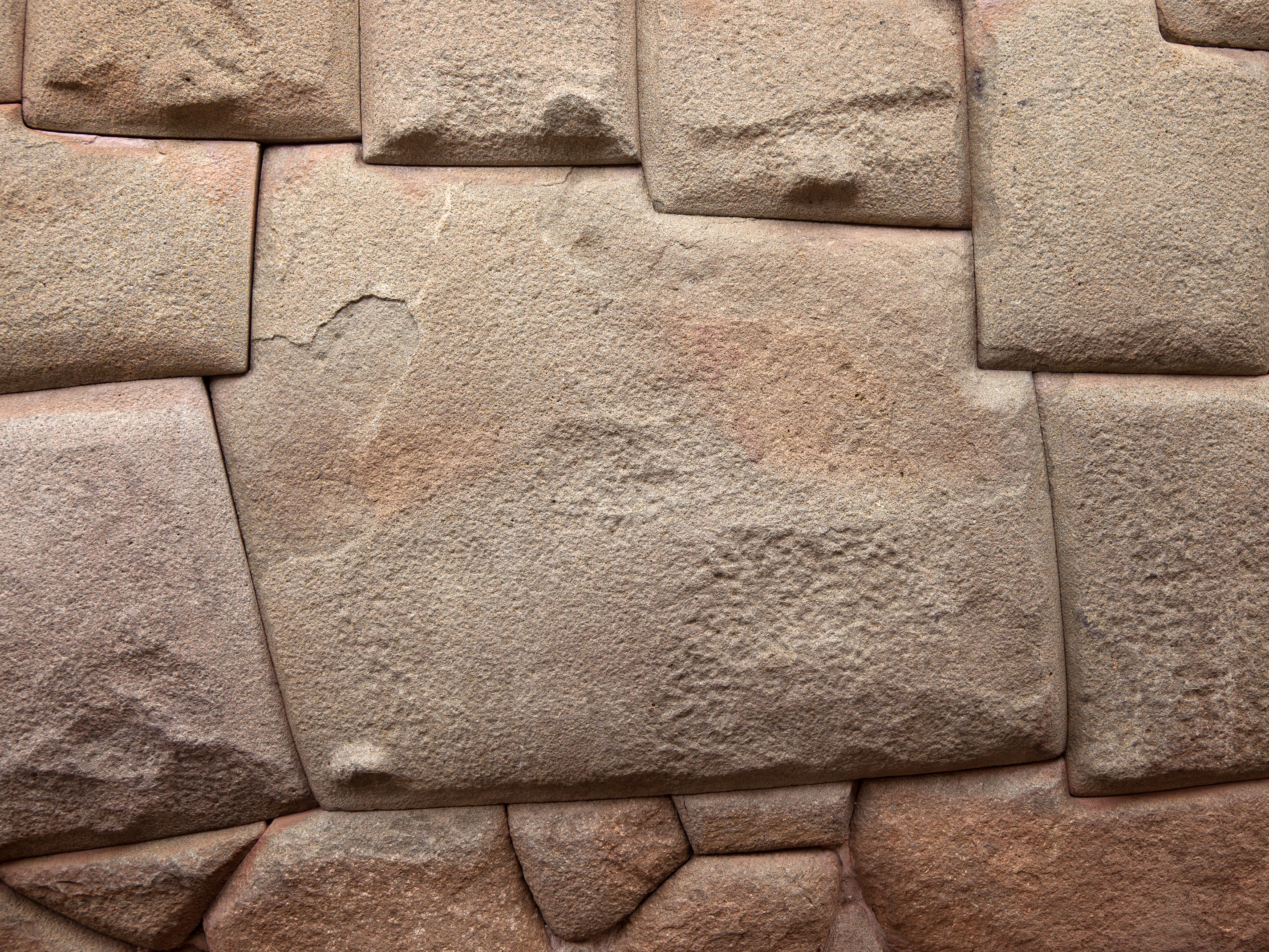
The twelve-angled stone, Hatunrumiyoc street, Cusco, Peru

Polygonal masonry consists of stones that have five or more face angles, in contrast to ashlar blocks which have four rectangular ones.

In Greece, Cyclopean masonry was the first type of polygonal masonry. To fit the stones properly to each other, masons would utilize strips of lead to form templates of the already laid blocks, which were then used to shape the to-be-adjoined ones.

== Sites ==
=== Easter Island ===
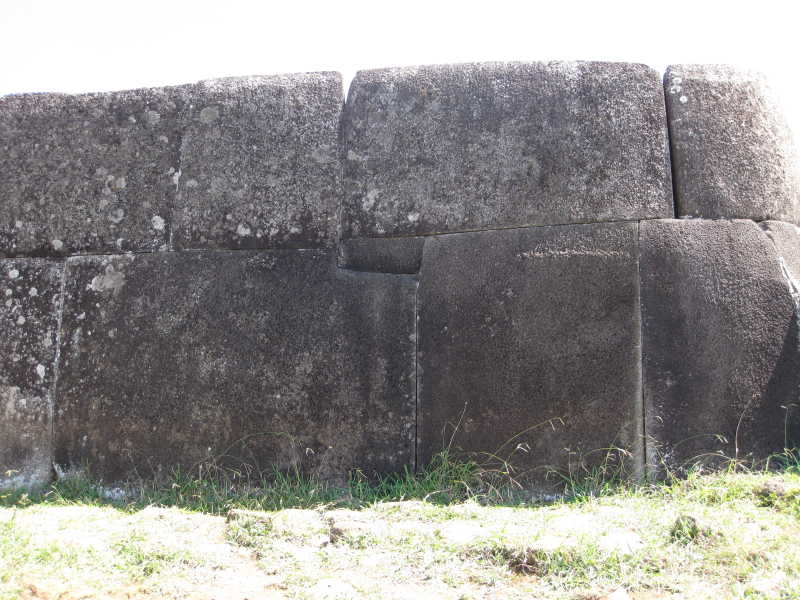
Ahu Vinapu, on Easter Island

- Ahu Vinapu

=== Finland ===
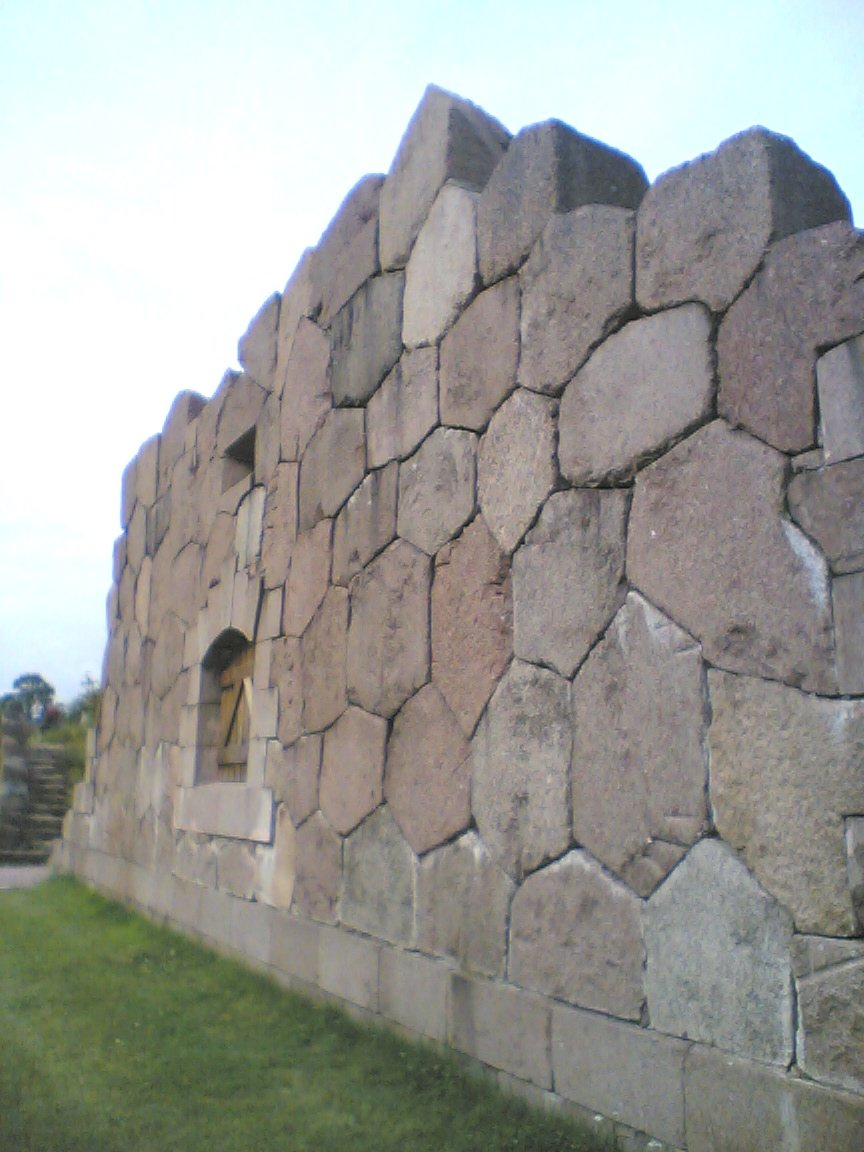
A part of the wall of the Bomarsund Fortress, Finland

- Bomarsund Fortress

=== Greece ===
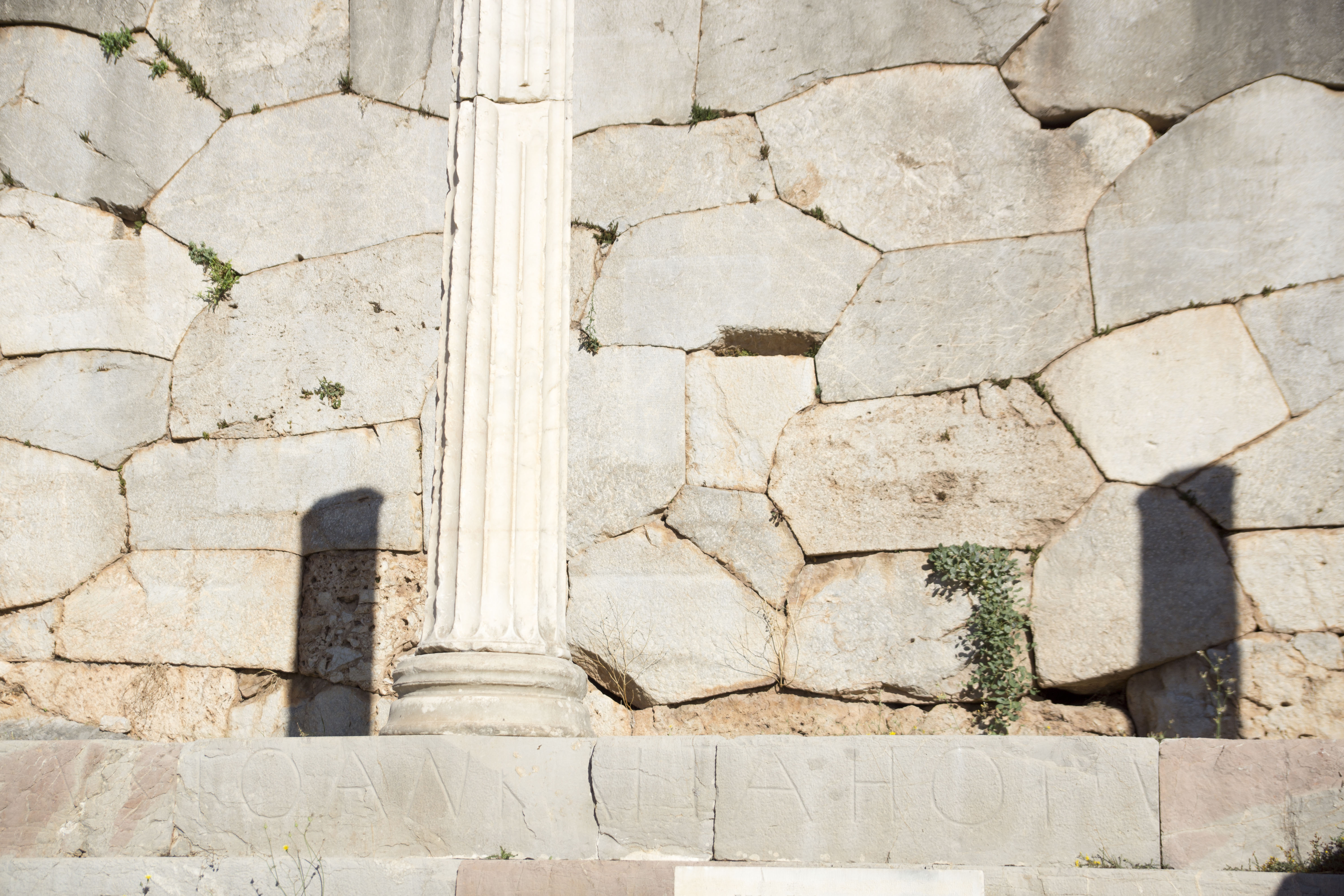
Section of polygonal wall at Delphi, Greece

- Delphi
- Keramikos
- Nekromanteion

=== Italy ===
In Italy, polygonal masonry is particularly indicative of the region of Latium, but it occurs also in Etruria, Lucania, Samnium, and Umbria; scholars including Giuseppe Lugli have carried out studies of the technique. Some notable sites that have fortification walls built in this technique include Norba, Signia, Alatri, Boiano, Circeo, Cosa, Alba Fucens, Palestrina, and Terracina. The Porta Rosa of the ancient city of Velia employs a variant of the technique known as Lesbian masonry.

=== Japan ===
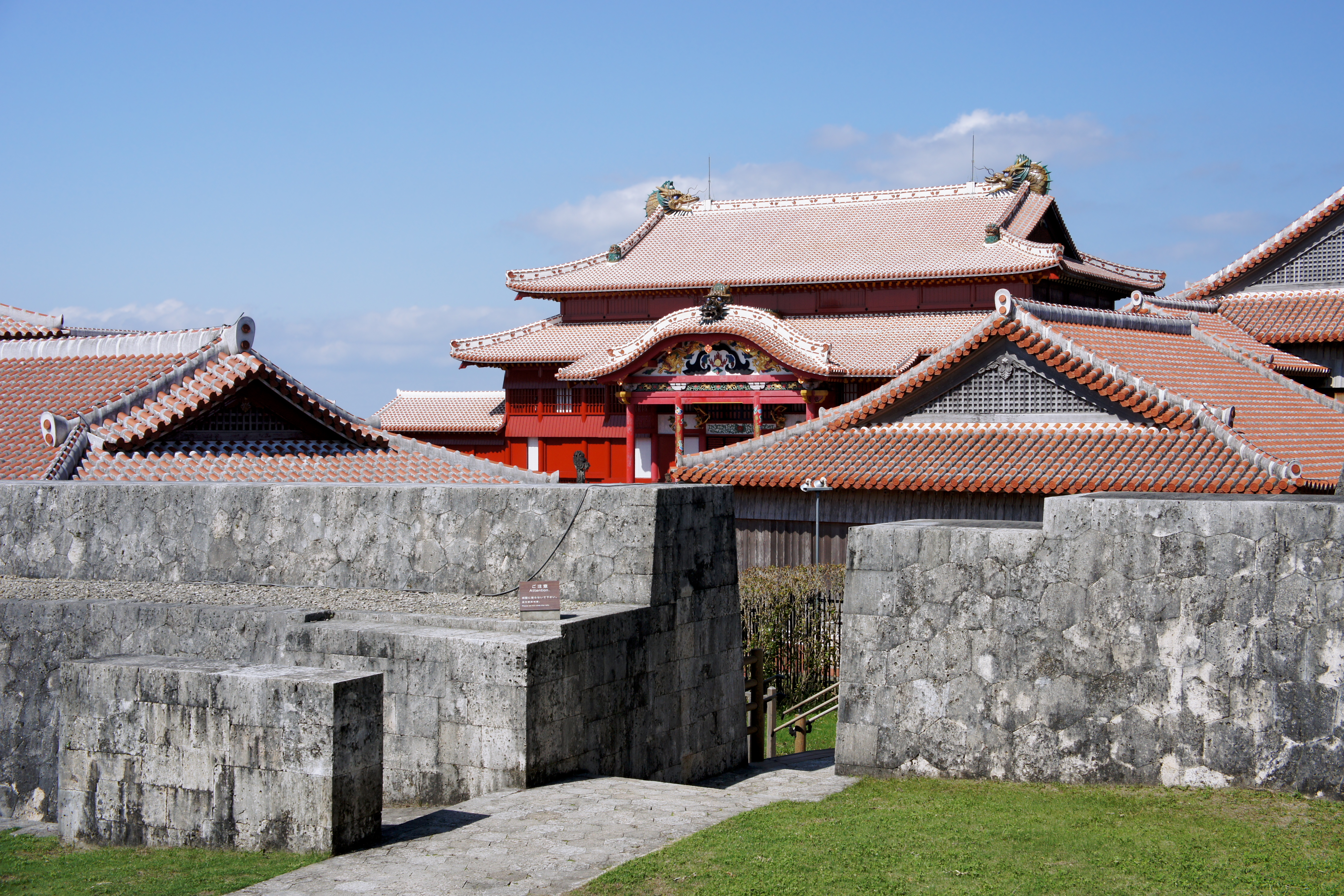
Shuri Castle, Naha, Japan

- Akō Castle
- Fushimi Castle
- Nakagusuku Castle
- Nijō Castle
- Odawara Castle
- Oka Castle
- Osaka Castle
- Shibata Castle
- Shuri Castle
- Uwajima Castle

=== Latvia ===
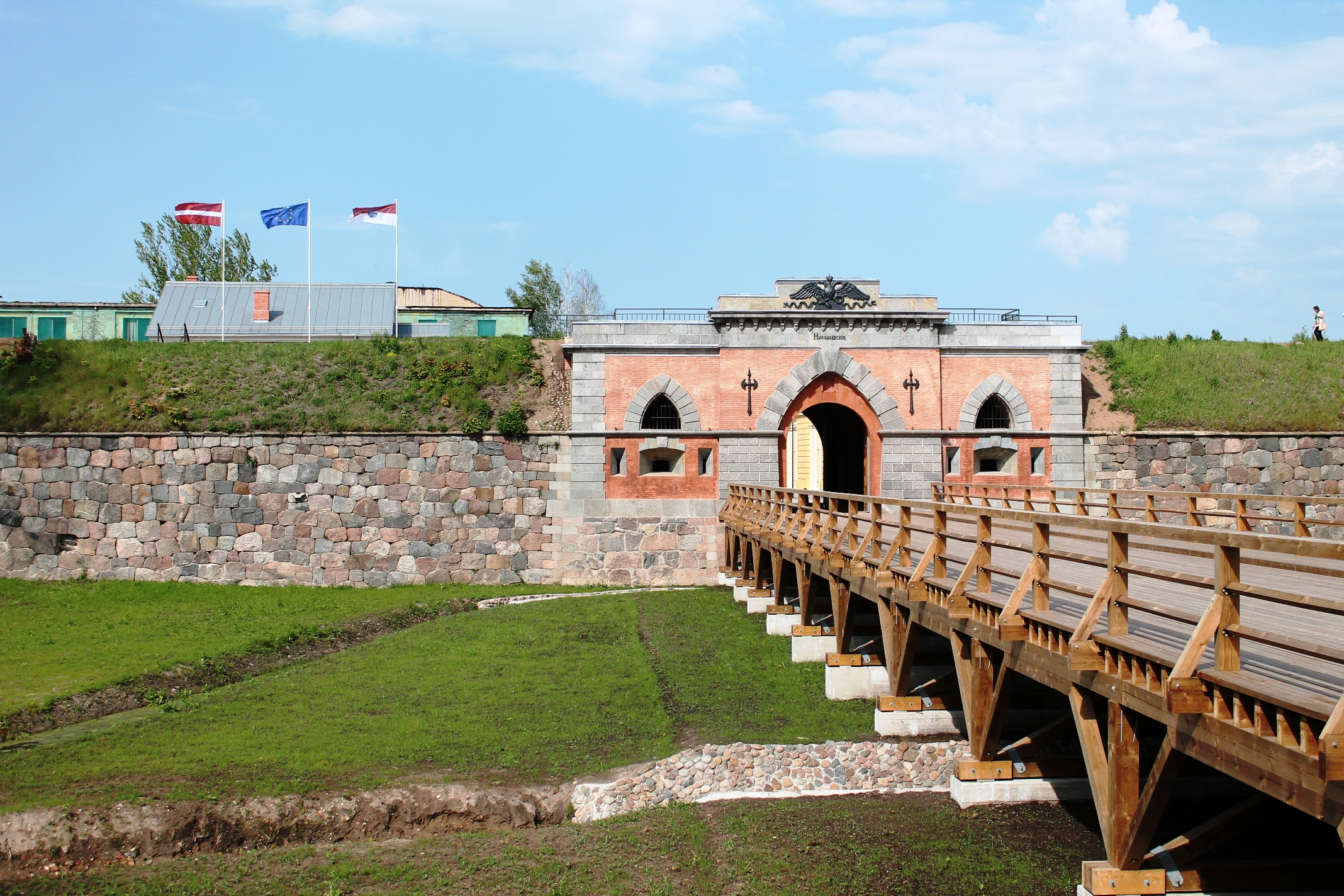
Daugavpils Fortress, Latvia

- Daugavpils

=== Malta ===
- Ħaġar Qim
- Megalithic Temples of Malta

=== Peru ===
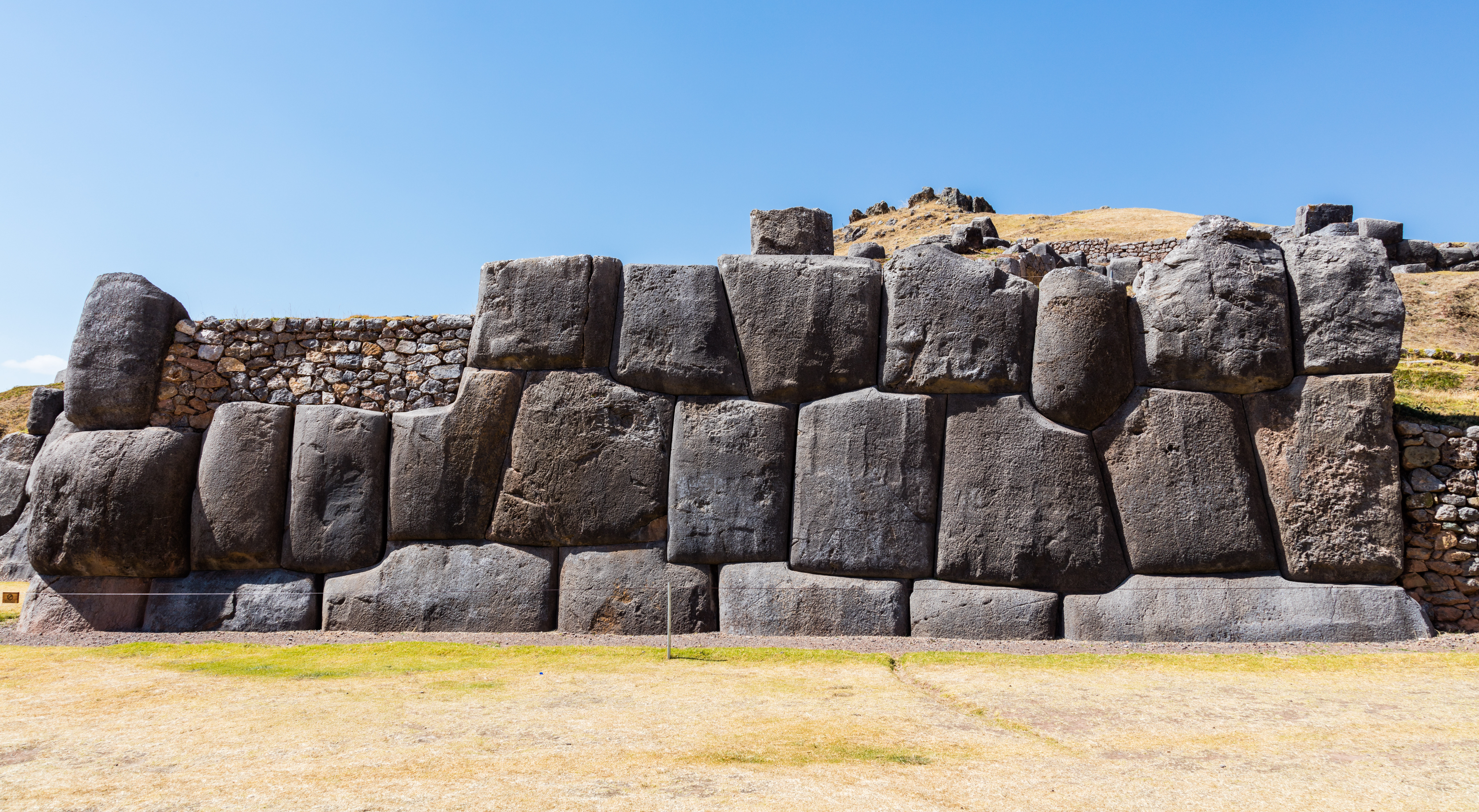
Sacsayhuamán, Cusco

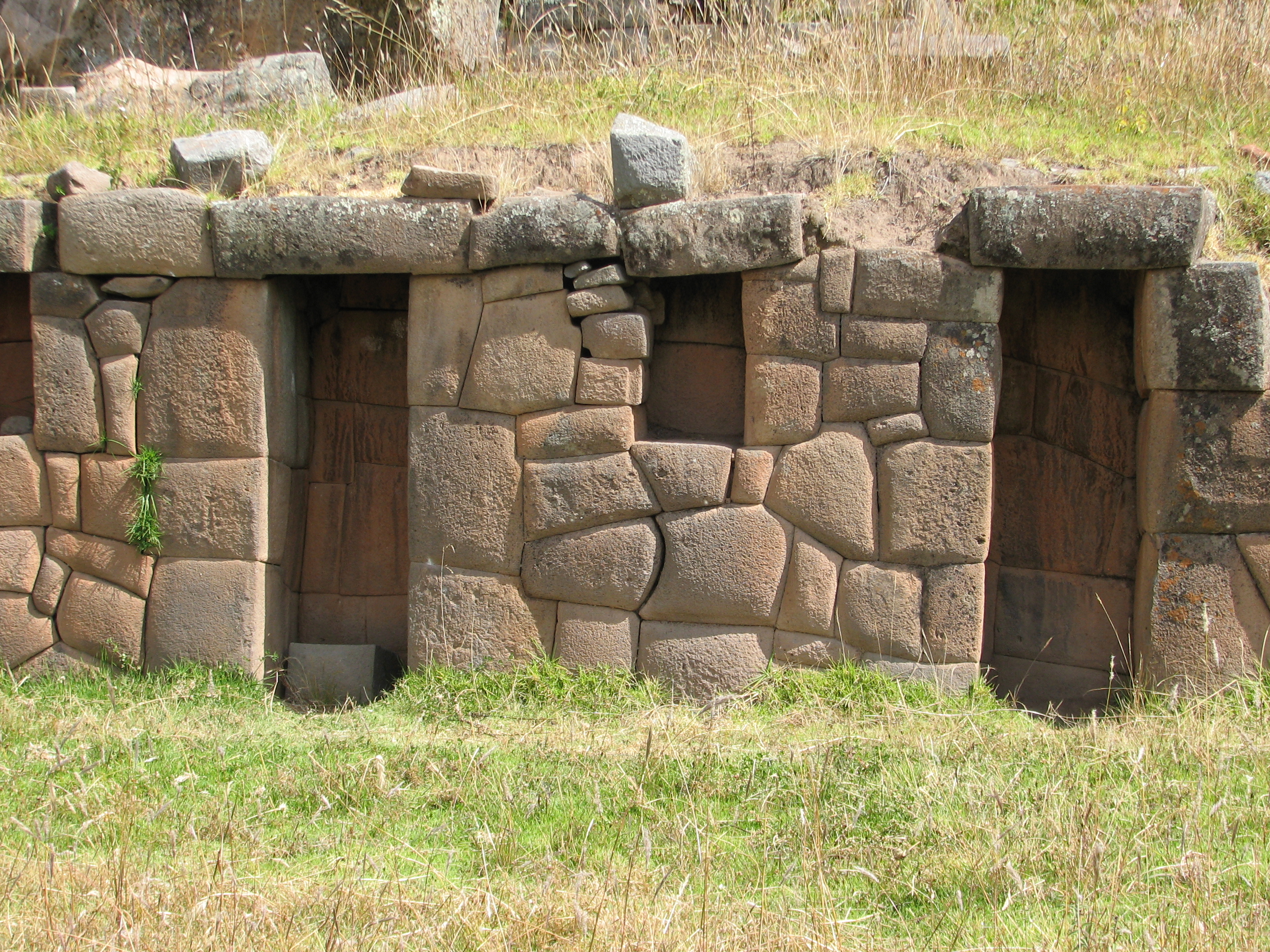
Inti Watana archaeological site

- Chinchero
- Chullpa Towers
- Coricancha
- Inti Watana, Ayacucho
- Ollantaytambo
- Raqch'i
- Saksaywaman
- Tambomachay
- Tarawasi
- Usnu
- Vilcabamba
- Vilcashuamán
- Wanuku Pampa
- Twelve-angled_stone

=== Portugal ===
- Quinta da Regaleira

=== Russia ===
- Königsberg Castle

=== Spain ===
- Castell d'Olèrdola

=== Turkey ===
- Hattusa

=== United Arab Emirates ===
- Hili Archaeological Park
