= Inca architecture =

Pre-Columbian architecture in South America

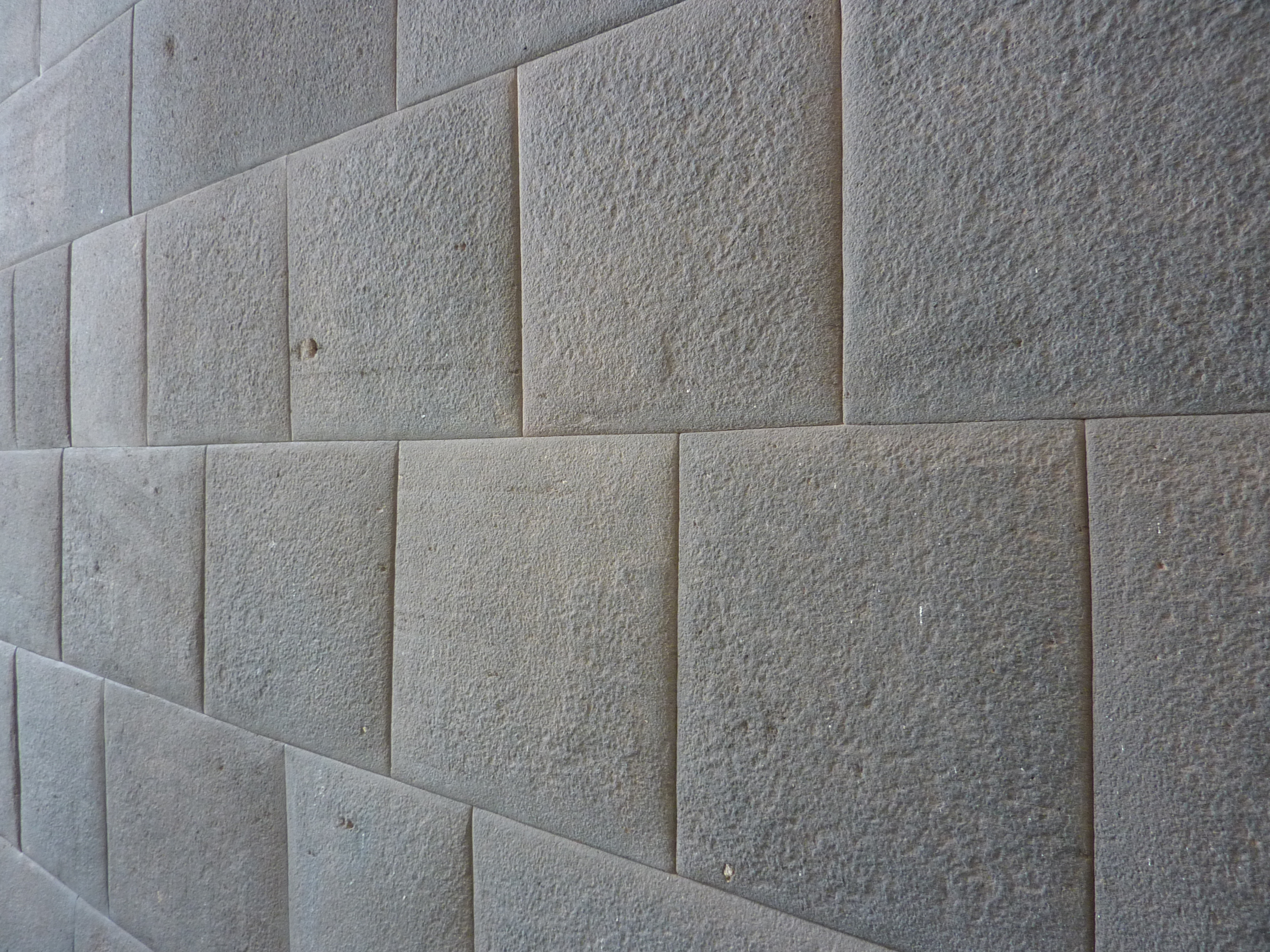
Ashlar masonry wall of the Coricancha temple, at Cuzco, the capital city of the Inca Empire.

Inca architecture is the most significant pre-Columbian architecture in South America. The Incas inherited an architectural legacy from Tiwanaku, founded in the 2nd century B.C.E. in present-day Bolivia. A core characteristic of the architectural style was to use the topography and existing materials of the land as part of the design. The capital of the Inca empire, Cuzco, still contains many fine examples of Inca architecture, although many walls of Inca masonry have been incorporated into Spanish Colonial structures. The famous royal estate of Machu Picchu is a surviving example of Inca architecture. Other significant sites include Sacsayhuamán and Ollantaytambo. The Incas also developed an extensive road system spanning most of the western length of the continent and placed their distinctive architecture along the way, thereby visually asserting their imperial rule along the frontier.

== Characteristics ==
Inca buildings were often made out of fieldstones or semi-worked stone blocks and dirt set in mortar; adobe walls were also quite common, usually laid over stone foundations. The material used in the Inca buildings depended on the region, for instance, in the coast they typically used rectangular adobe blocks, while in the Andes they more commonly used local stones. The most common shape in Inca architecture was the rectangular building without any internal walls and roofed with wooden beams and thatch, usually made from ichu. There were several variations of this basic design, including gabled roofs, rooms with one or two of the long sides opened and rooms that shared a long wall. Rectangular buildings were used for quite different functions in almost all Inca buildings, from humble houses to palaces and temples. Even so, there are some examples of curved walls on Inca buildings, such as at Coricancha, Ingapirca, and Machu Picchu's Temple of the Sun. Two-storied buildings were infrequent; when they were built the second floor was accessed from the outside via a stairway or high terrain rather than from the first floor. Wall apertures, including doors, niches and windows, usually had a trapezoidal shape; they could be fitted with double or triple jambs as a form of ornamentation. Other kinds of decoration were scarce; some walls were painted or adorned with metal plaques, in rare cases walls were sculpted with small animals or geometric patterns, such as the chakana.

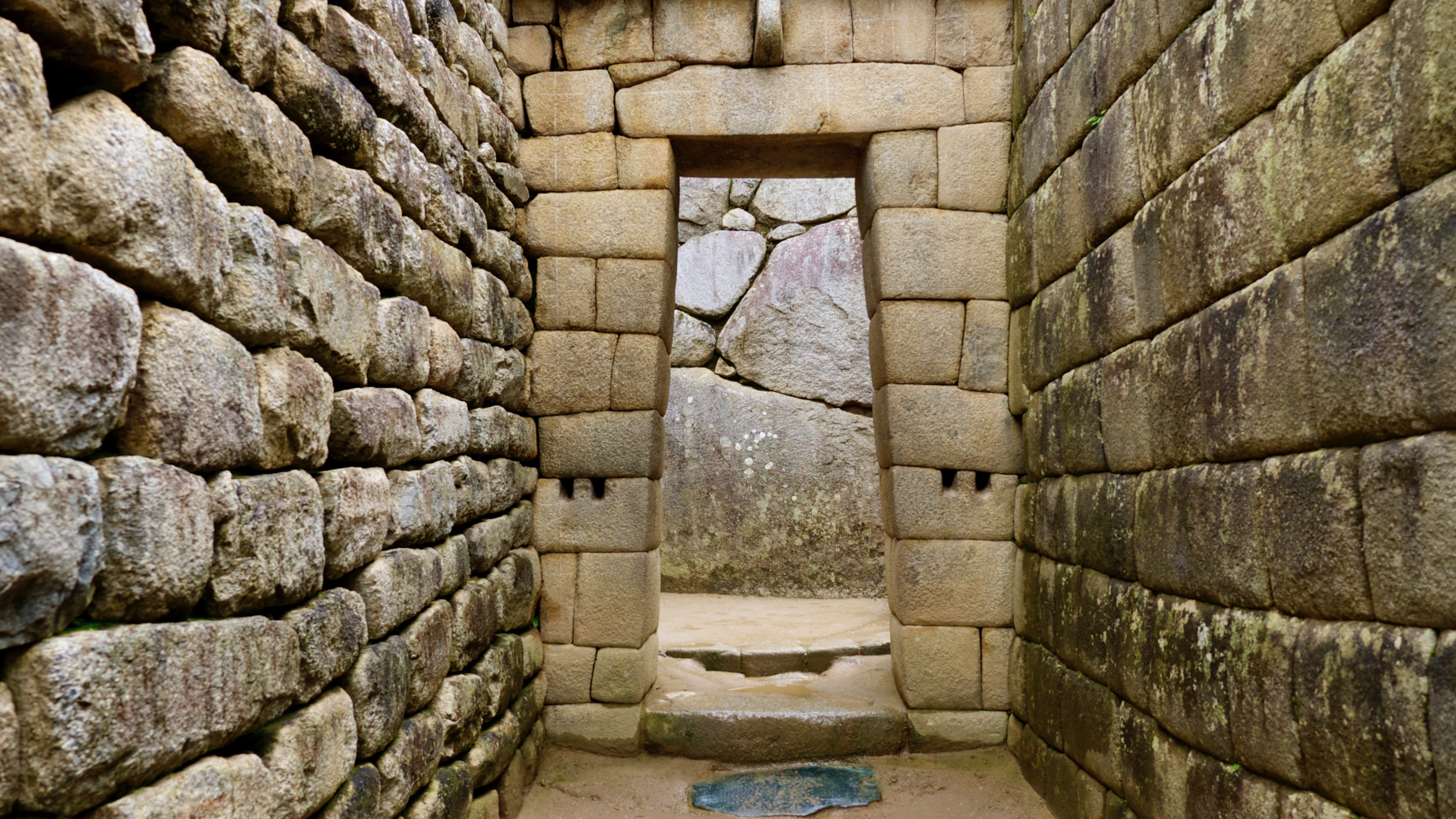
A trapezoidal doorway, a common element in Inca architecture, at Machu Picchu

The most common composite form in Inca architecture was the kancha, a rectangular enclosure housing three or more rectangular buildings placed symmetrically around a central courtyard. Kancha units served widely different purposes as they formed the basis of simple dwellings as well as of temples and palaces; furthermore, several kancha could be grouped together to form blocks in Inca settlements. A testimony of the importance of these compounds in Inca architecture is that the central part of the Inca capital of Cusco consisted of large kancha, including Coricancha and the Inca palaces. The best preserved examples of kancha are found at Ollantaytambo, an Inca settlement located along the Urubamba River.

Another popular feature of Inca architecture is the qullqa, or what was once storehouses for grain and other crops. These were commonly located at higher elevations where the air was cooler to aid in food preservation.

Inca architecture is widely known for its fine masonry, which features precisely cut and shaped stones closely fitted without mortar ("dry"). However, despite this fame, most Inca buildings were actually made out of fieldstone and adobe as described above. More precise fitting masonry was more commonly featured on higher status buildings, such as palaces and temples. In the 1940s, American archaeologist John H. Rowe classified Inca fine masonry in two types: coursed, which features rectangular shaped stones, and polygonal, which features blocks of irregular shape. Forty years later, Peruvian architect Santiago Agurto established four subtypes by dividing the categories identified by Rowe:

- Cellular polygonal masonry: with small blocks
- Ashlar polygonal masonry: with very large stones
- Encased coursed masonry: in which stone blocks are not aligned
- Sedimentary coursed masonry: in which stones are laid out in horizontal rows (i.e., ashlars)

The first two types were used on important buildings or perimeter walls while the last two were employed mostly on terrace walls and river canalization.

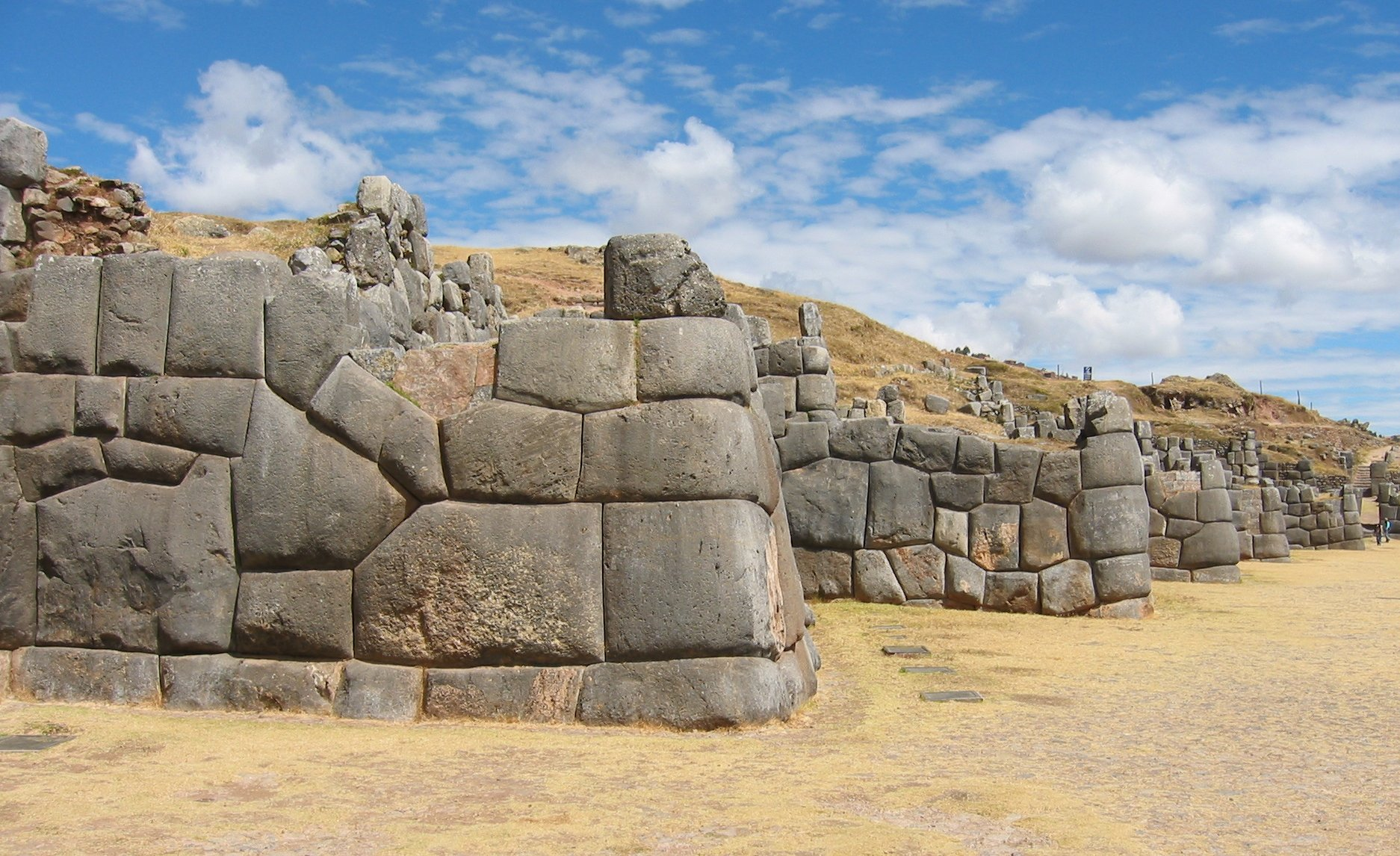
Polygonal masonry at Sacsayhuamán

According to Graziano Gasparini and Luise Margolies, Inca stonemasonry was inspired by the architecture of Tiwanaku, an archaeological site in modern Bolivia built several centuries before the Inca Empire. They argue that according to ethnohistorical accounts the Incas were impressed by these monuments and employed large numbers of stoneworkers from nearby regions in the construction of their own buildings. In addition to these references, they also identified some formal similarities between Tiwanaku and Inca architecture including the use of cut and polished stone blocks, as well as of double jambs. A problem with this hypothesis is the question of how expertise was preserved in the three hundred years between the collapse of Tiwanaku and the appearance of the Inca Empire and its architecture. As a solution, John Hyslop has argued that the Tiahuanaco stonemasonry tradition was preserved in the Lake Titicaca region in sites such as Tanqa Tanqa, which features walls resembling Inca polygonal masonry.

A second major influence on Inca architecture came from the Wari culture, a civilization contemporary to Tiwanaku. According to Ann Kendall, the Huari introduced their tradition of building rectangular enclosures in the Cusco region, which formed a model for the development of the Inca kancha. There is evidence that such traditions were preserved in the Cusco region after the decline of the Wari as is attested by the enclosures found at sites such as Choquequirao (Chuqi K'iraw), 28 kilometers southeast of the Inca capital.

== Masonry and construction methods ==
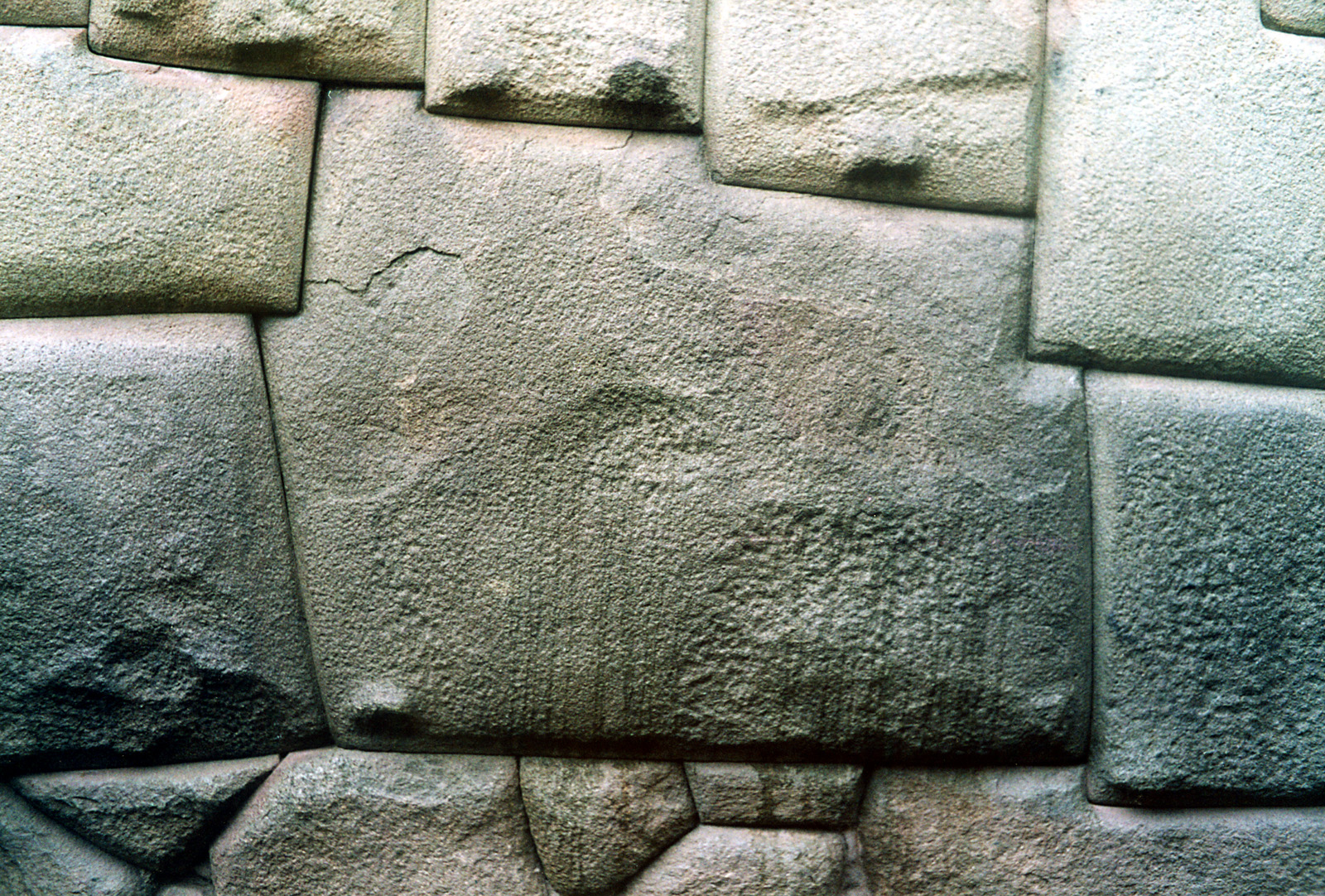
Twelve-angled stone in the Hatun Rumiyoc street of Cusco, is an example of Inca masonry

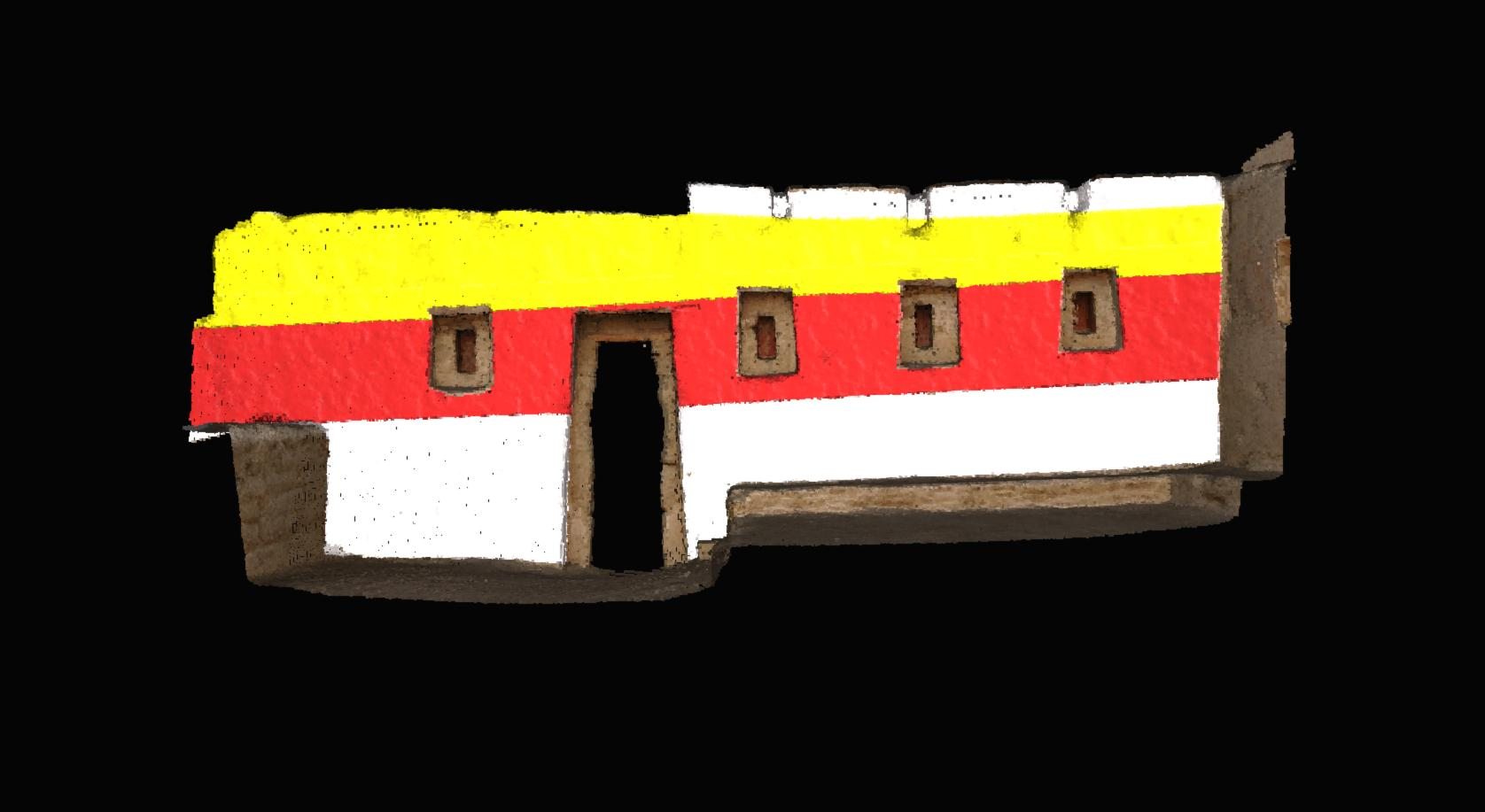
Digital reconstruction of original Inca painting on Room 42 wall, Tambo Colorado; this late Inca period fortress/palace is still largely intact despite being constructed of adobe and located in an earthquake-prone area of Peru. Remaining traces of the original paint guided this 2005 reconstruction. Laser scan data taken from a CyArk/University of California research partnership

Extraordinary manpower would have been necessary for large construction projects. The Inca Empire employed a system of tribute to the Inca government in the form of labor, called Mit'a that required all males between 15-50 to work on large public construction projects. Hyslop comments that the 'secret' to the production of fine Inca masonry “…was the social organization necessary to maintain the great numbers of people creating such energy-consuming monuments.” Spanish Chronicler Pedro Cieza De Leon wrote that Pachacuti "ordered 20,000 men sent in from the provinces" for the construction of Sacsayhuamán, while Juan de Betanzos recorded that 50,000 were employed in Pachacuti's re-construction of Cusco.

Water engineer Ken Wright estimates that 60 percent of the Inca construction effort was underground. The Inca built their cities with locally available materials, usually including limestone or granite. To cut these hard rocks the Inca used stone, bronze or copper tools, usually splitting the stones along natural fracture lines, or by chiseling out a row of holes and splitting the stones with wedges.

The stones were moved by teams of men pulling with ropes, as shown in the drawings of chronicler Felipe Guaman Poma de Ayala. Cieza De Leon also writes "4000 of them quarried and cut the stones; 6000 hauled them with great cables of leather and hemp." Similar ropes used on Incan suspension bridges were made with ichu grass. Small ropes of these materials have been shown to support a load of 4000lbs, and larger ropes may have been able to hold up to 50,000lbs. The stones were rolled to their positions using wooden beams on earth ramps. Unfinished chullpa at Cutimbo and Sillustani still have stone ramps in place, and a large earthen ramp can be seen leading from the quarry up to Ollantaytambo's Wall of the Six Monoliths. Father Cobo saw Incan builders using a similar ramp during the construction of the Cusco Cathedral.

It is speculated that stones were initially fit using hammerstones. Hammerstone impact marks can be seen on the faces of many stones, and small stone chips have been found in excavations below walls. The stones would then be lifted into place with a rope sling tied to lifting bosses near the stone's base, many of which can still be seen on Incan walls. Adjustments could have been performed by eye alone or aided by the use of a compressible dust, such as the dried sap of the llawlli plant (Barnadesia horrida). Abrasive finishers, such as sand or pumice, may also have been used.

Additional surface smoothing near the edges of blocks has been attributed by some researchers to a chemical etching "mortar" composed of pyrite mining slurry and plants containing calcium oxalate. Some species of bacteria from the genus Thiobacillus are able to process sulfidic minerals and produce sulfuric acid as a byproduct; complexation with oxalate increases the etching potential of the mixture. This would correspond with both contemporary descriptions of the Incan masonry process and regional folklore suggesting that Incan masons and a local bird species, the pito, were capable of softening rocks with a local herb. However, the glossy glaze seen on some stones can also be attributed to deposited calcite from dissolved limestone.

Usually the walls of Incan buildings were slightly inclined inside and the corners were rounded. This, in combination with masonry thoroughness, led Incan buildings to have a peerless seismic resistance thanks to high static and dynamic steadiness, absence of resonant frequencies, and stress concentration points. During a small or moderate earthquake, masonry was stable; during strong earthquakes, stone blocks have been observed "dancing" and settling into their original positions afterwards.

Another building method was called "pillow-faced" architecture. The Incas would sand large, finely-shaped stones which they would fit together in jigsaw-like patterns. Pillow-faced architecture was typically used for temples and royal places like Machu Picchu.

Ashlar masonry was used in the most sacred, elite Incan structures; for example, the Acllawasi ("House of the Chosen Woman"), the Coricancha ("Golden Enclosure") in Cuzco, and the Sun Temple at Machu Picchu. Thus it seems that ashlar may have been more greatly valued by the Inca, perhaps considered more difficult than polygonal ("pillow-faced") masonry. Though polygonal masonry may be aesthetically more impressive, the fracture of ashlar masonry tends to be unforgiving to mistakes; if the corner of a polygonal masonry block is broken, it can be reshaped to fit, but ashlar masonry blocks must remain intact.

== Symbolism and patronage ==
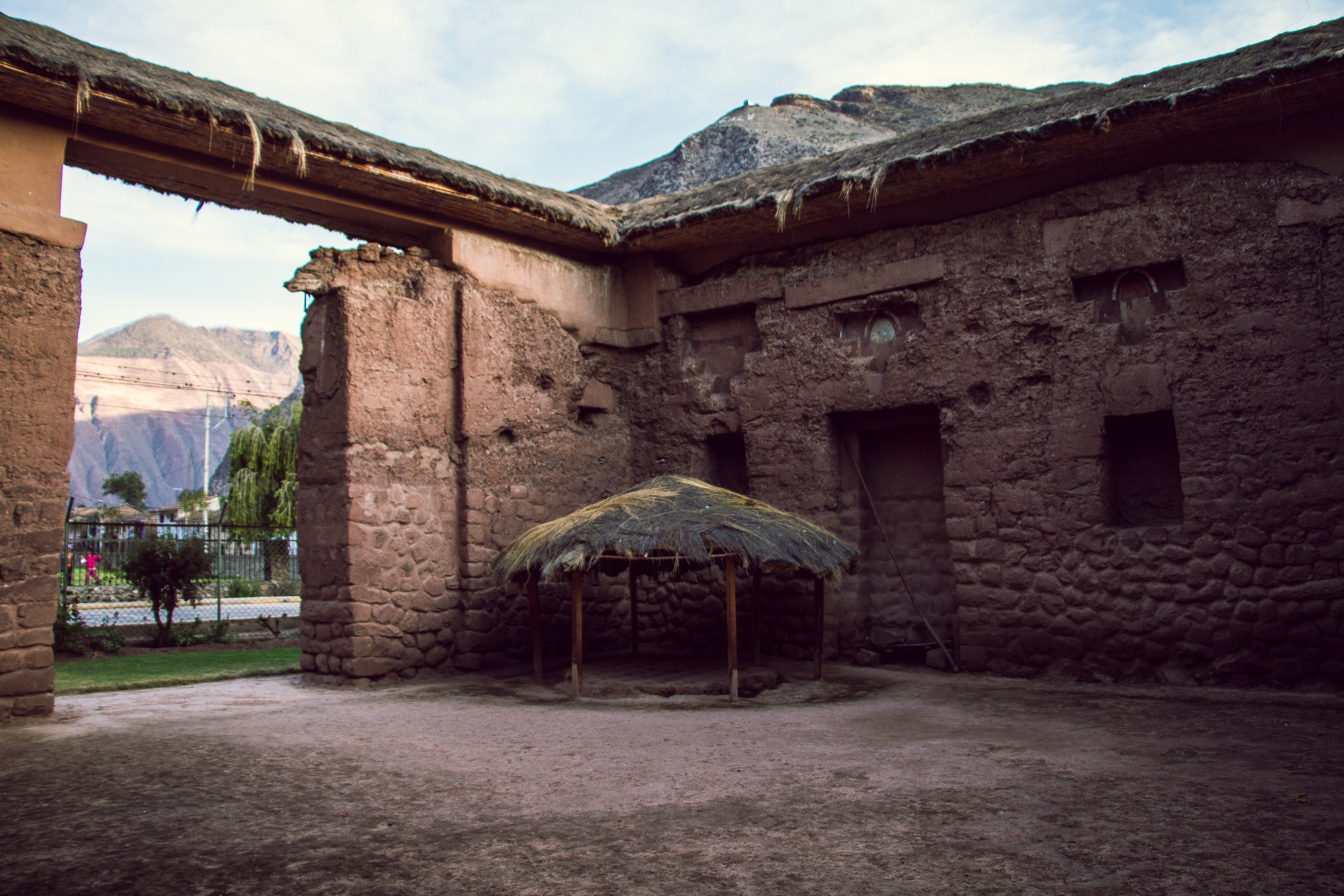
Palace of Diego Sayri Túpac, Yucay

=== Aesthetics ===
Inca architecture is strongly characterized by its use of the natural environment. The Inca managed to seamlessly merge their architecture into the surrounding land and its specificities. At its peak, the Inca Empire spanned from Ecuador to Chile. Yet despite geographic variances, Inca architecture remained consistent in its ability to visually blend the built and natural environment.

In particular, Inca walls practiced mortarless masonry and used partially worked, irregularly shaped rocks to complement the organic qualities and diversity of the natural environment. Through the dry fitted masonry techniques of caninacukpirca, the Incas shaped their stone to conceal natural outcrops, fit tight crevices, and ultimately incorporate the landscape into their infrastructure.

The Inca also used natural bedrock as their structural foundations (to help keep the buildings stable). This was for stabilizing their structures built in the Andes mountain range of South America, while aesthetically disguising the boundaries between mountain and edifice. In combination, the diversity of stone shape, materiality, and facture all furthered the naturalistic illusion of the Inca's built environment.

=== Politics ===
Inca employment and integration of the natural environment into their architecture played an essential role in their program of civilizational expansion and cultural imperialism. Patronage of powerful elites and rulers of the Inca empire was a major impetus behind the construction of Inca structures, and much of the remaining architecture we see today was most likely royal estates or mobile capitals for Sapa Inca to inhabit. The Sapa Inca naturalized and asserted their political rule through their palaces' aesthetic appeal to a reciprocal relationship between their imperialism and the earth itself. The blended, architectural aesthetic colored their political expansion in a sense of inseparable, timeless, and spiritual authority. For example, in the royal estate of Chinchero, the Incas adapted their large-scale earthwork and massive stone construction to the land's dramatically steep valley in order to create intense, visual drama. Similarly to the architecture of other mountainous Inca citadels, such as Machu Picchu, the Chinchero estate's dynamic construction into the severe landscape demonstrated the raw, physical power of the Incas, and projected an authoritative aura for those who approached.

== See also ==
- Suspension bridge
- Inca rope bridge
