= Segni =

- Comune
- Città di Segni
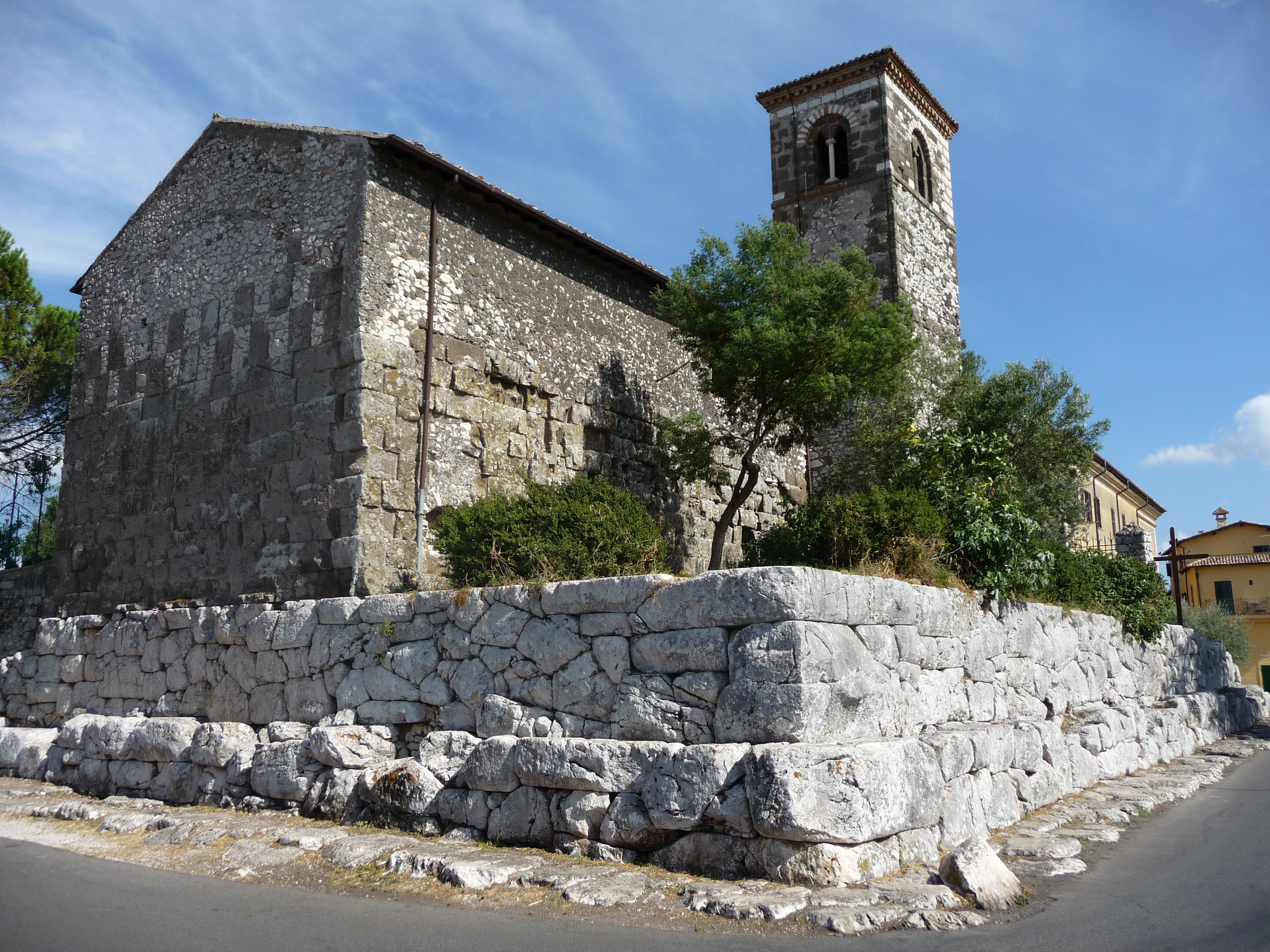
- ancient temple base of Juno Moneta on the acropolis

- Location within Italy Location within Lazio
- Coordinates: 41°41′N 13°01′E
- Country: Italy
- Region: Lazio
- Metropolitan city: Rome (RM)

Area
  - Total: 60.86 km^{2} (23.50 sq mi)
- Elevation: 668 m (2,192 ft)

Population (2018-01-01)
  - Total: 9,192
  - Density: 151.0/km^{2} (391.2/sq mi)
- Time zone: UTC+1 (CET)
  - Summer (DST): UTC+2 (CEST)
- Website: Official website

Segni (Latin: Signia, Ancient Greek: Σιγνία) is an Italian town and comune located in Lazio. The city is situated on a hilltop in the Lepini Mountains and overlooks the valley of the Sacco River.

== History ==
=== Early history ===
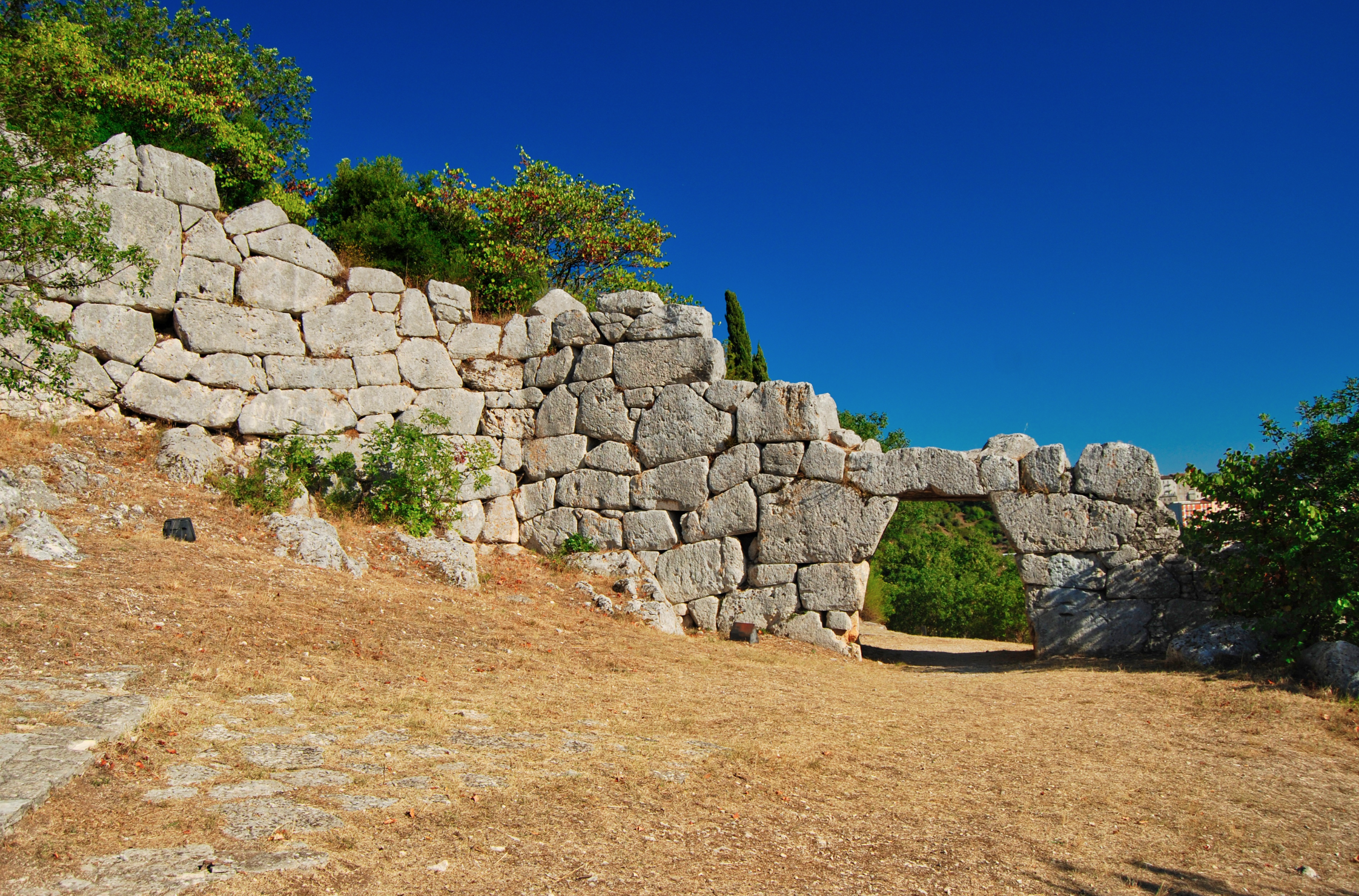
Ancient Porta maggiore

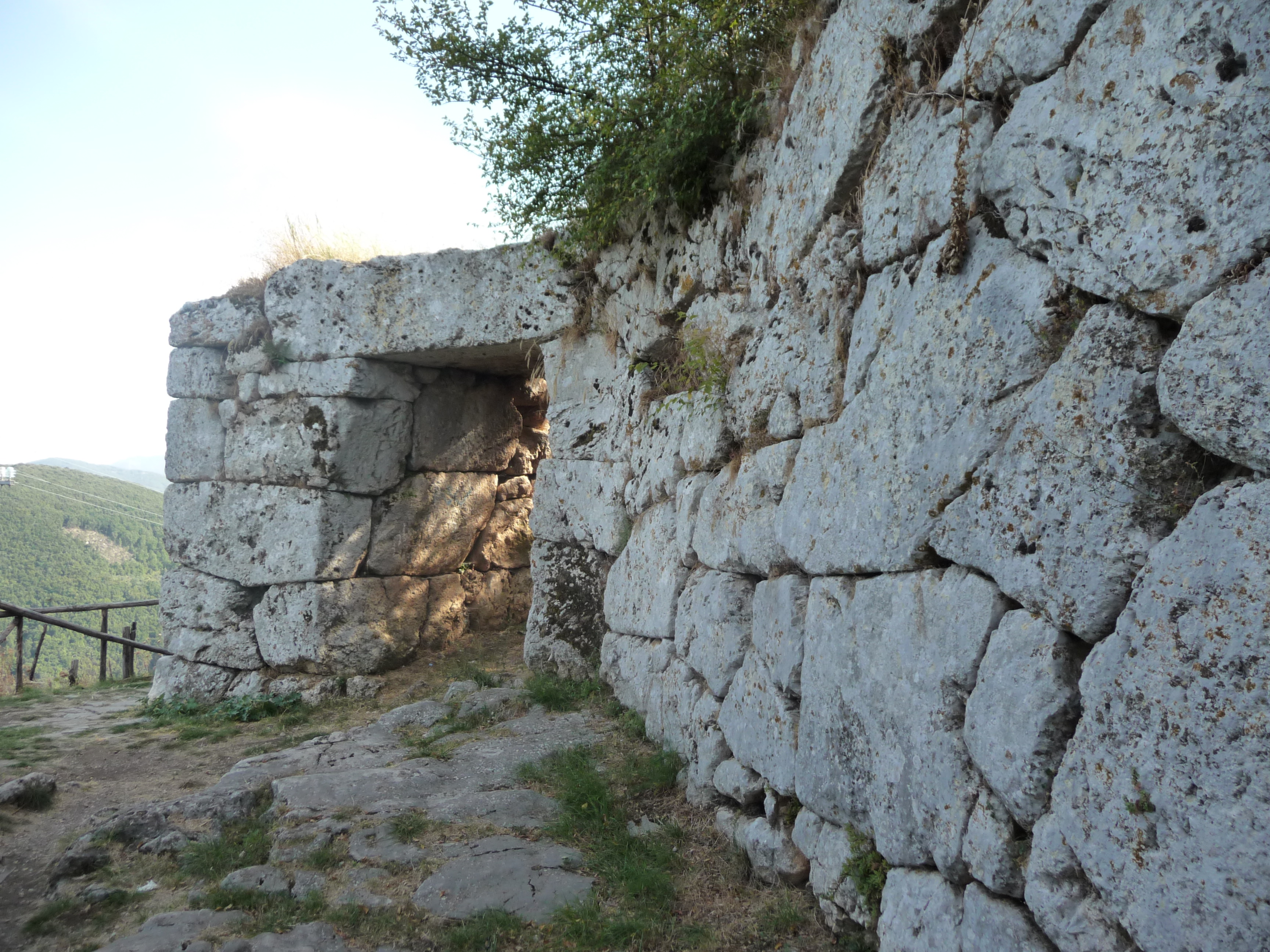
Ancient Porta Foca

According to ancient Roman sources, Lucius Tarquinius Superbus, the seventh king of Rome, established a Roman colony at the town, then known as Signia. Additional colonists were reportedly sent there in 495 BC.

The ancient architectural remains include a circuit of fortification walls built using polygonal masonry. The walls incorporated a system of gates, including the Porta Saracena which is covered by a large monolithic architrave. Atop the ancient acropolis of Segni sits the podium of the temple of Juno Moneta, which now supports a Medieval church of Saint Peter (tenth century).

The Santa Lucia complex was recently recognized as a massive structure consisting of vaulted rooms, which deserves to be included among the grandiose architectural achievements of the second half of the 2nd century BC, and features a vault impost marked by a projecting tuff cornice. Also a nymphaeum designed by Quintus Mucius has a number of niches with tuff piers.

=== Later history ===
Segni was a refuge for various popes with Pope Eugene III erecting a palace in the middle of the twelfth century. The Counts of Marsi, hereditary enemies of the Orsini, obtained Segni in the twelfth century. The family called de' Conti produced several popes (Innocent III, Gregory IX and Alexander IV) and many cardinals. In 1558 Segni was sacked by the forces of the Duke of Alba in the war against Pope Paul IV; immense booty was captured, as the inhabitants of the other towns of the Campagna had fled thither.

== Main sights ==
- The polygonal masonry fortification walls of the settlement are well preserved.
- The site of the Juno Moneta temple marks the ancient Segni acropolis which has recently been the site of renewed fieldwork undertaken by the British School at Rome.
- Co-cathedral of Santa Maria Assunta, built in the early 17th century on the former temple of St. Bruno. The bell tower is from the 11th century. The interior has a painting by Francesco Cozza.

== Twin towns ==
- Mykines, Greece
