= Norba =

Ancient Town in Italy

Coordinates: 41°35′30″N 12°57′37″E

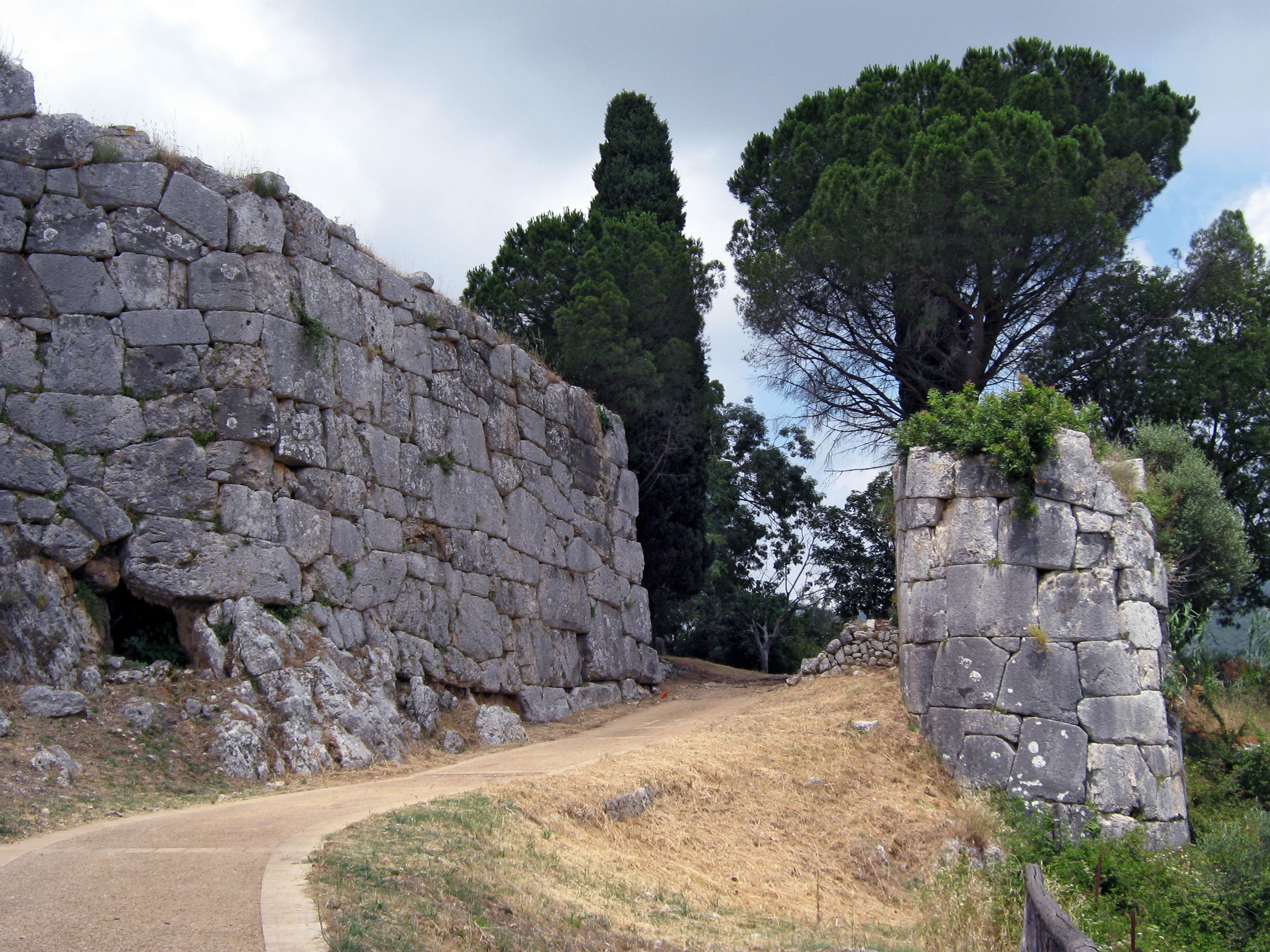
- "Porta Maggiore", the main gate of Norba

- Location within Lazio
- Type: Settlement
- Periods: Roman Republic
- Cultures: Ancient Rome
- Location: Comune di Norma, Lazio, Italy
- Region: Lazio

History
- Built: 492 BC

Site notes
- Excavation dates: yes
- Archaeologists: Raniero Mangarelli; Luigi Savignóni; Stefania Quilici Gigli
- Management: Soprintendenza Archeologica per il Lazio
- Public access: yes
- Website: Norba (in Italian)

Norba, an ancient town of Latium (Adjectum), Italy. It is situated 1 mile northwest of the modern town of Norma, on the western edge of the Volscian Mountains or Monti Lepini. The town is perched above a precipitous cliff with a splendid view over the Pomptine Marshes below; the highest point stands to c. 460 meters (over 1,500 feet) above sea level.

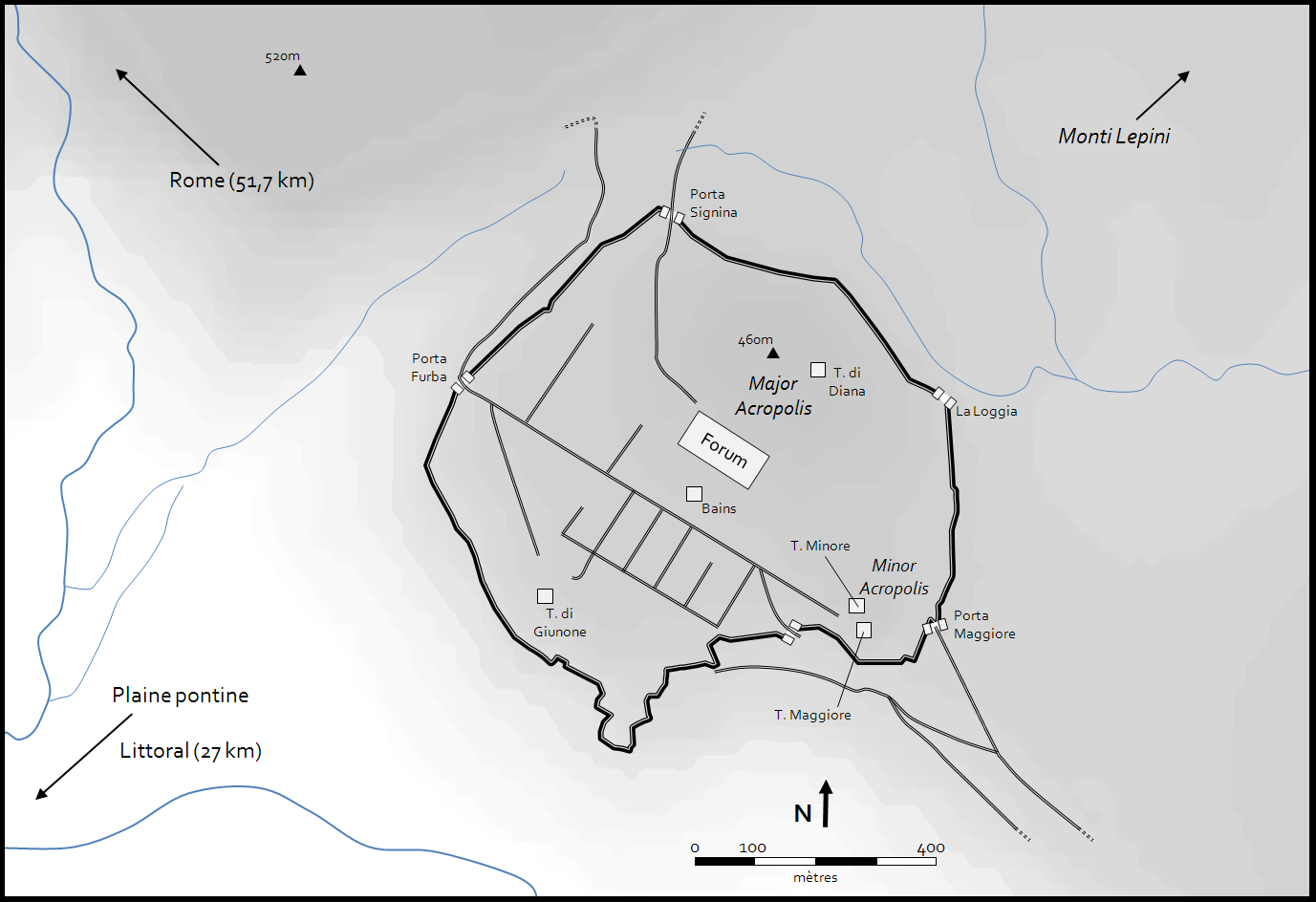
Map of Norba

== History ==
Norba was a member of the Latin League of 499 BC. It became a Roman colony in 492 BC, initially to protect the border with the Volsci, and later serving as an important fortress guarding the Pomptine Marshes. It served in 199 BC as a place of detention for the Carthaginian hostages, and was captured and destroyed by Sulla's troops during the civil wars at the end of 82 BC. By the first century AD Norba is included by Pliny the Elder on his list of extinct cities in Latium.

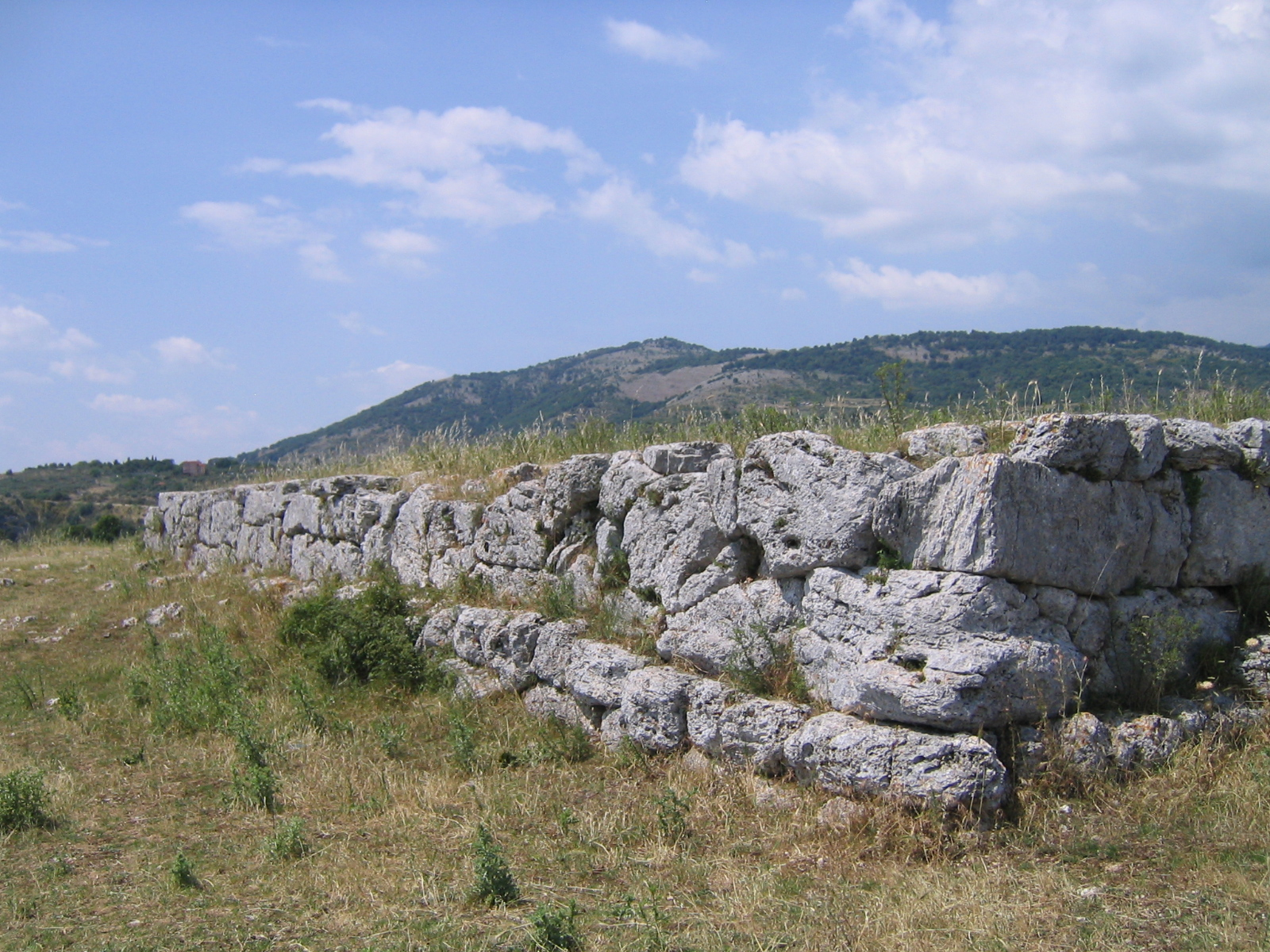
A polygonal masonry temple podium on the Minor Acropolis of ancient Norba

== Archaeology ==
From excavations begun in 1901 it seems clear that the remains now visible on the site are entirely Roman. The well-preserved walls are in the polygonal style, over 2.5 km in circuit, and are entirely embankment walls, not standing free above the internal ground level. The walls enclose an area of approximately 38 hectares. Remains of two towers, and of several gateways (notably the Porta Maggiore, defended by a tower), exist. The bastion at the Porta Maggiore still stands to 13 m. A square tower, referred to as "La Loggia" is also to be found along the curtain.

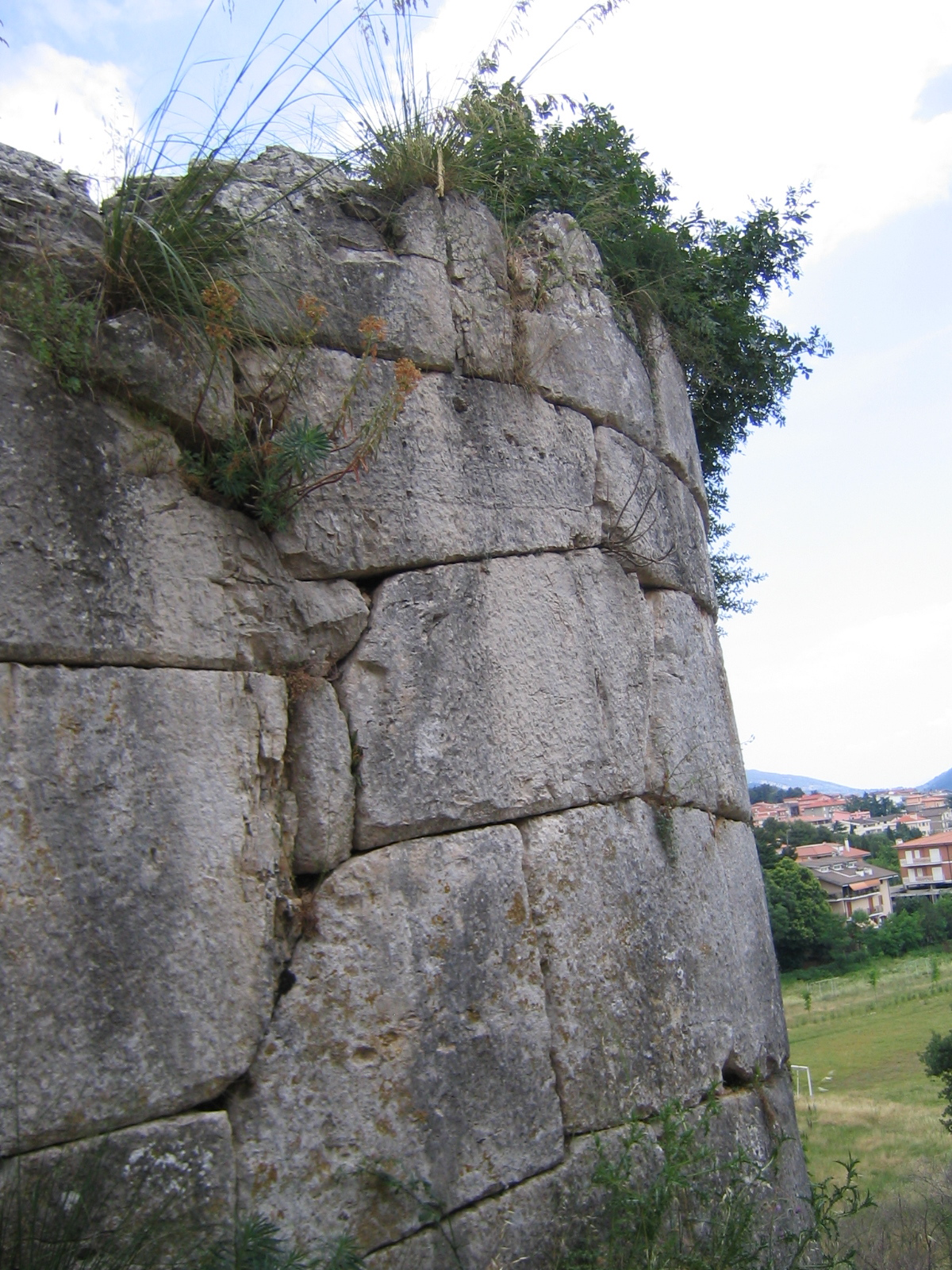
A detail of the polygonal masonry bastion flanking the Porta Maggiore

The main gate is enormous, with jambs over 8 m in height, 4.30 m in width, and internal width of 12.8 m. Within, the remains of several buildings, including the foundations (podia) of two temples, one dedicated to Juno Lucina, have been examined. At the foot of the cliff are the picturesque ruins of the medieval town of Ninfa, (12th-13th centuries) abandoned on account of malaria. The remains of a primitive settlement, on the other hand, have been discovered on the mountainside to the southeast, above the 13th-century abbey of Valvisciolo, where there is a succession of terraces supported by walls of rough polygonal masonry, and approached by a road similarly supported. Here a quantity of primitive pottery has been found. The necropolis of this settlement was probably the extensive one situated at Caracupa (8th-7th century BC), near the railway station of Sermoneta, which belongs also to the 8th-6th century BC, terminating thus at the precise date at which the Roman city of Norba is believed to have been established.

Additional ancient remains are to be found in the hinterland of Norba, including the polygonal masonry structure at Poggio Serrone di Bove.
