= Twelve-angled stone =

Incan archaeological artifact in Peru

Twelve angled stone
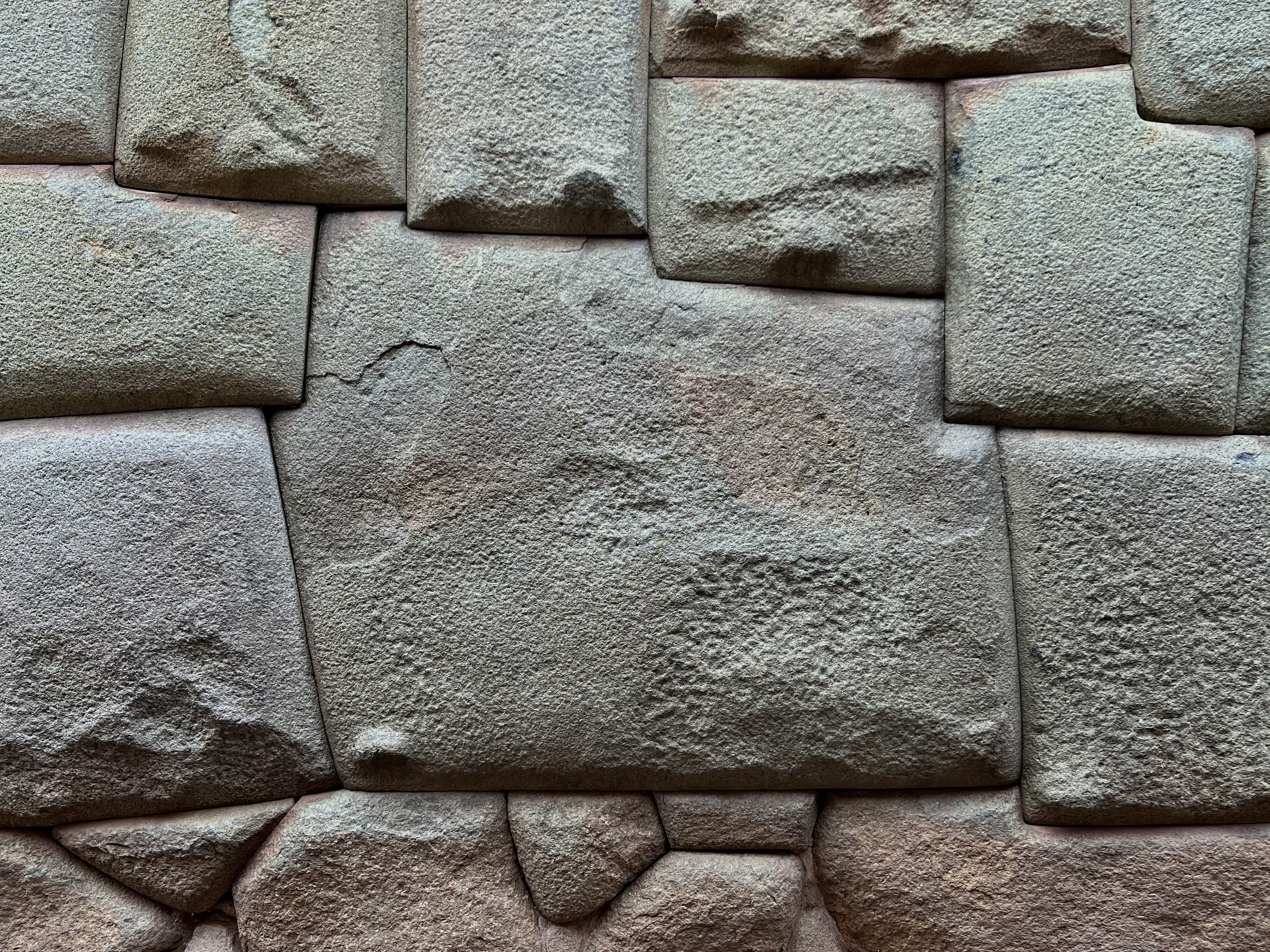
- Interactive map of Twelve angled stone
- 13°30′58″S 71°58′35″W
- Cultures: Inca civilization
- Location: Cuzco Region, Peru
- Part of: Archbishop's palace

UNESCO World Heritage Site
- Part of: City of Cuzco
- Criteria: Cultural: iii, iv
- Reference: 273
- Inscription: 1983 (7th Session)
- Area: Latin America and the Caribbean

Cultural Heritage of Peru
- Type: Immovable tangible
- Criteria: Monument
- Designated: 28 December 1972; 53 years ago
- Part of: Palacio Arzobispal del Cusco
- Legal basis: R.S. Nº 2900-72-ED

The twelve-angled stone is an archeological artifact in Cusco, Peru. It was part of a stone wall of an Inca palace, and is considered to be a national heritage object. The stone is currently part of a wall in the palace of the Archbishop of Cusco.

== Characteristics ==
The twelve-angled stone is composed of a formation of diorite rocks and is recognized by its fine finishing and twelve-angled border, an example of perfectionist Incan architecture. The block is categorized as Cultural Heritage of the Nation of Peru and is located in the city of Cusco, 1105 km from Lima. The stone is a great example of Inca knowledge in the evolution of construction. There are other stones with the same vertices but the twelve-angled stone is the most famous.

As an example of the Incas' advanced stonework, the stone is a popular tourist attraction in Cusco and a site of pride for many locals. The perfectly cut stone is part of a wall known as the Hatun Rumiyoc, which makes up the outside of the Archbishop's palace.

== Damage ==
On 18 February 2025, a man believed to be under the influence of alcohol or drugs was arrested after hitting the stone with a hammer, causing "irreversible damage" and breaking off multiple fragments.

== See also ==
- Inca architecture
- Inca civilization
- List of individual rocks
