= Coricancha =

Archaeological site in Peru

- Qorikancha or Qurikancha (Cusco Quechua)
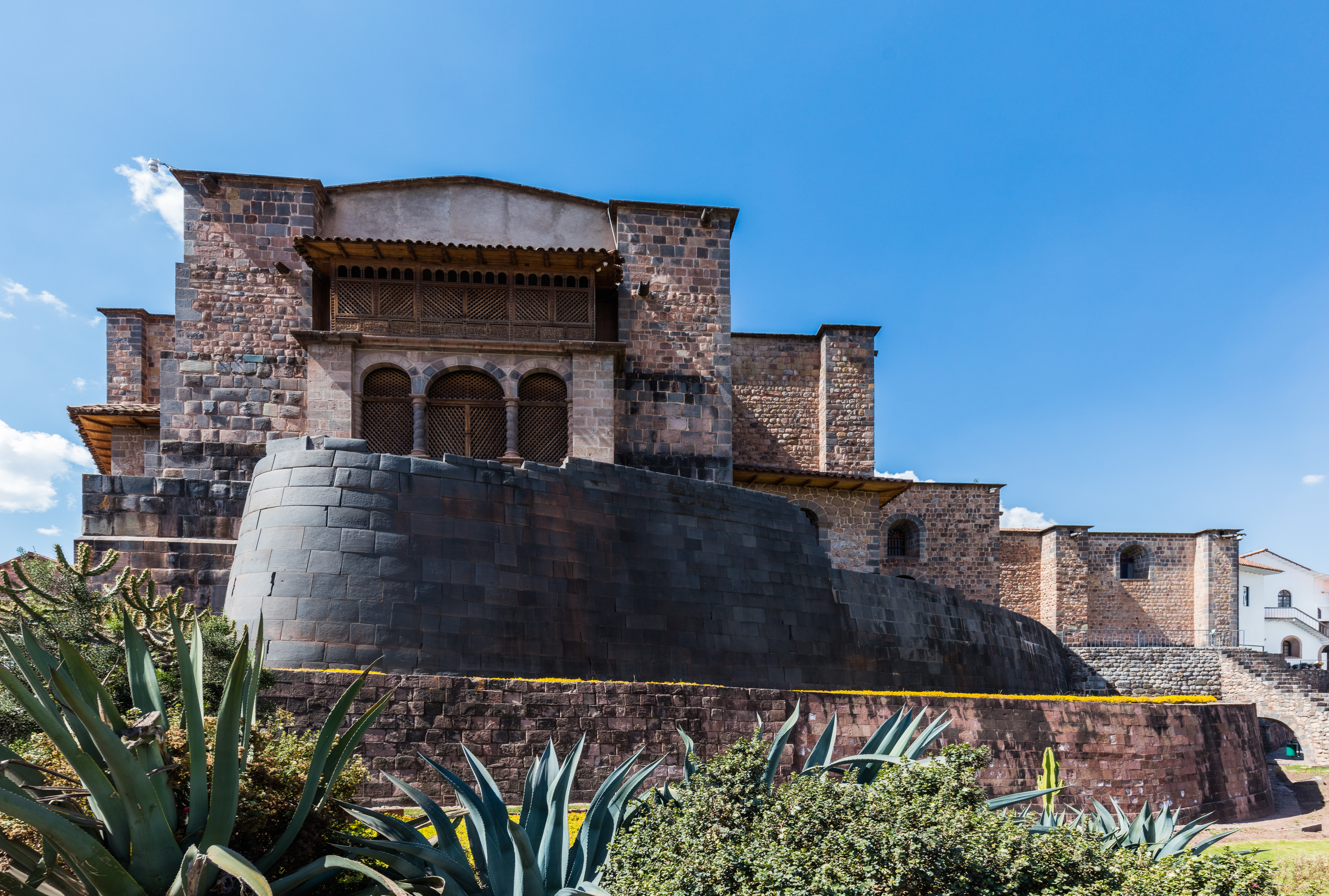
- Coricancha with the Church and Convent of Santo Domingo above

- Location within Peru
- Interactive map of Coricancha
- 13°31′12″S 71°58′32″W
- Type: Sanctuary
- Periods: Late Horizon
- Cultures: Inca
- Location: Peru; Cusco
- Region: Andes

Site notes
- Elevation: 3,400 m (11,200 ft)
- Condition: Preserved
- Management: Peruvian Ministry of Culture; Dominican Order

UNESCO World Heritage Site
- Part of: City of Cuzco
- Criteria: Cultural: iii, iv
- Reference: 273
- Inscription: 1983 (7th Session)
- Area: Latin America and the Caribbean

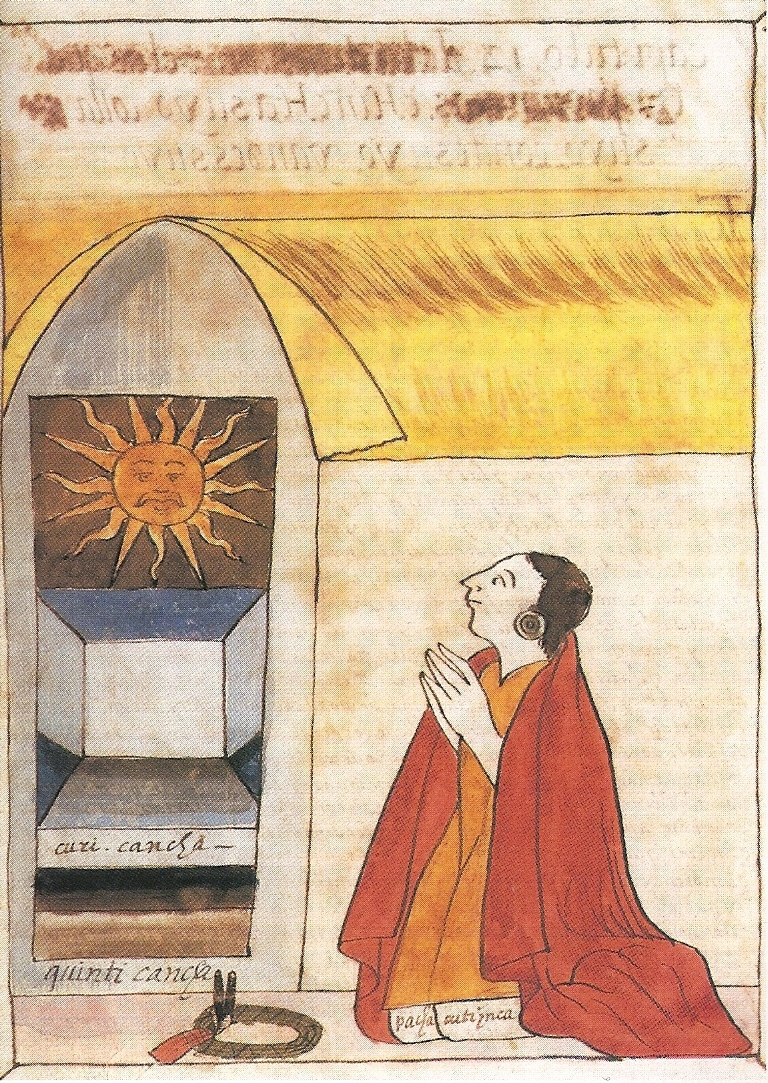
Depiction of Pachacuti worshipping Inti (the Sun god) at Coricancha, in the 17th century second chronicles of Martín de Murúa

The Coricancha (Note: Also spelled variously as Curicancha, Koricancha, Qoricancha, Qorikancha, among others.) (Cusco Quechua: Quri Kancha, lit. 'golden temple', pronounced [ˈqɔɾi ˈkantʃa]) was the most important temple in the Inca Empire, and was described by early Spanish colonialists. It is located in Cusco, Peru, which was the capital of the empire.

== History ==
Originally named Intikancha or Intiwasi, it was dedicated to Inti (the Sun god of the Inca), and is located at the former Inca capital of Cusco. The High Priest resided in the temple and offered up the ordinary sacrifices, accompanied by religious rites, with the help of other priests. Most of the temple was destroyed after the 16th-century war with the Spanish conquistadors, as settlers also took it apart to build their own churches and residences. Much of its stonework was used as the foundation for the seventeenth-century Church and Convent of Santo Domingo, which was built after the 1650 earthquake destroyed the first Dominican convent.

To construct Coricancha, the Inca used ashlar masonry, building from the placement of similarly sized cuboid stones that they hand cut and shaped for this purpose. The use of ashlar masonry made the temple much more difficult to construct, as the Inca did not use any stone with a slight imperfection or break. By choosing this masonry type, the Inca intentionally demonstrated the importance of the building through the extent of the labor necessary to build the structure. Through the arduous labor needed to construct buildings with ashlar masonry, this form of construction came to signify the Inca's imperial power to mobilize and direct local labor forces. The replication throughout Andean South America of Inca architectural techniques, such as those employed at Coricancha, expressed the extent of Inca control over a vast geographic region.

Pachakuti Inca Yupanqui rebuilt Cusco and the House of the Sun, enriching it with more oracles and edifices, and adding plates of fine gold. He provided vases of gold and silver for the Mama-cunas, nuns or cloistered women, to use in the veneration services. These celibate girls and women were mostly employed in weaving and in dyeing woollen cloth for the service of the temple, as well as in making chicha. Finally, he took the bodies of the seven deceased Incas and adorned them with masks, head-dresses, medals, bracelets, and sceptres of gold, placing them on a golden bench.

The walls were once covered in sheets of gold, and the adjacent courtyard was filled with golden statues. Spanish reports tell of an opulence that was "fabulous beyond belief". When the Spanish in 1533 required the Inca to raise a ransom in gold for the life of their Emperor Atahualpa, most of the gold was collected from Coricancha.

...the temple in the whole edifice was of excellent masonry, the stones very well placed and fixed. Some of the stones were very large. There was no mortar, either of earth or lime, but a sort of bitumen with which they used to fix their stones. The stones themselves are so well worked that no joining or cement can be seen.

=== Acquisition by Spain ===
The Spanish colonists built the Church and Convent of Santo Domingo on the site, demolishing the temple and using its foundations for the cathedral. They also used parts of the temple for other churches and residences. Construction took most of a century. This is one of numerous sites where the Spanish incorporated Inca stonework into the structure of a colonial building. Major earthquakes severely damaged the church, but the Inca stone walls, built out of huge, tightly interlocking blocks of stone, still stand due to their sophisticated stone masonry. Nearby is an underground archaeological museum that contains mummies, textiles, and sacred idols from the site.

Today, at the Convent of Santo Domingo, are four remaining rooms of the ancient temple with sloping walls, in which there can still be seen broken stone relics from the House of the Sun (Inti-huasi), consisting primarily of blocks of grey andesite stone, of diorite stone and of limestone rock that had been carved and formed into ceremonial niches, or used for walls and canals. In one of the blocks belonging to the second course of stones, three holes can be seen that possibly served to drain rainwater from the patio or from the chicha libation. According to the experiments conducted by Peruvian folklorist, Augusto León Barandiarán, one can hear the musical notes D, A and G when the holes are struck with an instrument. The outer wall of the temple is made up of blocks of pink and grey granite stone, the interior surface of which showing signs of a vitrified layer that allowed for the reflection of light at night.

== Inca astronomy ==
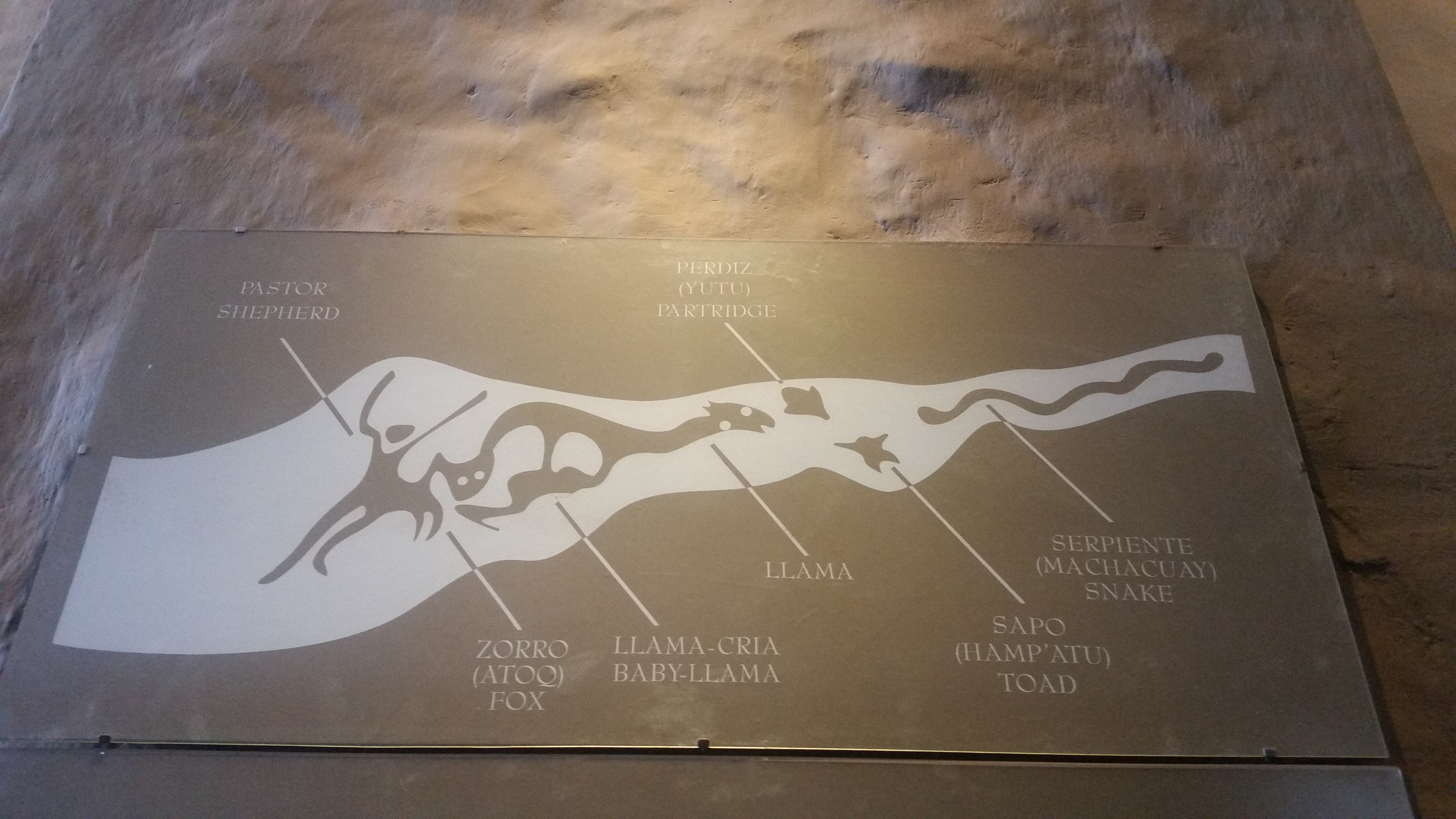
Inca constellations in the Milky Way

Similarities are found in the semicircular temples found in the Temple of the Sun in Cusco, the Torreon in Machu Picchu, and the Temple of the Sun in Písac. In particular, all three exhibit a "parabolic enclosure wall" of the finest stonework, as Bingham describes it. These structures were also used for similar purposes, including the observation of solstices and Inca constellations.

Within the Milky Way, which the Inca called mayu or Celestial River, the Inca distinguished dark area or clouds, which they called yana phuyu. These were considered silhouettes or shadows of animals drinking from the river water. Amongst the animals named by the Inca, was a llama extended from Scorpius to Alpha Centauri and Beta Centauri, in which those two stars formed the llama's eyes, or llamaq ñawin. A baby llama, llama-cría, was inverted underneath. To the left of the llamas is a red-eyed fox, atuq, which lies between Sagittarius and the tail of Scorpius. The tail of Scorpius is known as a storehouse, or qullqa. A partridge, yutu, was just below the Southern Cross, and a toad, hamp'atu, to the lower right. A serpent, machaguay, extends off to the right.

During the Inti Raymi, the Sapa Inca and curacas would proceed from the Haucaypata, where they greeted the rising June solstice sun, to the inner court of the Coricancha. On a bench in the "sun room", the Sapa Inca sat with the mummies of his ancestors. This and other rooms were oriented northeast–southwest, shingled in gold plate, and embedded with emeralds and turquoise. Focusing the sun's rays with a concave mirror, the Sapa Inca would light a fire for the burnt sacrifice of llamas. Children were also sacrificed in certain circumstances; they were brought to Cusco following a ceque and huaca route of tribute.

The Coricancha is located at the confluence of two rivers, one of which being the Huatanay River which is now highly polluted. Here, according to Inca myth, is where Manco Cápac decided to build the Coricancha, the foundation of Cusco, and the eventual Inca Empire. According to Ed Krupp, "The Inca built the Coricancha at the confluence because that place represented terrestrially the organizing pivot of heaven."

== Gallery ==
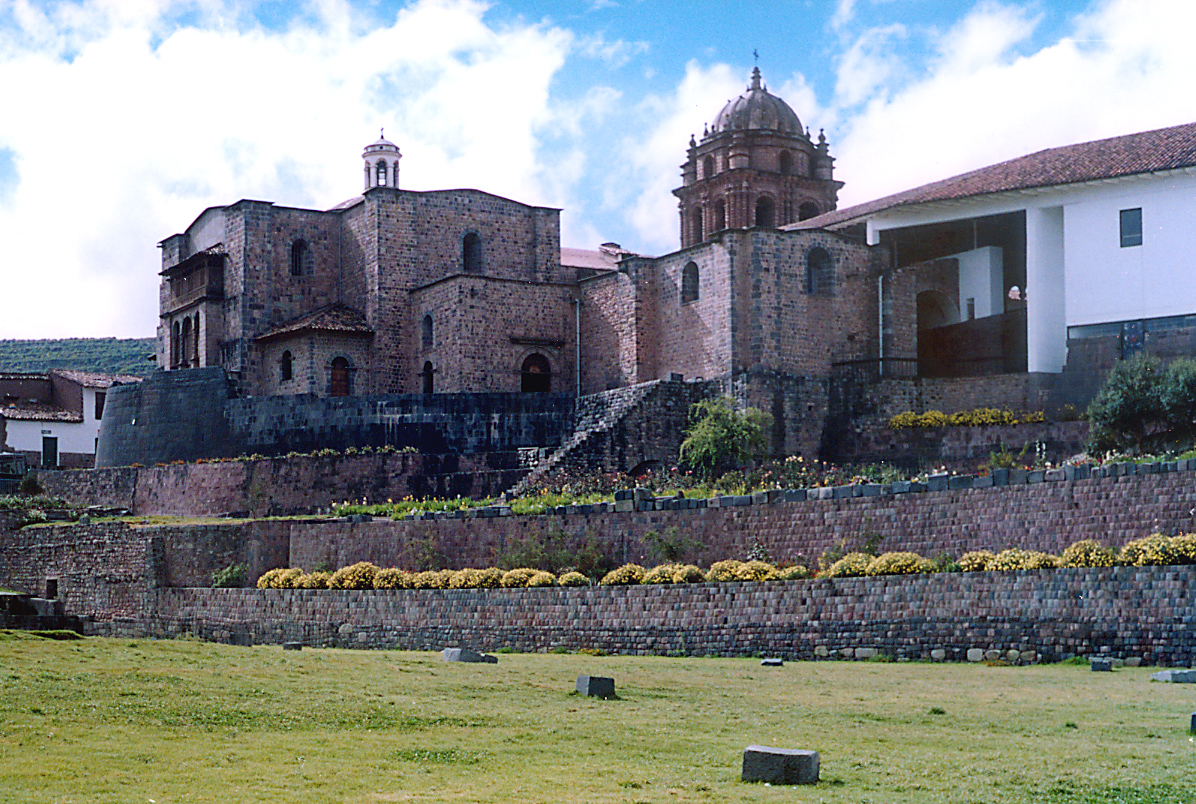
Coricancha, Convent of Santo Domingo, and courtyard (Intipampa)

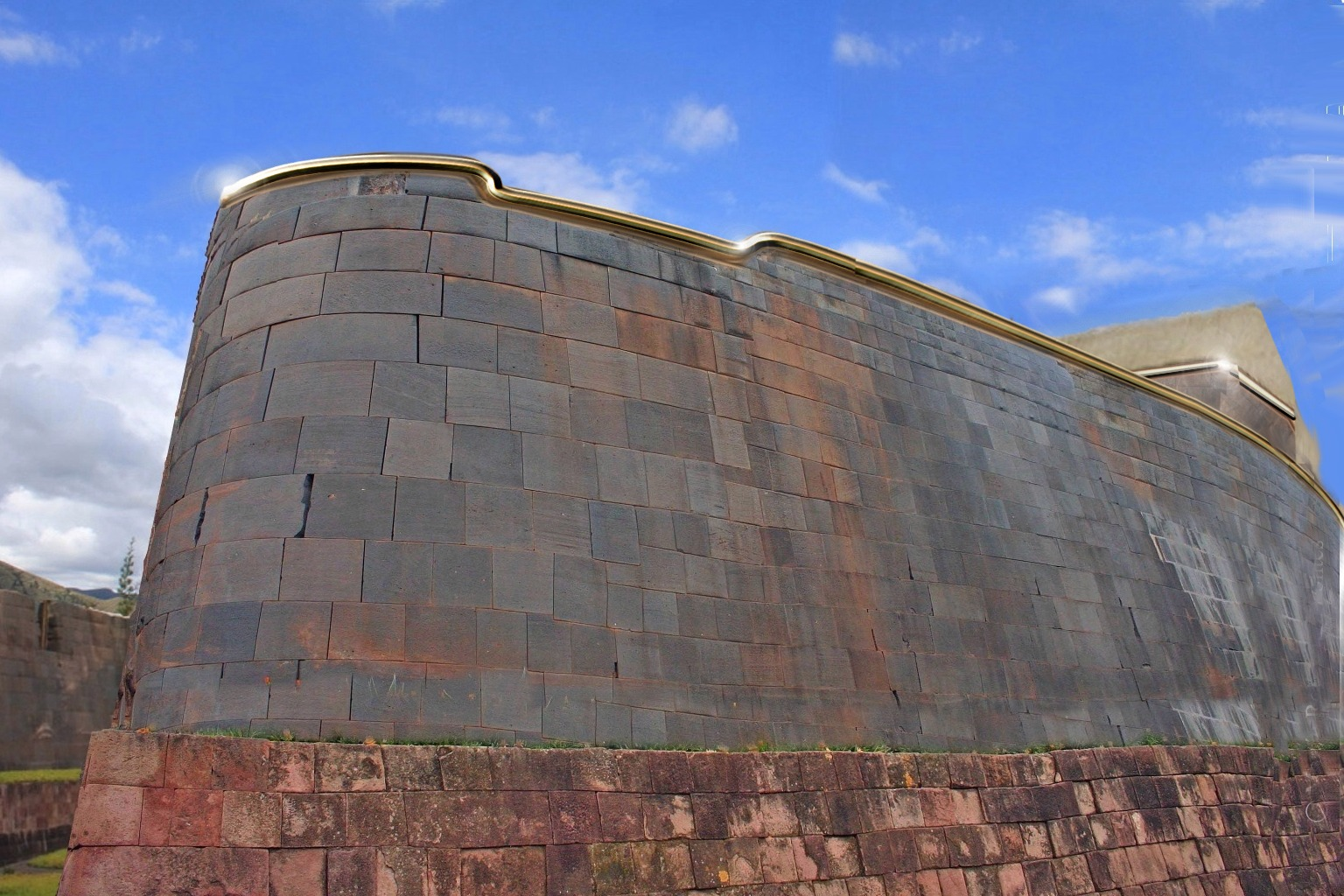
A digital reconstruction of its base during the Inca period

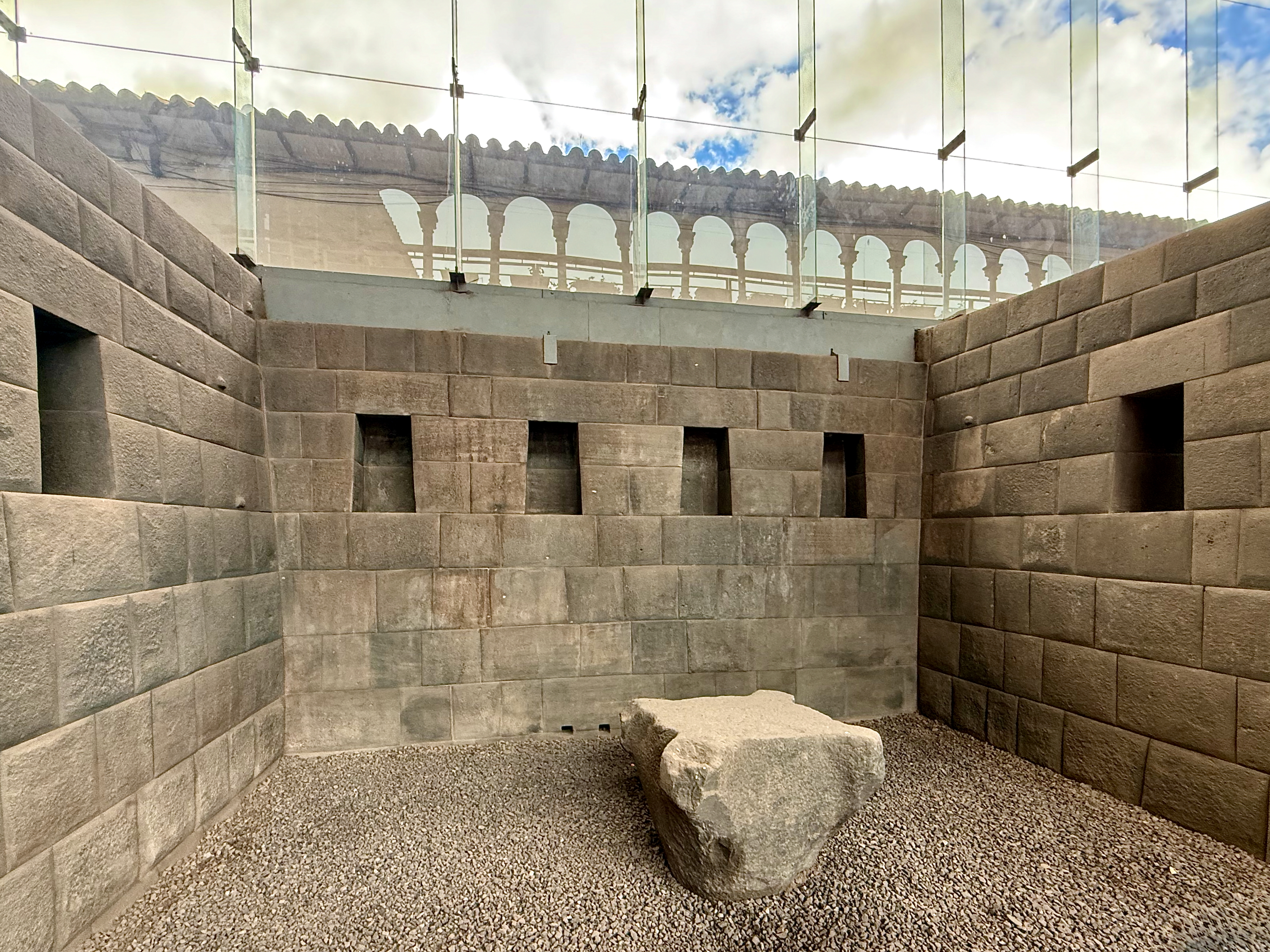
One of the original rooms from the Inca period

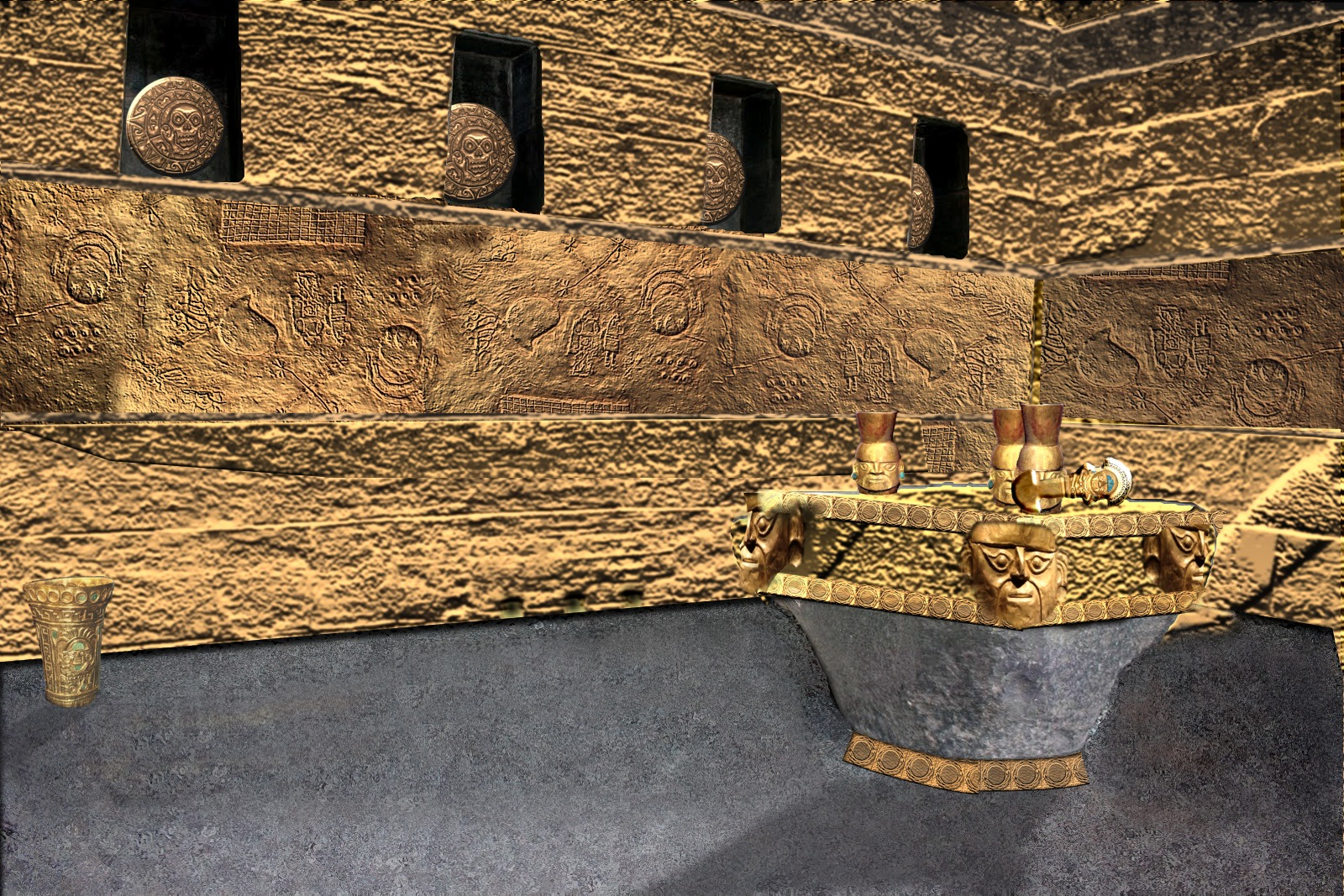
Digital reconstruction of the room filled with gold, according to a description by Inca Garcilaso de la Vega

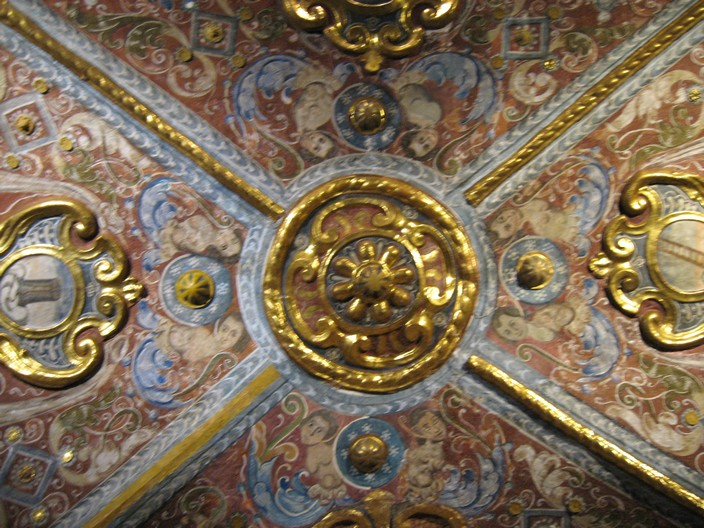
Ceiling ornament

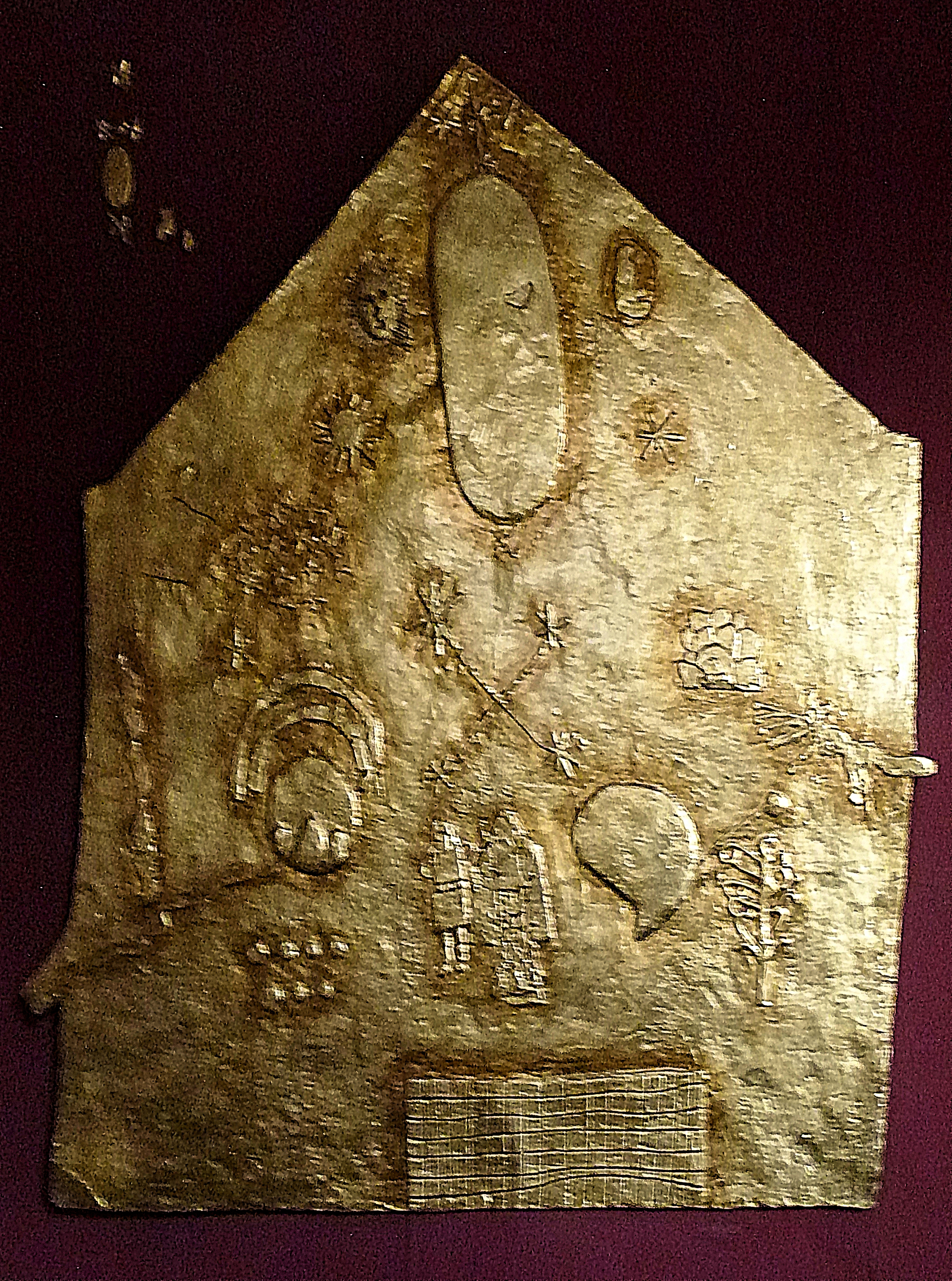
Gold tray representing Inca cosmology

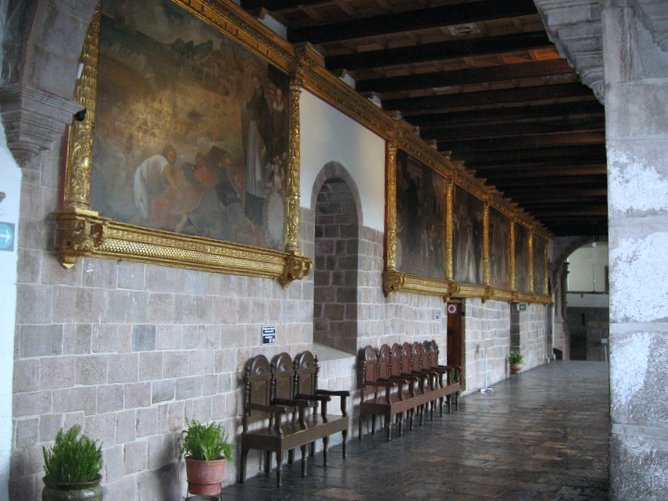
Colonial Cusco School paintings

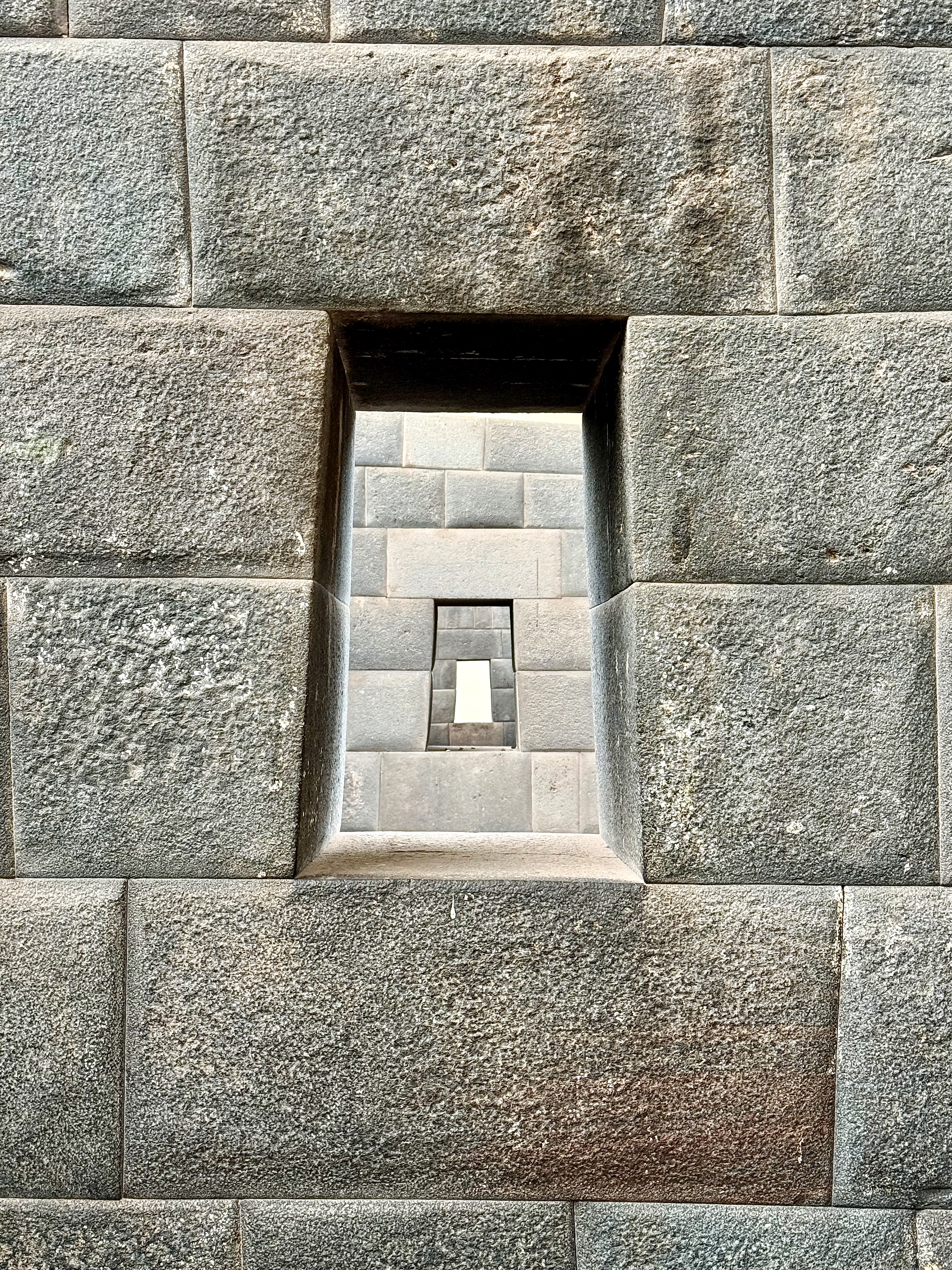
Original trapezoid windows inside the temple

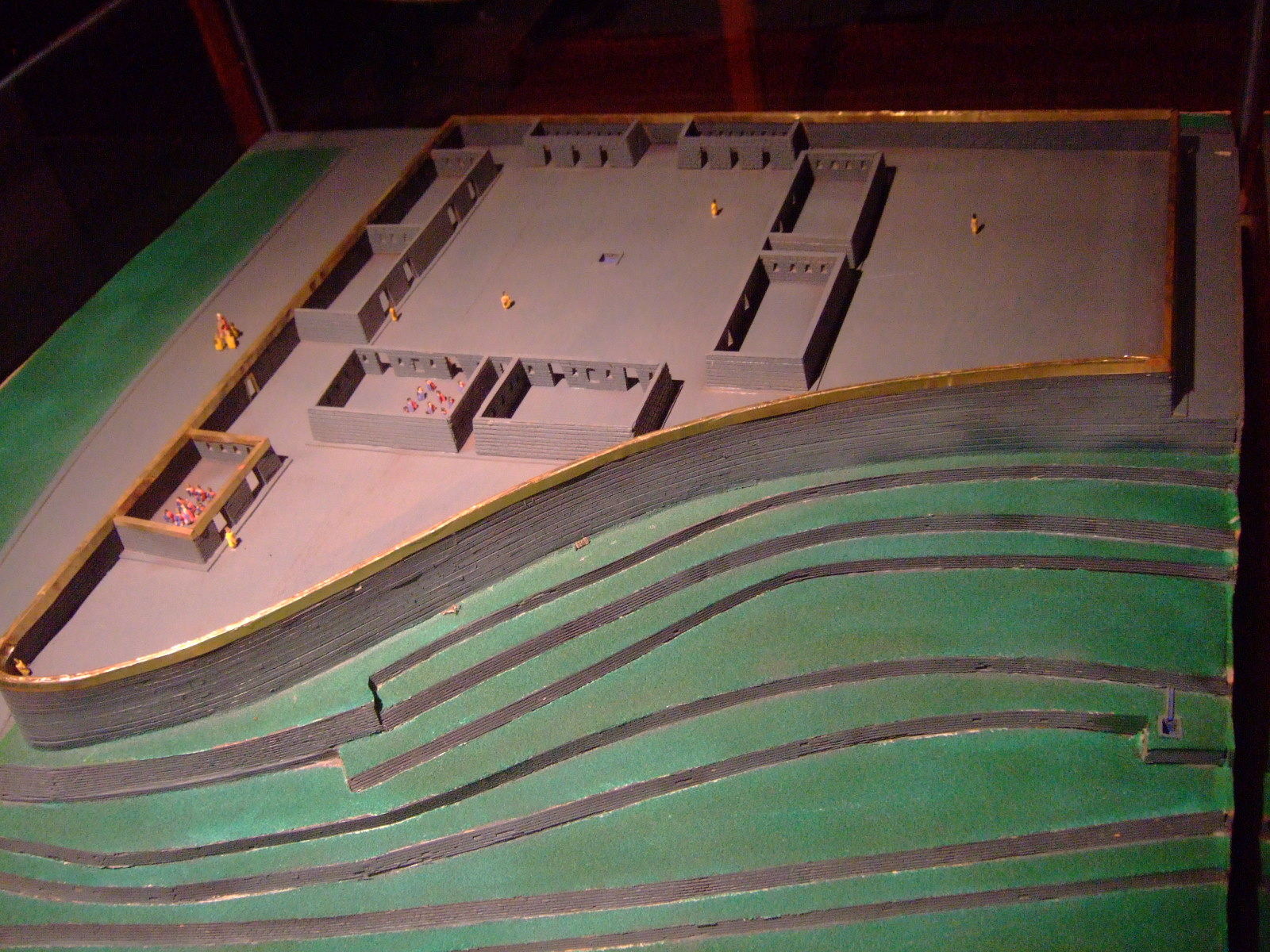
Model of original Qoricancha

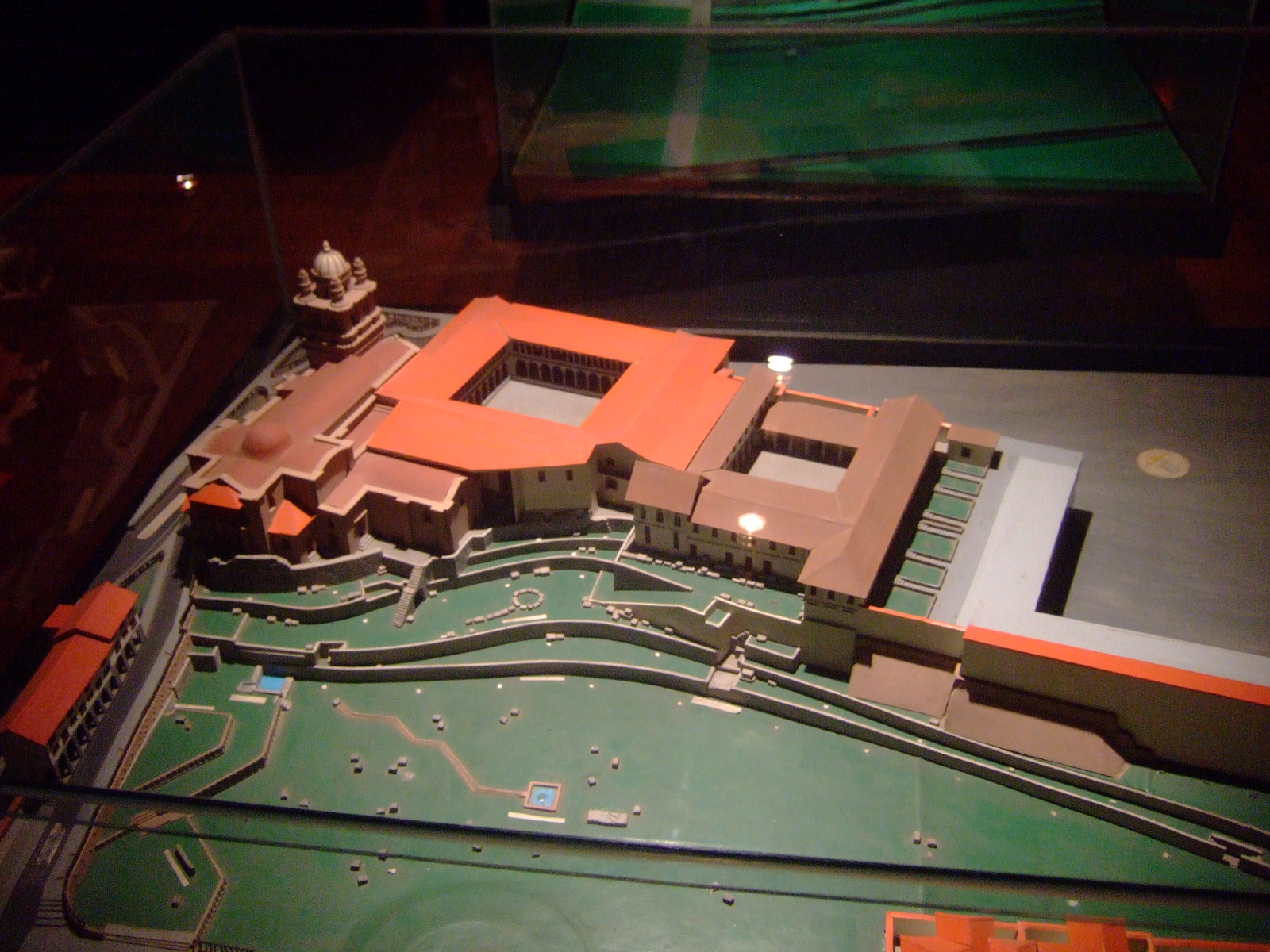
Model of modern Qoricancha

== See also ==
- Church and Convent of Santo Domingo, Cusco
- Pedro Cieza de Leon's The Chronicle of Peru
- Inca Garcilaso de la Vega's Comentarios Reales de los Incas
- Felipe Guamán Poma de Ayala's The First New Chronicle and Good Government
- Iperu, tourist information and assistance
- Tourism in Peru
