= Church and Convent of Santo Domingo, Cusco =

Catholic church of the Dominican Order in Cusco

Church and Convent of Santo Domingo
- Iglesia y Convento de Santo Domingo
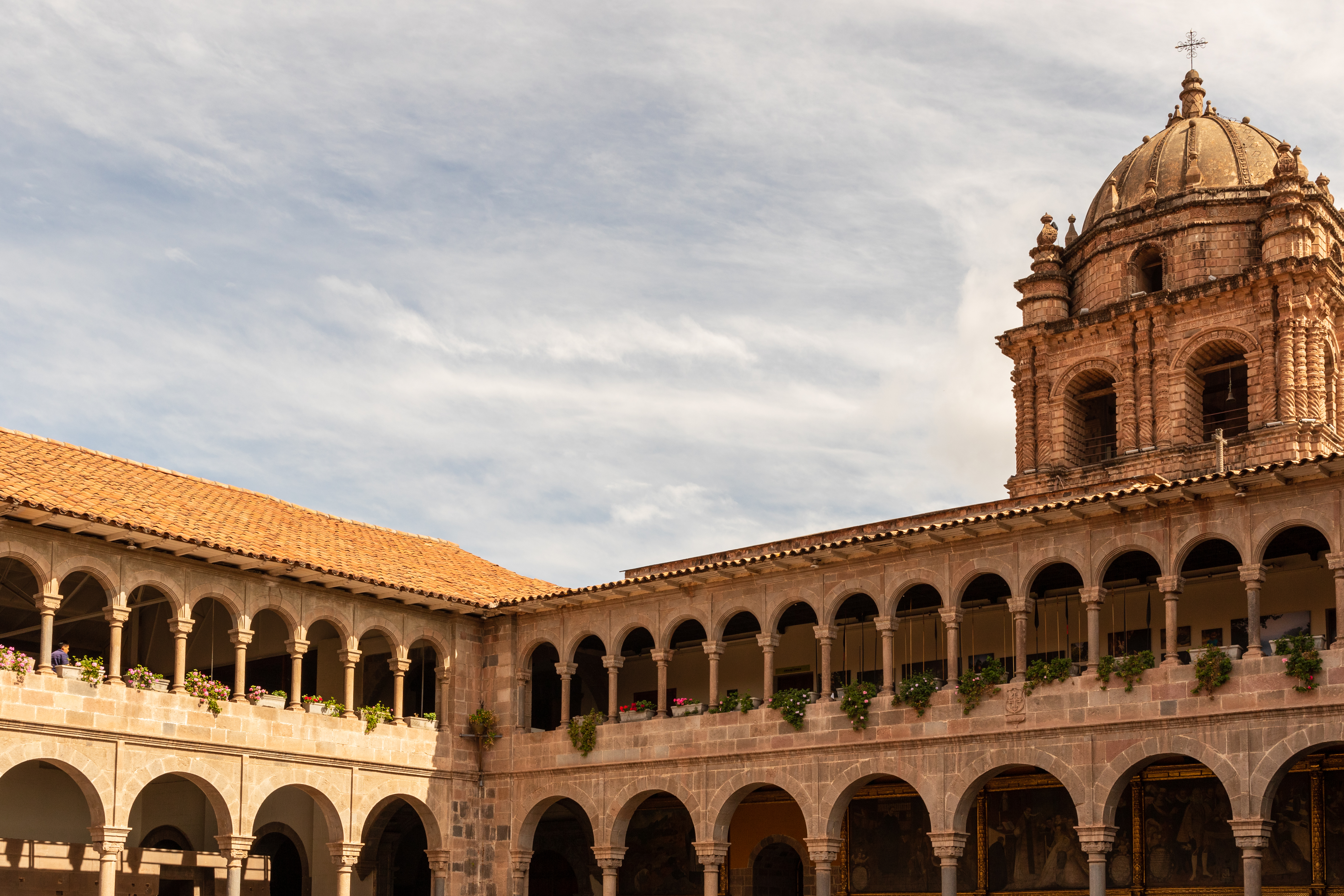
- Interior of the convent in 2019
- Church and Convent of Santo Domingo
- 13°31′37.08″S 71°58′37.24″W
- Location: Cusco, Peru
- Country: Peru
- Denomination: Catholic
- Religious order: Dominican Order

History
- Status: Active
- Dedication: Saint Dominic
- Consecrated: 1633

Architecture
- Functional status: Church and Convent
- Architectural type: Church
- Style: Colonial and Baroque

Administration
- Diocese: Archdiocese of Cusco

UNESCO World Heritage Site
- Part of: City of Cusco
- Criteria: Cultural: iii, iv
- Reference: 273
- Inscription: 1983 (7th Session)
- Area: Latin America and the Caribbean

Cultural Heritage of Peru
- Official name: Iglesia y Convento de Santo Domingo
- Type: Immovable tangible
- Criteria: Monument
- Designated: 28 December 1972; 53 years ago
- Legal basis: R.S. Nº 2900-72-ED

The Church and Convent of Santo Domingo is a 17th-century colonial monastery in the historic centre of Cusco, Peru. It was built on the foundations of the pre-Hispanic Inca temple of Coricancha, originally constructed under Inka Pachacutec. The complex exemplifies the fusion of Inca masonry and Spanish Baroque architecture and comprises a church, two cloisters, and preserved Inca walls. It remains an active Dominican convent and houses a museum of Inca artifacts.

== History ==
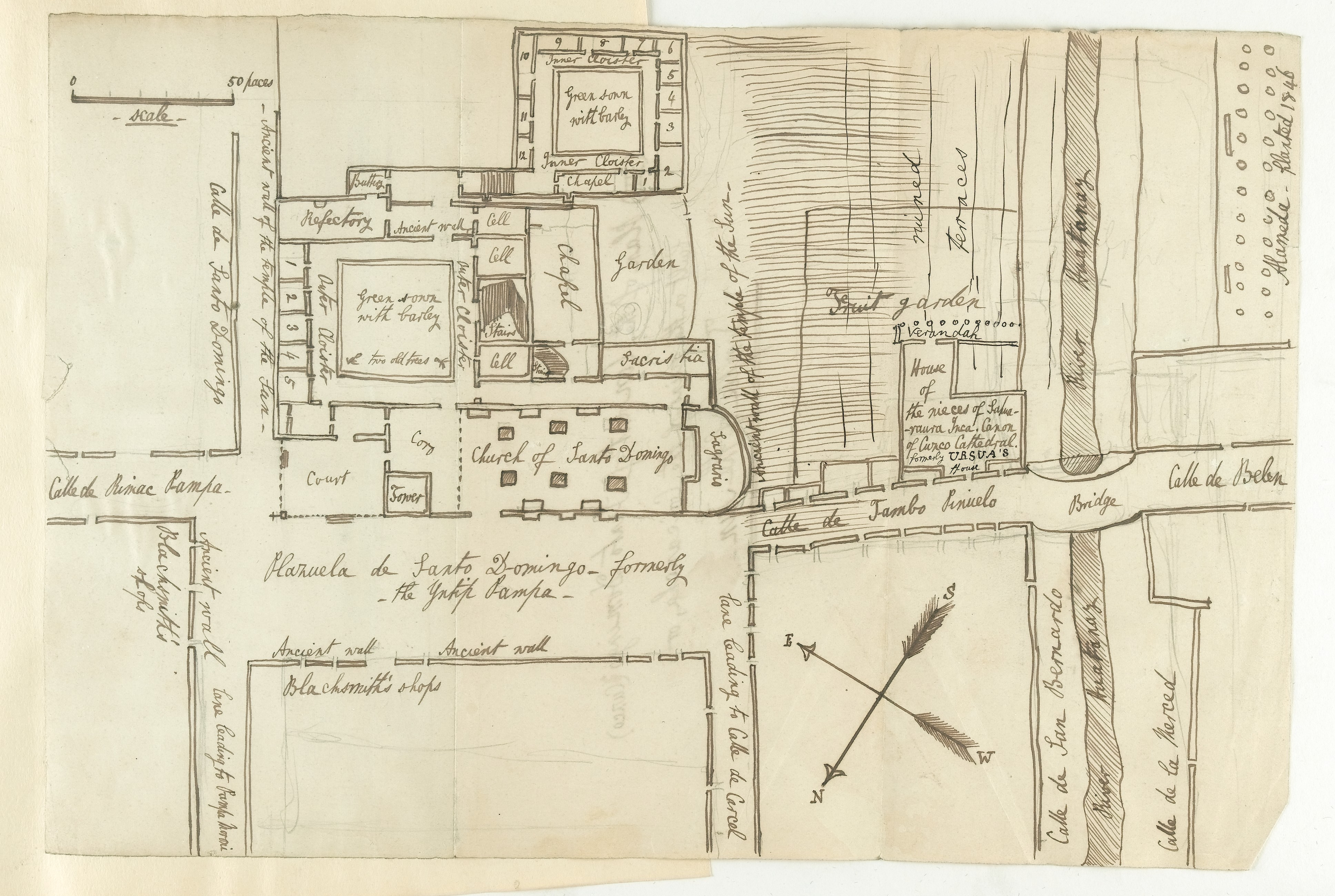
1853 plan of the convent and the church, by Clements R. Markham

In 1538, Juan Pizarro, natural brother of Francisco Pizarro, transferred the Coricancha site to the Dominican Order, assigning it to Fray Juan de Olías and twelve companions from the Province of Santa Cruz de México for the construction of the convent.

The first prior, Friar Juan de Olías, oversaw the establishment and early construction phases, which culminated in the church’s consecration in 1633.

Following the devastating earthquake of 1650, significant repairs were made to the colonial superstructure, leaving the underlying Inca masonry intact.

The Church and Convent suffered extensive damage during the 1950 Cusco earthquake, including collapse of tower arches, cracking of the apse wall, and misalignment of cloister arches. Restoration work was carried out under architect Óscar Ladrón de Guevara, with the principal interventions completed in 1976.

Some sources claim the temple crypts hold the remains of Diego Sayri Túpac and Felipe Túpac Amaru, both Incas of Vilcabamba, and possibly Juan Pizarro, though others say he was buried in the Church of the Triumph.

== Description ==
The complex comprises a church and two cloisters, built atop the remains of the Qoricancha temple, and restored in 1976. The church plan originally followed a Latin cross and was later modified to a basilica form, divided into two colonial blocks:

- Block A: Central nave of greatest height covered by a barrel vault; side naves (Epistle and Gospel) each containing internal chapels with groin vaults; transept and crossing under a lowered dome with a lantern; elevated presbytery on the Inca torreón (main Inca temple bastion) with an open chapel; sacristy and auxiliary chamber flank the presbytery under groin vaults; sub-choir and choir covered by lunette vaults; cedar choir stalls and Sevillian tile decoration.
- Block B: Single tower located on the Epistle side, collapsed in 1950 and rebuilt within a concealed reinforced concrete core.

=== First Cloister (Blocks C, D, E) ===
- Block C preserves pre-Hispanic evidence: inclined sedimentary masonry walls with trapezoidal openings and niches; traces of mural painting; double-height spaces with metal roof structure.
- Block D houses the main entrance to the convent, an antechamber of three groin-vaulted bays, and the north gallery; east and west arcades of round arches on Ionic columns with stone plinths; first-floor mural canvases depicting the life of Saint Dominic and a Neoclassical stone altar; artesonado ceilings on both levels, including high-relief cherub motifs.
- Block E comprises the south gallery mirroring Block D’s features: first-floor frescoes of Saint Dominic’s life and death, two Neoclassical stone altars, restricted-access second-floor gallery behind wrought-wood grilles; first-level Profundis room and refectory under groin vaults and basket-handle arches, now serving as a pinacoteca.
