= Mama Ocllo =

Andean deity

- Motherhood and Fertility
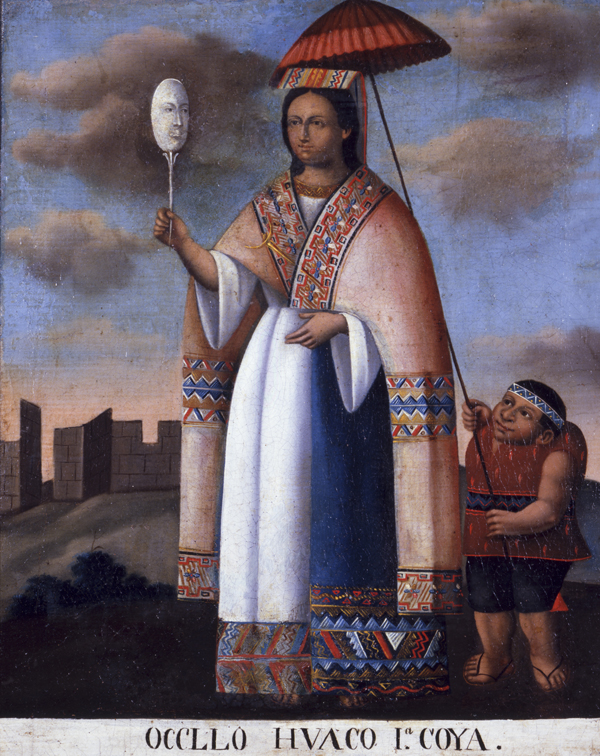
- Mama Ocllo, anonymous oil on canvas painting from Peru, circa 1840, San Antonio Museum of Art.
- Other names: Mama Cora Ocllo, Mama Ogllo, Mama Oello, Mama Oella, Mama Oullo, Mama Occlo, Mama Okllo or Mama Uqllu.

Genealogy
- Parents: Inti and Mama Killa or Viracocha and Mama Qucha
- Siblings: Ayar Uchu, Ayar Cachi, Ayar Anca, Manco Cápac, Mama Huaco, Mama Ipacura, and Mama Raua
- Consort: Manco Cápac
- Offspring: Sinchi Roca

In Inca mythology, Mama Ocllo, or more precisely Mama Uqllu, was deified as a mother and fertility goddess. In one legend she was a daughter of Inti and Mama Killa, and in another the daughter of Viracocha (Wiraqucha) and Mama Qucha. In all of them she was the older sister and wife of Manco Cápac (Manqu Qhapaq), whom she established the city of Cusco with. In some variations, she also had a son with him, Sinchi Roca, though all Incan rulers after Manco Cápac were believed to be their descendants.

According to most stories, Mama Occlo and Manco Cápac were sent by Inti to help the Inca by expanding their knowledge after he saw how poorly they were living. After their creation, most legends state, they began journeying to find the perfect location to begin their task, and would know when they had found it when the golden rod Inti had given both his children sank into the ground. Once the rod had sunk, they began educating the Inca people; together they taught the people to better construct homes; Mama Ocllo taught the Inca women the art of spinning thread, sewing, and household duties.

== Origin ==
There are multiple variations of Mama Ocllo's origin. One common version involves Mama Ocllo emerging with Manco Cápac from an island or cave in Lake Titicaca after Inti created them, though in some alternate versions, the rest of their siblings, as well as ten ayllus, rise from the lake, too, and they all journey together for a short time. Some myths depict Mama Ocllo and Manco Cápac's place of origin to be from the Rock of Origins, which is a location described as sacred. Some accounts also state that both Mama Ocllo and Manco Cápac were Inti's children by the Moon.

Another account tells how Mama Ocllo and her siblings were all brought into existence by Inti, though this time they emerged from the middle of three windows on a cave known as Pacariqtambo, and were given a sign when they approached the land they were supposed to settle on rather than a rod to prod the ground with.

Instead of Inti, one legend says that Mama Ocllo is the daughter of Viracocha and Mama Qucha, making her a sibling of Inti.

There are historical accounts, including those recorded by Vasco Núñez de Balboa, Juan de Betanzos, and Fray Martin de Morua, that described Mama Ocllo and Manco Cápac as leaders of a group of people (the Ayar clan) who came from the Tampu Tocco area.

== Founding of Cuzco ==
According to the legend, Mama Ocllo and Manco Capac were given a golden scepter to help them find an ideal place to settle and worship the sun. After their wanderings, the pair descended into a valley. They decided to build the city of Cuzco after the golden rod they brought with them sank into the soil and disappeared. The pair then set out to gather people and brought them to the city. They instructed them in the ways of human beings and the people were divided according to whether they could gather food or build houses. The people also built the Coricancha (temple of the Sun), also referred to as the Intihuasi, at the center of the new imperial city or - as some sources say - where the rod disappeared.
