= Kon (Pre-Incan mythology) =

God of rain and wind

In Pre-Incan mythology, Kón (Con) was the god of rain and wind that came from the North. He is thought to be a deity to the Paracas Civilization, who was later adopted into Nazca and Incan mythology through different names. He was a son of Inti (the sun god) and Mama Killa ("mother moon").

== Legend of Kón ==
Paracas Civilization

According to the legend of Kón, he arrived from the North in the beginning of time. Kón was described as a being in the shape of a human, but had no joints or bones. In some legends, he is said to have flown in with the mask of a bird over his face. He came bearing fruit, feline masks, and a staff. He had large eyes, leading to many calling him the "Dios Oculado", meaning "eyed god". He is the son of Inti, sometimes referred to as “the son of the sun”. Because of this, as he wandered the earth, he raised mountains and created valleys at his will. He is said to be the creator of humans, to whom he gave plentiful fruit and bread to survive. Whenever he appeared, he brought rains to the land so that their agriculture and the people would prosper. His only request was that they continue to honor him. The local people would dance and tell his story to appease the great creator. Over time, the humans forgot about Kón and their owed debt to him. This angered Kón, so to punish the humans, he receded their waters, turning the lush land into coastal deserts instead. He took away the rain and left them only a few rivers and lakes to survive.

After some time, another god arrived from the South to challenge Kón, his name was Pachacámac (Pacha Kamaq) and he was another son of Inti. He and Kón fought, and Pachacámac eventually won, casting Kón away. Kón disappeared into the sky and was never heard from again. Pachacámac turned the people of Kón into monkeys, lizards, foxes and birds to live in the Andes and he created new humans to populate the earth. They are believed to represent the struggle between the day (Kón) and the night (Pachacámac). The duo can represent a number of struggles between two opposing forces, such as the sun and the moon & the North and the South.

== Transition to Nazca and Incan Civilizations ==
Nazca Civilization

Although the legend of Kón originated within the Paracas civilization (800 BCE - 100 BCE), it was told and retold by the natives of the

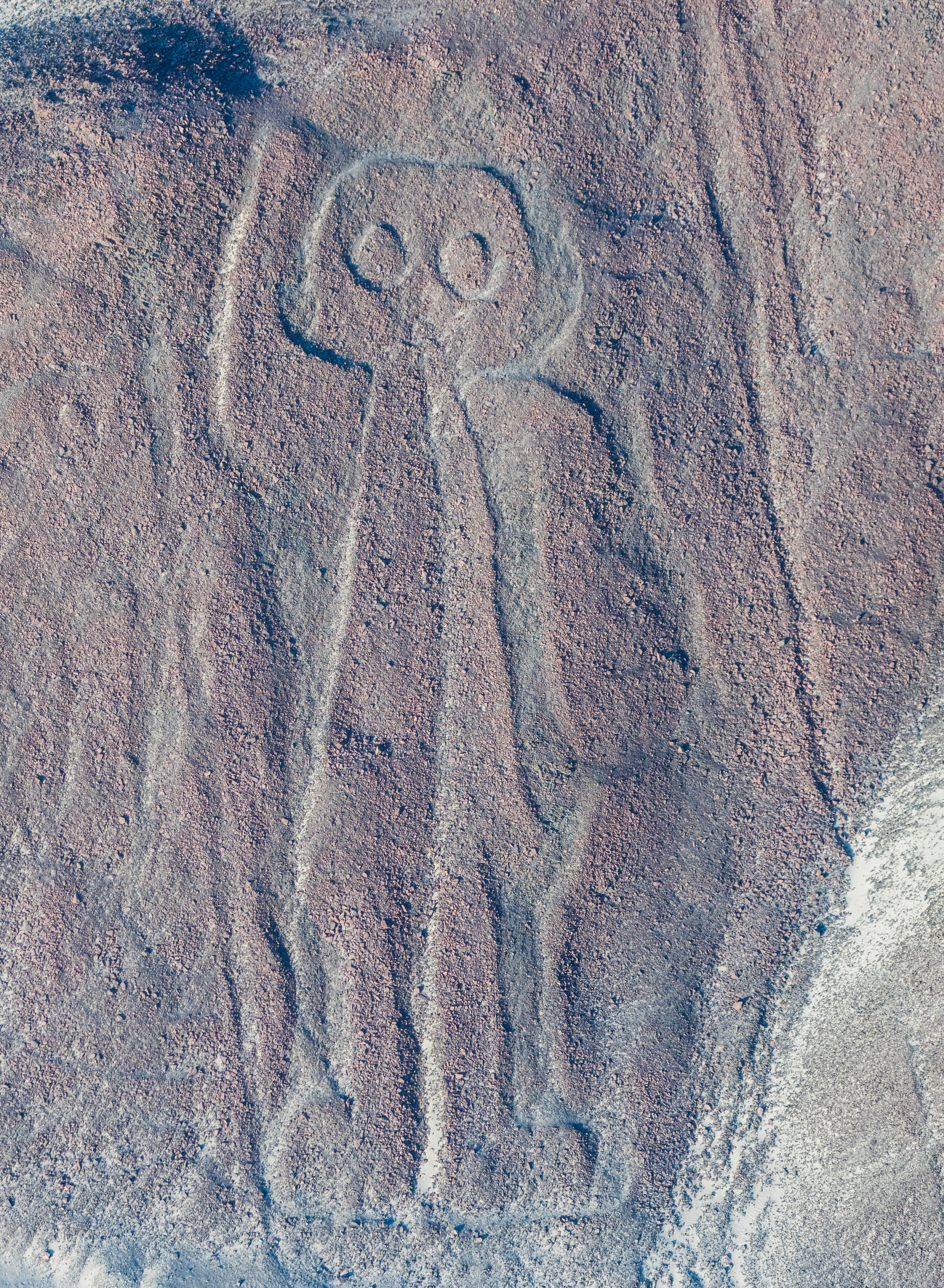
"The Astronaut"

Inca Empire

area in the South-Western area of present-day Perú for centuries. Eventually, when the Paracas civilization fell, the Nazca civilization began (200 BCE - 600 CE). Here, the deity's story was adopted and he was referred to as both "Kón" and "Cuniraya". The Nazca people believed in dancing to appease him. These dances were ceremonial and cultural dances done in repeating patterns. This led to the creation of the Nazca lines to continue to tell the story of the creation. Many believed that the giant geoglyphs were made so that the gods could see the stories from the sky. It was also used to let the gods know where their followers and worshippers lived. By seeing these depictions, the gods would never be angry with the Nazca people or strike them down.

Some scholars believe that the Nazca line named "The Astronaut" is a depiction of the god Kón, because he seems to have no bones or joints and his large eyes are a primary feature. The enormous drawing is thought to be an homage to him so that the rains would never cease to come. Other forms of worship included pottery and weavings to tell the story of the creation.

By 1483, both the Paracas and Nazca Civilizations had ceased to exist, and the Inca Empire ruled over parts of present-day Peru, Ecuador, Bolivia, Chile, and Argentina. The Incas did not praise the god Kón anymore, but a new god of creation, named Viracocha. The creation myth of the god Viracocha begins differently from that of Kón, but it has some borrowed elements incorporated into it. He was said to come from Lake Titicaca and created humans by breathing into stones. He is also associated with the rains of the region and is sometimes referred to as "Kon-Tiki", as a nod to the creation myth and the god Kón of the earlier civilizations. This is why Viracocha and Kón are confused at times, although they came from different civilizations.

== Other References to Kón ==
=== Kon-Tiki Expedition ===
This 1947 voyage was one led by Norwegian explorer Thor Heyerdahl from South America to the Polynesian Islands. The expedition was done so on a large raft, which was named Kon-Tiki in honor of the god Viracocha's "old name". It set sail from Trujillo, Peru. The Kon-Tiki expedition led to Heyerdahl writing a book titled "Kon-Tiki" followed by his documentary and more recently, a movie adaptation.

=== Astronomy ===
There is a crater named after the god Kon on Saturnian moon Rhea.

There is also a crater on dwarf planet Ceres named Coniraya.
