= Ayar Cachi =

According to Inca mythology, Ayar Cachi (in Hispanicized spelling) or Ayar Kachi (kachi means salt in Quechua) was one of the brothers of Manco Cápac, who emerged from the cave at Paqariq Tampu. He could shoot down hills with a single shot of his sling.

One legend tells that Ayar Cachi was very strong and was also very cruel to not only the natives they met along their journey to the Valley of Cuzco but also to his own people. The other Incas, Ayar Cachi’s brothers and sisters (Manco Capac, Ayar Auca, Ayar Uchu, Mama Ocllo, Mama Huaco, Mama Ipacura, and Mama Raua) all were afraid he would cause their people to desert them, so they made a plan to have him killed. Manco Capac told Ayar Cachi that they had left important objects back at the windows they had originated out of and asked him to go get them. The Incas sent Tampu-Chacay, who had been secretly ordered to kill Ayar Cachi, back to the windows with him. Ayar Cachi entered through the window called Ccapac-tocco in order to retrieve the items, but while he was in there, Tampu-Chacay sealed the opening with a rock, trapping Ayar Cachi inside to die. In retaliation Ayar Cachi turned Tampu-Chacay to stone, but was unable to escape the trap set for him by the other Incas.

== See also ==
- The legend of the Ayar brothers
