= Manco Cápac =

Legendary founder of the Inca civilization

Manqu Qhapaq
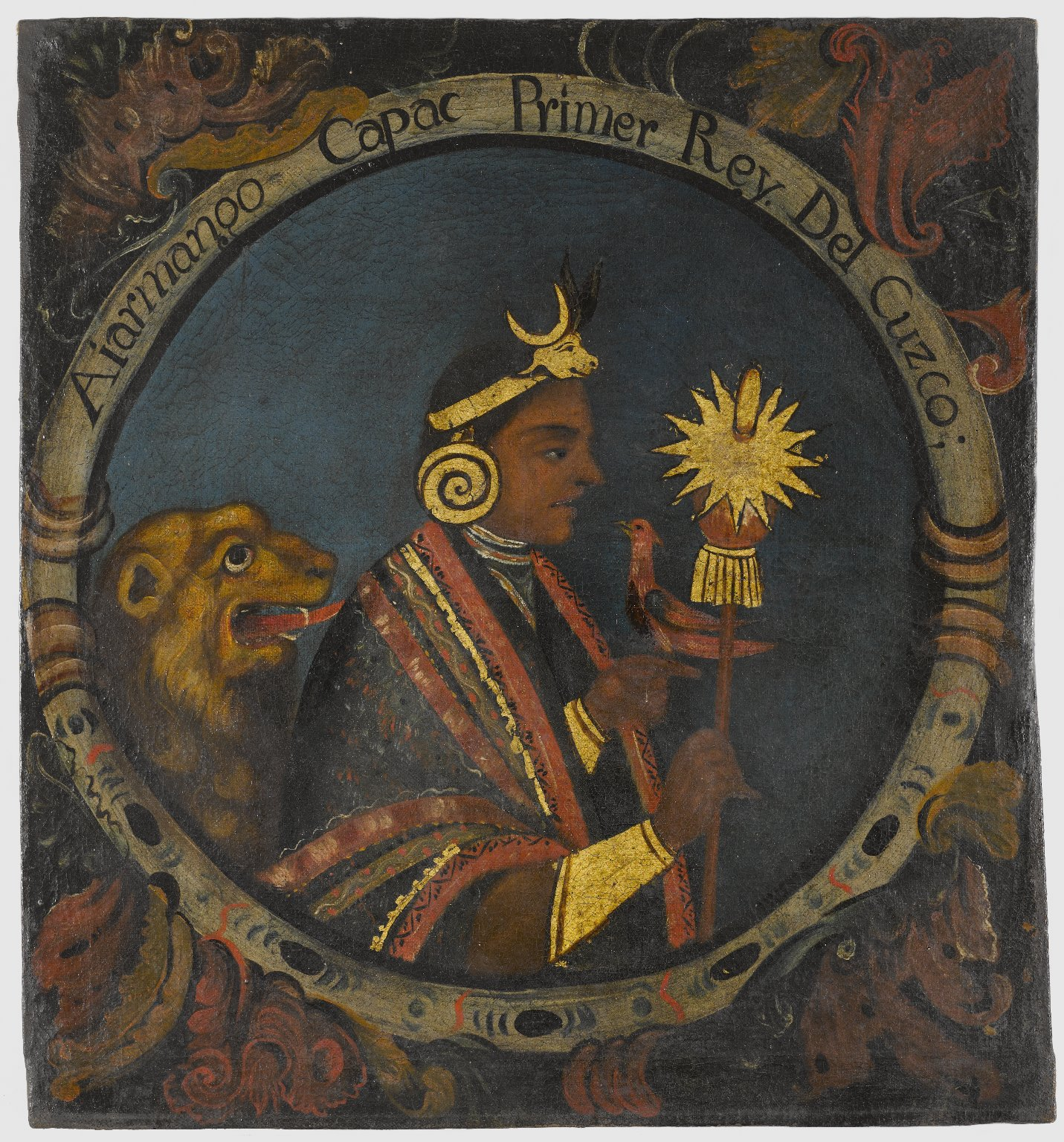
- Manco Cápac, mid–18th century painting, anonymous.

Legendary Sapa Inca of the Kingdom of Cusco
- Reign: c. 1200 – c. 1230
- Predecessor: Various in different versions, usually none (kingdom established); Mama Waqu Quya (Guaman Poma de Ayala)
- Successor: Sinchi Roca
- Born: before c. 1200; Tamputoco, Cusco, Inca Empire
- Died: c. 1230; Cusco, Inca Empire
- Spouse: Mama Uqllu or Mama Waqu
- Issue: Sinchi Roca
- Father: Apu Tambo, Inti or Viracocha
- Mother: Mama Killa or Mama Waqu

Manco Cápac (Quechua: Manqu Qhapaq, Cusco Quechua: [ˈmaɴqɔ ˈqʰapaχ]; born before c. 1200 – c. 1230) , also known as Manco Inca and Ayar Manco, was, according to some historians, the first governor and founder of the Inca civilisation in Cusco, possibly in the early 13th century. He is also a main figure of Inca mythology, being the protagonist of the two best known legends about the origin of the Inca, both of them connecting him to the foundation of Cusco. His main wife and the mother of his son and successor, Sinchi Ruq'a, was his sister Mama Uqllu. Even though his figure is mentioned in several chronicles, his actual existence remains uncertain.

== Biography ==
=== Origin ===
Manco Cápac was born in Tamputoco, which according to some is located in the present-day province of Paruro, in Peru. The city usually served as a refuge for many people escaping the Aymaran invasions of the Altiplano. His father was named Apu Tambo. Manco Cápac and his family lived a nomadic lifestyle. Manco Cápac's father Apu Tambo was the head of the local tribal ayllu, to which several dozens of families belonged to and were part of. The families were under his lead.

=== Foundation of Cusco ===
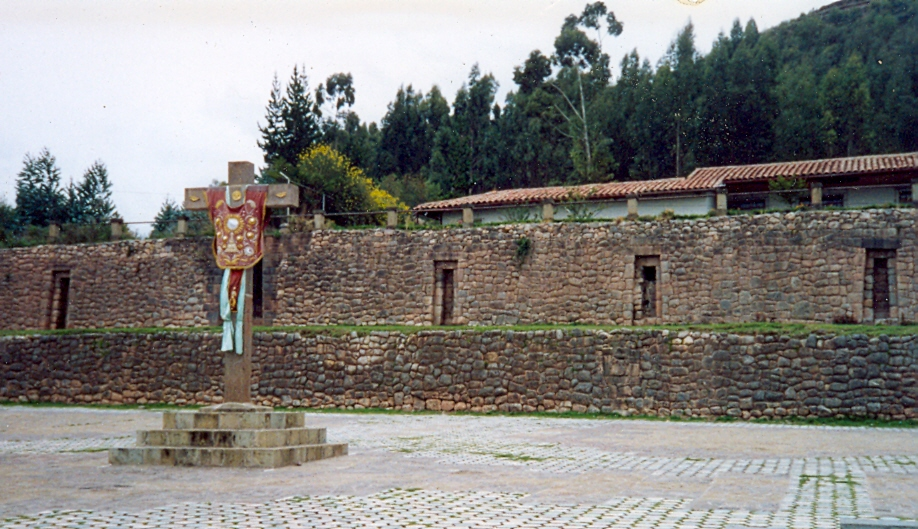
Walls of Colcampata, which served as Manco Capac's palace.

After the death of his father, Manco Capac had to succeed him as the head of the ayllu and now currently lead the several dozens of families. The members of the ayllu were nomads, and the trajectory of their journeys through the Altiplano resembles the journey described in the legend of the Ayar brothers. Upon arriving in the Cusco valley, they defeated three small tribes that lived there; the Sahuares, Huallas and Alcahuisas, and then settled in a swampy area between two small streams, that today corresponds with the main plaza of the city of Cusco. The recently founded city was divided into four districts; Chumbicancha, Quinticancha, Sairecancha and Yarambuycancha.

Manco Cápac's tribe, or ayllu, only occupied a small fraction of the Cusco valley, the rest of it being inhabited by larger and more powerful tribes, who often would threaten the city. Located north of the city there was a confederated lordship of Ayarmacas and Pinaguas. All these tribes regarded Manco Cápac and his ayllu as invaders and would often attack them. Manco Cápac, and later his son and successor Sinchi Roca, would often have to defend the city against the other tribes.

=== Death ===
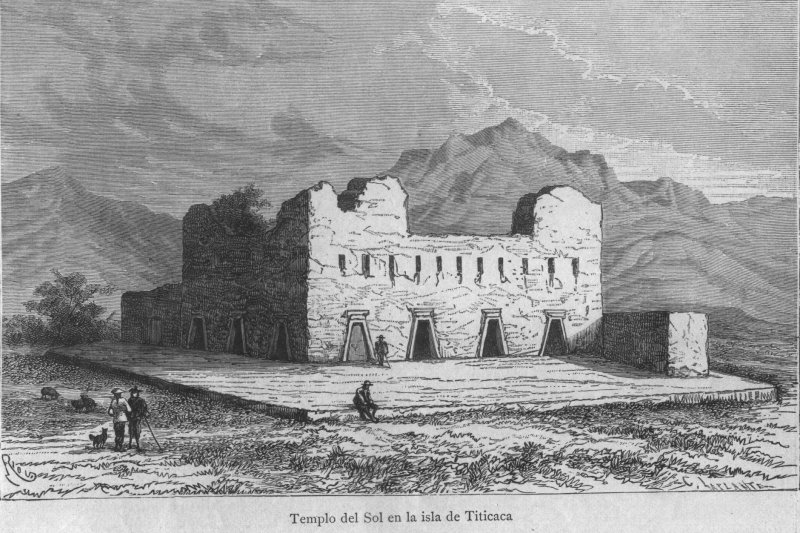
Temple on Isla del Sol (as seen in 1887) where the mummified body of Manco Cápac came to rest.

Manqu Qhapaq died of a natural death and left his son, Sinchi Roca, as his successor in Cusco. His body was mummified and remained in the city until the reign of Pachacuti, who ordered its removal to the Temple of the Sun on Isla del Sol. In Cusco there remained only a statue erected in his honor.

== Mythological origin ==
Manco Cápac is the protagonist of the two main legends that explain the origin of the Inca Empire. Both legends state that he was the founder of the city of Cusco and that his wife was Mama Uqllu.

=== Legend of the Ayar brothers ===
In this legend, Manco Cápac (Ayar Manco) was the son of Viracocha of Paqariq Tampu (six leagues or 25 km south of Cusco). He and his brothers (Ayar Auca, Ayar Cachi and Ayar Uchu) and sisters (Mama Ocllo, Mama Huaco, Mama Raua and Mama Ipacura) lived near Cusco at Paqariq Tampu, and they united their people with other tribes encountered in their travels. They sought to conquer the tribes of the Cusco Valley. This legend also incorporates the golden staff, thought to have been given to Manco Cápac by his father. Accounts vary, but according to some versions of the legend, the Manco got rid of his three brothers, trapping them or turning them into stone, thus becoming the leader of Cusco. He married his older sister, Mama Ocllo, and they begot a son named Sinchi Roca.

=== Legend of Manqu Qhapaq and Mama Ocllo ===
In this second legend, Manco Cápac was a son of the sun god Inti and the moon goddess Mama Killa, and brother of Pacha Kamaq. Manco Cápac himself was worshipped as a fire and a Sun God. According to the Inti legend, Manco Cápac and his siblings were sent up to the earth by the sun god and emerged from the cave of Pacaritambo carrying a golden staff, called tapac-yauri. Instructed to create a Temple of the Sun in the spot where the staff sank into the earth, they traveled to Cusco via caves and there built a temple in honour of their father Inti.

However, given the absence of a written tradition recounting this tale before the publication of Comentarios Reales de los Incas by Garcilaso de la Vega in the year 1609, the authenticity of this legend as a legitimate Incan legend is questioned.

=== Legend of Mama Waqu ===
Felipe Guaman Poma de Ayala mentions legend according to which Manco Capac was child of sorceress Mama Waqu who managed to enchant people of Cusco to make her their Queen regnant or "Quya". Mama Waqu afterwards had sexual relationships with multiple men and eventually gave birth to her son, Manco. The Queen ordered her servant to hide a child and then declared to her subjects that one day the new king, a son of the Sun and the Moon, will emerge from Paqariq Tampu. After two years, Manco Capac was smuggled out from it and recognized as Sapa Inca. Mama Waqu afterwards married her son and the two ruled jointly.

The myth is most likely an allegory of Incan king being child and worshipper of Earth, here identified with Mama Waqu. The Queen's polyandry in this tale is meant to represent Earth 'laying' with farmers.

== In fiction ==
The Son of the Sun (1987), the first Scrooge McDuck comic book story written and drawn by Don Rosa, features Manco Cápac as the original owner of various lost treasures.

In the first sentence of Herman Melville's novel The Confidence-Man (1857) the sudden appearance at sunrise on 1 April of a mysterious fictional character is compared to Cápac's appearance out of Lake Titicaca.

In P.B. Kerr's Eye of the Forest, the fifth book in the Children of the Lamp series, Manco Cápac is said to be a powerful Djinn who took his place as a god amongst the Incas by displaying his power of matter manipulation.

In British author Anthony Horowitz's fantasy-thriller book series The Power of Five, Manco Cápac is the son of Inti and one of five children destined to keep the universe safe from the forces of evil. Cápac is reincarnated in the 21st century as a Peruvian street beggar called Pedro.

Kuzco, the main character from The Emperor's New Groove, in the first version of the movie Kingdom of the Sun was supposed to be named Manco Cápac.

== Heritage ==
The car float Manco Capac operates across Lake Titicaca between PeruRail's railhead at Puno and the port of Guaqui in Bolivia.

== See also ==
- Kingdom of Cusco
- Inca Empire

== Bibliography ==
- Soriano, Waldemar Esponoza (1990). Los Incas - Economia, Sociedad Y Estado En La Era Del Tahuantinsuyo. Amaru Editores. ISBN 84-7090-300-4.
- Pugh, Helen; Intrepid Dudettes of the Inca Empire; (2020) ISBN 9781005592318

Regnal titles
Preceded by Inti Mayta Cápac Pachacuti (Pre-Incan king)	Sapa Inca c. 1200 – c. 1230	Succeeded by Sinchi Roca
