= Amaru (mythology) =

Serpent or dragon from Andean mythologies

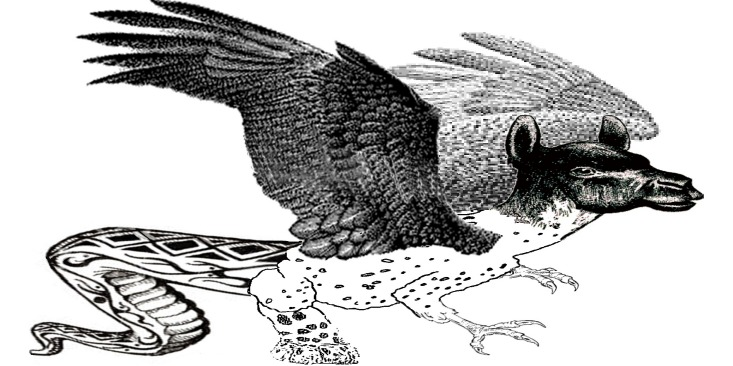
- A sketch of an Amaru

Creature information
- Other name(s): katari, the cosmic serpent
- Folklore: Inca mythology

Origin
- Region: the Andes
- Habitat: bottom of lakes and rivers

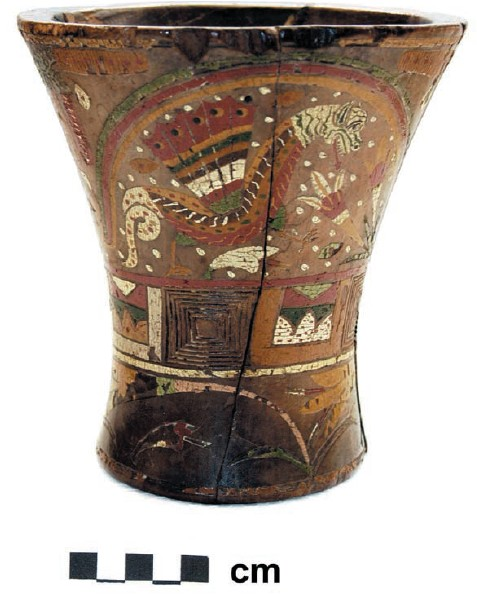
An amaru depicted on a Qiru.

In the mythology of the Andean civilizations of South America, the amaru or katari (Aymara) is a mythical serpent or dragon. In Inca mythology, Amaru is a huge double-headed serpent that dwells underground, at the bottom of lakes and rivers. It represents infinity, knowledge, and cosmic renewal, and connects the earthly world with the spiritual. It is an animal that traverses worlds and is capable of transcending boundaries to and from the spiritual realm of the underworld.

Amaru, also known as the cosmic serpent, is a deity deeply connected to the natural world and cosmic order in Andean cosmology. Its undulating form symbolizes the interconnection between earth and sky, embodying the dualistic forces of creation and destruction, life and death. Furthermore, it is said that all things, all beings, their lives, their realities, and their dreams are written on the scales of the Amaru.

== Appearance ==
Illustrated with the heads of a bird and a puma, Amaru can be seen emerging from a central element in the center of a stepped mountain or pyramid motif in the Gateway of the Sun at Tiwanaku in Bolivia. When illustrated on religious vessels, amaru is often seen with bird-like feet and wings, so that it resembles a dragon. Amaru is believed to be capable of transcending boundaries to and from the spiritual realm of the subterranean world.

According to Professor Brian S. Bauer, (Sacred serpent) was a serpent or dragon deity often depicted as a winged serpent, with crystalline eyes, a reddish snout, a llama head, taruka horns, and a fish tail; the details of its features vary from legend to legend, with its serpentine form remaining constant. Its symbolism is very broad: in addition to many associations with weather and the heavens (e.g. storms, hail, wisdom, rainbow, the Milky Way, etc.), it was also a symbol of wisdom. Its image was found in the Yachay Wasikuna (Houses of Knowledge). Amaru was also associated with the vital waters that irrigated the farmlands and upon which the Aymara people depended. In addition, Amaru was associated with the underworld, as well as the earth and earthquakes. Despite their usual benevolent portrayal, some Amarus display a violent side.

== Mythology ==
This legend of Huanca origin is part of a story within the folklore of the department of Junín. This story has been passed down orally from generation to generation, explaining the mythological origin of the two mountain ranges that shelter the Mantaro Valley.

The Huancas say that their ancestors lived in caves because terrible beasts lived around a large lake and attacked them.

The Huancas begged the god Wiracocha for help, who in turn ordered Tulumanya (the first rainbow) to send them help. With a roar, he brought forth from his chest a beast of colossal size: it had the head of a wanaku, the wings and claws of an eagle, the legs of an uturunku (jaguar) on a serpentine body covered with scales, ending in an anaconda's tail. This gigantic creature was known as Yana Amaru (dark in color).

This creature was sent to kill the beasts that prevented the inhabitants from going to the lake; however, everything got out of control. Yana Amaru now attacked the inhabitants and other creatures of the world for pleasure; in this way, Yana Amaru took over the lake.

The pleas of the Huancas once again reached the ears of the god Wiracocha, who then created another Amaru in the same way. This one had silver scales, unlike its brother created before it. The second Amaru was known as Yuraq Amaru (white snake).

The two Amarus fought each other, but this only caused greater destruction. The battle between the two serpents seemed endless and only brought profound destruction to the world instead of a definitive solution.

It was then that Wiracocha sent Illapa (Lightning) and Wayra (Wind) to fight them (in other variants of the myth, Wiracocha sends only Illapa to annihilate the mammoth serpents).

The two beasts tried to attack the gods. However, both beasts were unsuccessful in their endeavor. Finding themselves at a disadvantage, in a futile attempt, the two Amarus tried to flee to a lagoon, but Illapa destroyed the shore and Wayra caused the water to overflow, causing the lagoon to dry up. The two Amarus then tried to flee to the sky, but Wayra, with the power of the winds, dragged them back to earth, and Illapa fought the two creatures face to face, thus giving them the final battle.

Shortly before dying, both Amarus stretched and grew even larger, transforming into the two mountain ranges that wall the valley. The larger one to the west became a mountain range of fertile farmland and wide pastures, while the smaller one to the east became perpetually snow-capped.

That is why, when he sees a storm cloud approaching, the Amaru tries to reach it so he can scatter his hail upon the crops. Only at those moments is he vulnerable; it is then that he can be seen, in the form of an immense, sinuous serpent reaching for the sky. As soon as he catches sight of him, the farmer waves his hat to alert his savior heroes.

Then, lightning and wind rush in and, after a colossal battle, manage to defeat him and split him in two, confining him once more to the depths of the lake.

== See also ==
- List of dragons in mythology and folklore
- Religion in the Inca Empire
- Túpac Amaru
