= Urcuchillay =

Incan llama god who watches over animals

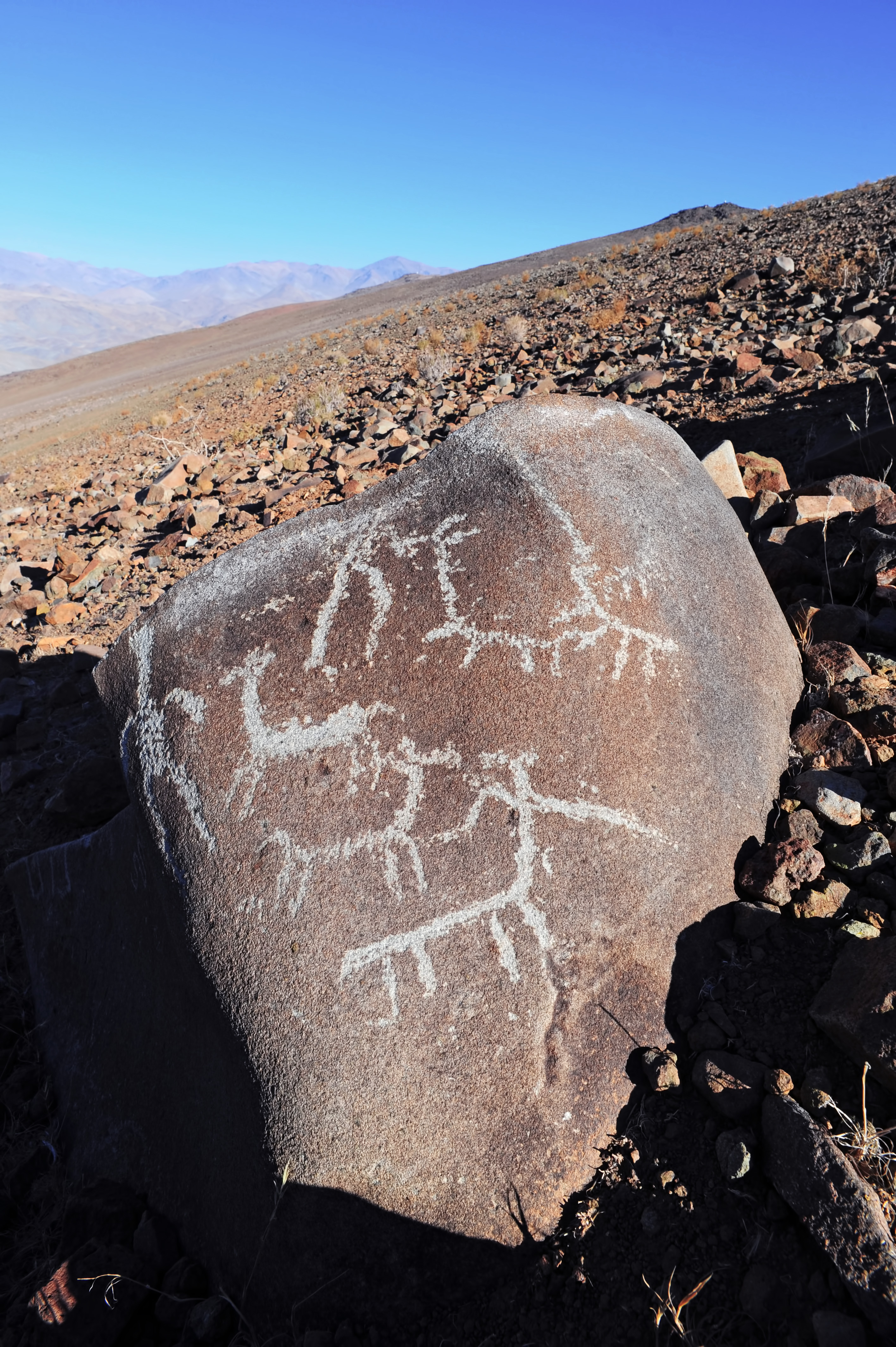
Inca petroglyphs depicting llamas near La Silla Observatory

Urcuchillay, sometimes spelled as Urcachillay, was a god worshiped by Incan herders, believed to be a multicolored male llama who watched over animals. It was said to be the incarnation of the constellation Lyra, as Urcuchillay was the name given to both the constellation and the deity. The IAU Working Group on Star Names adopted the name Urquchillay for the star Zeta^{2} Lyrae in this constellation in 2026.

== See also ==
- Inca mythology
- Yakana
