= Sinchi Roca =

Second Sapa Inca of the Kingdom of Cuzco

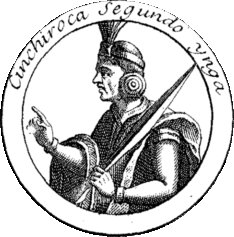
- Emperor Sinchi Roca

Sapa Inca of the Kingdom of Cusco
- Reign: c. 1230 – c. 1260
- Predecessor: Manco Cápac
- Successor: Lloque Yupanqui
- Born: c. 1230; Tampuquiro, Cusco, Inca Empire, modern-day Peru
- Died: c. 1260 (aged c. 30); Cusco, Inca Empire
- Spouse: Mama Cura (sister)
- Issue: Lloque Yupanqui
- Quechua: Sinchi Ruq'a
- Dynasty: Hurin
- Father: Manco Cápac
- Mother: Mama Ocllo

Sinchi Roca (c. 1230 – c. 1260), also known as Sinchi Rocca, Cinchi Roca (in Hispanicized spellings), Sinchi Ruq'a and Sinchi Ruq'a Inka (Quechua for "valorous generous Inca"), was the second Sapa Inca of the Kingdom of Cusco and a member of the Hurin dynasty (first dynasty).

== Family ==
Sinchi Roca is said to have been the son of two of the original Inca siblings, Manco Capac and Mama Ocllo; they may have conceived in Huaynacancha. He was Manco Capac's successor and continued his rule after his father's death.

He was the father of Lloque Yupanqui. His wife was Mama Cura of the Sanu lineage; she was the daughter of Sitic-huaman. They had a son named Sapaca. Manco Capac, Mama Huaco, Sinchi Rocca, and Manco Sapaca erected the House of the Sun.

== Reign ==
The Kingdom of Cuzco later became Tahuantinsuyu (the Inca empire) under the rule of Pachacuti. In one of the Inca foundation myths, Sinchi Roca led his family to the valley of Cuzco.

He is thought to have divided his land into territories and initiated the first census of the Inca population. He also ordered all the members of the Inca people to pierce their ears as a sign of nobility.

The 16th century Spanish writers, including Cabello de Balboa, (Note: As quoted by María Rostworowski) also affirm that Sinchi Roca would have been the first Inca to use Mascapaicha, or Maskaypacha (Quechua: transl. Mask'ay seek; Pacha land, world, or space-time), which would become a sign of Inca sovereignty. Among the Incas, the imperial crown was composed of several elements: the mascapaicha, considered to be the most important, was a fringe of red wool, ordered on the forehead because each of its strands "passed through a small tube of gold". Above this fringe were two or three black and white feathers of the Korekenke, also known as an Andean mountain caracara, which was considered to be sacred. This fringe and feathers were secured on the forehead by a turban or headband known as the llautu or llauto, consisting of a multicoloured braid "of extremely fine vicuña wool" wrapped several times around the head. The mascapaicha was the mark of absolute imperial power, to the point that "to take" or "to gird the mascapaicha" or "to claim the scarlet fringe" was used to signify the coming of the new emperor, or Sapa Inca, during a ceremony where he received it from the hands of the Willaq Umu, the high priest or pontiff of the Inca religion.

According to legend, during the reign of Sinchi Roca, a llamamichi (transl. llama shepherd) entered his house and took a young woman whom he loved. The Inca then had him captured and tortured him until he provided a reason for committing the crime; the young woman, not wanting to see the villager tortured anymore, revealed that she had fallen in love with the llamamichi as soon as he saw him wearing a wacanqui (amulet of love) and the shepherd confessed that he had received such an object from a demon in a cave.

=== Building program ===
The chronicler Pedro Cieza de León states that Sinchi Roca built terraces and imported large quantities of soil in order to improve the fertility of the valley.

Sinchi came to be used as the title for a warlord, while Cápac, one of his father's names, became the title for a sovereign.

== Notes ==
Regnal titles
Preceded by Manco Cápac	Sapa Inca c. 1230 – c. 1260	Succeeded by Lloque Yupanqui
