= Mama Qucha =

Ancient Incan goddess

Mama Qucha or Mama Cocha (Quechua: mama qucha lit. "Mother Sea", "Mother Lake", or just "sea") is the ancient Incan goddess of sea and fishes, guardian of sailors and fishermen, wife of Wiraqucha, mother of Inti and Mama Killa. She was commonly worshipped to calm rough waters and to obtain good fishing, and was considered one of the four Elemental Mothers (the others being Pachamama, Mama Nina, and Mama Wayra). The word mama in Mama Qucha comes from the Quechua language, where it means "mother"; this usage predates Spanish contact and appears widely in names of Andean deities such as Pachamama and Mama Quilla. Along with Mama Quilla (the Moon) and Pachamama, she constituted the Incan lunar trinity. In some regions of empire people believed she was the goddess of all bodies of water, including lakes, rivers, and even human-made water sources. Mama Qucha was more important to people living beside the coastal regions due to nearness and dependence upon the sea. Inca beliefs in Mama Qucha and other water deities indicate that the people back then understood the basics of the hydrological cycle. They knew the seawater was replenishing the rain, which then fell over the ground.

Wife of the supreme god Wiraqucha and mother of Inti and Mama Quilla, Mama Qucha was also the deity that represented all that was feminine and, in the same way, gave balance to the known world. She was often identified with the very rainwater that falls to fertilize the earth.

Another important point is that Mama Qucha inhabited the "world above", that is, the Hanan Pacha. In the Inca empire, the universe was conceived to be composed of three aspects or planes complementary to each other: Uku pacha (world below), Kay pacha (world of the present) and Hanan pacha (world above). Mama Qucha inhabited the last one together with the righteous people and other Inca gods such as: Wiraqucha, Inti and Mama Quilla, among others.

An ancient Inca legend tells that Mama Qucha was the daughter of the Sun and the Moon. She was also sister of "Inca" (the Son of the Sun) and physically she was described as a pale and beautiful young woman, sent from heaven with her brother to teach people to live and work in peace and love. The people, upon meeting her, recognized her as their protective mother and under her and Inca's guidance they made houses and roads, temples and fortresses. Thus they tilled the earth, which soon bore fruit.
