= Inca mythology =

Myths of the Inca civilization

Inca mythology of the Inca Empire was based on pre-Inca beliefs that can be found in the Huarochirí Manuscript, and in pre-Inca cultures including Chavín, Paracas, Moche, and the Nazca culture. The mythology informed and supported Inca religion.

One of the most important figures in pre-Inca Andean beliefs was the creator deity Viracocha. During Inca times, Viracocha remained significant - he was seen as the creator of all things, or the substance from which all things are created, and intimately associated with the sea. According to legend, the founder of the Inca Dynasty in Peru and the Cusco Dynasty at Cusco was Manco Cápac. His history is unclear, especially concerning his rule at Cuzco and his origins. In one story, he was the son of Viracocha. In another, he was raised from the depths of Lake Titicaca by the sun god Inti. Commoners were not allowed to speak the name of Viracocha, which is possibly an explanation for the need for three foundation legends rather than just one.

Inca society was influenced by the local animal populations; both as food, textile, and transport sources, as well as religious and cultural cornerstones. Many myths and legends of the Inca include or are solely about an animal or a mix of animals and their interactions with the gods, humans, and or natural surroundings. Animals were also important in Incan astronomy, with the Milky Way symbolized as a river, with the stars within it being symbolized as animals that the Inca were familiar with in and around this river.

== Pre-Inca Andean beliefs ==
Pre-Inca beliefs can be found in the Huarochirí Manuscript, a 17th-century text that records the myths, culture, and beliefs of people in the Huarochirí Province of the Western Andes. Other pre-Inca cultures include Chavín, Paracas, Moche, and the Nazca culture.

One of the most important figures in pre-Inca Andean beliefs is the creator deity Viracocha, who even during Inca times was one of the most important deities in the Inca pantheon and seen as the creator of all things, or the substance from which all things are created, and intimately associated with the sea. In pre-Incan Andean iconography Viracocha takes the form of a Staff God, characterized by front-facing figures holding vertical objects which are referred to as "staffs". As the chief deity, Viracocha was the creator god and served as the primary religious icon of the entire Peruvian Andes, particularly during the Early Horizon (900-200 BC) onwards.

== Basic beliefs ==
Scholarly research demonstrates that Runa (Quechua speakers) belief systems were integrated with their view of the cosmos, especially in regard to the way that the Runa observed the motions of the Milky Way and the Solar System as seen from Cusco, the capital of Tawantinsuyu whose name means "The four regions together". From this perspective, their stories depict the movements of constellations, planets, and planetary formations, which are all connected to their agricultural cycles. This was especially important for the Runa, as they relied on cyclical agricultural seasons, which were not only connected to annual cycles, but to a much wider cycle of time (every 800 years at a time). This way of keeping time was deployed in order to ensure the cultural transmission of key information, in spite of regime change or social catastrophes.

After the Spanish conquest of Peru by Francisco Pizarro, colonial officials burned the records kept by the Runa. There is currently a theory put forward by Gary Urton that the quipus could have been a binary system capable of recording phonological or logographic data. Still, to date, all that is known is based on what was recorded by priests, from the iconography on Inca pottery and architecture, and from the myths and legends that have survived among the indigenous peoples of the Andes.

== Worldview ==
The Andean people (and the Incas) had a dualistic view of the cosmos. They believed that the universe was made up of several worlds, each with its counterpart:

- Hawa Pacha: the outside world (what exists but cannot be perceived by our senses).
- Hanan Pacha: the world above, celestial and supraterrestrial (gods such as the sun, moon, lightning, stars, rainbow, etc.).
- Hakaq Pacha or Haqay Pacha: (the world beyond or of spirits).
- Kay Pacha: the world of here and now (humans, animals, plants, etc.).
- Hurin Pacha: the world below, the underworld (the dead, the unborn, and disease).
- Uku Pacha: the world within (the world of eternal darkness).

It is believed that the Spanish colonizers simplified this worldview to three levels to fit Christian symbolism.

== Inca foundation legends ==
Manco Cápac was the legendary founder of the Inca Dynasty in Peru and the Cusco Dynasty at Cusco. The legends and history surrounding him are very contradictory, especially those concerning his rule at Cuzco and his origins. In one legend, he was the son of Viracocha. In another, he was brought up from the depths of Lake Titicaca by the sun god Inti. However, commoners were not allowed to speak the name of Viracocha, which is possibly an explanation for the need for three foundation legends rather than just one.

There were also many myths about Manco Cápac and his coming to power. In one myth, Manco Cápac and his brother Pacha Kamaq were sons of the sun god Inti. Manco Cápac was worshiped as the fire and sun god. In another myth, Manco Cápac was sent with Mama Ocllo (others even mention numerous siblings) to Lake Titicaca where they resurfaced and settled on the Isla Del Sol. According to this legend, Manco Cápac and his siblings were sent up to the earth by the sun god and emerged from the cave of Puma Orco at Paqariq Tampu carrying a golden staff called "tapac-yauri". They were instructed to create a Temple of the Sun in the spot where the staff sank into the earth to honor the sun god Inti, their father. During the journey, one of Manco's brothers (Ayar Cachi) was tricked into returning to Puma Urqu and sealed inside or alternatively was turned to ice, because his reckless and cruel behavior angered the tribes that they were attempting to rule. (huaca).

Pedro Sarmiento de Gamboa wrote that there was a hill referred to as Tambotoco, about 33 kilometers from Cuzco, where eight men and women emerged as the original Inca's. The men were Manco Capac, Ayar Auca, Ayar Cachi, and Ayar Uchu. The women were Mama Ocllo, Mama Huaco, Mama Ipacura, and Mama Raua.

In another version of this legend, instead of emerging from a cave in Cuzco, the siblings emerged from the waters of Lake Titicaca. Since this was a later origin myth than that of Pacaritambo it may have been created as a ploy to bring the powerful Aymara tribes into the fold of the Tawantinsuyo.

In the Inca Virachocha legend, Manco Cápac was the son of Inca Viracocha of Paqariq Tampu which is 25 km (16 mi) south of Cuzco. He and his brothers (Ayar Auca, Ayar Cachi, and Ayar Uchu); and sisters (Mama Ocllo, Mama Huaco, Mama Raua, and Mama Cura) lived near Cusco at Paqariq Tampu, and uniting their people and the ten ayllu they encountered in their travels to conquer the tribes of the Cusco Valley. This legend also incorporates the golden staff, which is thought to have been given to Manco Cápac by his father. Accounts vary, but according to some versions of the legend, the young Manco jealously betrayed his older brothers, killed them, and then became Cusco.

== Deities ==
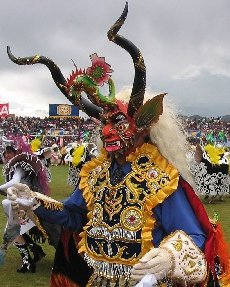
Supay, god of death, as interpreted in a carnival festival

The Incas permitted the cultures they integrated into their empire to keep their individual religions. Some of the various gods worshiped by the peoples of the Incan empire had overlapping responsibilities and domains. These were worshipped by different ayllus or worshipped in particular former states.

- Apu (transl. Lord) are tutelary mountain spirits that can be either benevolent or malicious, depending on if they are properly venerated.
- Amaru (Sacred serpent) was a serpentine, chimerical or draconic deity associated with wisdom, water, earth, and the underworld. It represented both destructive and benevolent aspects of nature, associated with both earthquakes and the irrigating rivers upon which the Aymara people depended for their harvest.
- Ataguchu (a.k.a. Atagujo, Ataguju) was a god who assisted in creation myth. The legend says Ataguchu, tired due to the Cosmos loneliness, created some divine beings to be his servants. At the same time, he created Guamansuri and sent him to earth (more precisely, the Huamanchuco province). The province was inhabited by an ethnic group called Guachemines. Guamansuri, as a foreigner, was at service of the group. Guachemines leaders had a sister called Cautaguan, due to her beautifulness, she was confined. However, one day Guamansuri seduced and got Cautaguan pregnant. When the leaders realized their sister was pregnant, they instantly knew Guamansuri was the culprit, so they captured and burned Guamansuri and scattered his ashes. Guamansuri's ashes went up to the sky and stayed there with Ataguchu. The leaders put Cautaguan under strict surveillance and, in a few days, she gave birth to two eggs, and died in childbirth. They took the eggs and put them in a dunghill where two screaming children came out of them. A servant took care of the children, who were named Catequil and Piguerao (in one version, it is stated that Piguerao was born with a weak condition and hence he died shortly after. In another version, he supports his brother in order to defeat the Guachemines). Catequil went to where his mother had died and brought her back to life. She gave him the slings that Guamansuri had left for him, so that he could kill the Guachemines. Catequil killed many Guachemines and expelled from the country those he did not kill. So he went to heaven and informed Ataguchu that the land was already free of the Guachemines and asked him to create the people to inhabit and work it. Ataguchu told him to go to the hill and to the high pasture lands called Guacat, upstream from the actual city of La Parilla de Santa. Once there, both brothers pulled the Indians out of the land using gold and silver tools.
- Auquis were deities that watched over each populated region.
- Axomamma (Mother of potatoes) was a goddess of potatoes.
- Catequil (A.k.a. Apocatequil, Apu Catequil) was the tutelar god of day and good, and the god of thunder and lightning in the northern Peruvian highlands. Catequil and his twin brother Piguerao were born from hatched eggs. It was also believed that Catequil was another name or representation of god Illapa.
- Cavillace was a virgin goddess who ate a fruit, which was actually the sperm of Coniraya, the moon god and mother of the Coya, who raised the ñusta of the empire. When she gave birth to a son, she demanded that the father step forward. No one did, so she put the baby on the ground and it crawled towards Coniraya. She was ashamed because of Coniraya's low stature among the gods, and ran to the coast of Peru, where she changed herself and her son into rocks.
- Ch'aska (Morning star; a.k.a. Ch'aska Quyllur or Chasca) was the goddess of dawn, the twilight and dusk, as well as the goddess of beauty, virgin women and the flowers. She was considered as the "Venus star" due to her similarities shared with the Roman goddess Venus as well as her luminosity equated to the homologous planet, which is, after the Sun and the Moon, the brightest celestial object in the night sky.
- Chaupiñamca is a divinity considered the feminine counterpart of the god Paryaqaqa. Like the latter, Chaupiñamca had five sisters, she being the eldest of all. She's represented as a rigid stone with five wings.
- Chuychu (Rainbow; a.k.a. K'uychi) is the beautiful rainbow that was below both great gods (Punchaw and Ch'aska) and that was later elevated to the god of the nobles because it represented the beauty that was reserved for the nobles.
- Coniraya was the moon deity who fashioned his sperm into a fruit, which Cavillaca then ate.
- Conopa is a small, particularly shaped object worshiped at the domestic level in communities in the Andes of Peru.
- Copacati was a lake goddess.
- Coquena, sometimes called Pachamama's husband, is the protector deity of llama, vicuña, and other camelids among the Diaguita-Calchaquí. (cf. Yastay)
- Ekeko was a god of the hearth and wealth. The ancients made dolls that represented him and placed a miniature version of their desires onto the doll; this was believed to cause the user to receive what they desired.
- Huallallo Carhuincho (Yellowish mountain range; a.k.a. Huallallo Carhuancho, Wallallo Karwinchu) was the god of fire and the main god of the wankas, depicted as a human with dog traits, with an evil profile and a devourer of children. Exiled to the jungles by Viracocha, he lives in solitude eating animals, although he also feeds on human flesh. One day, he met a boy and planned to eat him. Then the boy revealed himself as Inti, the Sun god. Huallallo Carhuincho was then punished by Viracocha and sent to an island, tied hand and foot, and at the mercy of birds and other animals that bite him for eternity.
- Huamancantac (A.k.a. Guamancantac) was the god of guano. Due to this, he's also known as the "Lord of guano". He's represented as an idol and was associated with guano birds. Coastal people made a lot of offerings to him with the purpose of extracting some of guano for agricultural and fishing issues.
- Huari (A.k.a. Guari) was the main god of Chavín culture. To them, Huari was the god of war and was also associated with water, the rain, the lightning and agriculture. Huari can turn into a puma or the proper lightning. It's believed that he had the main center of it in the alley of Conchucos, the same place where Chavín de Huántar was erected. The Huari ethnic and possibly also the Wari culture would continue the worship of this god under the same name, but with proper characteristics. To them, Huari was the giant god of war and was associated with the sun, the water and agriculture. In addition to his giant aspect, Huari also can turn into a man, a snake and wind. Later, the Incas would adopt him into their pantheon as well.
- Huaytapallana (Place where flowers are collected) was a god that had an important role during dry seasons. In other legends, Huaytapallana was a woman with a captivating beauty. She was the daughter of the god Huallallo Carhuincho. Huaytapallana fell in love with Amaru, the son of Paryaqaqa. Paryaqaqa and Huallallo had a mutual enmity even before this event, enmity that led to Huallallo killing Amaru. Paryaqaqa saddened by the loss of his son, sent a powerful flood that drowned Huaytapallana. After that, both gods had a fierce battle that destroyed everything in their path. Paryaqaqa won the battle. Angered, Huallallo turned into a devourer of humans, blaming them for his disgrace. Viracocha saw these atrocities, and punished Paryaqaqa and Huallallo for their cruelties by turning both gods into snowy mountains.
- Hurkaway was a guardian snake that lurks around in Uku Pacha. It's believed that this creature is actually Urcaguary, the Inca deity of jewels and metals.
- Illapa (Thunder and lightning; a.k.a. Apu Illapa, Ilyap'a, Chuquiylla, Catuilla, Intillapa, Libiac) was the god of thunder, lightning, rain, and war. In a general way, Illapa was the lord of the weather. Despite the fact that the main faculty of the deity was lightning and its other elements, Illapa had the absolute control of weather. Due to his faculty as weather god, Illapa was highly revered, especially in times of pilgrimage and drought. Illapa, as the god of war, played an essential role in war contexts. Illapa was the protective numen of the Inca military campaigns. These were quite frequent during the expansion of the Tahuantinsuyo. As a result of his aforementioned powers, Illapa was considered the third most important god within the Inca pantheon, only surpassed by Wiracocha and Inti. He is represented as an imposing man in brilliant garments of gold and precious stones who lived in the upper world. Likewise, Illapa carried a warak'a with which he produced storms and a golden makana, which symbolizes his power and the trinity of lightning bolt, thunder and lightning. According to the chronicler Bernabé Cobo, another representation that the Incas gave to Illapa was that of a warrior formed by stars in the celestial world. His rites took place in the highest mountains, because they believed that Illapa lived in them. His rites consisted of dances, chants, festivals and animal sacrifices (in periods of great need, human offerings were also made). Illapa manifested himself in the earthly world in the form of a puma or hawk. There is a legend that said that Illapa kept water that he drew from the Milky Way in an urpu and gave it to his sister, Mama Quilla, to take care of her. When said urpu was filled, Illapa would throw a projectile from his huaraca to the urpu producing a roar that would cause thunder, the lightning would come to be the sparks produced by the impact and finally the water would come out as rain. It is said that the Incas, to attract the attention of the god so that he would produce rain, tied up black dogs and left them without food or drink. A time would pass in which these animals would begin to sob in pain from hunger and thirst. This made the god Illapa take pity on them and send rain to prevent their deaths. It is also mentioned that if the dogs were to die, this deity demonstrated his wrath by sending a powerful lightning bolt that would strike down without leaving a trace of those responsible for the death of said animals. Illapa took place in the Coricancha as well as the god Inti and other additional gods. The church of San Blas (Cuzco) was built on a temple where this god was worshiped. It is believed that Sacsayhuamán would have been used both as a military fortress and as a ceremonial temple, dedicated to various divinities, among which Illapa stood out. According to the chronicler Cristóbal de Molina, Illapa had its own temple, which was known as Pucamarca.
- Inti (Sun; a.k.a. Apu Inti, Apu Punchaw, Punchaw) was the sun god. He was a source of warmth and light and a protector of the people. Inti was considered the most important god. The Inca Emperors were believed to be the lineal descendants of the sun god.
- Ka-ata-killa was a pre-inca moon goddess that was worshiped near Lake Titicaca.
- Kolash (Human from the nest) was the god of birds and their trills. Kolash was born as a bird and later became a human, similar to god Paryaqaqa. Kolash represents the absolute whole; that is, he is the explanation for the being of all things. His body is massive, with broad arms that support the entire universe. Another characteristic of Kolash is his thick, trapezoidal back. Furthermore, Kolash is said to have a large nose, whose size is a symbol of virility and is also attributed with healing properties.
- Kon (A.k.a. Wakon) was the god of rain and wind that came from the south. He was a son of Inti and Mama Killa. Kon was known as "the boneless god" because he was light since he lacked bones and meat. Despite this, he had a human form. Kon was also represented as a being with a felinic face, although it's believed that he wore feline masks. Due to these characteristics, this god is known as "the flying feline." He carried trophy heads and a staff. In some huacos he's also depicted as a man with bird traits or a feline with prominent eyes, and due to his prominent eyes, he is also known as "the eyed god." Kon can also transform into a sandstorm to move across the vast Peruvian coastal deserts. Kon created the first generation of humans, until his defeat and exile by Pachakamaq.
- Mallko was known as the first son of the sun god (Wiracocha or Inti) in Vichama's myth. This established Mallko as the brother of Vichama and half-brother of Pachakamaq and Kon. When Pachacámac tore his body to pieces to create food, from the remains of Mallko's navel and umbilical cord, the sun god created another new child. This new child would be known as Vichama. In other representations, Mallko was the Inca god of law.
- Mallku (Spirits of the mountains) was a deity that represents the spirit and strength of the mountains. It takes the form of a powerful Condor.
- Mama Allpa (Mother Earth) was a fertility goddess depicted with multiple breasts.
- Mama Koka (Mother of coca leaves) was the goddess of health and happiness in Inca mythology. She was originally a promiscuous woman who was torn in half by several jealous lovers. After her death, one of her parts would originate the coca plant, widely consumed by the Andean people, according to their mentality, these plants gave health and happiness.
- Mama Nina (Mother of fire) was the goddess of light, the fire and volcanoes.
- Mama Quinoa (Mother of quinoa grain; a.k.a. Quinoa mama, Quinua mama) was the goddess of quinoa grain. Incas worshiped her fervently at the beginning of each planting season. The quinoa grain, or quinoa, was one of their main crops, and for 6,000 years it has been the staple food of the inhabitants of the Andes.
- Mama Qucha (Sea mother; a.k.a. Mama Qocha, Mama Cocha) was the sea and fish goddess, protector of sailors and fishermen. In one legend she mothered Inti and Mama Killa with Wiraqucha. Mama Qucha is considered one of the four elemental mothers, including Mama Nina (Mother of Fire), Pachamama (Mother Earth) and Mama Wayra (Mother of the Winds). Having as a curious fact that she, together with Pachamama and Mama Killa, form the three phases of the Moon.

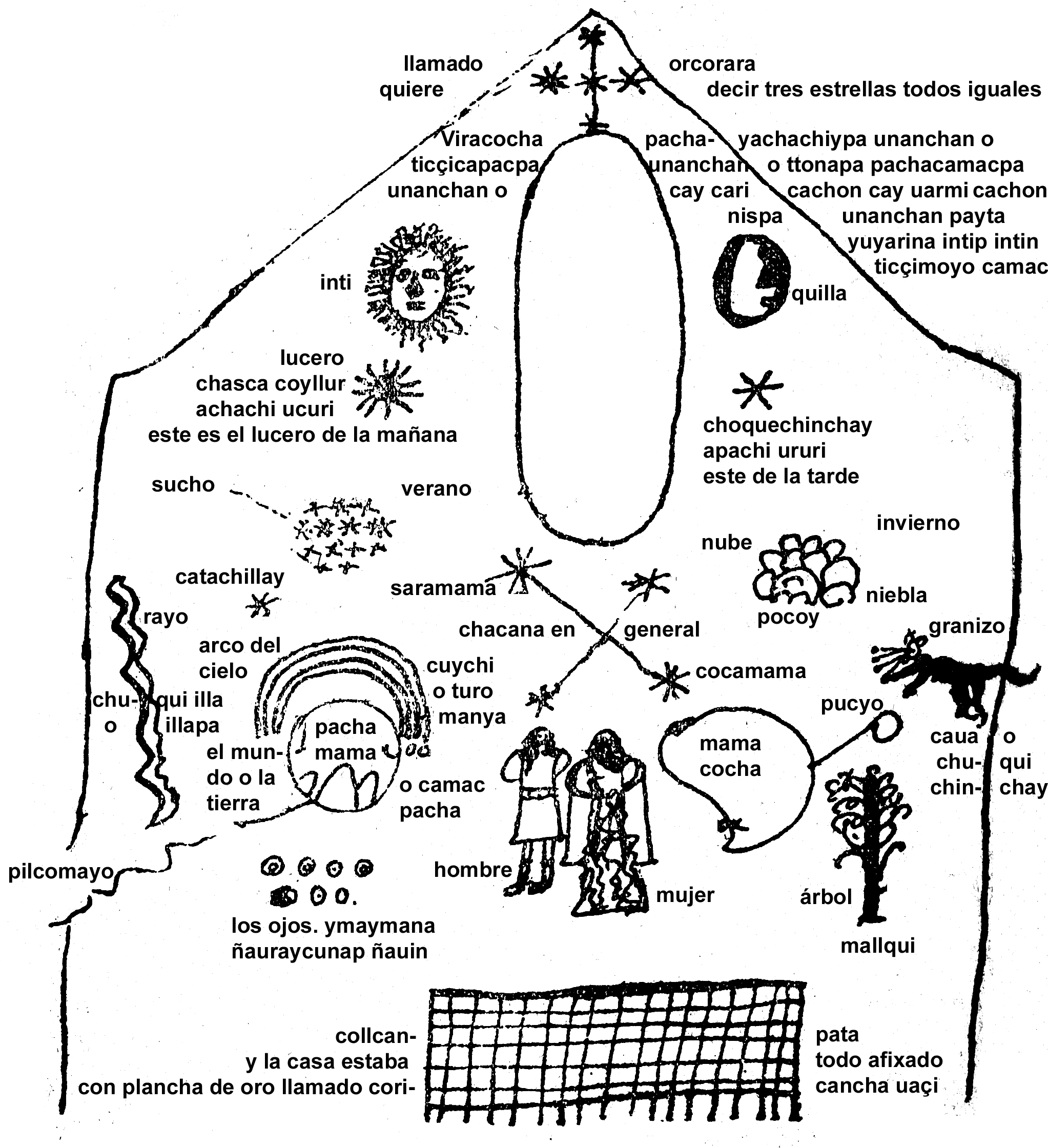
Representation of the cosmology of the Incas, according to Juan de Santa Cruz Pachacuti Yamqui Salcamayhua (1613), after a picture in the Sun Temple Qurikancha in Cusco, with Inti (the Sun), Mama Killa (the Moon), Illapa (the Lightning), Pachamama (Mother Earth), Mama Qucha (Mother Sea), and Chakana (Southern Cross) with Saramama (Mother Corn) and Kukamama (Mother Coca).

- Mama Pacha (Mother nature or Mother Earth; a.k.a. Pachamama) was considered a sacred being by the andean cosmovision. She was the mother of the hills and men since she not only cared for the material but also for the spiritual. Protector of nature, provider of water and food, favoring the fertility of the earth and sheltering human beings in exchange for help and protection, the Incas had the greatest veneration towards her. Her cult was important because the success of the empire's harvests depended on it. Although she is considered a kind spirit, she can also be hostile to those who do not respect nature; she shows her anger through droughts, earthquakes, or making the weather unsuitable for the growth of food. She was the wife of Pachakamaq, who was considered the god of the sky and the clouds, although in other legends, Pachakamaq was the god of fire or earthquakes. The union of the Pachamama with Pachakamaq would come to represent the union of the earth and sky, from this union, Inti and Mama Killa would be born and both were known as "The Willkas," which means "the sacred ones." She is represented as an adult woman who carries potatoes and coca leaves. Other representations show her as a dragon and she is symbolized with a spiral.
- Mama Rayhuana was the goddess of flora and fauna, a source of energy and fertility, under whose protection were vast cultivated territories of potatoes, corn, ollucos, mashua and quinoa.
- Mama Killa (Mother moon) was a marriage, festival and moon goddess and daughter of Wiraqucha and Mama Qucha, as well as wife and sister of Inti. In one legend, she was the mother of Manqu Qhapaq, Pacha Kamaq, Kon and Mama Uqllu.
- Mama Sara (Maize mother; a.k.a. Saramama, Zaramama) was the goddess of grain. She was associated with maize that grew in multiples or were similarly strange. These strange plants were sometimes dressed as dolls of Mama Sara. She was also associated with willow trees. She had several subjects:
  - Kuka Manka (Coca cup constellations) was a constellation that took care of magical herbs.
  - Sara Manka (Corn cup constellation) was a constellation that took care of plant foods.
- Mama Wayra (Mother of wind) was the goddess of air and winds, protectress of the birds. She was considered as a purifying goddess.
- Manañamca was a malevolent femenine deity, partner of the god Huallallo Carhuincho. Like the latter, she faced the god Paryaqaqa but he defeated her and threw her into the sea.
- Pacha Kamaq (The Soul of Earth, The Earth maker, The Earth shaker; a.k.a. Pachacámac, Pachakamaq) was a chthonic creator god, reissue of god Viracocha and also a god associated with the fire, the sky, the clouds and the earthquakes. It's said the ancient Peruvians thought that a single movement of his head would cause massive cataclysms, and if he'd move completely, the world would come to its end, since Pachakamaq was a god associated with being able to predict the future and control the movements of the earth. Due to this, Pachakamaq is also known as the "god of the earthquakes." Far from being the one who protects people from telluric movements, he was the one who provoked them and who had to be pleased and offered so that he would not send said scourge. Pachakamaq was represented on a long wooden idol. The bottom part of the idol shows zoomorphic, ornitomorphic and anthropomorphic designs along with crops, plants, and atmospheric phenomena. It's believed that part represents the earth's creation by Pachakamaq. The upper part of the idol shows Pachakamaq with two faces of aggressive expression, representing a symbol of the duality of pre-hispanic andean thought. He was considered as the creator god of the second generation of humans, after a fierce and long battle between Pachakamaq and the god Kon, a battle in which Kon would end up being defeated and banished by the victorious Pachakamaq. Pachakamaq was worshiped earlier by the Ichma and was highly respected, because no one could look him directly in the eye. Even his priests entered backwards to see him. Due to his powerful influence, the Incas adopted him into their pantheon as part of the Inca creation myth. Only high dignitaries entered the great temples, but ordinary pilgrims could observe and make their own sacrifices in the plazas.
- Paryaqaqa (Stone falcon) was the god of water in pre-inca mythology, coming from an ethnic group called Yauyos and later adopted by the Huanca culture when the Huancas were defeated by the Yauyos. When the Incas defeated both ethnic groups, Paryaqaqa was later adopted by them into their pantheon as well. He was a storm god and considered as a creator god. He was born as a falcon like his five brothers in Condorcoto mountain, to later become a Kolash (human from the nest). One legend says this god left his divine life in the sky when he saw a humble man crying. Paryaqaqa, dismayed, asked him why he was crying. The man told the god that Huallallo Carhuincho threatened the man's people that if they didn't give him enough human sacrifices, Huallallo Carhuincho would burn the whole village. Paryaqaqa decided to fight Huallallo Carhuincho. When the battle was over, Paryaqaqa was victorious, and the village was free from the tyranny of Huallallo. The people of the village worshiped Paryaqaqa fervently as a sign of gratefulness. It's believed Paryaqaqa, along with Catequil, were different representations of god Illapa due to the three gods share strong similarities like the absolute control of weather and they present warrior and dominant facets in their respective legends.
- Paricia was a god who sent a flood to kill humans who did not respect him adequately. Possibly another name for Paryaqaqa.
- Piguerao (A.k.a. Pikiru) was the tutelar god of night and evil.
- Paqtawañuy (Beware of death) It was a deity personifying death. In Cusco, there was a sanctuary dedicated to this deity. Sacrifices were made to it to avoid or be freed from sudden death.
- Puñuy (A.k.a. Puñui) was a divinity associated with dreams and the act of sleeping. Puñuy was venerated at the second huaca of the fourth ceque (known as "Payao") in the Chinchaysuyu region of the Inca Empire. Ritual sacrifices were performed at this site to invoke protection for those suffering from insomnia and to ensure that people would not die in their sleep. The word puñuy in Quechua means "to sleep", and this term contributed to the historical name of the modern city of Puno, Peru, which was once called Puñuy Pampa, meaning "place of rest."
- Qhaxra-kamayuq (The one who takes care of sowing) was a guardian deity who made an effort to prevent thieves from entering houses.
- Qhoa (A.k.a. Qoa, Coa, Ccoa, K'oa, Khoa, Cahua, Caua, Qowa, Quwa) was a big feline deity that lives in sky and was able to bring the rain, the storms, the rainbow and hail. Qhoa was depicted as a large winged flying feline (that can be a puma, a jaguar or an oscollo). As a deity considered to be the bringer of rain and storms that help the growth of crops and fertilization of the earth (similar to god Illapa), Incas worshiped it fervently. The Qhoa was a benevolent deity to whom they asked for rain, and it was granted. But like all sacred beings, Qhoa also launched its punishments through hail or storms. It's believed this deity jumped from cloud to cloud, dropping lightning bolts that come out of its eyes to the earth, its loud roar was the thunder, its urine was the rain and the flapping of its large wings would be hail. In some andean communities they still say that Qhoa plays in the heights, entering and leaving the lagoons.
- Qoyllur (Star; a.k.a. Coyllur, Quyllur) was the goddess of the stars. Qoyllur also had an important position as a deity of light. She was the companion of Mama Killa. They were always together, since without Qoyllur's company, the nights would not have the same luminosity. The stars were a perfect complement.
- Rímac and Chaclla were two brother gods who sacrificed themselves to end a drought that plagued the coast in ancient times. Rímac became a river and Chaclla became the rain.
- Runacoto was a divinity associated with masculine virility. Due to this, people with a short penis went to ask him for help to grow their penises.
- Sorimana (A.k.a. Solimana) was a pre-inca god of volcanoes and earthquakes. Solimana also shares the name of a volcano located in Arequipa, Peru.
- Supay was both the god of death and ruler of the Uku Pacha as well as a race of demons. Supay was also the personification of all evilness. However, he was considered an ambivalent god that could be considered both evil and good. Supay was represented as a human figure with a strong resemblance to demons, having long horns and ears, a felinic head, very perceptive eyes and sharp teeth. Supay also has the ability to turn into a beautiful Inca woman as well as a very attractive Inca man. These abilities turned him into a danger for those who did not show respect or who tried to make fun of him. Despite this, there were people who believed in his great power, thus reaching the point of worshiping him, so that he would grant them favors for evil or good through rituals, offerings and the creation of altars. The ancient legends told that Supay went beyond that evil that he evoked, since they described him as the protector of the path that will be traveled when dying. Likewise, the Incas believed that after dying, the soul passes into the background. This background for them meant a new beginning with the Inca gods. Despite the description of the Supay as an evil being, he was good at the end of days for those who awaited his death, which made the Incas believe that since ancient times, the god Supay was a being that equilibrated the balance between the good and evil. In addition to giving them the feeling that there will always be evil, but not enough.
- Temenduare and Arikute were brother gods who, with their clashes, caused a flood. This as a result of conjuring a bestial being provided with a hundred legs of water. Temenduare and Arikute are thought to be other names for the gods Vichama and Mallko.
- Tumayricapac and Tumayhanampa were pre-inca twin gods from a region called Chinchaycocha. These two are associated with the lightning and are considered as civilizing heroes as well.
- Tunupa was the aymara god of volcanoes as well as lightning and water. According to Collasuyo's myths, Tunupa put order in the world and is often confused with Viracocha.
- Tulumanya (A.k.a. Turumanyay) was the first rainbow (rainbow of the ancients), who was born from the Amaru's chest on Viracocha's orders.
- Urcaguary was the inca deity of metals, jewels and other underground trinkets of great value. The gender of this deity is ambiguous, so it can be a feminine or masculine divinity. Urcaguary resides beneath mountains protecting metals and jewels from evil people who dare to steal them. Urcaguary was represented with a snake body and a taruka head, gold chains and precious stones were linked in its snake tail. It's believed that the taruka or deer head is due to its way of thinking.
- Uru was the god of weaving, of quipus, of the word, but he was also connected to the sacredness of the original ancestors. So much so that, by using ancient threads in textiles and quipus, he was said to connect them to the sacred roots of the ancestors through the urupyachana ceremony. In the Andean worldview, the universe is conceived as a great living and interconnected tapestry, where everything is related through symbolic threads (time, space, natural cycles, lineages, cosmic forces). Uru, as the spider god, embodies the primordial weaver who maintains this coherence: he weaves the continuity between time and space, and through quipus and textiles he codifies and transmits ancestral knowledge. His ritual action preserves the holistic balance of reality, preventing existential disconnection.
- Urquchillay was the god of cattle and domestic animals. Urquchillay was worshipped mainly by Inca herders because he watched over animals and maintained the welfare of the herds and multiply their offspring. Urquchillay was represented as a strong man with a llama head as well as a multicoloured llama or ram.
- Urpihuachay (The one that gives birth to pigeons; a.k.a. Urpihuachac, Urpayhuachac, Urpayhuachay) was the creator goddess of the birds and fishes, coming originally from Chincha culture and later adopted by the Inca pantheon as wife of Pachakamaq in some legends. She's depicted as a woman with mixed fish and bird traits. In one legend, it's said after Cavillace and her son jumped into the sea and turned into two isles in front of the sanctuary of the god Pachakamaq, Coniraya decided to get revenge against Pachakamaq and sought Urpihuachay and her daughters with the attempt to rape them, the goddess wasn't there, she was visiting Cavillace already turned into an island, Coniraya took advantage and found the goddess daughters, fortunately, they could escape from the angered god by turning themselves into birds and flying far away. Coniraya still angered, threw all Urpihuachay's belongings to the sea, among them, the fishes only Urpihuachay knew how to raise, these were thrown in ponds near the temple, once in the sea, fishes multiplied since then and Urpihuachay was considered as the mother of all birds and fishes.
- Vichama (A.k.a. Wichama, Atipa) was the son of the sun god (Wiracocha or Inti) in Vichama's myth. This established Vichama as the brother of Mallko and the half-brother of Pachakamaq and Kon. He was created by the sun god from the umbilical cord and navel of Mallko's, his brother, which were torn to pieces by Pachakamaq's wrath. In the aforementioned myth, Vichama was a divinity associated with revenge, death and, to a lesser extent, with war.
- Viracocha (Quechua: Apu Kon Illa Tiqsi Wiraqucha Pachayachachiq Pachakamaq; English: Great Lord, eternal light, source of life, knowledge and creator of the world) was the god of everything. It's said he came from the sea and created the sun, the moon and the stars to light up the world that was immersed in darkness. Viracocha also created time (ordering the sun to move itself in the sky). Following the creation, he created the humanity by blowing on the stones. However, his first attempt to create humanity failed as they turned out to be strong and violent giants with no intelligence. (In other legends, the first attempt was conceived before the creation of the sun and humanity turned out to be Ñawpa Machus, which means "the primordial old ones" , who are depicted as tall and skinny humans. Despite this fact, they had a brutal strength and were as violent as evil, and so Viracocha created the sun, creating the light that put an end to them). The giants didn't recognize Viracocha as their creator and they rebelled against him. Viracocha sent a devastating flood that destroyed them, and from the remaining small stones, he created a better version of humanity. Viracocha had a lot of representations around the civilizations and cultures that worshiped him, the most known is that of a sun crown man or anthropomorphic man with two staffs or lightning bolts in his hands on a platform. Viracocha's face had tears in the form of rain. It's said he wept when he saw the suffering of the creatures he had created. Viracocha was also associated with the puma. Another representation of him was a stone with egg's shape which is considered a cosmic egg. Viracocha was present as the creator of everything in existence in several ancient civilizations and cultures around South America like Sechin culture, Caral-Supe civilization, Chavín culture, Wari culture, Tiwanaku, etc. Incas weren't the exception, they considered Viracocha as the creator of all the cosmos as well as the substance that gives rise to all of things. In the beginning he was the main god, but when Pachakuti became Inca emperor, he changed this god's importance to prioritize Inti as the most important god due to Inti's support against the Chankas, which turned the Inca Kingdom of Cusco into a great and prosperous empire. Despite this fact, Viracocha was still worshiped fervently, but just the Sapa Incas or emperors were allowed to worship him, leaving Inti as the main god of the Inca people.
- Wasikamayuq (The one who takes care of home) was the tutelary god of home. Wasikamayuq was supported by other deities like Qhaxra-kamayuq, as they both ensured security in Inca homes.
- Yanañamca and Tutañamca (Huaca of the darkness and Huaca of the night) were the twin gods of darkness and night. They ruled the world at the beginning of time, before the gods took care of the earth. Viracocha sent Huallallo Carhuincho, god of fire, to defeat them and, at the same time, illuminate the earth, although the latter stayed taking advantage of it and devouring his faithful ones.
- Yana Raman (A.k.a. Libiac Cancharco, Libiac) was the pre-inca god of lightning. He's considered as the main god and hence the creator of an ethnic group called Yaros or Llacuaces. Likewise, he's considered as the base of the cult of god Illapa. When the Incas assimilated Yaros within Tahuantinsuyo, the god Yana Raman was renewed as the god Illapa.
- Yastay or Llastay - Aymara protector of vicuña and other camelids as well as the condor.

== Important beliefs ==
- Mama Uqllu was the sister and wife of Manqu Qhapaq. She was thought to have taught the Inca the art of spinning.
- Mamaconas were similar to nuns and lived in temple sanctuaries. They dedicated their lives to Inti, and served the Inca and priests. Young girls of the nobility or of exceptional beauty were trained for four years as acllas and then had the option of becoming mamaconas or marrying Inca nobles. They are comparable to the Roman Vestal Virgins, though Inca society did not value virginity as a virtue the way Western societies have done throughout history.
- In one legend, Unu Pachakuti was a great flood sent by Virachocha to destroy the giants that built Tiwanaku.
- A Wak'a was a sacred object such as a mountain or a mummy.
- Ancestor worship has been a staple of Andean society before, during, and after the Inca Empire. The traditional communities of the Andes are known as ayllu which are familial clans that trace their origins to a common ancestor. A form of ancestor worship practiced by the Inca was the mummification and respect for their deceased relatives' remains. These mummies would be provided food, drink, clothing, and valuable items, they were considered links to the family and the gods and were consulted when the family needed spiritual advice. The panaqa was a family formed by all of the descendants of the king, Sapa Inka with only the son and heir being excluded from this family. The reason for this is so the Auqui, crown prince, forms his own panaqa. One of the major functions of the panaqa was to maintain the mummy and the memory of deceased Sapa Inca's.
- Illa Teqsi is a fundamental concept in the ancestral Andean worldview, especially in the more spiritual and philosophical pre-Inca and Inca wisdom. It should not be confused with Viracocha, the anthropomorphized creator god of the late Inca pantheon. Illa Teqsi is more abstract and older, and many Andean spiritual traditions consider it the true root of everything. It is not simply a deity, but a primordial source of existence comparable to metaphysical ideas such as the Tao or Ain Sof.

== Important places ==
The environment and geography were integral part of Inca mythology as well. Many prominent natural features within the Inca Empire were tied to important myths and legends amongst the Inca. For example, Lake Titicaca, an important body of water on the Altiplano, was incorporated into Inca myths, as the lake of origins from which the world began. Similarly, many of prominent Andean peaks played special roles within the mythology of the Incas. This is reflected in myths about the Paxil mountain, from which people were alleged to have been created from corn kernels that were scattered by the gods. Terrestrial environments were not the only type of environment that was important to mythology. The Incas often incorporated the stars into legends and myths. For example, many constellations were given names and were incorporated into stories, such as the star formations of the Great Llama and the Fox. While perhaps not relating to a single physical feature per se, environmental sound was extremely important in Incan mythology. For example, in the creation myth of Viracocha the sound of the god's voice is particularly important. Additionally, myths were transmitted orally, so the acoustics and sound of a location were important for Incan mythology. These examples demonstrate the power that environment held in creating and experiencing Incan myths.

The most important temple in the Inca Empire was known as Coricancha ("The Golden Temple" in Quechua) which was located in the heart of Incan Cusco and according to Inca legend was built by Manco Cápac as a place of worship for the principle deity of the Inca, the sun god Inti. During the reign of Pachakutiq Inca this temple was the home of the riches of the Inca Empire, housing gold, important religious artifacts, and gilded effigies of important Incan deities. The Coricancha being in the heart of Cusco, which is in the heart of the Inca Empire, is the point of convergence of the 41 pathways leading out of Cusco into the rest of the empire with a system called ceque, which served a political, religious, and administrative role in the Inca Empire. The Coricancha was the site of important religious ceremonies, such as during the Inti Raymi in which after a procession through Cusco, the Sapa Inka would enter the Coricancha. In the temple concave mirrors would focus the sun's rays to light a fire for the sacrifice of llamas and in certain circumstances, children to please and pay tribute to the gods. The Coricancha also functioned as an observatory for the Inca, as it aligned with the sun on important days of the year such as solstices and equinoxes, alining the heavens and the earth, an important theme in the beliefs and religion of the Inca. Coricancha's use as an observatory was also useful for understanding when in the year the Inca were, and what food would be available throughout the year.

== Inca symbols ==
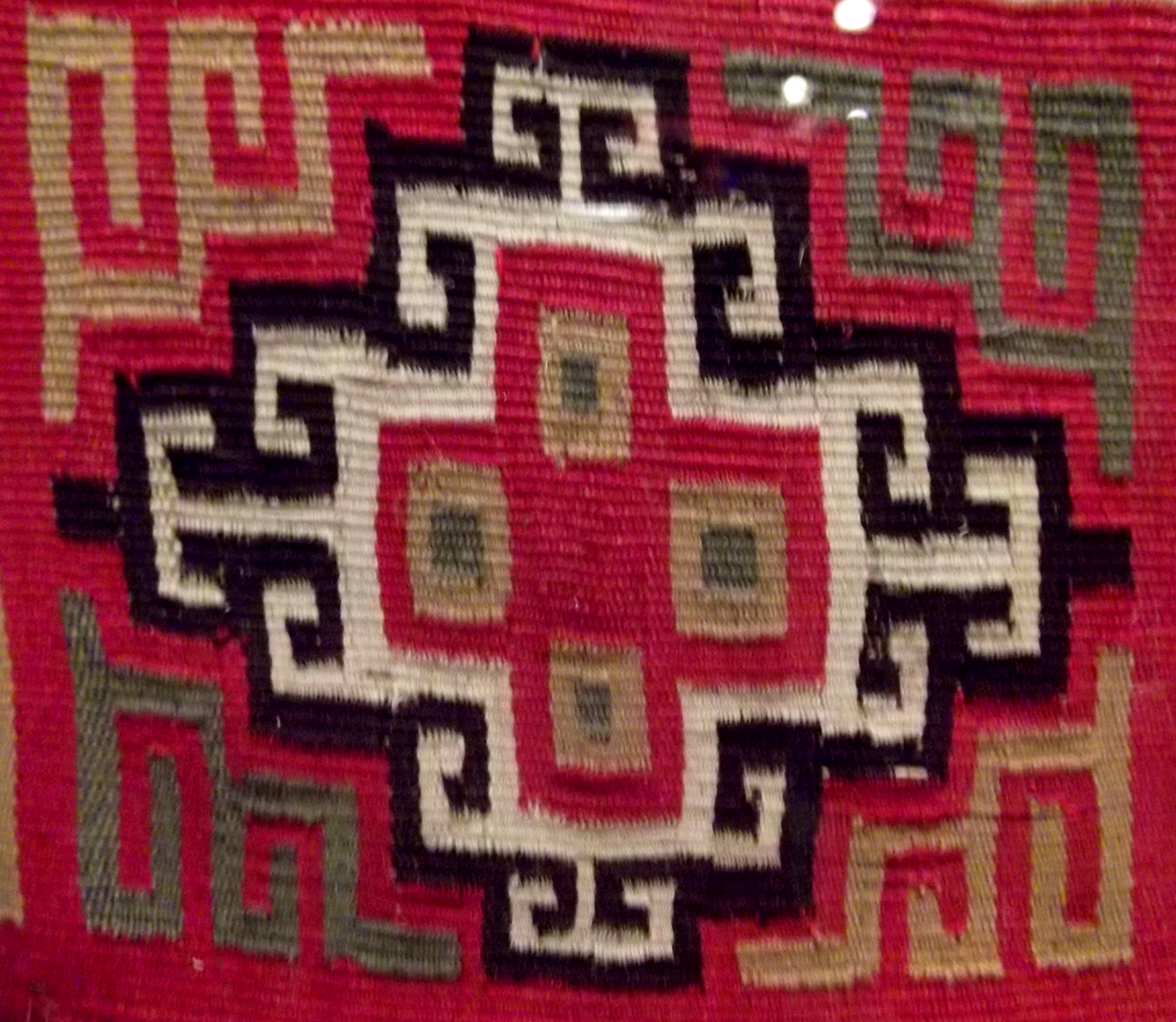
Chakana on an Inca Uncu

The Chakana (or Inca Cross) is, according to some modern authors, the three-stepped cross equivalent symbolic of what is known in other mythologies as the Tree of Life, World Tree and so on. Through a central axis a shaman journeyed in trance to the lower plane or Underworld and the higher levels inhabited by the superior gods to enquire into the causes of misfortune on the Earth plane. The snake, puma, and condor are totemic representatives of the three levels. The alleged meaning of the chakana symbol is not supported by scholarly literature.

Inti is the Inca sun god, which became the principle deity of the Inca Empire. The symbol of Inti is depicted on the historical Flag of Peru. The Sun has clear importance to the Incan civilization, which can even be seen in the architecture of the empire. The Ushnus, were buildings where the leading soldiers would pledge to be loyal towards the leadership of the Incan leadership, and these buildings have a deep connection to the sun. Evidence of sun god symbolism pre-Incan conquest can be found depicted on the Gate of the Sun constructed by the Tiwanaku culture.

== Deployments ==
Mythology served many purposes within the Incan Empire. Mythology could often be used to explain natural phenomena or to give the many denizens of the empire a way of thinking about the world. For example, there is a well-known origin myth that describes how the Incan Empire began at its center in Cusco. In this origin myth, four men and women emerged from a cave near Cusco, and began to settle within the Valley of Cusco, much to the chagrin of the Hualla people who had already been inhabiting the land. The Hualla subsided by growing coca and chili peppers, which the Incans associated with the peoples of the Amazon and who were perceived to be inferior and wild. The Inca engaged in battle with the Hualla, fighting quite viciously, and eventually the Inca emerged victorious. The myth alleges these first Inca people would plant corn, a mainstay of the Inca diet, on the location where they viciously defeated the Hualla. Thus, the myth continues, the Inca came to rule over the entire Cusco Valley, before eventually going on to conquer much of the Andean world.

In creating this myth, the Incans reinforced their authority over the empire. Firstly, by associating the Hualla with plants from the jungle, the Inca's origin myth would have likely caused the listener to think that the Hualla were primitive compared to the superior Inca. Thus, the Inca's defeat of the Hualla and their supposed development of maize based agriculture, supported the notion that the Inca were the rightful stewards of the land, as they were able to make the land productive and tame. These myths were reinforced in the many festivals and rites that were celebrated throughout the Incan Empire. For example, there were corn festivals that were celebrated annually during the harvest. During these festivals the Inca elite were celebrated alongside the corn and the main deity of the Inca, Inti. As such, the myth of original Inca's planting of the corn crop was utilized to associate the ruling Inca elite with the gods, as well as portraying them as being the bringers of the harvest. In this way, the origin myths of the Inca were used to justify the elite position of the Inca within their vast, multiethnic empire. Within the Inca Empire, the Inca held a special status of "Inca by Blood", that granted them significant privileges over non-Inca peoples. The ability of the Inca to support their elite position was no small feat, given that less than fifty thousand Inca were able to rule over millions of non-Inca peoples. Mythology was an important way by which the Inca were able to justify both the legitimacy of the Inca state, as well as their privileged position with the state.

The strategic deployment of Incan mythology did not end after the Incan empire was colonized by the Spanish. In fact, Incan mythology was utilized in order to resist and challenge the authority of the Spanish colonial authorities. Many Incan myths were utilized to criticize the wanton greed of European imperialism. There was widespread killing and rape of women and children in Peru by the European soldiers. For example, there are myths among the indigenous people of the former Inca empire that tell the stories of foreigners who come into the Andes and destroy valuable objects. One such myth is the tale of Atoqhuarco amongst the Quechua, which describes how an indigenous woman is destroyed in an act of rebellion against a lascivious foreigner who in turn is eventually transformed into a predatory fox. Powerful colonial institutions are also critiqued in some of these myths, with the Catholic Church being frequently lambasted. For example, the story of the Priest and Sexton highlights the hypocrisy and abusive nature of a Catholic Priest and his callous treatment of his indigenous parishioners. As such, these myths show that Inca mythology was strategically deployed to subvert and rebel against Spanish rule in the former Incan Empire.

Incan mythology continues to be a powerful force in contemporary Andean communities. After the nations that were once a part of the Incan Empire gained their independence from Spain, many of these nations struggled to find a suitable origin myth to support the legitimacy of their state. In the early twentieth century, there was a resurgence of interest about the indigenous heritage of these new nations. While these references to Inca mythology can be more overt, such as the presence of Inti on the Argentine flag, other references to the Inca mythology can be subtler. For example, in the late twentieth century the Peruvian Revolutionary government made reference to Inca myths about Pachamama, an Inca Mother Earth figure, in order to justify their land distribution programs. Additionally, modern governments continue to make reference to the former Inca Empire in order to support their claims of legitimacy, to the point that there are municipally funded observances of rituals referencing Inca mythology, especially in and around Cusco. The power of Incan mythology resonates in contemporary politics, with politicians like Alejandro Toledo making references to Inca mythology and imagery during their candidacies and tenures. While the Inca Empire may have ceased to exist hundreds of years ago, its vibrant mythology continues to influence life throughout Peru today.

== Animals in Inca religion ==
Inca society was influenced by the local animal populations, both as food, textile, and transport sources, as well as religious and cultural cornerstones. Many myths and legends of the Inca include or are solely about an animal or a mix of animals and their interactions with the gods, humans, and or natural surroundings. Animals were also important in Incan astronomy, with the Milky Way symbolized as a river, with the stars within it being symbolized as animals that the Inca were familiar with in and around this river.

=== Llamas ===
Llamas were important to the economy of the vast Incan Empire, they could be used for wool, transportation of goods, and food. They also played a major role in the religious lives of the Inca, being a valuable sacrifice to the gods and used in important religious ceremonies as offerings. Urcuchillay was a god worshipped by the Inca, in particular llama herders. Urcuchillay was believed to protect and watch over the llamas of the land. Llama artwork created by the Inca shows further reverence towards llamas; an example of this is a depiction of a llama constructed out of pure gold, an extremely valuable material for the Inca because of its religious significance as it was considered the sweat of the sun, the most worshipped deity for the Inca, Inti.

=== Pumas ===
The Inca had religious reverence for the cougar, commonly known as a puma in South America. The Incas believed the puma to represent power and strength, as well as patience and wisdom. The original Inca Capital Cusco took the shape of a puma, with the massive citadel of Sacsayhuaman representing the head of the puma. The site of Qenko north of Cusco contains monoliths and astronomically aligned structures, which on certain days create light and shadow effects. At the June solstice sunrise, light passes through a carefully designed fissure aligned to illuminate first one of the gnomons and then the other, with both casting shadows that create an image. The result is known as "the awakening of the puma" The puma is also associated with wealth and prosperity. The Huarochiri Manuscript mentions how it was a practice of the Inca to wear puma skins to display their wealth.

=== Condors ===
For the Inca, the condor was believed to connect the earthly world of man, Kay Pacha, with the upper world and the gods, Hanan Pacha. Believed to be the messengers of heaven to men, and the Inca to their patron deity, Inti. Today, the people of the Andes still hold the condor as sacred. In some towns, the Andean ritual of the "Yawar Fiesta", or Blood Festival, is still being celebrated. In this festival condors fight bulls, with the condor representing the Inca, while the bull represents the Spaniards.

=== Dogs ===
The Inca bred dogs for hunting and scavenging but rarely for religious purposes. The Huanca people, however, had a much more religious basis for their consumption of dog meat as in Inca mythology Paria Caca, their god, was pictured as feeding solely on dog after he defeated another god, Huallallo Carhuincho, in a skirmish. In some parts of South America the Huanca are referred to as "the dog-eating Huanca". This behaviour of eating dog was looked down upon in other parts of the empire.

There also exists a city named Alqollacta, or "Dog town", which contains statues of dogs and are thought to represent the souls of dogs that have died. The people would often save up bones and leave them at the statues so that it would give them a better standing in the afterlife.

Dogs were sometimes believed to be able of moving between life and death and also see the soul of the dead. In addition, the Inca believed that unhappy dead souls could visit people in the form of black dogs. The Aymara people of Bolivia were reported to believe that dogs were associated with death and incest. They believed that those who die must cross an ocean to the afterlife in the ear of, or on the nose of, a black dog. Additionally, some sources report that women who sleep alone at night were capable of being impregnated by ghosts which would yield a baby with dog feet.

=== Bears ===
Despite there only being one bear species in South America (the spectacled bear, Tremarctus ornatus), the story of The Bear's Wife and Children is a prominent story among the Inca. The Andean people believed that bears represented the sexual habits of men and women and the girls were warned of "bear-rape". This story details a bear who disguises himself as a man who subdues a girl and takes her to his cave where he feeds her and takes care of her. Soon after, she bares two half bear half human children. With the help of the children the three are able to escape the cave and return to human society. The bear children are given to the town's priest who attempts to kill the cubs several times (by throwing them off buildings, sending them into the wild, sending them to fight officers) but is only capable of getting the younger bear-child killed. The older bear beats the trials and is sent to fight a damned soul, which he defeats and saves from damnation. The soul gives the bear his estate and wealth and the now fully grown bear man leaves human society as a white dove. This tale could be interpreted as a Native American's plight story against the Hispanic society in which they find them in, which becomes more believable as this folklore become more prominent after the Spanish Conquest.

In addition to this story, half bear half human beings called Ukuku are thought to be the only being that are able to bring ice from the top of mountains as they have the intelligence of men but the strength of bears. Ukuku clowns can be seen in the Corpus Christi celebrations of Cuzco where they undergo pilgrimage to a nearby glacier and spend the night on the ice as an initiation of manhood.

=== Foxes ===
The fox did not generally have a good reputation among the Inca or people of the Andes and was seen as an omen. Sacrifices to the gods included a variety of goods and animals, including humans, but were never seen to ever include foxes. Inca mythology contains references to gods being deceived by foxes. In one encounter, the deity Cuniraya Viracocha was angered by a fox and stated that "As for you, even when you skulk around keeping your distance, people will thoroughly despise you and say 'That fox is a thief!'. When they kill you they'll carelessly throw you away and your skin too". In other narratives, the fox is said to have tried to steal the moon but the moon hugged the fox close which resulted in the spots on the moon. Finally, the fox still plays a role in current Andean society where the howling of a fox in the month of August is perceived as a sign of good luck.

The Inca had indigenous names for constellations as well as interstellar clouds (dark nebulae) visible from the Southern hemisphere. The fox (Atoq in quechua) is the name for one dark nebulae in the milky way, and Andean narratives, including Inca ones, may refer to the dark nebulae rather than the animal.

== See also ==
- Garcilaso de la Vega (chronicler)
- Guaman Poma
- Religion in the Inca Empire
- Huarochirí Manuscript
