= Paqariq Tampu =

Mythical place in Incan mythology

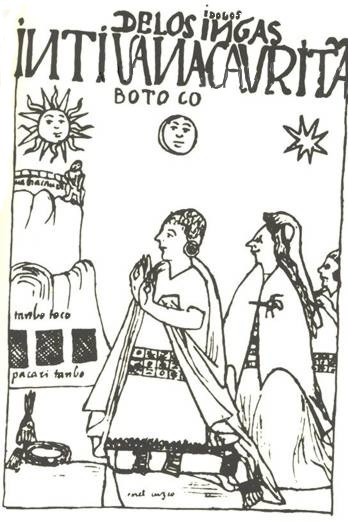
Guaman Poma's First New Chronicle (1615): "Idolos de los ingas Inti, Vanacauri, Tambotoco" ( 'Idols of the Incas: Inti, Wanakawri and Tampu T'uqu')

In Inca mythology, one of the main Incan creation myths was that of the Ayar Brothers, who emerged from a cave called Paqariq Tampu (also spelled Paqariqtampu) (Quechua paqariy 'to dawn, to be born', -q a suffix, tampu 'inn, lodge'; hispanicized and mixed spellings Pacaritambo, Paccarectambo, Paccarec Tambo, Paccarictambo, Paccaric Tambo, Paqariq Tambo, Paccaritambo).

This "house of production" was located on the hill called Tampu T'uqu (Quechua t'uqu 'niche, hole or gap in the wall', today also the modern word for 'window'; hispanicized Tambotoco, Tamputoco). It had three windows. According to the myth, the tribe of Maras emerged from one of the niches, called Maras T'uqu (Maras tocco) by spontaneous generation. The tribe of Tampus emerged from the sut'i t'uqu window. Manco Capac, his three Ayar brothers, and his four Mama sisters, emerged from the chief window in the middle, the qhapaq t'uqu.

Pachacuti visited the site and "venerated the locality and showed his feeling by festivals and sacrifices. He placed doors of gold on the window qhapaq tu'uqu, and ordered that from that time forward the locality should be venerated by all, making it a prayer place and wak'a, whither to go to pray for oracles and to sacrifice."
