= Pacha Kamaq =

Incan creator god

- God, the creator, the animator, the destroyer, and the source of duality
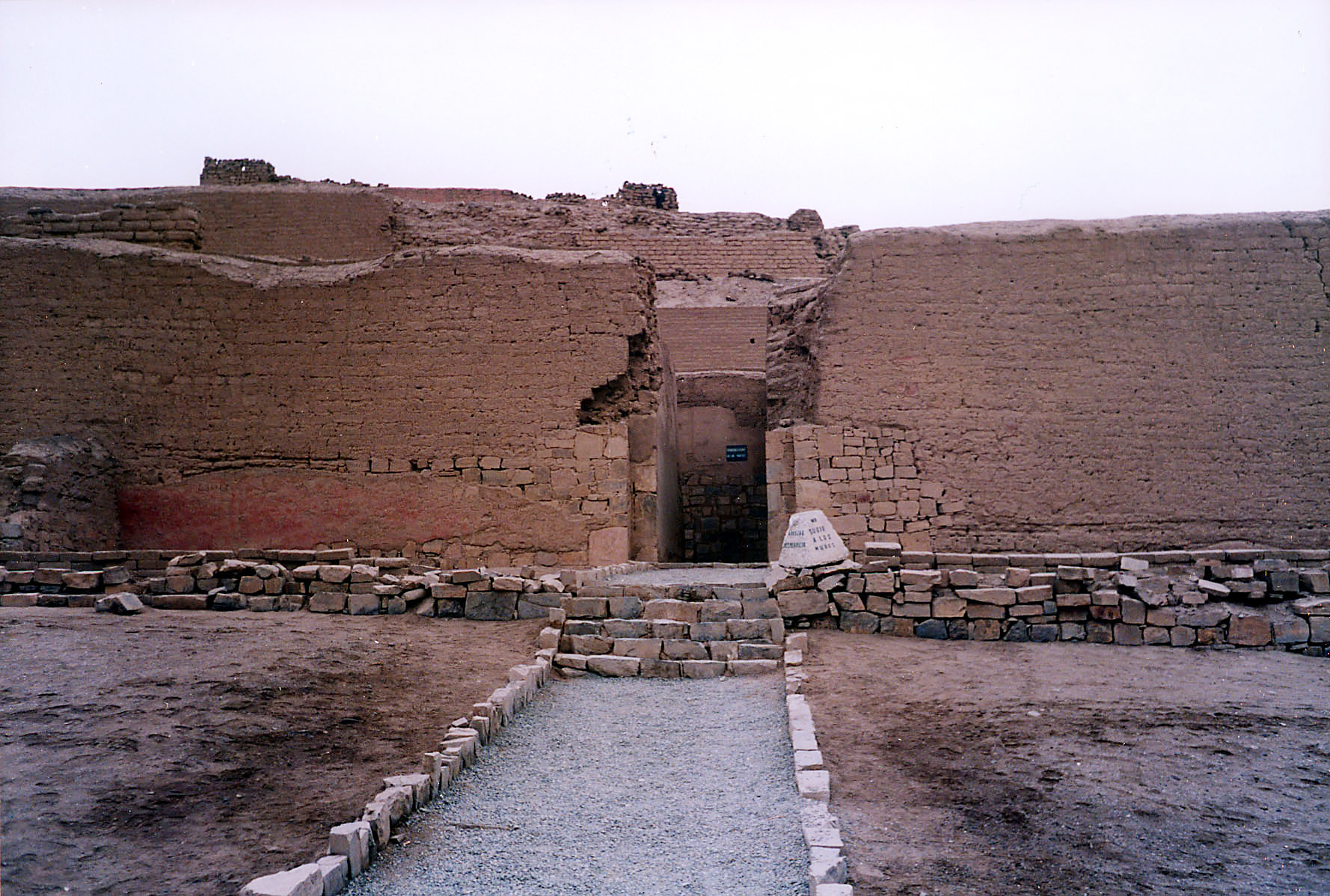
- The creator deity Pacha Kamaq was venerated at this temple by the Ichma.
- Major cult center: Ichma
- Consort: Mama Pacha
- Offspring: Inti, Killa

Pachacamac or Pacha Kamaq (pronounced [ˈpatʃa ˈkamaχ]) is the creator god and animator of the entire universe. Likewise, he was the one who controlled the balance in the world.

Like other Andean gods, Pachacamac is a god with multiple attributes. Among these attributes are fire, the sky, night, earth, earthquakes, etc.

The god Pachacamac enjoyed high prestige on the central coast of the Inca Empire and his influence was such that he was commonly considered a re-edition of the god Viracocha.

The sacred Quechua song called Yayallay is an ancient religious hymn of Inca origin that was transcribed by Blas Valera. In this song, a young Inca student at the yachahuasi, a school for the nobility, asks the three gods Illapa, Inti, and Pachacamac for many children of his royal blood (Valera 1618:c.5v), but at the same time affirms that Pachacamac has neither beginning nor end; he also addresses Pachamama, whom these gods impregnate.

Tahuantinsuyu adopted Pacha Kamaq when they incorporated the Ichma into their empire. In late Inca mythology he was the father of Inti and Mama Killa, and husband of Mama Pacha. The Wari, the Pachacamac empire, Chancay, Chimor and Ichma possessed the city of Pachacamac at some point but it is unknown if any other peoples, apart from the Ichma, worshipped the Pacha Kamaq deity.

Likewise, Pachacamac was considered "the creator" in the cultures of Lima, Chancay, Ichma, Huari and Chincha.

== Etymology ==
The name of the god Pachacámac, often written simply as <Pachacama> in 16th-century sources, is entirely Quechua in origin. It is a nominalized verbal phrase, based on the noun pacha (“earth, world, space, time, universe, totality, era”) and the verb kamay (“to sustain, to create, to animate”), together with the agent nominalizer -q.

The relative phrase thus formed poses some translation problems, as it can be translated as “he who creates the world” or “he who sustains the universe,” among others.

== Concept ==
Some sources considered Pachacámac to be a god who, similar to his counterpart Viracocha, was invisible and unknown, since no one had ever seen him. This description portrays the god Pachacámac in the same way as his counterpart: an omnipotent, omnipresent, and omniscient god. However, for some scholars, the above description belongs more to a universal principle (an abstract and impersonal concept) than to a god himself.

Among the aforementioned sources is that provided by the famous chronicler Inca Garcilaso de la Vega. In his work Royal Commentaries, Garcilaso describes Pachacámac as follows:

"They held Pachacámac in greater inner veneration than the Sun, which, as I have said, they did not dare to mention by name, whereas they named the Sun at every turn. When asked who Pachacámac was, they said that he was the one who gave life to the universe and sustained it, but that they did not know him because they had not seen him, and that for this reason they did not build temples or offer sacrifices to him, but rather worshipped him in their hearts (that is, mentally) and considered him an unknown God." («Tuvieron al Pachacámac en mayor veneración interior que al Sol, que, como he dicho, no osaban tomar su nombre en la boca, y al Sol le nombran a cada paso. Preguntado quién era el Pachacámac, decían que era el que daba vida al universo y le sustentaba, pero que no le conocían porque no le habían visto, y que por esto no le hacían templos ni le ofrecían sacrificios, mas que lo adoraban en su corazón (esto es mentalmente) y le tenían por Dios no conocido.»)

Comentarios Reales de los Incas, Capítulo II

However, Garcilaso's description seems to refer more to how the nobility perceived the figure of Pachacámac than to the population of Tahuantinsuyo in general.

The chronicler also mentions that the Incas, like other cultures, came to question the supremacy of their main god, in this case, the Sun.

The same source mentions that the Inca Tupac Yupanqui, questioning the hegemony of the sun, is said to have said the following:

"Many say that the Sun lives and is the maker of all things; it is fitting that he who does something should attend to the thing he does, but many things are done while the Sun is absent; therefore, it is not the creator of all things; and that it is not alive can be deduced from the fact that it never tires of turning: if it were alive, it would tire like us, or if it were free, it would visit other parts of the sky, where it never goes. It is like a tethered animal, always circling in the same place; or like an arrow that goes where it is sent and not where it would like to go." («Muchos dicen que el Sol vive y que es el hacedor de todas las cosas; conviene que el que hace alguna cosa asista a la cosa que hace, pero muchas cosas se hacen estando el Sol ausente; luego, no es el hacedor de todas las cosas; y que no vive se colige de que dando siempre vueltas no se cansa: si fuera cosa viva se cansara como nosotros, o si fuera libre llegara a visitar otras partes del cielo, a donde nunca jamás llega. Es como una res (llama) atada, que siempre hace un mismo cerco; o es como la saeta que va donde la envían y no donde ella querría»)

Comentarios Reales de los Incas, Capítulo VIII

Continuing with the source, Inca Huayna Capac also expressed such doubts about the hegemony of the sun cult. While Huayna Capac was talking to a priest, the Inca said to him:

"I want to ask you two questions in response to what you have told me. I am your King and universal lord. Would any of you be so bold as to order me to rise from my seat and travel a long way?

The priest replied, “Who would be so foolish as to do that?”

The Inca replied, “And would there be any curaca among my vassals, however rich and powerful he might be, who would not obey me if I ordered him to go by post from here to Chili?”

The priest said, “No, Inca, there would be no one who would not obey you to the death in everything you commanded him.”

The Inca then said: “Well, I tell you that Our Father the Sun must have another lord greater and more powerful than himself. He commands him to travel this path that he travels every day without stopping, because if he were the Supreme Lord, he would stop walking from time to time and rest at his leisure, even if he had no need to do so.”"

(«Quiero hacerte dos preguntas para responder a lo que me has dicho. Yo soy vuestro Rey y señor universal, ¿habría alguno de vosotros tan atrevido que por su gusto me mandase levantar de mi asiento y hacer un largo camino?

Respondió el sacerdote: «¿Quién habría tan desatinado como eso?».

Replicó el Inca: «¿Y habría algún curaca de mis vasallos, por más rico y poderoso que fuese, que no me obedeciese si yo le mandase ir por la posta de aquí a Chili?».

Dijo el sacerdote: «No, Inca, no habría alguno que no lo obedeciese hasta la muerte todo lo que le mandases». El Inca dijo entonces: «Pues yo te digo que este Nuestro Padre el Sol debe de tener otro mayor señor y más poderoso que no él. El cual le manda hacer este camino que cada día hace sin parar, porque si él fuera el Supremo Señor, una vez que otra dejara de caminar, y descansara por su gusto, aunque no tuviera necesidad alguna».)

Comentarios Reales de los Incas, Capítulo X

== Features ==
=== Ychsma renamed Pachacamac ===
Before being incorporated into the Inca pantheon, Pachacámac was known by the names Ychsma, Ichma, or Irma. The link between the coastal deity and the Tahuantinsuyo was established diplomatically by the Inca Tupac Yupanqui.

The historian Hernando de Santillán emphasizes this relationship in his work Relación del origen, descendencia, política y gobierno de los Incas (Account of the Origin, Descent, Politics, and Government of the Incas). In this work, the historian mentions the following:

"The worship of guacas, [...] is a modern introduction by Topa Inga, and they say that the origin of worshipping guacas and tenellas as gods arose because when Topa Inga's mother was pregnant with him, she spoke from her womb and said that the Maker of the Earth was in the Yungas, in the Irma Valley. After a long time, when Topa Inga was already a man and a lord, his mother told him what had happened, and once he knew, he decided to go and find the Maker of the Earth in the valley of Irma, which is now called Pachacama, and there he spent many days in prayer and fasted many times. and after forty days, Pachacama spoke to him, saying that he was the Maker of the Earth, and told him that he was very happy to have found him, and that he was the one who gave life to all things below, and that the Sun was his brother and gave life to those above [...] The guaca told them through the stone from which he spoke that [...] they should build him a house. Then the Inca had it built in his presence, and it is a building that still stands today, tall and sumptuous, which they call the great guaca of Pachacama, on a large mound of earth that seems almost entirely man-made, with the building on top of it; and there the guaca told the Inca that his name was Pachacama, which means the one who gives life to the Earth; and so the name of the valley was changed from Irma to Pachacama."

(«La adoración de las guacas, […] es moderna introducción por Topa Inga, y dicen que el origen del adorar las guacas y tenellas por dios, nascio de que estando la madre de dicho Topa Inga prenada del, hablo en el vientre y dijo quel Hacedor de la Tierra estaba en los yungas, en el valle de Irma. Despues de mucho tiempo, siendo ya hombre y senor el dicho Topa Inga, la madre le dijo lo que pasaba, y sabido por él, determino de ir a buscar el Hacedor de la Tierra al dicho valle de Irma, que es el que agora se dice Pachacama, y alli estuvo muchos días en oración y hizo muchos ayunos, y al cabo de cuarenta dias le hablo el Pachacama, quellos disen era Hacedor de la Tierra, y le dijo que habia sido muy dichoso en hallarle, y quel era el que daba ser a todas las cosas de aca abajo y quel Sol era su hermano y daba ser a lo de arriba […] la guaca les dijo por aquella piedra en que los hablaba, que […] le edificasen una casa. Luego el Inga la hizo edificar en su presencia, que es un edificio que hoy está en pie, de grande altura y suntuosidad, a que llaman la grande guaca de Pachacama, sobre un grande monte de tierra que casi todo parece hecho a mano y encima el edificio; y allí le dijo la guaca al Inga que su nombre era Pachacama, que quiere decir el que da ser a la Tierra; y así se mudó el nombre del dicho valle de Irma y le quedo Pachacama.»)

Relación del origen, descendencia, política y gobierno de los Incas (1563)

=== The true idol of Pachacamac ===
According to Hernando Pizarro, brother of the conquistador Francisco Pizarro, who wrote an account of his visit to Pachacámac, the idol was destroyed and its treasure captured to be taken to Cajamarca.

In his "Carta a los magníficos señores oidores de la audiencia real de Santo Domingo sobre la conquista del Perú (1533)", he states that:

"The cave where the idol was kept was very dark, so dark that it was impossible to enter without a torch, and very dirty inside. I made all the chiefs of the region who had come to see me go inside so that they would lose their fear; and in the absence of a preacher, I gave them my sermon, telling them about the deception in which they were living."

(«La cueva donde estaba el ídolo era muy oscura, que no se podía entrar a ella sin candela, y dentro muy sucia. Hice a todos los caciques de la comarca que me vinieron a ver entrar dentro para que perdiesen el miedo; y a falta de predicador, les hice mi sermón diciendo el engaño en que vivían.»)

Carta a los magníficos señores oidores de la audiencia real de Santo Domingo sobre la conquista del Perú (1533)

Francisco López de Xerez, secretary to Francisco Pizarro, clearly stated that there were several replicas of the idol of Pachacámac around the main enclosure that was desecrated by Hernando Pizarro. López de Xerez described it as follows:

"He was in a nice house, well painted and well furnished, and in a very dark and smelly room, very closed off, they have an idol made of very dirty wood, and they say that it is their god, the one who raises and sustains them and provides for them. At its feet they had offered some gold jewelry. [...] Throughout the streets of this town, and at its main gates, and around this house, they have many wooden idols, and they worship them in imitation of their devil."

(«Él estaba en una buena casa, bien pintada y bien aviada y en una sala muy oscura y hedionda, muy cerrada, tienen un ídolo hecho de palo muy sucio, y aquél dicen que es su dios, el que los cría y sostiene y cría los mantenimientos. A los pies de él tenían ofrecidas algunas joyas de oro. [...] Por todas las calles de este pueblo, y a las puertas principales de él, y a la redonda de esta casa tienen muchos ídolos de palo, y los adoran a imitación de su diablo.»)

Verdadera relación de la conquista del Perú y provincia del Cuzco llamada la Nueva Castilla (1534)

This data indicates that the true idol of Pachacámac was completely different and that, since it was destroyed, there is no information about what that true idol might have looked like.

=== Pachacámac and the figure of the fox ===
The god Pachacámac is associated with multiple elements. Among them is his evident association with canines.

In this regard, Cristóbal de Albornoz offers a description of Pachacámac. The extirpator of idolatries refers to the deity as:

"Pachacamac, the main treasure of the Indians of the province of Ychmay, the most important in this kingdom, was a golden fox that stood on a hill, handmade, next to the town of Pachacama."

(«Pachacamac, guaca prencipal de los indios de la dicha provincia de Ychmay, la más prencipal que ovo en este reino, era una zorra de oro que estava en un cerro, hecha a mano, junto al pueblo de Pachacama.»)

Instrucción para descubrir todas las guacas del Pirú y sus camayos y haziendas (1571)

This same fox had two representations, the first being the aforementioned idol made of gold and the other being the mummified body of the animal. Regarding the mummified body, Albornoz writes:

"Tantanamoc, from the Ychmas Indians, was a dead fox that lay at the door of Pachacamac."

(«Tantanamoc, de los dichos indios Ychmas, era una zorra muerta que estava a la puerta de la dicha Pachacamac.»)

Instrucción para descubrir todas las guacas del Pirú y sus camayos y haziendas (1571)

Information about Tantanamoc can also be found in the Huarochirí manuscript. Interestingly, in this manuscript, the figure of the fox is linked to telluric movements, which is one of the many associations of Pachacámac.

=== Pachacamac, the one who moves the world ===
The ancient Peruvians believed that Pachacámac only had to move his head slightly to cause massive cataclysms and that if he moved completely, the universe would come to an end.

This belief has been documented in the Huarochirí manuscript. The following can be read in this source:

"The Incas were well acquainted with all the huacas everywhere. And they ordered each huaca to hand over its gold and silver, as recorded in the quipus; they made them all hand it over, everywhere.

We call sacred silver and sacred gold the gold [...]. They made them give all these things according to what was recorded in the quipus. But the great huacas were not subject to these measures. Taking into account the established order, when they came to worship Llocllayhuancupa, they went the next day to Sucyahuillca to serve him, for they feared him because he was their father.

These are the truths we know about Pachacamac, whom they call “He who moves the world.” They say that when he gets angry, the world moves; that it also shakes when he turns his head to either side. That is why his head is immobile. “If his whole body rotated, the universe would end instantly,” the men said."

(«Los Incas conocían, pues, bien, a todos los huacas de todas partes. Y a cada huaca le mandaban entregar su oro y su plata, conforme estaba apuntado en los quipus; les hacían entregar a todos ellos y en todas partes.

Plata sagrada, oro sagrado le llamamos nosotros al oro […]. Todas esas cosas les hacían dar según estaba señalado en los quipus. Pero los grandes huacas no estaban sometidos a estas medidas. Teniendo en cuenta el orden establecido, cuando llegaban a adorar a Llocllayhuancupa, se dirigían, al día siguiente, hacia Sucyahuillca para servirle, pues le temían por ser quien era su padre. Estas son las verdades que sabemos de Pachacamac, a quien llaman «El que mueve al mundo». Dicen que cuando él se irrita, el mundo se mueve; que también se estremece cuando vuelve la cabeza a cualquier lado. Por eso tiene la cabeza inmóvil. «Si rotara todo el cuerpo, al instante se acabaría el universo», diciendo decían los hombres.»)

Manuscrito de Huarochirí, Capítulo 22

=== Pachacamac as god of the night ===
As seen above, Pachacámac is a god with multiple attributes. Although he is mostly known as a chthonic creator god, other sources establish him as a celestial creator god and, in certain cases, also highlight his nocturnal nature.

Sources that refer to Pachacámac as a god and/or personification of the night include myths and rituals that enshrined him with complete vehemence.

Many of these myths emphasize Pachacámac as an almighty, celestial god. One of the most notable examples of his connection to night is the myth of Vichama, Pachacámac's brother. In this myth, both gods express their opposition and complementarity, since they both personify the cycle of time: Vichama (day) and Pachacámac (night). One cannot exist and/or be defined as such (day and night) without the participation of the other, so it is an eternal duality that repeats itself endlessly.

This example of duality is also evident in the Huarochirí manuscript. This source tells the story of the powerful Cuniraya Huiracocha and subtly displays the god's daytime characteristics. The source establishes Pachacámac as the husband of Urpayhuáchac, the goddess who created birds and fish. With regard to Pachacámac, the texts merely mention him, as the god does not appear during the events of Cuniraya's story. This seems to evoke the nocturnal qualities of Pachacámac and, in essence, translates into the appearance of Cuniraya (day) after the disappearance of Pachacámac (night) and vice versa. This would be the main reason why the two gods are unable to meet.

Regarding rituals, chroniclers such as Francisco de Ávila have asserted that rituals dedicated to Pachacámac took place at night (especially during periods of full moon).

"Every year, people (from all provinces) of Tahuantinsuyo, women and men, offered him a Capac Hucha (sacrificing them).

When they arrived at Pachacámac, they buried alive (the victims of) that Capac Hucha, saying: “Here they are; I offer them to you, father.”

In the same way, they offered gold and silver and did not stop sacrificing llamas and making offerings of drink and food during the full moon."

(«Todos los años le ofrecían un Capac Hucha (sacrificándole) gente (de todas las provincias) del Tahuantinsuyo, mujeres y hombres.

Cuando llegaban a Pachacámac, enterraban vivas (a las víctimas de) ese Capac Hucha diciendo: «Helos aquí; te los ofrezco, padre». De la misma manera, (le ofrecían) oro y plata y no dejaban (de sacrificarle) llamas y de hacerle ofrendas de bebida y comida en la época de la luna llena.»)

Manuscrito de Huarochirí. Capítulo 22

The reason for the discrepancy between the numerous sources that depict Pachacámac with different powers and/or attributes may be because each aillu had its own distinct concept of the god Pachacámac. According to researcher María Rostworowski, it is possible that Pachacámac was a bipartite god and that the cult dedicated to him was divided into a pair of divinities that, in essence, formed a single and absolute entity: the Pachacámac above, who personifies Heaven (celestial god); and the Pachacámac below, who personifies the Earth and is responsible for unleashing violent movements and/or disturbances in the bowels of the Earth (chthonic god). This example of bipartition is also evident in other Andean gods such as Tunupa.

=== Pachacamac as equivalent to God ===
During the expansion of the Tahuantinsuyo along the coast, the Incas came to know the figure of the god Pachacámac. It was Pachacámac's various attributes that led the Incas to consider him a deity equivalent to the god Viracocha.

The equation between these two omnipotent gods has been perennial, even in times after the Inca Empire. This is reflected in the many descriptions that chroniclers and extirpators of idolatry have recorded in their works.

As an example of this, the work Comentarios reales emphasizes the spread of the cult dedicated to Tiqsi Wiraqucha under the name of Pachacámac.

"Having subdued any new province and ordered its principal idol to be taken to Cuzco, and having pacified the spirits of the lords and vassals, the Inca commanded that all the Indians, both priests and diviners as well as the rest of the common people, should worship the God Ticci Viracocha, by another name called Pachacamac, as the most powerful God, victorious over all the other gods."

(«Habiendo sujetado el Inca cualquiera nueva provincia y mandado llevar al Cozco el ídolo principal de ella, y habiendo apaciguado los ánimos de los señores y de los vasallos, mandaba que todos los indios, así sacerdotes y adivinos como la demás gente común, adorasen al Dios Ticci Viracocha, por otro nombre llamado Pachacámac, como a Dios poderosísimo, triunfador de todos los demás dioses.»)

Comentarios Reales de los Incas, Capítulo XIII

Huiracocha is generally considered to be the Andean equivalent of God; however, according to Garcilaso's perception, it is the god Pachacámac who holds that title.

"In addition to worshipping the Sun as the visible God, to whom they offered sacrifices and held great celebrations (as we will mention elsewhere), the Inca kings and their amautas, who were philosophers, sought with natural light the true supreme God and Lord, who created heaven and earth, as we shall see in the arguments and statements that some of them made about the Divine Majesty, whom they called Pachacámac: this name is composed of Pacha, which means world or universe, and Cámac, the present participle of the verb cama, which means to animate, a verb derived from the noun cama, which means soul. Pachacámac means the one who gives soul to the universe, and in its full and complete meaning, it means the one who does with the universe what the soul does with the body."

(«Además de adorar al Sol por Dios visible, a quien ofrecieron sacrificios e hicieron grandes fiestas (como en otro lugar diremos), los Reyes Incas y sus amautas, que eran los filósofos, rastrearon con lumbre natural al verdadero sumo Dios y Señor Nuestro, que crió el cielo y la tierra, como adelante veremos en los argumentos y sentencias que algunos de ellos dijeron de la Divina Majestad, al cual llamaron Pachacámac: es nombre compuesto de Pacha, que es mundo universo, y de Cámac, participio de presente del verbo cama, que es animar, el cual verbo se deduce del nombre cama, que es ánima. Pachacámac quiere decir el que da ánima al mundo universo, y en toda su propia y entera significación quiere decir el que hace con el universo lo que el ánima con el cuerpo.»)

Comentarios Reales de los Incas, Capítulo II

The Andean peoples did not conceive of the idea that good prevails over evil or vice versa, but rather that both are cosmic forces necessary for the continuity of the universe. According to the Andean worldview, all beings were dual, that is, they were neither completely benevolent nor completely evil. These are the reasons for the emergence of the concept of Pachacámac (or Viracocha) as equivalent to God; however, in order to illustrate to those peoples the idea that good must triumph in its eternal battle against evil, the conquistadors needed a substantial element: to forge the opposite of the Andean god, his adversary. Therefore, since there was no completely evil deity, the conquistadors distorted the figure of Supay (an ancient deity and/or supernatural entity linked to death and the depths) and relegated him to the role of the devil.

"That the God preached by the Spaniards and he (Pachacámac) were one and the same, as written by Pedro de Cieza de León in Demarcation of Peru, chapter seventy-two, and Reverend Father Fray Gerónimo Román, in The Republic of the West Indies, Book One, chapter five, says the same, both speaking of this same Pachacámac, although, not knowing the true meaning of the word, they attributed it to the devil. In saying that the God of the Christians and Pachacámac were one and the same, he spoke the truth, because the intention of those Indians was to give this name to the supreme God, who gives life and being to the universe, as the name itself signifies. And in saying that he was Pachacámac, he lied, because the Indians never intended to give this name to the devil, whom they called only Zúpay, which means devil, and to name him they first spat as a sign of curse and abomination, and they named Pachacámac with the worship and demonstrations we have mentioned. However, as this enemy had so much power among those infidels, he made himself God, entering into everything that the Indians venerated and regarded as sacred. He spoke in their oracles and temples and in the corners of their houses and elsewhere, telling them that he was Pachacámac and that he was all the other things to which the Indians attributed divinity, and because of this deception, they worshipped those things in which the devil spoke to them, thinking that it was the deity they imagined. If they had understood that it was the devil, they would have burned them, as they do now, by the mercy of the Lord, who wanted to communicate this to them."

(«Que el Dios que los españoles predicaban y él (Pachacámac) era todo uno, como lo escribe Pedro de Cieza de León en la Demarcación del Perú, capítulo setenta y dos, y el reverendo Padre Fray Gerónimo Román, en la República de las Indias Occidentales, Libro primero, capítulo quinto, dice lo mismo, hablando ambos de este mismo Pachacámac, aunque por no saber la propia significación del vocablo se lo atribuyeron al demonio. El cual, en decir que el Dios de los cristianos y el Pachacámac era todo uno, dijo verdad, porque la intención de aquellos indios fue dar este nombre al sumo Dios, que da vida y ser al universo, como lo significa el mismo nombre. Y en decir que él era el Pachacámac mintió, porque la intención de los indios nunca fue dar este nombre al demonio, que no le llamaron sino Zúpay, que quiere decir diablo, y para nombrarle escupían primero en señal de maldición y abominación, y al Pachacámac nombraban con la adoración y demostraciones que hemos dicho. Empero, como este enemigo tenía tanto poder entre aquellos infieles, hacíase Dios, entrándose en todo aquello que los indios veneraban y acataban por cosa sagrada. Hablaba en sus oráculos y templos y en los rincones de sus casas y en otras partes, diciéndoles que era el Pachacámac y que era todas las demás cosas a que los indios atribuían deidad, y por este engaño adoraban aquellas cosas en que el demonio les hablaba, pensando que era la deidad que ellos imaginaban, que si entendieran que era el demonio las quemaran entonces como ahora lo hacen por la misericordia del Señor, que quiso comunicárseles.»)

Comentarios Reales de los Incas, Capítulo II

=== Representation ===
Pachacamac was represented by the Pachacamac idol, a two-faced wooden idol that embodies the concept of duality. This concept is quite common within the worldview of the inhabitants of ancient Peru.

However, this wooden idol was merely a replica of the true idol, which was destroyed by the Spanish. Consequently, no information about it is available.

== Mythology ==
The god Pachacámac has been shrouded in various myths, which vary greatly from one another.

=== Pachacamac and Kon ===
In this myth, the god Kon is mentioned as the creator of everything; he was the creator of the Sun, the Moon, the stars, etc. (some variants show Kon as the son of the Sun and the Moon).

Once the Earth and all its elements had been created, Kon decided to populate it with beings who would worship and revere him. Thus, Kon created humanity and gave them fertile lands full of food and water. However, human beings gradually lost their devotion to their creator and, as a result, no longer made offerings to him. The god Kon punished them with the absence of rain, which turned the Edenic and fertile lands into the vast deserts that lie in the coastal area. As a show of mercy, the god Kon limited himself to providing humanity with a few rivers so that, with great effort, they could supply themselves and survive.

However, one day, the world witnessed the advent of the god Pachacámac, who arrived to impose a new order on creation. The latter confronted Kon in a long and violent battle that shook the entire Earth. The battle ended with the victory of the god Pachacámac and the exile of the god Kon. Subsequently, Pachacámac destroyed all of Kon's creation and molded it to his will. Likewise, Pachacámac turned the human beings of the god Kon into various animals such as monkeys, foxes, lizards, etc. He did this in order to create a new generation of human beings.

=== The myth of Vichama ===
According to this myth, Pachacámac is established as the son of the first Sun that illuminated the world.

Pachacámac had created a couple to populate the Earth, but he did not provide them with food. As a result, the man died shortly thereafter.

The grieving woman went to complain to the Sun (the creator of everything), who took pity on her and descended to Earth. With his powerful rays, the Sun impregnated the woman, and she gave birth to a beautiful child four days later (some versions call this child Mallko/Malqo).

The arrival of the child brought complete prosperity and joy to the woman.

The woman had regained the feeling that had deteriorated so much after witnessing the death of her partner and living in poor conditions: hope.

However, the woman's happiness was short-lived, as the story takes a grim turn after Pachacámac, her creator, immediately learned of the news.

In Pachacámac's opinion, the woman had committed a very serious transgression, as she had gone to the Sun instead of to him, her creator. Incited by the fury resulting from this transgression, Pachacámac snatched the child from his mother's arms. Ignoring her pleas, Pachacámac killed and dismembered the body of his half-brother. Once the fratricide was complete, Pachacámac sowed the child's body parts, and thus all foods were born. To name a few of these are: corn, cassava, potatoes, sweet potatoes, pacae, etc.

The foods did not fill the void left by the grieving woman. Every food she saw reminded her of her deceased son, so she began to cry inconsolably. The Sun intervened again and, with the remains of the child's navel, resurrected him. When the child was resurrected, he was named Vichama.

The woman raised the child with all the love a mother could offer. The infant god grew quickly into a handsome and gallant young man. At that moment, Vichama asked his mother's permission and set off on his adventure to travel the world like his father, the Sun.

During Vichama's absence, Pachacámac reappeared and killed the mother. The god divided the mother's body into small pieces and fed them to the condors and vultures. He kept the hair and bones, hiding them on the shores of the sea. Later, the god Pachacámac created a new generation of human beings.

Upon his return, Vichama learned the terrible news, and his inexorable fury was expressed through his eyes and heart, which emitted bright bursts of fiery fire.

Vichama immediately resurrected his mother and, enraged by such barbarity, sought out Pachacámac to confront him. In his relentless search, Vichama was unable to locate Pachacámac, who had fled by diving into the sea.

Realizing Pachacámac's disappearance, the enraged Vichama roared, setting the air ablaze and flashing lightning that terrified the fields.

Unable to mitigate his fury, Vichama accused the human beings created by Pachacámac of being accomplices in the killing of his mother. As punishment, Vichama turned humanity into stone. Vichama also decreed that the petrified curacas were to be worshipped as gods, while the commoners of the curacas were turned into ordinary stones.

Subsequently, a new humanity was created from three eggs that fell from the sky: one of gold, from which the curacas emerged; one of silver, from which their wives emerged; and another of copper, from which the men and women who populated the world emerged.

=== Wakon and the Willkas ===
In ancient times, at the top of Hanan Pacha, there lived two brothers: Pachacámac (god of the sky) and Wakon (god of fire and darkness).

Both brothers were captivated by a young woman of captivating beauty, who was the goddess Pachamama. As a result, the two brothers developed a strong rivalry.

Motivated by her beauty and simplicity, the god Pachacámac did not hesitate to win the heart of that goddess. When the goddess accepted him, Pachacámac and Pachamama united; in this way, both gods personified the union of heaven and earth.

As a result of this union, twins known as the “Willkas” were born. Both siblings were male and female.

This news unleashed the fury of Wakon, who was determined to confront his brother Pachacámac. However, the latter would end up defeating Wakon and, therefore, exiling his envious brother from Hanan Pacha to Kay Pacha.

Once on Earth, Wakon, filled with rage, unleashed his fury upon it. Droughts, floods, famine, and death were some of the ravages that Wakon unleashed on the world.

Affected by Wakon's devastating impact, Pachacámac descended from Hanan Pacha and began the second confrontation with his brother. With each blow, the Earth shook catastrophically. Wakon confronted his brother, this time with the full intention of killing him. However, Wakon would be defeated again by Pachacámac, thus restoring order to the world.

Then, as mortal beings, Pachacámac and Pachamama reigned on Earth alongside their two children, while the defeated Wakon was once again exiled and condemned to live in the shadows of the caves of the most distant mountains, with the warning never to return.

That happiness was short-lived, as Pachacámac accidentally fell into the sea at Lurín and drowned. Upon his death, Pachacámac turned into an island.

Pachacámac, who was the flame that gave light to the world, was extinguished. After this, the world was plunged into darkness.

After that, various events took place which, unbeknownst to them, led Pachamama and her children to an unrecognizable Wakon. Inside the cave where Wakon lived, called Wakonpahuacin, Pachamama and her children took shelter by the fire.

Realizing who they were, Wakon devised a plan to satisfy his desire for revenge.

Seeing that there was no water, Wakon sent the Willkas to fill a jug that had an almost indiscernible crack, so that it would take them a long time to realize that the jug could never be filled.

While the children were away, Wakon tried to seduce Pachamama and, when he failed, he killed the goddess and divided her body into pieces to devour her. After such barbarity, Pachamama transformed into the current Cordillera La Viuda mountain range.

Upon their return, the children asked about their mother in surprise, and Wakon told them that she would return soon. However, time passed and the mother goddess did not appear. Seeing the children's suffering, the animals took pity on them and decided to take action. They warned the children of the danger posed by this mysterious person, for he was their evil uncle, the god Wakon. The animals also helped the children defeat the fearsome god by tricking him into falling into a deep abyss. When this happened, violent earthquakes shook the entire Earth.

The children were grateful to the animals and continued on their journey. While the two siblings were picking potatoes, they found a goose plant shaped like a doll. The children, happy with their discovery, began to play with it until it broke into pieces.

The loss of their toy made the children cry until they fell asleep. While they slept, the girl had a dream that she did not understand. In her dream, she threw her hat into the air, but it did not come back down; instead, it remained suspended in the air.

When she woke up, the girl told her brother about the dream she had had, but neither of them understood its meaning. Confused and not knowing what to do, they sat in the field. As the children continued to wonder about the meaning, they saw two golden ropes hanging down from the sky. Astonished, they consulted with each other and decided to climb the ropes to see where they would lead them.

They climbed and climbed until they reached Hanan Pacha, where they were welcomed by their loving father. Pachacámac rewarded his children's bravery by granting them a privileged place in his kingdom. This is how the Willkas were transformed into celestial bodies: the boy became Inti, the Sun, and the girl became Quilla, the Moon.

Thus, the era of total darkness on Earth came to an end, giving way to day and night.

Pachamama is resurrected and rewarded for her loyalty to Pachacamac, who grants her the power of creation; From then on, Pachamama remained enchanted in the Cordillera La Viuda mountain range. This mountain range possesses perpetual snow with the power of creation, the source of rain and the provider of water for the sustenance of humans, plants, and animals.

The almighty Pachacámac also bestowed great gifts upon the animals that helped his children defeat the abominable Wakon.

=== Pachacamac and Ninamasha ===
This myth was collected in the Cañaris region of Lambayeque. It describes a world ruled by a deity named Ninamasha (his name comes from the Quechua words Nina, meaning fire, and Masha, which in the Quechua dialect of Ferreñafe means son-in-law). Due to his lust and other transgressions, Ninamasha is confronted and defeated by the cunning Pachacámac. Like many Andean myths, this one exemplifies a theme that has been studied extensively by Andean cultures: duality. The latter is reflected in two opposing cosmic forces that both divinities embody: Ninamasha (fire) and Pachacámac (water).

The myth begins with the following:

In ancient times, men were unable to clear their fields and make them suitable for planting. These were times when men did not know how to create fire.

They cried out for the divine favor of Ninamasha, a powerful deity of fiery nature and enormous strength. They begged Ninamasha to clear the fields. The deity did not perform these actions without something in return, for as payment he initially demanded a large amount of chicha to refresh himself.

Once the deal was made, Ninamasha appeared at the appointed place on the appointed date. Then he did the following: Ninamasha began to gradually turn red until he became a man of fire. Imbued with bright and voracious flames, Ninamasha ran through the field and set fire to everything in his path. Once his work was done, the deity could be seen at the opposite end of the farm. There, Ninamasha rested and gradually regained his normal appearance. This was the moment when Ninamasha drank chicha from a container called a poto, which had been placed there by the farm owner as a token of gratitude.

The burning of stubble and dry vegetation was generated and controlled at Ninamasha's will. He advanced and stopped his scorching run right at the edge of the field that needed to be burned. As a gesture of gratitude and retribution, he was paid with large quantities of chicha.

Before long, Ninamasha grew tired of the chicha offered as payment and began to focus his attention on the mamitas (women). This is when Ninamasha revealed his Machiavellian and womanizing side, as he now demanded mamitas as retribution (some scholars liken this behavior to other fiery gods such as Huallallo Carhuincho or Wakon). The people's complaints were immediate; however, there was no alternative, as they needed him for the grazing. Thus, the protest and discontent grew.

The moment came when the people witnessed the arrival of the god Pachacámac at the scene. Listening to the complaints and pleas of the villagers, Pachacámac promised to provide a solution to the problem.

To avoid a battle that could bring chaos and destruction to the world, Pachacámac knew Ninamasha's weakness: women.

One day, the god Pachacámac transformed himself into a woman of unparalleled beauty and, in this form, presented himself to the impulsive Ninamasha. As expected, Ninamasha succumbed instantly upon seeing the beautiful woman, and she proposed a romantic rendezvous in a place next to a deep ravine. When the two met at the agreed time, the supposed mamita decided it was the perfect moment to carry out her plan. Seizing the moment, the cunning mamita tricked the obsessed Ninamasha to the edge of the Suyama precipice and, in a moment of carelessness, the woman managed to push Ninamasha over the edge.

Using his divine powers, Pachacámac diverted the course of the Paltic stream so that water would fall incessantly from the top of the ravine onto the place where Ninamasha's body lay. Ninamasha did not die, but was neutralized by the endless fall of cold water on his body, which made it impossible for him to get up, and he remains there to this day.

Having fulfilled his promise, Pachacámac disappeared, and his feat brought joy to the inhabitants, who, thanks to Pachacámac, were able to free themselves from Ninamasha's yoke. As mentioned above, Ninamasha never dies, but his body is cooled by the enormous amount of water falling from the top of the ravine. If the water were to dry up, Ninamasha could wake up again.

=== Temenduare and Arikute ===
This myth tells of two brother gods whose confrontations caused the destruction of the world. Pachacámac intervened to restore order, punishing the two gods by stripping them of their powers.

As an archaic god, Temenduare was lord of the day, while Arikute was lord of the night, and each day they fought twice: once at dawn and once at dusk. At dawn, Temenduare killed Arikute; at dusk, Arikute revived and killed Temenduare, in an eternal and cyclical battle that lengthened the days and nights depending on the seasons, with neither of them completely defeating the other despite the terrible and continuous nature of their confrontation.

Regardless of the versions, a day came when the enraged Temenduare kicked the Earth with such force that the waters of the earth and the heavens spilled out with such profusion and violence that everything was destroyed by the flood.

Temenduare ran to the top of the mountains, followed by Arikute, both saving themselves from succumbing to the raging waters.

The battle between the two brothers did not cease at the top of the mountains. Arikute, as furious as his brother Temenduare, ended up summoning the terrible beast from the depths: a gigantic, hundred-legged sea monster. This abominable beast was the last straw, as it ended up devouring everything in its path.

The great Viracocha, incarnated in Pachacámac, saved what he could, and when everything returned to calm, he recreated the world and human beings; then he banished his brothers from the heavenly chambers and degraded their powers. Temenduare and Arikute were relegated to becoming lesser gods of the seas and mountains. They also have the obligation to protect humans from floods and earthquakes.

Temenduare and Arikute obeyed reluctantly; however, from time to time they rebel against Pachacámac. This happens mainly when the people do not make the proper offerings to them, because then they feel forgotten and offended. In their discontent, both brothers cause tidal waves, earthquakes, storms, and floods that no longer destroy the world, because their power has been degraded, but which cause a great deal of damage.

=== Pachacamac according to the Huarochirí manuscript ===
The Huarochirí manuscript recounts events involving various gods and/or huacas. One of them is the god Pachacámac.

According to the manuscript, Pachacámac is the husband of a goddess known as Urpayhuáchac. This goddess is one of the Ñamca sisters, who were five sisters (including Urpayhuáchac), with Chaupiñamca being the eldest of them all.

Urpayhuáchac is mentioned as the goddess who created fish and birds.

Pachacámac is named in the chapter where the goddess Cahuillaca, upon discovering that Cuniraya Huiracocha was the father of her son, flees from him. Cahuillaca, full of disdain, is destined to head for the sea. Once there, the goddess, together with her son, throws herself into the waters of the sea, giving rise to the Pachacámac Islands.

The obsessed Cuniraya swam to the islands and arrived at a place where Pachacámac's daughters were being guarded by an Amaru.

Cuniraya wanted revenge on Pachacámac, as he believed that Pachacámac was responsible for separating him from his beloved Cahuillaca.

Shortly before, the goddess Urpayhuáchac had entered the sea to visit Cahuillaca.

Taking advantage of the mother's absence, Cuniraya raped the eldest daughter. When he tried to do the same to the younger daughter, she transformed herself into a dove and flew away. It is for this reason that the goddess was called Urpayhuáchac (she who gives birth to doves).

At that time, fish did not yet exist in the sea. Only the goddess Urpayhuáchac raised them in a small pond inside her home.

Upon learning that Urpayhuáchac had gone to visit Cahuillaca, Cuniraya, furious, threw all the fish into the sea. In this way, the fish began to multiply by the thousands. This is why the sea is full of fish.

When her daughters told her how Cuniraya had raped them, Urpayhuáchac, furious, pursued him.

Seeing that she could not catch up with Cuniraya, the goddess wanted to trick him and crush him with a huge rock that she herself made grow. However, the cunning Cuniraya escaped unscathed and managed to get away.

The manuscript also mentions other children of Pachacámac, such as Llocllayhuancupa, whose story is also told, and Auca Atama, whom the locals mention instead of Pachacámac's two daughters.

In another chapter, it is mentioned how Pachacámac and other gods and/or huacas were summoned by the Inca Tupac Yupanqui, as some communities had rebelled.

While the Inca spoke to the huacas, none of them answered. On the contrary, they all remained completely silent.

Then, the Inca threatened the huacas with ceasing to offer them riches and burning them, thus losing the services that the Inca offered to the gods.

At that, Pachacámac began to speak: "Oh Inca Sun, I propose nothing, since I usually make the whole Earth tremble with all of you together. In fact, I would not only annihilate the enemy, but I would also destroy all of you and the entire world. That is why I remain silent."

As everyone remained silent, Macahuisa, who was the son of the god Pariacaca, offered to assist the Inca.

=== Pachacamac and the Seven Brothers ===
Within the province of Tarma, in the town of San Pedro de Cajas, there are seven hills associated with the god Pachacámac.

It is said that Pachacámac was the creator of everything; he gave life and form to the world, populating it with plants and animals. However, seeing that humanity did not yet exist, Pachacámac summoned the Pleiades (Qollqa or Onqoy for the Incas) and ordered them to descend with their respective wives to populate the world.

These seven brothers settled in the territory of Tarma and divided up their respective territories: the youngest was assigned the high, cold, and inhospitable area for the production and variety of potatoes; the older brothers took over the prosperous irrigated basins of Acobamba, Vilcabamba, Huaracayo, Tapo, and La Unión for the domestication and abundance of the best fruits of the sacred corn of the gods. In honor of the myth, these are the towns and districts that produce the best varieties.

And as they lived happily and in abundance, they forgot their creator, who punished them with a flood that swept away everything in its path. The brothers took refuge in the home of their mistreated younger brother, but everything was destroyed and all the brothers became the “Seven Jirkas” to care for future generations, with authority and prestige on the border with the Antis of Chanchamayo.

These Jirkas are known by the following emblematic names: Rashta Waman, Poqoy Waman, Tamya Waman, Orqo Waman, Punku Waman, Rikra Waman, and Indio Waman.

=== Pachacamac and food ===
This myth explains the origin of a dance dedicated to the goddess Mama Rayguana. According to the myth, this dance began to be practiced when food returned after a long famine on Earth.

The myth is narrated below:

Long ago, a terrible famine struck the entire Earth. The reason for this terrible event was that humans had mistreated their food. They made it cry. Potatoes were burned in pots, exposed to ice to make chuño (freeze-dried potatoes), their eyes were poked out after peeling, or they were made to be pecked by birds; corn was roasted alive in "canalas" (griddles), and oca tubers were dried in the sun.

The poor food was thrown on the ground, left to rot, or boiled in large pots only to be discarded.

The potatoes, corn, oca tubers, olluco tubers, and others suffered from the constant mistreatment. Before disappearing, they warned the god Pachacamac (creator of the world). A severe frost scorched the grasses, a harsh wind stripped the trees of their leaves, and a widespread famine ravaged the villages. The sun withered the crops. The clouds and rains withered for years, the springs dried up, and the fields became barren. Animals and children wept from hunger, and hundreds of birds died of thirst. The people dug up the roots of the ayrampo, Rangoon creeper, and other herbs to stave off hunger.

One day, the animals gathered and agreed to appoint a commission of birds to go before the god Pachacamac and beg him for the return of food. The condor, followed by the eagle, the hummingbird, and others, formed a chain in the air. They all flew. The rest remained on Earth to prepare the ground. Upon arriving before Pachacamac, the birds told him: "We suffer from hunger because of humankind." The god Pachacamac, taking pity on the creatures, forgave the evildoers and returned the seeds to the delegation of birds. All the animals, dismayed, gazed at the sky. Suddenly, they saw in the distance the birds returning, each carrying a seed in its beak. The condor brought the potato, the hawk brought the corn, the hummingbird the quinoa, and so on, each according to its size and preference. The other animals, helpful and with great love, received the seeds as they fell one by one. They sowed them with immense joy and cultivated them with great care. They sang and danced when there was a harvest again, thanks to the fertility of Mama Rayguana (Mama Pacha) who makes the plants be born, grow, and ripen.

Since then, all the animals dance joyfully around Mama Rayguana, celebrating the transition from famine to abundance. That is why, even now, people from village to village perform the dance of Mama Rayguana. They offer prayers to the seeds of potatoes, corn, oca, and other Andean crops, invoking Mama Rayguana to ensure their bounty. Since then, people have cherished food and built collqas, pirhuas, and raised platforms to store their harvests and avoid hunger. From some villages, Mama Rayguana is leaving, taking the food with her, because they are forgetting to perform the dance. If people begin to mistreat potatoes, corn, oca, and other Andean foods again, famine will return as it did before.

=== The pitcher of primordial waters ===
This myth was compiled by the priest Pedro de la Gasca. As in other sources, it establishes the god Pachacamac as the creator of everything; however, this myth focuses on explaining the origin of the ocean's distribution across the Earth.

The myth begins as follows:

The people who inhabited the plains fervently worshipped the god Pachacamac, believing that he had created the sky, the earth, the sea, and all other things. However, it was believed that Pachacamac, upon creating the sea, contained it within a jar.

The responsibility of guarding this jar was assigned to a man and a woman; however, both were negligent in protecting it and broke it. In doing so, the primordial waters contained within the jar spilled across the entire Earth; thus, the waters were distributed as we know them today.

Upon learning of the situation, the god Pachacamac decreed that the waters should remain as they had been dispersed across the world. However, Pachacamac punished the man and woman's negligence by transforming them into animals: the man was transformed into a monkey, from whom all monkeys originated; and the woman was transformed into a fox, from whom all foxes originated.

== See also ==
- Inca mythology
- Pachacamac
