= List of coupled siblings =

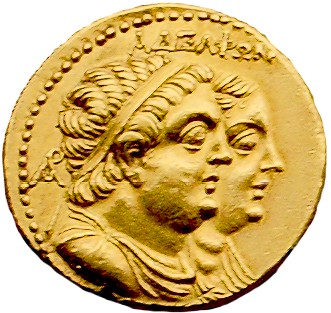
A coin depicting Ptolemy II Philadelphus and his sister-wife Arsinoe II.

This article lists well-known individuals who had sexual or marital ties with their sibling(s) at any point in history. It does not include coupled siblings in works of fiction, although those from mythology and religion are included.

== Terminology ==
There are many terms used to describe a romantic bond between siblings, including formal nomenclature such as adelphogamy, specific hyponyms such twincest, or slang terms like sibcest. In a heterosexual context, a female partner in such a relationship may be referred as a sister-wife. A similar incestuous arrangement which is non-monogamous can be referred as sister-swapping or brother-swapping, although this should not be confused with berdel, which describes the situation in which families exchange brides or bridegrooms.

== History ==
Earliest sibling marriages can be traced back to creation myths of early civilizations in Egypt and West Asia. Partly impacted by their creation myths, royal brother-sister marriages were historically practiced among royalty in Ancient Egypt, particularly the Eighteenth and Nineteenth Dynasties, and Ptolemaic Egypt. Sibling marriages were also found in the pre-Columbian Inca Empire of Peru, in pre-colonial Hawaiʻi, sporadically throughout Eurasia, particularly the Achaemenid Empire and the Hellenistic reigns, and in various other places.

While cousin marriage is legal in most countries today (less often with regard to first cousins), and avunculate marriage is legal in several, sexual relations between siblings are considered impermissibly incestuous almost universally. Sibling marriage is legally prohibited in most countries worldwide, with a partial exception being Sweden, where marriages between half-siblings are legally permitted.

Innate sexual aversion between siblings forms due to close association in childhood, in what is known as the Westermarck effect. Children who grow up together do not normally develop sexual attraction, even if they are unrelated, and conversely, siblings who were separated at a young age may develop sexual attraction. Thus, many cases of sibling incest, including accidental incest, concern siblings who were separated at birth or at a very young age.

== List of coupled siblings ==
=== Religion, mythology, and legend ===
- Nüwa and her full brother Fuxi, in Chinese mythology
- Mashya and Mashyana in Zoroastrian mythology
- King Arthur and his half-sister Morgause

==== In Egyptian mythology ====
- Nut and her full brother Geb
- Shu and his full sister Tefnut
- Osiris and his full sister Isis
- Set and his full sister Nephthys

==== In Abrahamic religions ====
- Abraham and his half-sister Sarah
- Luluwa and her full brother Abel.
- Awan and her full brother Cain
- Azura and her full brother Seth.

==== In Japanese mythology ====
- Kamiyo-nanayo
  - Uhijini and Suhijini
  - Tsunugui and Ikugui
  - Otonoji and Otonobe
  - Omodaru and Ayakashikone
  - Izanami and her twin brother Izanagi
- Amaterasu and her full brother Tsukuyomi

==== In Greek mythology ====
- Cronus and his full sister Rhea
- Phoebe and her full brother Coeus
- Hyperion and his full sister Theia
- Oceanus and his full sister Tethys
- Ceto and her full brother Phorcys
- Nyx and her full brother Erebus
- Zeus and his full sisters Hera and Demeter
- Demeter and her full brothers Zeus and Poseidon
- Aphrodite and her half-brothers Ares, Hephaestus, Hermes, and Dionysus
- Macareus (son of Aeolus) and his full sister Canace
- Heracles and his half-sister Hebe

=== Monarchs ===
==== In ancient Egypt ====
- Smenkhkare and his half-sister Meritaten
- Djet and his full sister Merneith
- Merneptah and his full sister Isetnofret II
- Menkaure and his full sister Khamerernebty II
- Seti II and his half-sister Twosret
- Ahmose I and his full sister Ahmose-Nefertari and his half-sister Ahmose-Henuttamehu
- Seqenenre Tao and his full sisters Ahhotep I and Sitdjehuti and his half-sister Ahmose Inhapy
- Amenhotep I and his full sister Ahmose-Meritamun
- Thutmose I and his half-sister Ahmose
- Thutmose II and his half-sister Hatshepsut
- Akhenaten and an unnamed sister
- Tutankhamun and his half-sister Ankhesenamun
- Djoser and his half-sister Hetephernebti
- Djedefre and his full sister Hetepheres II, who was previously married to her half-brother Kawab
- Pepi II Neferkare and his half-sisters Iput II and Ankhesenpepi III
- Intef III and his half-sister Iah
- Mentuhotep II and his full sister Neferu II
- Senusret I and his half-sister Neferu III
- Senusret II and his sisters Khenemetneferhedjet I, Nofret II, Itaweret, and Khenmet
- Nubkhaes and her half-brother Sobekemsaf
- Ramesses III and his half-sister Tyti
- Ramesses IV and his half-sister Duatentopet
- Psusennes I and his full sister Mutnedjmet
- Pinedjem II and his full sister Isetemkheb D
- Takelot II and his half-sister Karomama II
- Alara of Kush and his half-sister Kasaqa
- Kashta and his full sister Pebatjma
- Tantamani and his full sisters Piankharty and Setemkheb H
- Apries and his full sister Ankhnesneferibre
- Piye and his half-sisters Peksater and Khensa
- Shebitku and his half-sister Arty

==== In other Near Eastern royal houses ====
- Amoashtart and her brother Tabnit
- Artemisia II of Caria and her full brother Mausolus
- Ada of Caria and her full brother Idrieus
- Arsinoe II and her full brother Ptolemy II Philadelphus and half-brother Ptolemy Ceraunus
- Erato of Armenia and her half-brother Tigranes IV
- Boran and her full brother Kavad II
- Darius II and his half-sister, Parysatis
- Artaxerxes II and his full sister Amestris
- Cambyses II and two of his sisters, Atossa and Roxanne
- Mithridates IV of Pontus and his full sister Laodice
- Mithridates VI Eupator and his full sister Laodice
- Antiochus III of Commagene and his full sister Iotapa
- Antiochus IV of Commagene and his full sister Iotapa
- Ptolemy IV Philopator and his full sister Arsinoe III of Egypt
- Cleopatra II and her full brothers Ptolemy VI Philometor and Ptolemy VIII Physcon
- Ptolemy IX Soter and his full sisters Cleopatra IV and Cleopatra Selene, who later married her other full brother Ptolemy X Alexander I.
- Ptolemy XI Alexander II and his possible half-sister Berenice III
- Ptolemy XII Auletes and his full sister Cleopatra V
- Cleopatra VII and her full brothers Ptolemy XIII Theos Philopator and Ptolemy XIV Philopator
- Laodice IV and her full brothers Antiochus, Seleucus IV Philopator, and Antiochus IV Epiphanes
- Alexander II of Epirus and his half-sister Olympias II of Epirus

==== In Inca Peru ====
- Manco Cápac and his full sister Mama Ocllo
- Sinchi Roca and his half-sister Mama Cura
- Topa Inca Yupanqui and his full sister Mama Ocllo Coya
- Sayri Túpac and his full sister Cusi Huarcay
- Cura Ocllo and her full brother Manco Inca Yupanqui
- Huayna Capac and his full sisters Kuya Kusi Rimay and Kuya Rahua Ocllo
- Huáscar and his full sister Chuqui Huipa
- Atahualpa and his half-sister Coya Asarpay

==== In Japan ====
- Emperor Nintoku and his 2 half-sisters Princess Yata and Uji no Wakiiratsume
- Prince Kinashi no Karu and his full sister Princess Karu no Ōiratsume (5th century)
- Emperor Bidatsu and his half-sister Empress Suiko (6th century)
- Emperor Yōmei and his half-sister Anahobe no Hashihito (6th century)
- Emperor Kanmu and his half-sister Princess Sakahito (8th century)
- Emperor Heizei and 3 half-sisters Princess Asahara, Princess Ōyake, and Princess Kan'nabi
- Emperor Junna and his half-sister Princess Koshi (9th century)
- Emperor Saga and his half-sister Princess Takatsu
- Emperor Seiwa and his half-sister Minamoto no Seishi
- Emperor Kōkaku and his adopted sister/cousin Princess Yoshiko

==== In Korea ====
- Jeongjong of Goryeo (today Korea) and his half-sister (10th century)
- Gwangjong of Goryeo and his half-sister Daemok (10th century)
- Deokjong of Goryeo and his half-sisters Gyeongseong and Hyosa (11th century)
- Munjong of Goryeo and his half-sister Inpyeong (11th century)

==== In Burma (Myanmar) ====
- Nyaungyan Min of Burma (today Myanmar) and his half-sister Khin Hpone Myint (16th century)
- Kyawswa of Pagan (Burma) and his half-sister Mi Saw U
- Uzana I of Pinya (Burma) and his half-sister Atula Maha Dhamma Dewi of Pinya
- Binnya E Law of Martaban (Burma) and his half-sister Sanda Min Hla
- Anaukpetlun of Burma and his 3 half-sisters
- Mindon Min of Burma and his half-sister Setkya Dewi
- Thibaw Min of Burma and his half-sisters Supayagyi, Supayalat, and Supayalay
- Prince Myo Tu, Prince of Mekkhaya (Burma) and his half-sister Pin

==== In other Southeast Asian countries ====
- Rama II of Siam (today Thailand) and his half-sister Kunthon Thipphayawadi (19th century)
- Chulalongkorn of Siam (today Thailand) and his half-sisters Sunandha Kumariratana, Savang Vadhana, Saovabha Phongsri, Sukhumala Marasri, Daksinajar (19th century)
- Sisavang Vong of Laos and his half-sisters Khamphane and Khamtouan (20th century)
- Norodom Sutharot and his half-sister Norodom Phangangam, parents of Norodom Suramarit

==== In the Hawaiian Islands ====
- Kaumualiʻi and his half-sister Kaʻapuwai Kapuaʻamohu
- Keliimaikai and his half-sister Kiʻilaweau
- Keōua and his half-sister Manono I
- Kalola Pupuka and her full brother Kamehamehanui Aiʻluau
- Lanakawai and his half-sister Kalohialiʻiokawai
- Laʻau and his full sister Kukamolimaulialoha
- Pilikaʻaiea and his full sister Hina-au-kekele
- Hinaʻauamai and her full brother Koa
- Kukohou and his half-sister Hineuki
- Kahaimoelea and his half-sister Kapoʻakaʻuluhailaʻa
- Kalaunuiohua and his half-sister Kaheka
- Kahoukapu and his full sister Hukulani
- Keaweʻōpala and his half-sister Hākau
- Kauakahiakua and his full sister Kāneikapōleikauila
- Kalaninuiamamao and his half-sister Kekaulike-i-Kawekiuonalani
- Keaweʻīkekahialiʻiokamoku and his half-sister Kalanikauleleiaiwi
- Kekuʻiapoiwa I and her half-brother Kekaulike
- Umi-a-Liloa and his half-sister Aliʻi Kapukini-a-Liloa
- Kukailani and his half-sister Kaohukiokalani
- Keākealanikāne and his half-sisters, Aliʻi Kealiʻiokalani and Kealiʻiokalani
- Keākealaniwahine and her half-brother Chief Kane-i-Kauaiwilani
- Haae-a-Mahi and his half-sister Kekelakekeokalani
- Keawepoepoe and his full sister Kanoena
- Kīwalaʻō and his half-sister Kekuiapoiwa Liliha
- Kamehameha II and his half-sisters Kamāmalu, Kīnaʻu, and Kekāuluohi
- Kamehameha III and his full sister Nāhiʻenaʻena

==== In medieval and early modern Europe ====
- John V of Armagnac and his full sister Isabelle of Armagnac (15th century)
- Brothers Philip, Thomas, and William Howard married their step-sisters, Anne, Mary, and Elizabeth Dacre respectively.
- Julien and Marguerite de Ravalet, full siblings (16th century)

=== Non-royalty/commoner sibling couples ===
- Patrick Stübing and his full sister Susan Karolewski
- George of Izla and his sister Maria

=== Suspected/disputed sibling couples ===
- Demetrius I Soter and his full sister Laodice V
- Caligula and his full sisters Julia Livilla, Drusilla, and Agrippina the Younger
- Herod Agrippa II and his full sister Berenice
- Cesare Borgia and his full sister Lucrezia
- Lord Byron and his half-sister Augusta Leigh

== See also ==
- Sibling relationship § Sibling marriage and incest
- Consanguinity
  - Consanguine marriage
- Avunculate marriage
- Cousin marriage
  - List of coupled cousins
- Inbreeding
  - Laws regarding incest

== Bibliography ==
- Bunson, Margaret R., ed. (2012). Encyclopedia of Ancient Egypt (3rd ed.). New York: Infobase Pub. ISBN 978-1-4381-3859-6. OCLC 782879915.
- Dodson, Aidan (2000). Monarchs of the Nile (2nd ed.). American University in Cairo Press. ISBN 978-0-9652457-8-4 – via Internet Archive.
- Dodson, Aidan; Hilton, Dyan (2004). The Complete Royal Families of Ancient Egypt. London: Thames & Hudson. ISBN 0-500-05128-3. OCLC 59265536.
- Fornander, Abraham (1878). An Account of the Polynesian Race: Its Origin and Migrations and the Ancient History of the Hawaiian People to the Times of Kamehameha I. Vol. 1. London: Trübner & Company.
- Fornander, Abraham (1880). An Account of the Polynesian Race: Its Origin and Migrations and the Ancient History of the Hawaiian People to the Times of Kamehameha I. Vol. 2. London: Trübner & Company.
- Grant, Michael; Hazel, John (2002). Who's Who in Classical Mythology (3rd ed.). Routledge. ISBN 9780415260411 – via Credo Reference.
- Haley, James L. (2014). Captive Paradise: A History of Hawaii. Macmillan. ISBN 978-0-312-60065-5.
- Leeming, David, ed. (2006) [2005]. The Oxford Companion to World Mythology. doi:10.1093/acref/9780195156690.001.0001. ISBN 9780199916481.
- Lloyd, Alan B., ed. (2010). A Companion to Ancient Egypt. Vol. 1 & 2. Chichester: Wiley-Blackwell. ISBN 978-1-4443-2006-0.
- Niles, Susan (1 May 1999). The Shape of Inca History: Narrative and Architecture in an Andean Empire. University of Iowa Press. ISBN 9781587292941.
- Redford, Donald B., ed. (2005) [2001]. The Oxford Encyclopedia of Ancient Egypt. doi:10.1093/acref/9780195102345.001.0001. ISBN 978-0-19-518765-6. OCLC 967267800.
- Santiago, Luciano P. R. (1973). The children of Oedipus; brother-sister incest in psychiatry, literature, history, and mythology. Roslyn Heights, N.Y.: Libra Publishers. ISBN 9780872120280. LCCN 73-79773. OCLC 00737272.
- Tyldesley, Joyce A. (2006). Chronicle of the Queens of Egypt: From Early Dynastic Times to the Death of Cleopatra. New York: Thames & Hudson. ISBN 978-0-500-05145-0. OCLC 70059770.
