= Cuxirimay Ocllo =

Princess and queen consort of the Inca Empire

Cuxirimay Ocllo (Classical Quechua: Kuši Rimay Uqllu) (born before 1532–d. after 1576), also known as Doña Angelina Yupanqui, was a princess and consort of the Inca Empire by marriage to her cousin, the Sapa Inca Atahualpa (r. 1532–1533).

She played a discreet but important political role in the environment of the Spanish conquest of the Inca Empire, first as wife of Atahualpa and later by becoming a concubine to Francisco Pizarro. Historian Néstor Taboada describes her as "mysterious, seductive, impudent, deceptive, tough and independent" and compared her role to that of La Malinche during the conquest of the Aztec Empire.

== Biography ==
She was born to Yamque Yupangue and Paccha Duchicela. She was selected by her uncle Huayna Capac to become one of the consorts of his son, prince Atahualpa, because she was Atahualpa's cousin. She was not the only consort of Atahualpa, who was also married to Coya Asarpay, who became his sister-queen. Cuxirimay Ocllo was not queen but had the title of ñusta or secondary consort.

Her spouse became Inca in 1532. In 1533, Atahualpa was deposed and executed by the Spaniards. He was succeeded by Manco Inca Yupanqui, who was basically a prisoner of the Spaniards. During this time period, the Spaniards abducted and raped many women in Cuzco, including princesses, noblewomen, priestesses, and the aclla, many of which they kept as concubines and later baptized and married. According to Fernández de Oviedo, Hernando Pizarro, Juan Pizarro and Gonzalo Pizarro "left no one single women or sister of his [Manco's] unviolated", and had taken the Inca princesses as concubines. The abduction and rape of queen Cura Ocllo (the wife and full sister of the Inca emperor Manco Inca Yupanqui) also happened during this period.

Cuxirimay Ocllo herself was made the concubine of Francisco Pizarro. She was converted to Catholicism, baptized and given the name Angelina Yupanqui. She lived with Pizarro in Lima between 1538 and 1541. She had two sons with Pizarro, Francisco Pizarro (b. 1539) and Juan Pizarro (b. 1540). After the death of Francisco Pizarro, she married Juan de Betanzos. Her last marriage is described as a happy one, and the couple lived together in Cuzco. Juan de Betanzos learned Quechua, and wrote the Narrative of the Incas with her as a source. She is last noted to be alive in 1576.

== Issue ==
She had six children with Atahualpa:

- Francisco Tupac Atauchi
- María Isabella Atabalipa Yupanqui
- Felipe Atabalipa Yupanqui
- Isabel Atahuallpa
- Maria Yupanqui
- Puca Cisa

Two with Pizarro:

- Francisco Pizarro Yupanqui
- Juan Pizarro Yupanqui

And one daughter with Juan de Betanzos:

- María de Betanzos Yupanqui
