= Cusi Huarcay =

Princess and queen consort of the Inca Empire

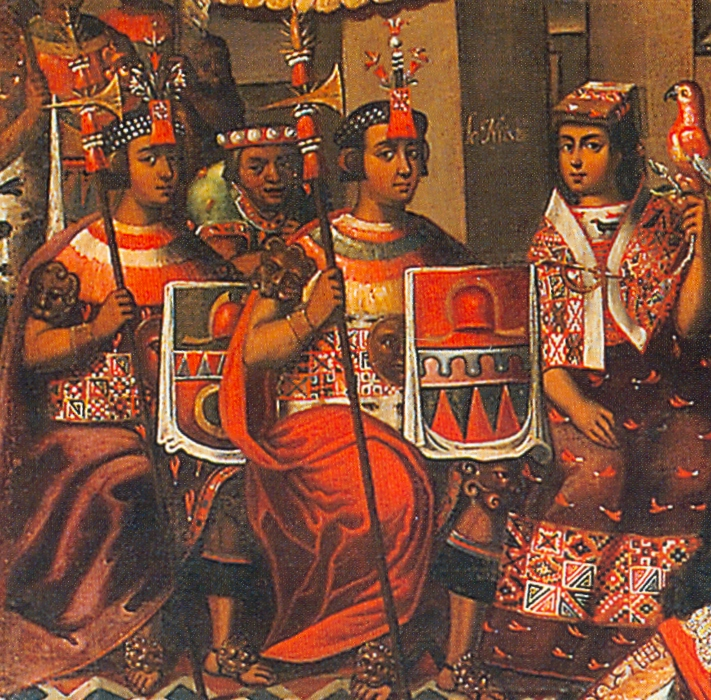
- Cusi Huarcay
- Born: 1531
- Died: 1586 (aged 54–55)
- Spouse: Sayri Túpac
- Issue: Beatriz Clara Coya
- Father: Manco Inca Yupanqui
- Mother: Cura Ocllo

Cusi Huarcay (1531 – 1586) was a ñusta and queen consort of the Inca Empire by marriage to her brother, the Sapa Inca Sayri Túpac (r 1545-1561). She was born to Manco Inca Yupanqui and Cura Ocllo. She was the mother of Beatriz Clara Coya (1556-1600).

She is first mentioned when she accompanied her husband-brother Sayri Túpac from Vilcabamba to Spanish controlled territory in 1556. Garcilaso de la Vega described her as extremely beautiful. Like her brother, she converted to Catholicism with Alonso de Hinojos as her godfather. After having been given a dispensation from the Pope, and then married her brother a second time, in a Catholic wedding ceremony in the cathedral in Cuzco by the Bishop of Cuzco, Juan Solano, in 1558. The couple settled in Yucay.

When she was widowed in 1561, the fortune of her late spouse was inherited by their daughter. Spaniards was appointed to manage the fortune to the daughter, who was placed to be raised in a convent, while the widow was left without means, despite the fact that Sayri Túpac had left her an allowance from his daughter's fortune. Cusi Huarcay was forced to instigate a legal court process to get her allowance. She fulfilled her informal role to receive subjects from Vilcabamba, and described as frugal but in debt.

In 1564, Cusi Huarcay was housed by Arias Maldonado, and was able to have her daughter Beatriz released from the convent. She had her daughter engaged to Cristóbal Maldonado, a relative of Arias Maldonado. This caused governor Lope García de Castro to have Maldonados exiled to Spain, and Beatriz returned to the convent. Cusi Huarcay remarried the soldier Juan Fernández Coronel. She requested to be allowed to return to Vilcabamba, and promised to reveal the location of silver and gold mines in exchange, but was never given permission to return.

Preceded by Cura Ocllo	Coya; Queen consort of the Inca Empire; 1545 - 1561	Succeeded by None
