= Chuqui Huipa =

The Coya Chuqui Huipa (floruit 1532) was a princess and queen consort, Coya, of the Inca Empire by marriage to her brother, the Sapa Inca Huáscar (r. 1527–1532).

== Early life ==
Chuqui Huipa was the daughter of the Inca Huayna Capac and Rahua Ocllo, and thus the full sister of Huáscar. At the time of her father's death in 1527, she, her mother, and her father's entire harem were in Quito with him. Her father had willed his throne to his illegitimate son, her half brother Atahualpa, but her legitimate full brother Huáscar had the will overturned, executed his fathers’ executors, and claimed the throne for himself. He then ordered his mother, sister, and the rest of the harem to be brought to Cuzco, as he wished to follow the ancient custom of marrying his sister to further ensure his own blood line would be completely legitimate.

== Marriage ==
The wedding was performed with some difficulty. Her mother had initially refused to give her consent to it, which was crucial for it to take place. Her reason is reported to have been personal discontent with Huáscar, and disapproval of his execution of her late husband's executors. She is reported to have favored the illegitimate son of her spouse, Atahualpa, who had been brought up in her household, before Huáscar. As the wedding was important for the succession to continue undisturbed, this presented a problem for Huáscar. Her mother was finally forced to consent, and the wedding and coronation could take place.

== Queen ==
The relationship between queen Chuqui Huipa and Huáscar was reportedly not a happy one. Huáscar viewed his brother Atahualpa as a threat and had many people at court executed because he believed their loyalty to be faltering. Atahualpa, who resided in a different part of the realm, had been absent from the coronation of Huáscar. He did, however, send his loyalists and spokespersons with gifts and greetings to the queen and her mother in Cuzco, who received them kindly. This exposed them both to suspicions from Huáscar, who assumed them to belong to the opposition and of taking sides with Atahualpa against him. As soon as the visitors left, Huáscar caused a scene by entering the queen's audience chamber and accusing the queen's mother of being the prime adviser of Atahualpa, and them both of disloyalty. Both the queen and her mother denied the accusations, and Huáscar was not able to prove anything against them. He did, however, have them placed under guard and placed spies around them to report their every act.

The queen reacted very poorly to being placed under such circumstances. Reportedly, she took such offence at being put under watch, that she refrained from eating during day time and only took one meal during the night to ensure the spies would have nothing to report, not even such innocent activities such as eating. Her new conditions also caused a depression, and she reportedly took to abusing coca, both to sleep at night but also during day time. The bad relationship between the royal couple attracted public attention and bad publicity. When Huáscar had several members of the embassy Atahualpa had sent to him in Quito executed, the remaining member of his embassy, Quilaco, appealed to the queen and her mother for help. When the civil war erupted between the two brothers, the situation for the queen and her mother became even more difficult. When Atahualpa escaped from his brothers custody, they were both, reportedly, very close to being arrested and executed.

In 1532, Huáscar was defeated and taken prisoner by the army of Atahualpa, who paraded him in public as a prisoner to the capital of Cuzco after the Battle of Quipaipan. Upon entering the city, the loyalists of Atahualpa reportedly called Rahua Ocllo a concubine rather than a queen in order to present Huáscar as illegitimate. Despite this, Rahua Ocllo approached her captive and deposed son by reproaching him in public. She explained that though he was her son, he deserved his present predicament because of his execution of Atahualpa's ambassadors, for all his misdeeds, and for having dragged down his entire family, including her, in his ruin without cause, and slapped him in public.

Preceded by Rahua Ocllo	Coya; Queen consort of the Inca Empire; 1527 - 1532	Succeeded by Coya Asarpay
