= Cura Ocllo =

Incan noble (d. 1539)

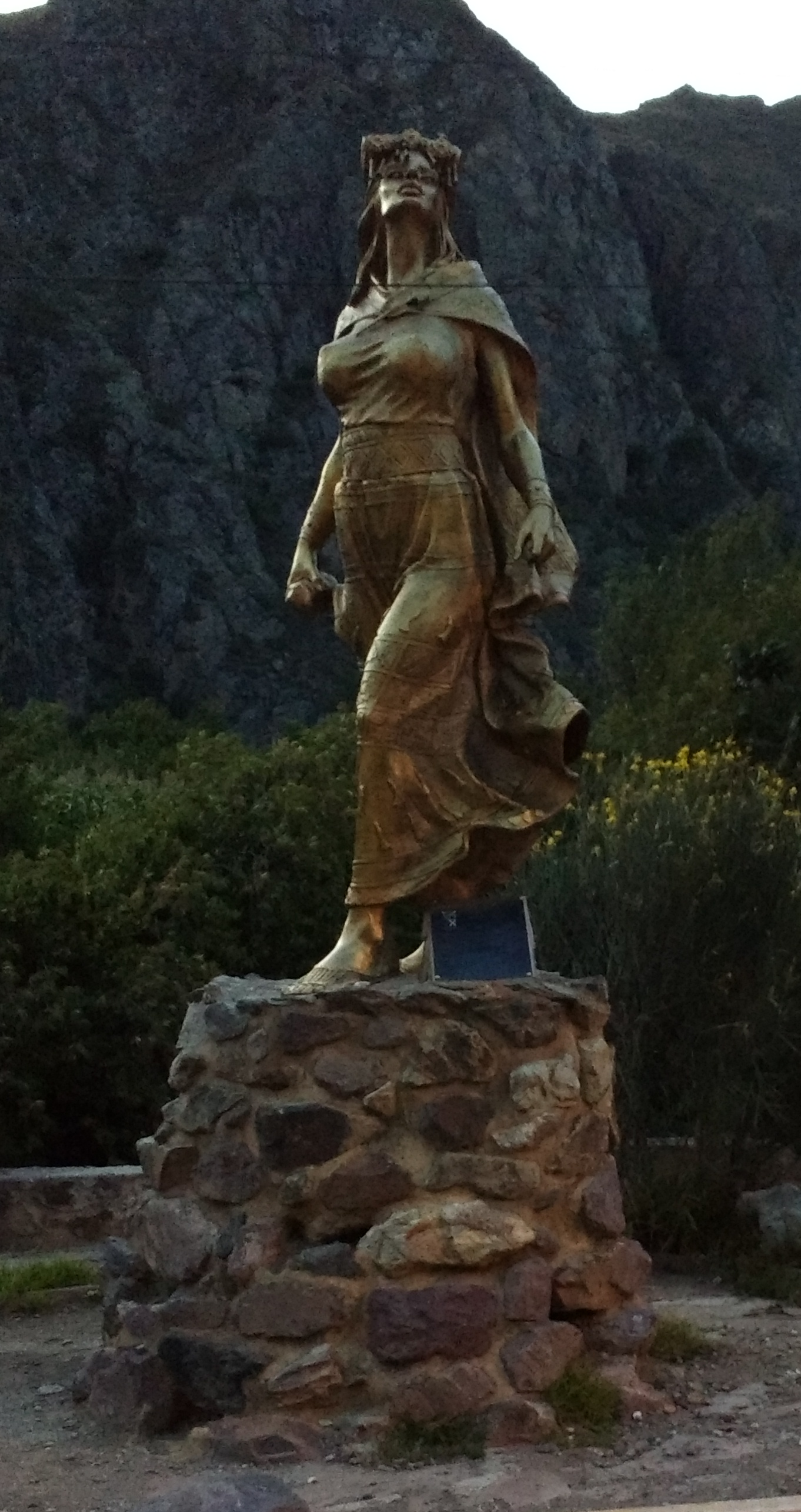
Statue of Ocllo in Ollantaytambo, Peru, 2017

Cura Ocllo (died 1539) was an Inca queen consort, or coya, as the wife and full sister of the Inca emperor Manco Inca Yupanqui, whose reign over the Inca Empire began in 1533. During the Spanish conquest of the Inca Empire, she was abducted and raped by the Spanish soldier Gonzalo Pizarro in an incident that greatly exacerbated tensions with Yupanqui, who, amidst the fall of the Inca Empire to the Spanish Empire, decried the conduct of Spanish troops towards the Inca people. He subsequently founded the rebellious Neo-Inca State, which was also conquered by the Spanish by 1572.

== Biography ==
=== Early life, marriage, and children ===
Her husband was named Sapa Inca in October 1533 after the death of their common brother Túpac Huallpa, who in his turn had succeeded Atahualpa upon his execution by the Spaniards three months earlier. Manco initially worked as a puppet ruler from the Cuzco branch of the Inca royal family of Huayna Capac, having challenged Atahualpa and the northern tribes from Quito in the Inca Civil War.

Cura Ocllo had a son, Sayri Tupac, with Manco Inca in 1535, during Manco's time in captivity. During the time when Manco Inca was the puppet ruler of the Spaniards in Cuzco, Francisco Pizarro left for Lima, appointing Juan Pizarro governor of Cuzco with a garrison of two hundred Spaniards, in his absence. Juan Pizarro had a bad relationship with Manco Inca, and the Spaniards under Juan and Gonzalo Pizarro subjected Manco Inca and his court to abuse in Francisco Pizarro's absence.

=== Abduction and rape by a Spanish soldier ===
The final event that caused Manco Inca to turn against the Spanish was the rape of his queen. At this point, the Spaniards and their native allies had abducted and raped many women in Cuzco, including princesses, noblewomen and priestesses, the Aclla, some of which were later made wives of the Spaniards. According to Fernandez de Oviedo, Hernando Pizarro, Juan Pizarro and Gonzalo Pizarro "left no one single women or sister of his [Manco's] unviolated", and had taken the Inca princesses as concubines, Among the princesses taken as concubines was Cuxirimay Ocllo, the widow of the former Inca. She was made the concubine of Francisco Pizarro.

According to Titu Cusi, a group of Spaniards under the leadership of Gonzalo Pizarro demanded that Manco give them his queen. Manco Inca dressed his most beautiful concubine as queen, and gave her to the Spaniards, who did not believe she was the queen, and therefore continued to demand to have the queen. After having dressed a number of other women as queens, including his sister Ynguil, whom Pizarro temporarily believed were the queen, Manco Inca was finally forced, after several days stalling, to give up his actual sister wife queen Cura Ocllo, who was raped by Gonzalo Pizarro and kept by him at Pizarro's Palace in Casana. The rape of the queen was a contributing factor in Manco Inca finally deciding to turn against the Spanish, upon the advice of his noblemen, whose wives and daughters had also in many cases been raped, and escape Spanish custody.

==== Inca rebellion against the Spanish conquest ====
Once free, Manco endeavoured to free his land from the Spaniards. Attempting to regain the Inca capital of Cuzco in a ten-month siege in 1536, he failed, and despite a victory over conquistador Francisco Pizarro's brother Hernando at Ollantaytambo in January 1537, he had to withdraw.

==== Execution by the Spanish army ====
Manco was eventually able to secure the release of Cura Ocllo from captivity. In April 1539, during the Spanish warfare against Manco Inca in Vilcabamba, the Mansio Serra de Leguizamon reported that his force had managed to capture "the Inca's woman [Cura Ocllo] and his warrior chief, who was called Cusi Rimache". When the army stopped on their way to Cuzco, some thirty miles from Vilcabamba, in the village of Pampaconas, Cura Ocllo's captors tried to rape her, and she defended herself from further rape by smearing herself in excrement.

Cura Ocllo was kept as a hostage by Pizarro in Ollantay in Yucay valley, after which Pizarro negotiated with peace with Manco Inca. When his messengers were killed, Pizarro had Cura Ocllo stripped, tied to a stake and executed by being shot with arrows by his Canari auxiliaries. Her remains were then put in a basket, per her request, and carried by river to her brother-husband, in the Vilcabamba mountains.

Preceded by Coya Asarpay	Coya; Queen consort of the Inca Empire; 1533 - 1539	Succeeded by Cusi Huarcay
