= Beatriz Clara Coya =

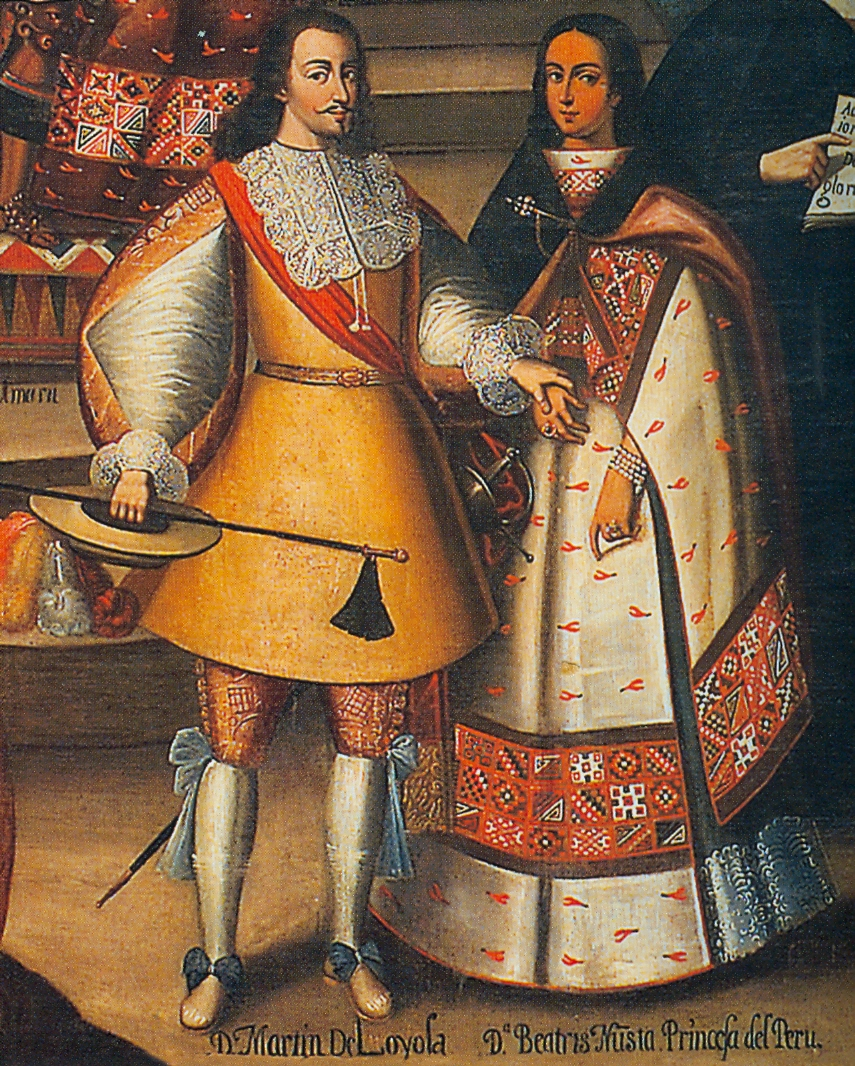
Loyola y Coya

Beatriz Clara Coya (1556 – 1600) was a princess (ñusta) of the Inca Empire.

She was born to Sapa Inca Sayri Túpac (r 1545–1561) and Cusi Huarcay.

She married Martín García Óñez de Loyola and was the mother of Ana María de Loyola Coya.
