= Ñusta =

Inca or Andean upper-class woman

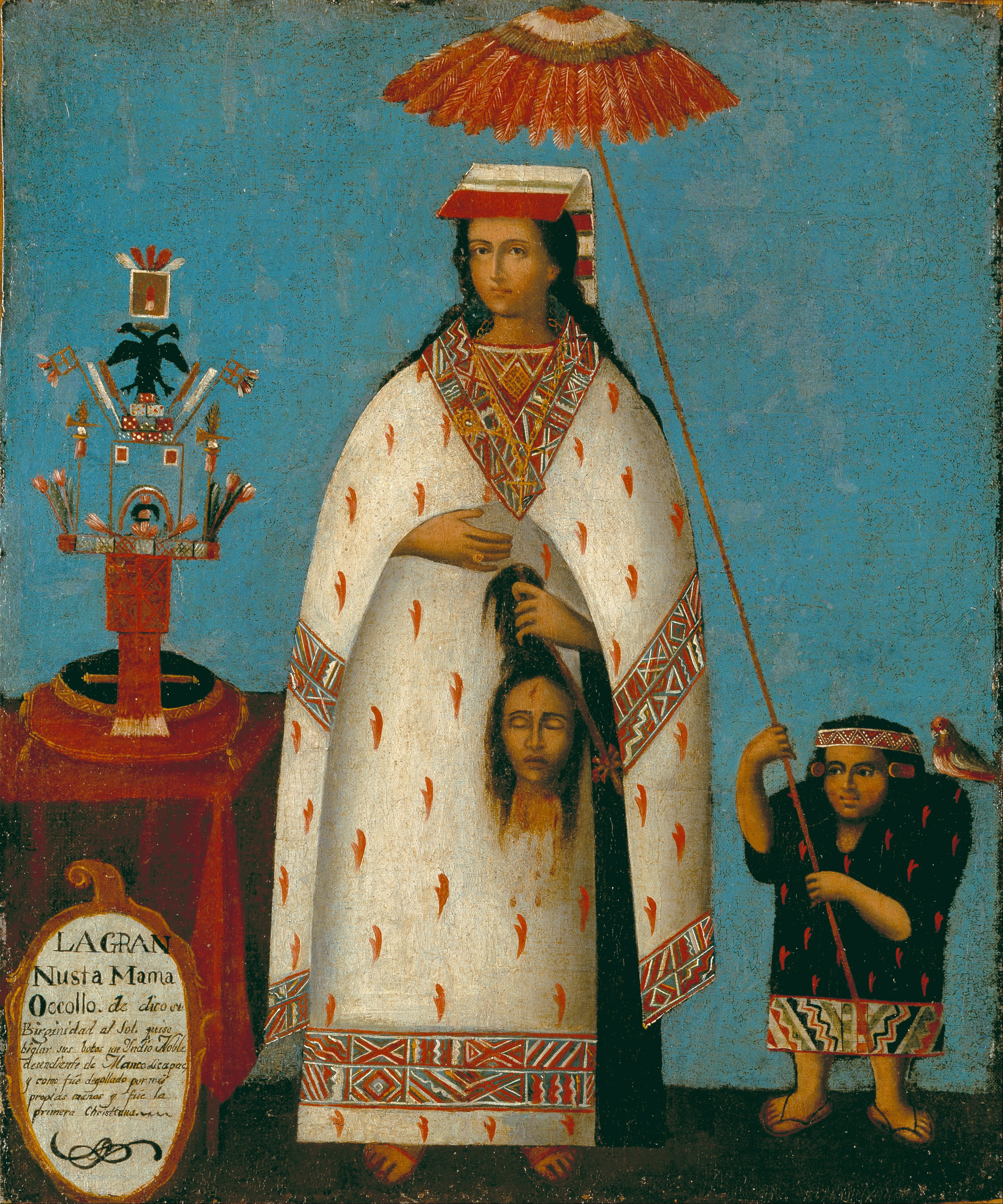
An Inca ñusta in the eighteenth century

Ñusta, which roughly translates to "princess" in the Quechua language, is a term for a highly noble or upper-class woman of Incan or Andean birth who spoke the traditional Cuzco Quechua language. Ñustas were not full descendants of Incan royalty; therefore, the Quechua term was used to denote the regional origin of the ñusta's non-royal parent. A ñusta could range from being the daughter or half-sister of the Sapa Inca himself, one of his lesser wives, or a wife or daughter of another high-ranking male noble such as the heads of local ayllu municipalities (kurakas).

Ñustas typically did not have full Incan status and, therefore, had to have their natal provinces as part of their titles. The Spanish recognized ñustas as noblewomen and added the Spanish title “Doña” to their Christian and Andean names.

The role of the ñusta focused heavily on familial relations. One of the most important foundations and ideologies of Incan culture was family unity and adaptation to a bounded organization. Ñustas also contributed to creating food surpluses and maintaining economic prosperity, both supporting the stabilization of Incan society.

== Marriage ==
As noblewomen, ñustas were traded with neighbouring communities to forge alliances or perpetuate Incan imperial rule. For instance, after defeating a polity, the Sapa Inca would often take a wife from that polity's leading family and marry one of his ñusta daughters to one of his new subjects. The choice of suitor was outside the ñusta's control, and instead was a matter of state policy. Marriage was the most desirable state for a ñusta, for it kept her from dishonourable pursuits and enabled the family to expand.

When Spaniards arrived in the Indigenous Americas, they themselves adopted the practice of trading women after observing the longstanding Incan tradition. This is in fact critical to how they attained power in the Incan imperial system. Indigenous rulers presented European conquistadors with women, specifically ñustas, from the earliest contacts between the two cultures. Through this practice, ñustas were often the first to become intimately acquainted with Spaniards, becoming mediators between the colonizers and colonized, and integrated Europeans into established Incan kinship networks.

While Spaniard–ñusta cohabitation initially began as a means of securing a spot among the Incan elites, legal marriage between Spanish men and ñustas later produced a mixed local elite system that forged the core political and economic networks of Spanish Peru. Ñustas involved in these marriages were often conscious of the political weight their title held and became active agents in the main historical events of this period. The noble status these women inherited through marriage automatically granted them access to some of the richest lands and resources. a prime example is Ñusta Ines Huaylas Yupanqui, who took advantage of her proximity to her conquistador husband to thwart Inca Manco's claim to rule. Likewise, Ñusta Cuxirimay Ocllo used her elite title and relations with the Spaniards to demand possession of numerous lands and laborers in the Yucay Valley near Cuzco.

== Role in the public sphere ==
While ñustas were incredibly sheltered, they did not live in total isolation. They often played active roles in public ceremonies and accompanied their high-ranking male family members to investitures, masses, baptisms, funerals, and other religious ceremonies. Despite being guarded, ñustas lived lives of sociability and comparative luxury: they were better fed, housed, clothed, and attended than any other group of women (except the Coya). Much of a ñusta’s social life was spent gossiping, visiting friends, and participating in church-sponsored charities. Ñustas were additionally renowned weavers and made beautiful textiles. Their clothing featured complex patterns, which showcased their skill and artistry.

Ordinary Incan men and women shared agricultural responsibilities for imperial farmland: harvesting, planting, and plowing. Incan women also went to war alongside their husbands. However, they also maintained the household and cared for their children.

=== Morals ===
The ideal elite woman was a virgin. Consequently, ñustas were raised with close supervision of their sexuality, activities, and education. In the post-colonial period, ñustas were kept out of the public eye, leaving their homes only to go to Mass. Their parents also stressed the Hispanic honor code, which tied female sexual behaviour and virginity to the family's honor. In addition, ñustas were taught to have their family's economic and dynastic interests at heart.

=== Religion ===
The social and political environment in which young ñustas were raised was highly hierarchical, since Incan religion taught that not all mortal people were the same. This belief was bolstered by existing social inequalities to legitimize the structure through which the Coya and other noblewomen attained and held power. These hierarchies were deemed sacred: the Coya was the daughter of the Moon, so female alliances ran deep in the imperial cult. The Coya was in charge of leading priestesses, noblewomen, and common women in their worship of the female goddesses of the imperial cult, including the Moon and the mummies of previous Coyas.

== Coya ==
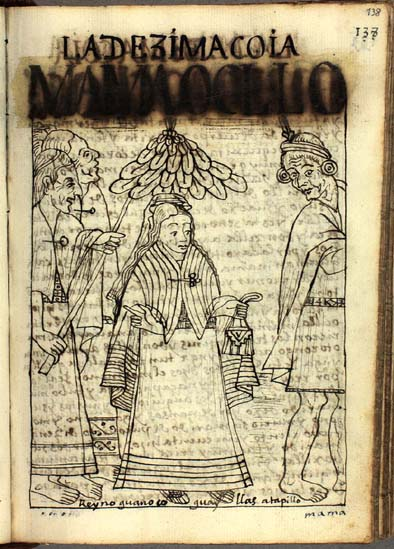
Mama Ocllo Coya

The Incan empire was ruled by the Sapa Inca and the Coya, a king and queen of sorts, who were typically brother and sister. They extended their rule through a broad network of male and female elite locals who were throughout their youth educated in Cuzco on Incan ways of life. The ruling Incas attempted to assimilate their conquered peoples into Incan belief systems by promoting a state ideology that made Incan political affairs and religion inseparable. In Incan society, coyas were only second in importance to the Sapa Inca.

Because coyas was not fully royal, marrying a Sapa Inca enabled a coya to legitimize her children in elite Incan society. She would then provide political guidance to her husband and her sons, of whom one would succeed his father as Sapa Inca. A coya gave voice to the concerns and demands of individuals in the royal family, helping to maintain relationships between the Sapa Inca and other royal relatives.

Young Incan women from around the empire, typically daughters of kurakas, were sent to Cuzco to reside in the palace of the Coya or with other elite Incan noblewomen. These women had authority over the girls and were responsible for educating them in Incan lore and participation in religious rituals. One such ritual was bringing golden pitchers of chicha to the Sapa Inca so that he might offer them to the Sun. Feminine traditions and skills were passed down in these environments as well. The women who hosted these girls were also responsible for marrying them to appropriate men in the empire.

These relationships created bonds of allegiance between Incan noblewomen of varying ranks. They were mutually beneficial for all involved. The girls were housed, educated, and matched with appropriate husbands; the hosting Coya or noblewoman increased her power as the girls they hosted returned to their communities and spread pro-Incan messages to female peasants. This practice created generational cycles of obligation between noblewomen and their social inferiors.

The noblewomen whom the Coya closely ruled over ranged from princesses (ñustas) to great ladies (capac huarmi) to wives of kurakas (kuraka huarmi). The classes of Inca noblewomen were numerous; this list encompasses only a few examples. During the colonial period, "ñusta" and "Coya" would sometimes be integrated into the names of noblewomen to indicate their general nobility without specifically designating them as the sole queen or an actual princess.

== After the Spanish conquest ==
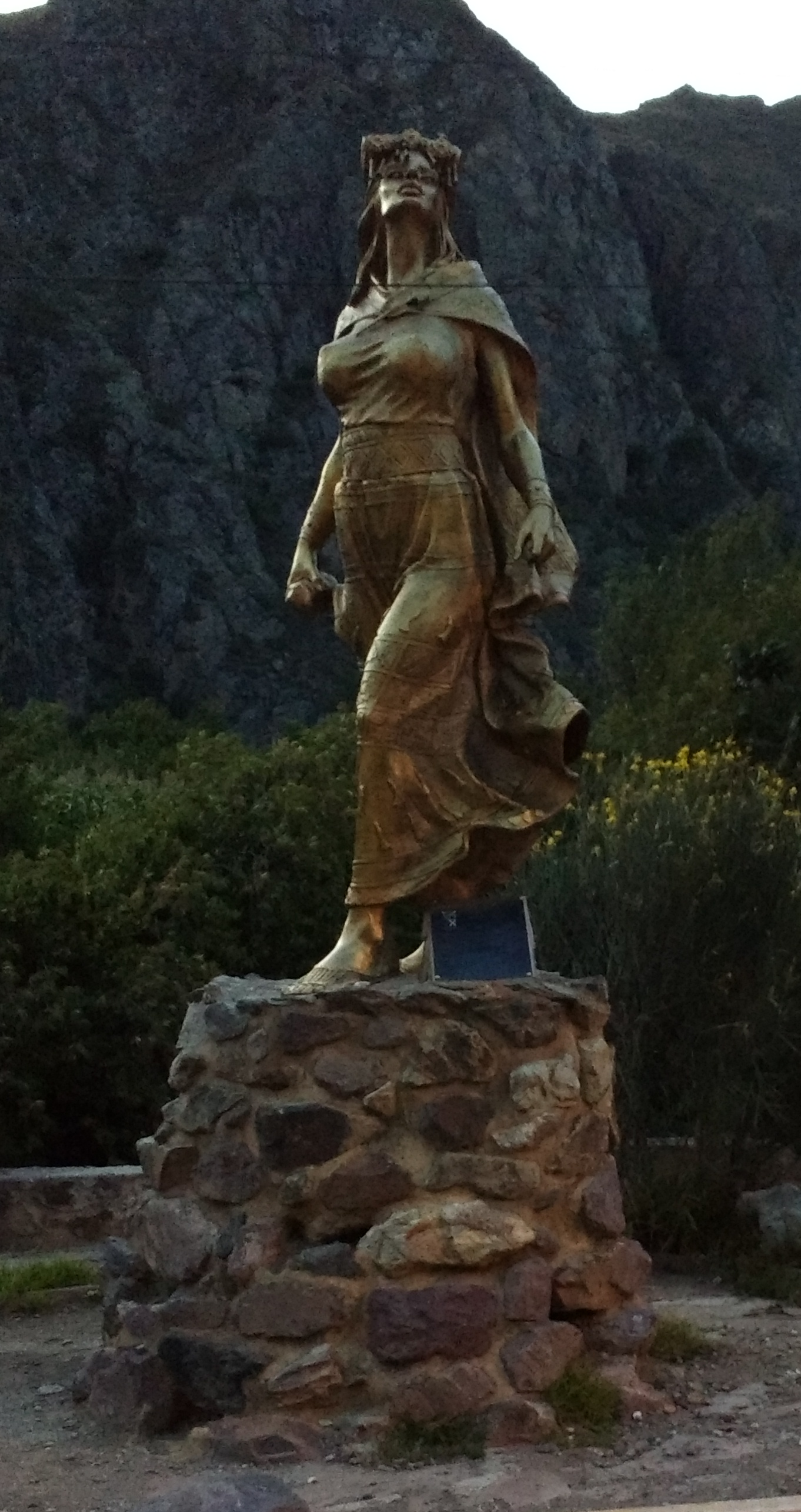
A statue of Ñusta Kura Oqllo in Ollantaytambo, Peru

The Spanish system was strictly patriarchal, whereas Incan society practiced gender parallelism as an extrapolation of their religious ideologies. These conflicting systems caused the original Andean system to fall apart. However, gender parallelism still linger to some extent across Peruvian society despite the Spanish Crown's overarching influence. In pre-conquest Andean societies, women's roles were different from yet complementary to men's, making them equally valuable in terms of societal contribution. For example, even though men's authority did not equal women's authority, women's authority was recognized in traditional indigenous structures.

Andean gender roles were complementary in nature, and both genders were considered necessary to the proper functioning of the Incan empire. The societal ideal of male and female co-leadership originated with the Incan religious belief that the gods they worshipped displayed both masculine and feminine traits. A cacical couple was considered to be more powerful than an individual man or woman. Incan origin myths describe a founding noble couple. Members of Incan communities (ayllus) could trace their lineage back to a common ancestral couple, and leadership positions in ayllus, as in the Incan royal family, were hereditary.

In Incan society, the notion of gender equality existed in theory only. In practice, when the Incas consolidated their control over the Andes, the elite claimed control over all women in the empire and consequently, controlled the distribution of women. Furthermore, men always had higher status wherever the spheres overlapped. Scholars have stressed that among Andean peoples, women did most of the work: they raised children, cooked, produced cloth, and worked alongside men in the fields.

However, because patriarchal Spanish society valued men more highly than women, Andean men gradually became the majority of political leaders in Andean communities. In Spanish society, a woman's legal status was defined by her personal status, primarily whether she was married or single, as outlined by Siete Partidas and the Leyes de Toro, the Spanish Empire's statutory codes and rules. If the woman inherited resources or received a monetary marriage settlement from her husband, she was free to do whatever she wanted with them, but only with the consent of any male subject in her family or her husband. There were, however, ways to circumvent Spanish law. In the traditional indigenous culture, for example, a mother gave her inheritance to her daughter, but this was not permitted under Spanish law. As a result, a male figure had to act as an intermediary for the daughter to receive her intended inheritance from her mother. The drawback was that it provided male figures room to take advantage of women's assets.

== Clothing ==
An important status marker of ñustas was their clothing. The ñañaca, for example, was a small cloth worn atop the head to signify high female rank. Noblewomen also wore llikllas, woven shawls pinned across the chest, over an acsu, a rectangular woven wrapped skirt or dress.

Noblemen also used clothing to signify status, but the Spanish conquest influenced their presentation to become increasingly different from that of noblewomen. They adopted a markedly more Spanish style of dress: trousers, capes, and jackets. By contrast, the dress of noblewomen underwent very little change. This disparity highlighted how men wanted to be perceived as more Spanish to obtain more authority, whereas assimilation into Spanish culture would mitigate women's power. Ñustas were thus less "Hispanicized" than noblemen. As colonial patriarchy persisted and spread throughout the Andes, opposition to female political power increased in indigenous societies.

== Prominent Ñustas ==
=== Beatriz Clara Coya ===
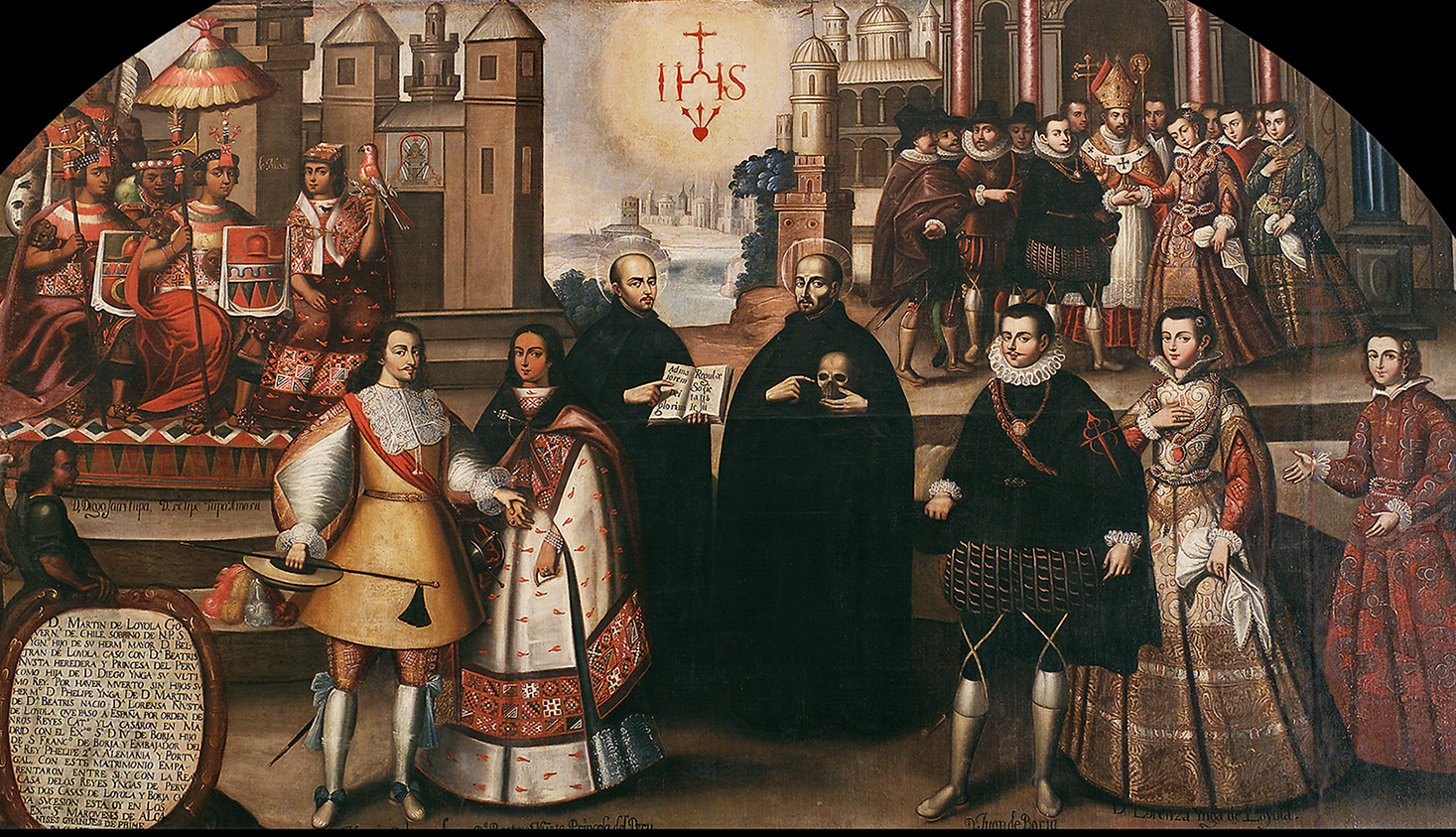
The Marriage of Captain Martin de Loyola to Beatriz Clara Coya (Beatriz Ñusta)

Beatriz Clara Coya (1558–1600), a rare ñusta of full Incan descent, was exceedingly wealthy but was essentially used as a pawn in the battle over Incan status in the colonial Andes. She eventually became an encomendera in the República de Indios, but the Spanish viceroy repeatedly diminished and sabotaged her repartimiento. While she inarguably wielded power, it was consistently constrained by the Spanish, who aimed to turn Incas into subservient Christianized "Indians."

=== Micaela Bastidas Puyucahua ===
The noblewoman Micaela Bastidas Puyucahua (1744–1781), who married the rebel leader José Gabriel Tupcal Amaru Inca, was a key figure in the Incan-inspired rebellion of 1780 against the Spanish colonial system in Peru. Tupac Amaru claimed the right to the Inca title through his ancestors, and Micaela was considered his Coya. She presided over the Incan kingdom (Incario) while Tupac Amaru was at war. She also fulfilled military leadership roles as an advisor, strategist, and commander of warrior troops.
