= Adelphogamy =

Sexual partnership between siblings

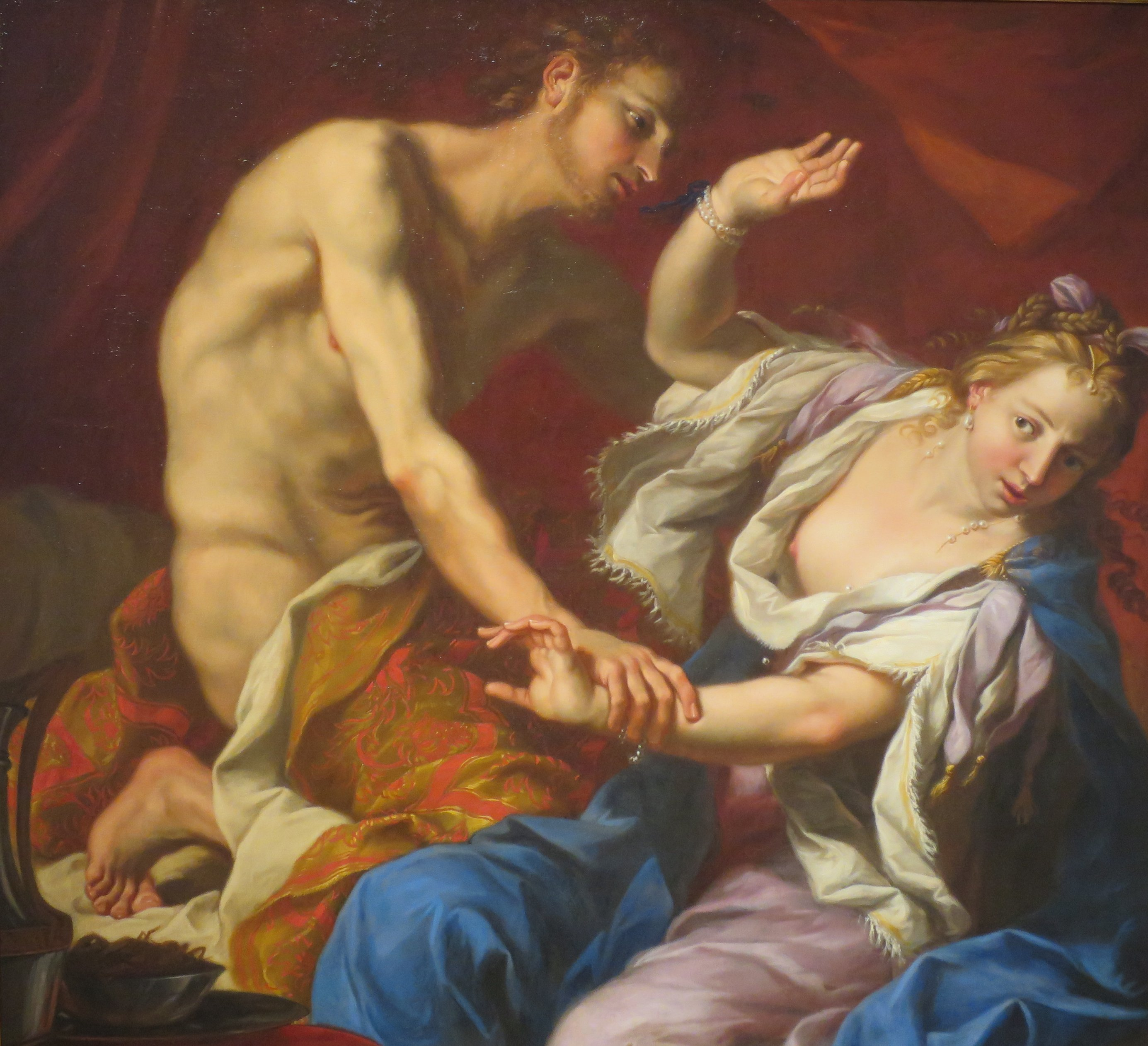
Amnon committed both rape and incest when he assaulted his half-sister Tamar

Adelphogamy is a form of sexual partnership between sibling eukaryotes, especially in some species of fungi, flowering plants or ants, or in humans. In flowering plants, adelphogamy refers to sibling pollination: pollen and stigma belong to two individuals which derives from same mother plant.

In sociology, the term adelphogamy or adelphic polyandry may also refer to fraternal polyandry, or to an incestuous relationship between a brother and sister.

== See also ==
- Incest between twins
- List of coupled siblings
- Sibling relationship § Sibling marriage and incest
