= Rahua Ocllo =

The Coya Rahua Ocllo, or Araua Ocllo (floruit 1532), was a princess and queen consort, Coya, of the Inca Empire by marriage to her brother, the Sapa Inca Huayna Capac (r 1493–1527).

== Life ==
Rahua Ocllo was the daughter of the Inca Topa Inca Yupanqui, and sister of Huayna Capac.

After his succession to the throne in 1493, her brother the Inca first married their sister Coya Cusirimay, who became his queen. He also had many children by several concubines. However, Coya Cusirimay had no sons, and may also have died early on. Topa Inca married another sister, Rahua Ocllo, who became the mother of Huáscar and Chuqui Huipa

=== Reign of Huáscar ===
At the time of her Huayna Capac’ death in 1527, she, her daughter, and his entire harem were in Quito with him. Her spouse had willed his throne to his illegitimate son, her stepson Atahualpa, but her own son Huáscar had the will overturned, executed his fathers’ executors, and claimed the throne for himself. He then ordered for his mother, sister and the rest of the harem to be brought to Cuzco, as he wished to follow the ancient custom to marry his sister, to even more ensure that his own blood line would be completely legitimate.

The wedding was performed with some difficulty. Rahua Ocllo had initially refused to give her consent to it, which was crucial for it to take place. Her reason is reported to have been personal discontent with Huascar, and disapproval of his execution of her late husband's executors. She is reported to have favored the illegitimate son of her spouse, Atahualpa, who had been brought up in her household, before Huascar. As the wedding was important for the succession to continue undisturbed, this presented a problem for Huáscar. She was finally forced to consent, and the wedding and coronation could take place.

Huascar viewed his brother Atauhalpa as a threat and had many people at court executed because he believed their loyalty to be faltering. Atauhalpa, who resided in a different part of the realm, had been absent from the coronation of Huascar. He did, however, send his loyalists and spokespersons with gifts and greetings to the queen and her mother in Cuzco, who received them kindly. This exposed them both to suspicions from Huascar, who assumed them to belong to the opposition and of taking sides with Atauhalpa against him. As soon as the visitors left, Huascar caused a scene by entering the queen's audience chamber and accusing Rahua Ocllo of being the prime adviser of Atauhalpa, and them both of disloyalty. Both Rahua Ocllo and her daughter denied the accusations, and Huascar was not able to prove anything against them. He did, however, had them placed under guard and spies placed around them to report of their every act.

The queen reacted very badly to be placed under such circumstances. Reportedly, she took such offence of being put under watch, that she refrained from eating during day time and only took one meal during the night, to ensure that the spies would have nothing to report, not even such innocent activities such as eating. Her new conditions also caused a depression, and she reportedly took to abuse coca, both to sleep at night but also during day time. The bad relationship between the royal couple was noticed and attracted public attention and bad publicity.

When Huascar had several members of the embassy Atauhalpa had sent to him in Quito executed, the remaining member of his embassy, Quilaco, appealed to the queen and her mother for help. When the civil war erupted between the two brothers, the situation for the queen and her mother became even more difficult. When Atauhalpa escaped from his brothers custody, they were both, reportedly, very close to being arrested and executed.

=== Reign of Atahualpa ===
In 1532, Huascar was defeated and taken prisoner by the army of Atauhalpa, who paraded him in public as a prisoner to the capital of Cuzco after the Battle of Quipaipan. Upon entering the city, the loyalists of Atauhalpa reportedly called Rahua Ocllo a concubine rather than a queen in order to present Huascar as illegitimate. Despite this, Rahua Ocllo approached her captive and deposed son by reproaching him in public. She explained that though he was her son, he deserved his present predicament because of his execution of Atauhalpa's ambassadors, for all his misdeeds, and for having dragged down his entire family including her in his ruin without cause, and slapped him in public.

Preceded by Coya Cusirimay	Coya; Queen consort of the Inca Empire; 1493-1527	Succeeded by Chuqui Huipa
