= Government of the Inca Empire =

The Tawantinsuyu (Quechua: "land of the four quarters") or Inca Empire was a centralized bureaucracy. It drew upon the administrative forms and practices of previous Andean civilizations such as the Wari Empire and Tiwanaku, and had in common certain practices with its contemporary rivals, notably the Chimor. These institutions and practices were understood, articulated, and elaborated through Andean cosmology and thought. Following the Spanish conquest of the Inca Empire, certain aspects of these institutions and practices were continued.

== Philosophy and ideology ==
Inca ideology was founded on Andean cosmology. This cosmology was hierarchical and dualistic, with a variety of opposing forces jostling in position through on-going action. Their worldview was animistic, and their amauta or hamawt'a (teachers or sages) taught that the world was suffused with kamay, meaning "breath" or "life-force". Change was understood as occurring through asymmetries in power between those forces, while pacha, an equilibrium or balance, was struck through ayni, a process of reciprocal exchange. The essential beliefs and divinities of the Inca pantheon were widely established in the Andes by the time the empire arose. Conrad and Demerest argue that these pre-established beliefs were key to the ideological effectiveness of later Inca reforms. While a belief in any number of "high gods", those preeminent aspects of a given pantheon, were common before the Inca, the elevation of the god Inti to a preeminent position was therefore nothing radical. Likewise, cults of the dead were very ancient in the Andes, and so the worship of deceased, mummified Incas attended to by their descendant panaqa groups was not revolutionary. However, as Conrad and Demerest argue, the "simplification" of these beliefs and rituals, "stressing the solar aspects of the ancient divine complex" in the form of Inti as a patron deity of the empire during the reign of Pachacuti. Furthermore, the inclusion of mummified rulers not just into rituals but festivals and state councils elaborated upon the preexisting Andean practice. Pachacuti or pacha kutiy is an appellation created from pacha "world, universe, time-space" and kutiy "(the act of) turning". Pachacuti was, therefore, something whose dynamism and power changed the balance in the world.

The Sapa Inca was conceptualized as divine and was effectively head of the state religion. Only the Willaq Umu (or Chief Priest) was second to the emperor. Local religious traditions were allowed to continue, and in some cases such as the Oracle at Pachacamac (Pacha Kamaq, "vivifier of the world") on the Peruvian coast, were officially venerated. Following Pachacuti, the Sapa Inca claimed descent from Inti, which placed a high value on imperial blood; by the end of the empire, it was common to wed brother and sister. He was "son of the Sun", and his people the intip churin, or "children of the sun," and both his right to rule and mission to conquer derived from his holy ancestor. The Sapa Inca also presided over ideologically-important festivals, notably during the Inti Raymi, attended by soldiers, mummified rulers, nobles, clerics, and the general population of Cuzco beginning on the auspicious June solstice and culminating nine days later with the ritual breaking of the earth using a foot plow by the Inca himself. Moreover, Cuzco itself was considered cosmologically central, loaded as it was with huacas and radiating ceque lines, and geographic center of the Four Quarters; Inca Garcilaso de la Vega himself called it "the navel of the universe."

Land was conceptualized as ultimately belonging to the Inca, and distributed between the three estates of the empire—the imperial church, the commoners, and the state itself—for their benefit and care according to the principle of reciprocity. When a territory was conquered, its chief huaca was brought to Cuzco and installed in either the Coricancha or Temple of the Sun or to its own, special temple, and was maintained by priests from its home province. This old Andean practice performed two functions; first, as divine hostage holding to ensure loyalty; second, as a sign of piety on the part of Inca rulers.

The operational aspect of Inca ideology rested upon the tools of assimilation of nobility and the perpetuation of parochial differences. The formal education in Cuzco of the children of noble families from recently acquired territories disseminated fluency in Quechua, imperial law, and bureaucratic practices. Families which previously held political position were integrated into the Inca bureaucracy, and traditional tribal areas of settlement integrated as provinces, their pre-conquest boundaries typically intact. The continuation of provincial dress was encouraged, serving the function of a social marker. Forcibly resettled populations were likewise not encouraged to assimilate into neighboring, indigenous populations. Many of these administrative techniques seem to have been adopted from the Huari empire.

== Administration ==
=== Officials, classes & institutions ===
The colonial-era sources are not entirely clear or in agreement about the nature of the structure of the Inca government. However, its basic structure can be spoken of broadly, even if the exact duties and functions of government positions cannot be told. At the top of the chain of administration sat the Sapa Inca. Next to the Sapa Inca in terms of power may have been the Willaq Umu, literally the "priest who recounts", who was the High Priest of the Sun. However, it has been noted that beneath the Sapa Inca also sat the Inkap rantin, who was at the very least a confidant and assistant to the Sapa Inca, perhaps along the lines of a prime minister or viceroy. From the time of Topa Inca Yupanqui on, there existed a "Council of the Realm" composed of sixteen nobles: two from hanan Cuzco; two from hurin Cuzco; four from Chinchaysuyu; two from Contisuyu; four from Collasuyu; and two from Antisuyu. This weighting of representation balanced the hanan and hurin divisions of the empire, both within Cuzco and within the Quarters (hanan suyukuna and hurin suyukuna).

Most of the upper tier of Inca administration were Inca by class, if not blood relatives of the Sapa Inca. Besides the Qoya/Coya (the principal wife or queen), royal wives, children and various attaches to the royal family, the royal panakas lineages held great influence. Every time a Sapa Inca died, his heir assumed the throne while the rest of his descendants formed a panaqa, or royal lineage charged with maintaining the deceased king (in the form of his mummy) and his estates, in line with the practice of split inheritance. The deceased king himself, or rather his mallki (mummy), was believed to continue to communicate with the living and so was involved in the affairs of state, be they political or ceremonial. If a mallki could not attend an event, his huaoque, or royal statuette, would. Through blood ties, ample estates with yanakuna (servants or retainers) providing labor, and the possession of totemic and deified mallki, a panaqa was able to wield considerable political power, having influence over the selection of future Sapa Incas.

Beneath the Cuzco-based top-level of government were the suyu, or quarters. Each suyu was led by a governor known as an apu, a title also given to generals and deified mountains. Beneath each suyu were wamani, or provinces, each of which were led by a governor known as a toqrikoq. These lower level governors administered the provinces with the assistance of michuq officers, khipu kamayuq record keepers, kuraka officials, and yanakuna retainers. The primary functions of a toqrikoq were to maintain state infrastructure, organize the census, and mobilize labor or military resources when called upon. Typically, these governors, be they apu or tuqrikuq, were ethnic Inca, but some provincial groups did manage to ascend to the lower level. Apu, on the other hands, were typically close relatives of the Sapa Inca.

The yanakuna formed a unique estate within Inca society and government. To become part of the yanakuna meant severing traditional ayllu ties and obligations, serving the nobility rather than their lineage. For many, it was a way to advance in the social and political hierarchy; being inheritable, it meant a more privileged position for their descendants as well. Their labor was attached to important people or institutions such as the Sapa Inca, a panaqa, the nobility, or to temple lands.

The kurakas on the other hand, were the rank-and-file of the provincial bureaucracy. They were typically provincial nobility who maintained their social status after Inca conquest. Like the yanakuna, they were exempt from taxation and held hereditary status. Unlike the yanakuna, they served administrative, military, and judicial functions, though it is worth mentioning that one could be both a kuraka and a yana.

==== List of Sapa Inca ====
Hurin Cuzco or Rurin Qusqu: The "dynasty" of Lower Cuzco

- Manqo Qhapaq, r. c. 1200 CE – c. 1230
- Sinchi Ruqa, r. c. 1230 – c. 1260
- Lluqi Yupanki, r. c. 1260 – c. 1290
- Mayta Qhapaq, r. c. 1290 – c. 1320
- Qhapaq Yupanki, r. c. 1320 – c. 1350

Hanan Cuzco or Hanan Qusqu: The "dynasty" of Upper Cuzco

- Inka Ruqa, r. c. 1350 – c. 1380
- Yawar Waqaq, r. c. 1380 – c. 1410
- Wiraqucha Inka, r. c. 1410–1438
- Pachakutiy Inka Yupanki, r. 1438–1471
- Tupa Inka Yupanki, r. 1471–1493
- Wayna Qhapaq, r. 1493–1527
- Waskhar, r. 1527–1532
- Ataw Wallpa, r. 1532–1533

Post-Conquest dynasty: Ruling from Cuzco or Vilcabamba

- Tupa Wallpa, r. 1533
- Manqu Inka Yupanki, r. 1533 – 1544 initially in Cuzco, then in Vilcabamba (the capital of the Neo-Inca State)
  - Pawllu Inka Tupa, r. 1536 – 1549 in Cuzco under Spanish
- Sayri Tupa, r. 1544 – 1560 in Vilcabamba
- T’itu Kusi Yupanki, r. 1560 – 1571
- Tupa Amaru, r. 1571 – 1572, captured and executed

=== Decimal administration ===
While there was a great deal of variation in the form that Inca bureaucracy and government took at the provincial level, the basic (perhaps, ideal) form of organization was decimal. In this system of organization, taxpayers—male heads of household of a certain age range—were organized into corvée units (which often doubled as military units) that formed the muscle of the state as part of mit'a service. Each level of jurisdiction above one hundred tax-payers was headed by a kuraka, while those heading smaller units were kamayuq, a lower, non-hereditary status. However, while kuraka status was hereditary, one's actual position within the hierarchy (which was typically served for life) was subject to change based upon the privileges of those above them in the hierarchy; a pachaka kuraka (see below) could be appointed to their position by a waranqa kuraka. Furthermore, it has been suggested that one kuraka in each decimal level also served as the head of one of the nine groups at a lower level, so that one pachaka kuraka might also be a waranqa kuraka, in effect directly responsible for one unit of 100 tax-payers and less directly responsible for nine other such units.

Official in Charge	Number of Tax-Payers
Hunu kuraka	10,000
Pichkawaranqa kuraka	5,000
Waranqa kuraka	1,000
Pichkapachaka kuraka	500
Pachaka kuraka	100
Pichkachunka kamayuq	50
Chunka kamayuq	10

=== Mit’a and mitma ===
While the Inca state exacted taxes in kind—e.g., textiles, grain, wares, etc.—it also drew upon corvée labor as an important supply of power. The mit'a was a labor tax performed by male heads of households. These taxpayers were drafted to build massive public works projects, such as aqueducts, bridges, roads, as well as tampu warehouses. A mit’ayuq, "one who carried out mit’a duties", also performed agricultural, extractive (e.g., mining), and artisanal (e.g., working ceramics and metals) labor for the state. Mit'a was also the basis of military conscription; military units followed the same decimal system of administration as mit'a units. Periods of service varied; especially intensive service, such as mining, was kept short to avoid exhaustion.

Mitmas, on the other hand, was the practice of moving certain ethnic groups around for strategic purposes. They could be seen as loyal, and therefore transplanted as a garrison colony to help maintain order in a newly conquered province, or, alternatively, be seen as questionably loyal and therefore settled among more loyal populations. In certain cases, colonizing mitmaq groups were used to exploit ecozones not seen as efficiently or productively used by native groups.

Despite moving perhaps hundreds of miles to new homes, mitmas were still considered members of their original, native group and land for census and mit'a purposes. The mitmaqkuna were not the only people resettled in the Inca empire, as the state had innumerable communities relocated to less defensible, more productive land in order to both make agricultural production more efficient and reduce the possibility of revolt.

=== Schematic of hierarchy ===
Qosqo (Central)	Suyu (Quarter)	Wamani (Province)	Decimal Administration
Sapa Inka, the supreme ruler: Qoya, his Queen and principal wife; His children by his Qoya; Her attendant relatives; Lesser wives; His children by them; Their attendant relatives	Apu, the Governor of a suyu: Relatives of the Sapa Inca	Tuqrikuq, the Governor of a wamani: Typically ethnic Inca	Kuraka, hereditary bureaucratic officials: Typically provincial nobility
Inkap Rantin, a viceroy: A close relative of the Inca	Attendant yanakuna retainers	Attendant yanakuna retainers	Kamayuq, non-hereditary bureaucratic officials
Willaq Umu, the High Priest of the Sun		Michuq, assisting officers	Mit’ayuq tax-payers: Corvée labor and military service
Council of the Realm, consisting of: Four nobles from Qosqo; Two from hanan Qosqo; Two from hurin Qosqo; Six nobles from the hanan suyu; Four from Chinchaysuyu; Two from Kuntisuyu; Six nobles from the hurin suyu; Four from Qollasuyu; Two from Antisuyu		Khipu kamayuq, record keepers	
Tukuy rikuq, inspectors reporting to the Sapa Inca: Close relatives of the Sapa Inka		Chaski, messengers	
Mallki, royal mummies: Maintained by panaqa, royal lineages; Attendant yanakuna retainers			
Apukuna, military Generals			

== Laws ==
Inti as represented by José Bernardo de Tagle of Peru.

The Inca state had no separate judiciary or codified set of laws. While customs, expectations, and traditional local power holders did much in the way of governing behavior, the state, too, had legal force, such as through tukuy rikuq (lit. "he who sees all"), or inspectors. The highest such inspector, typically a blood relation to the Sapa Inca, acted independently of the conventional hierarchy, providing a point of view for the Sapa Inca free of bureaucratic influence.

Individuals could only be judged by those of higher rank. Moreover, ones as one's rank increased, the latitude of behavior granted to them rose as well; punishments for acts by commoners against nobles were far more severe than for those by nobles against commoners. And yet there were also legal protections for commoners, despite their unequal legal standing. Soldiers who stole food could face capital punishment, as could their captains. Abusive or negligent officials likewise faced punishment. The sentencing of an individual to death rested only among the highest authorities: provincial governors, the apu of the four suyu, and the Sapa Inca himself. The Incas did not have prisons. Instead capital punishment was used for offenses including murder, blasphemy, adultery, theft, laziness, second offenses in drunkenness and rebellion. Punishment for lesser crimes included blinding and cutting off limbs.

== Organization of the empire ==
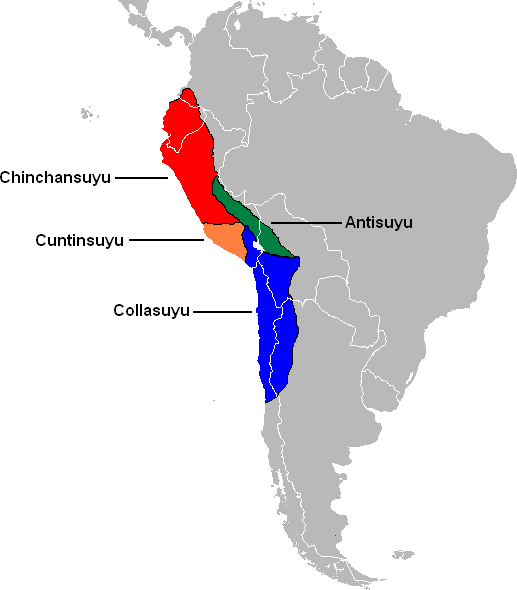
The four suyus of the empire.

The Inca Empire was a federalist system which consisted of a central government with the Inca at its head and four quarters, or suyu: Chinchay Suyu (northwest), Antisuyu (northeast), Kuntisuyu (southwest), and Qullasuyu (southeast). The four corners of these quarters met at the center, Cuzco. These suyu were likely created around 1460 during the reign of Pachacuti before the empire assumed it largest territorial extent. It is probably the case that at the time the suyu were established they were roughly of equal size and only later changing their proportions as the empire expanded north and south along the Andes.

Each suyu was further subdivided into wamani, or provinces. These wamani were districts that were roughly geographically coterminous with pre-conquest tribal groupings administered by a tokrikoq, or governor. However, the differential populations of these tribes were taken into account and if they were found to be too small to establish their own wamani, they were put together with other small tribes. Following the creation of a wamani, the Inca would establish an administrative center known as a hatoñ. The naming of these centers was formulaic; the center of the Colla wamani was hatoñ qolla, while that of the Sora wamani was hatoñ sora, et cetera.

Wamani were then further subdivided into saya, reflecting the largely moietal structure of Andean society. The number of saya per wamani varied between two and three, typically the former. These saya were of differential status, with one being higher (the hanan saya) and one lower (the hurin saya). Ideally each saya would contain roughly 10,000 taxpayers. Therefore, three saya were typically only established in those wamani with around 30,000 taxpayers. Following the saya subdivision, the empire was subdivided into ayllu lineage groups, which were then again divided into upper hanan and lower hurin moieties, and then into individual family units.

=== Administrative divisions ===
The capital area, Cusco, was likely not organized as a wamani. Rather, it was probably somewhat akin to a modern federal district, like Washington, D.C., or Mexico City. The city sat at the center of the four suyu and served as the preeminent center of politics and religion. While Cuzco was essentially governed by the Sapa Inca, his relatives, and the royal panaqa lineages, each suyu was governed by an Apu, a term of great esteem used for men of very high status and for venerated mountains. Just as with so much of Andean society and Inca administration, both Cuzco as a district and the four suyu as administrative regions were grouped into upper hanan and lower hurin divisions. As the Inca did not have written records, it is impossible to exhaustively list the constituent wamani. However, records created during the Spanish colonial period allow us to reconstruct a partial list. There were likely more than 86 wamani, with more than 48 in the highlands and more than 38 on the coast.

==== Hanan Suyukuna, or the Upper Quarters ====
The most populous suyu, Chinchaysuyu encompassed the former lands of the Chimú Empire and much of the northern Andes. At its largest extent, the suyu extended through much of modern Ecuador and just into modern Colombia. The second smallest of the suyu, Antisuyu was located northeast of Cuzco in high Andes. Indeed, it is the root of the word "Andes."

Chinchaysuyu	Antisuyu
Atavillo of Atawillu, in the modern province of Canta.; Ayavaca or Ayawax'a; Cajamarca or Q'asamarka; Cajatambo or Q'asatampu; Calva or Kalua; Casma; the Chachapoya culture, including the Huanca people; Chancay; Chao or Suo; Chicama; Chicla or Chillqa; Chimbote or Sancta; the Chimú culture, also called the Moche culture.; Chincha; Chinchayqucha, also called in sources by the name of Junín.; Conchuco; Huacrachuco; Huamachuco; Huamali; Huambo or Wampu; Huancabamba or Wañkapampa; Huancavilca or Wankawillka; Huánuco; Huarco, also called Runawana and Cañete; Huarmey; Huaura, also called Huacho or Supe; Huayla or Waylla; Lambayeque, whose Sican culture spoke Mochica.; Lima or Rimaq, a large province of perhaps 150,000 inhabitants.; Lurin, home of the Oracle at Pachacamac.; Mala; Moyobamba or Muyupampa; Nepeña or Wampachu; Ocro, including both the Ocro and Lampa tribes.; Olmos or Olmo; Pacasmayo; Parmunca; Pinco; Pisco or Pisqu; Piura; Tarma (Tarama); Tumbes (Tumpis); Virú (Wanapu), likely the origin of the word Perú.; Yauyo, including the Larao tribe.	Asháninka; Ch'unchu people; Cunibo; Lare or Lari, whose people were "Incas by privilege"; Machiguenga; Omasayo or Umasuyu; Paucartambo (Pawkartampu); Piro; Shipibo-Conibo; Vilcabamba (Willkapampa)

==== Hurin Suyukuna, or the Lower Quarters ====
Collasuyu or Qollasuyu was named after the Aymara-speaking Qolla people and was the largest of the quarters in terms of area. This suyu encompassed the Bolivian Altiplano and much of the southern Andes, running down into Argentina and as far south as the Maule river near modern Santiago, Chile. Cuntisuyu or Kuntisuyu was the smallest suyu of all was located along the southern coast of modern Peru, extending into the highlands towards Cuzco.

Collasuyu	Cuntisuyu
Arica or Arika; Cana or Kana; Canche or Kanche; Caranga or Karanka; Caruma; Cavina or Kawina, whose people were "Incas by privilege"; Chicha; Cochabamba or Quchapampa; Collagua; Lipe; Locumba; Lupaqa; Moquegua; Pacajes or Pacasa; Qolla Urcosuyu; Sama; Tambo or Tampu; Tarata; Ubina; Yampará or Yanpará	Acari; Angará; Arequipa or Ariqipa; Atico; Aymará; Camaná, inhabited by the Maje people; Caravelí; Cavana or Kawana; Chanca or Chanka, also called Andahuayla or Andawaylla.; Chilque, whose people were "Incas by privilege".; Choclococha; Chocoruo or Chukurpu; Chumbivilca or Chumpiwillka; Contisuyo or Kuntisuyu, including the Alca, Cotahuasi and Aruni peoples; Cotabamba or Qotapampa; Huanca or Warka, including three saya; Ica or Ika; Nazca or Naska; Ocoña or Ukhuña; Parinacocha or Pariwanaqucha; Quechua or Qhichwa; Quilca; Rucana or Ruk'ana; Sora, divided into three saya; Vilcas or Willka; Yanahuara or Yanawara, whose people were "Incas by privilege"; Yauca

== Titles and position ==
- Mallku
  - Apu Mallku
- Kuraka

== See also ==
- Aztec Government
- Economy organization of the Inca Empire
