= Coya Asarpay =

Princess and queen consort of the Inca Empire

Coya Asarpay or Azarpay (died 1533), was a princess and queen consort of the Inca Empire by marriage to her brother, the Sapa Inca Atahualpa (r. 1532–1533).

Asarpay was the daughter of the Inca Huayna Capac. She married her brother, the succeeding Inca, in accordance with ancient custom. She was the "First Princess of the Empire", and her sisters included Kispe Sisa, Kura Okllu, Marca Chimbo, Pachacuti Yamqui, Miro, Kusi Warkay, Francisca Coya and others.^{:112}

Her husband was executed in 1533 by the Spaniards, who accused him of incest and idolatry, charges which would apply also to her.

At one point, according to Pedro Pizarro, the Spanish treasurer, Navarro, asked Fernando Pizarro for permission to force Azarpay to be his wife. Hearing this, Azarpay escaped to Carajima. Later, she was recaptured and brought to the house of Fernando Pizarro in Lima. Pedro Pizarro states that shortly thereafter Incas besieged the city, and Fernando Pizarro believed that they had been told to do so by Azarpay, and that killing her would make it more likely they would lift the siege.

She was executed by garroting on the order of Francisco Pizarro.

Preceded by Chuqui Huipa	Coya; Queen consort of the Inca Empire; 1532 - 1533	Succeeded by Cura Ocllo
