= Sayri Túpac =

Third puppet Sapa Inca of the Inca Empire

- Prince of Yucay
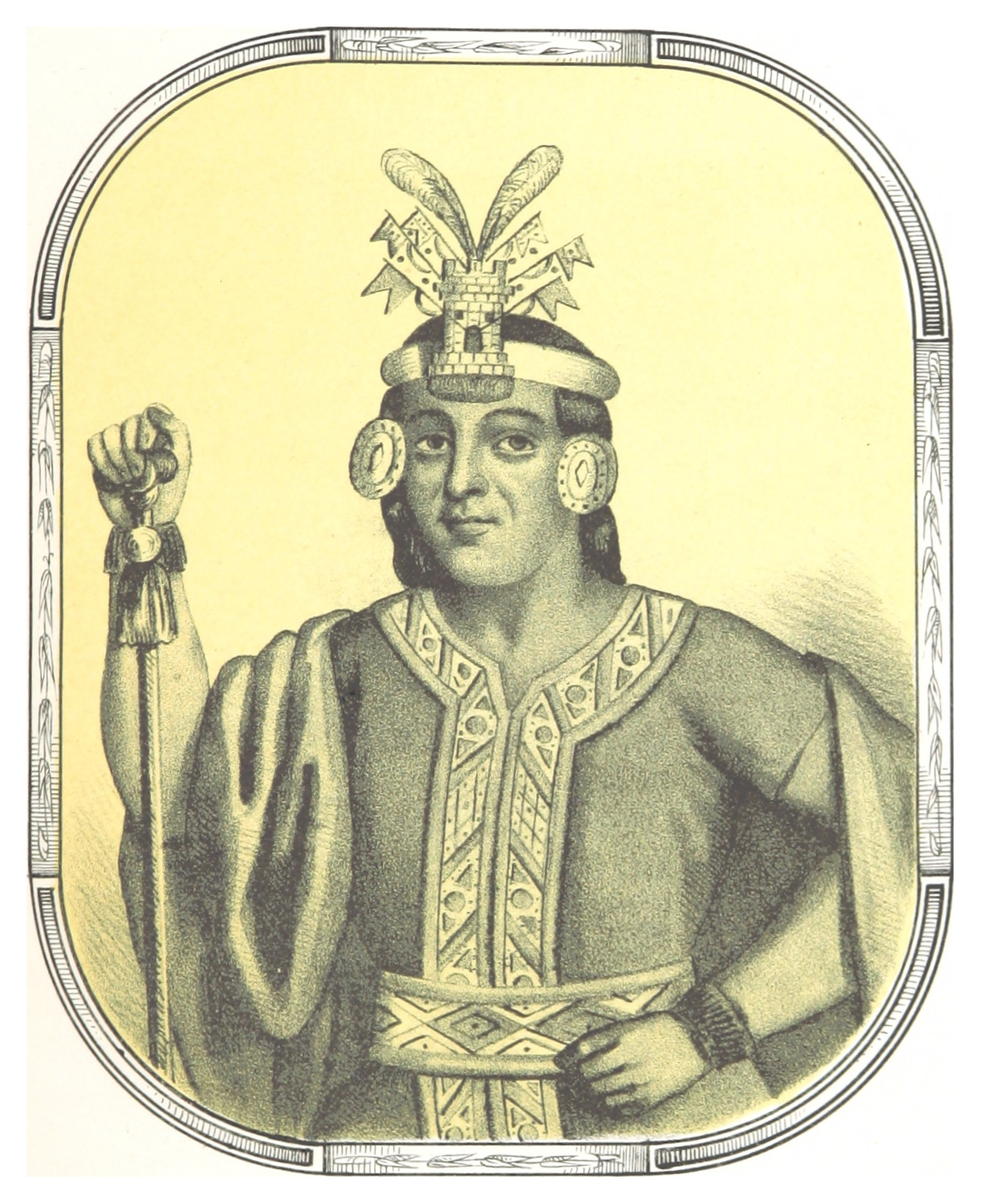
- 1850 depiction by Justo Sahuaraura Inca

Sapa Inca of the Neo-Inca State
- Reign: 1544–1560
- Coronation: 1545
- Predecessor: Manco Inca Yupanqui
- Successor: Titu Cusi Yupanqui
- Born: 1535/1539
- Died: 1560; Yucay, Neo-Inca State
- Consort: Cusi Huarcay
- Issue: Beatriz Clara Coya
- Quechua: Sayri Tupac
- Spanish: Sayri Túpac
- Dynasty: Hanan Qusqu
- Father: Manco Inca Yupanqui
- Mother: Cura Ocllo

Sayri Túpac (1534/1535 – 1560) was an Inca ruler in Peru. He was a son of siblings Manco Inca Yupanqui and Cura Ocllo. After the death of his mother in 1539 and of his father in 1544, both at the hands of Spanish conquerors, he became the ruler of the Neo-Inca State in Vilcabamba. He ruled until his death in 1560.

== Life ==
Sayri Túpac's father Manco, the last ruling Inca emperor, had attempted to reach an accommodation with the Spanish conquistadors. He was crowned emperor in 1534 by Francisco Pizarro. However, his cooperation was severely tested by mistreatment at the hands of Francisco's brothers Gonzalo, Juan and Hernando, whom Francisco had temporarily left in charge in Cuzco. Manco escaped from the city in April 1536 and raised a large army of Inca warriors. For ten months he besieged Cuzco but failed to take the city.

After the defeat of Diego de Almagro II El Mozo in the Battle of Chupas (1542) against the army of the Spanish viceroy, some of Almagro's supporters took refuge at Manco's residence in Vilcabamba. Two years later they killed Manco in front of Sayri Túpac's brother Titu Cusi.

Sayri Túpac was a child at the time. He became Inca in Vilcabamba, reigning for ten years with the aid of regents. This was a time of peace with the Spanish. Viceroy Pedro de la Gasca offered to provide Sayri Túpac with lands and houses in Cuzco if he would emerge from the isolated Vilcabamba. Sayri Túpac accepted, but during the preparations his relative Paullu Inca suddenly died. This was taken as a bad omen (or a sign of Spanish treachery), and Sayri Túpac remained in Vilcabamba.

In 1556 a new Spanish viceroy, Andrés Hurtado de Mendoza, 3rd Marquis of Cañete, arrived in the colony. Although the Inca in Vilcabamba was no longer ruler of an Indigenous empire, he was still ruler of an independent native state. Like Viceroy Gasca before him, Hurtado believed it would be safer for the Spanish if Sayri Túpac could be enticed to live in the area of Spanish settlement, where the conquistadors could control him.

The negotiations took time, but Sayri Túpac did agree to leave Vilcabamba. He traveled in a rich litter with 300 attendants. On 5 January 1558, he was received amicably by Viceroy Hurtado in Lima. Sayri Túpac renounced his claim to the Inca Empire and accepted baptism as Diego. In return he received a full pardon, the title of Prince of Yucay, and great estates with rich revenues. He became resident in Yucay, a day's journey northeast of Cuzco. Significantly, he left behind the Mascaipacha, a crown with red fringe, which was the symbol of his authority as Sapa Inca over the Incan Empire. In Cuzco, he married his sister Cusi Huarcay after receiving a special dispensation from Pope Julius III. They had a daughter, Nusta Beatriz, who married Martın Garcia Loyola.

Sayri Túpac never returned to Vilcabamba.

He died in 1560 in Yucay. His half-brother Titu Cusi Yupanqui took control of Vilcabamba and the Inca resistance to the Spanish. Titu Cusi suspected that Sayri Túpac had been poisoned by the Spanish. Spanish sources, chiefly Poma de Ayala and Inca Garcilaso, believe the culprit was Chilche, who would have poisoned Sayri Túpac to seize his lands and concubines.

== Gallery ==
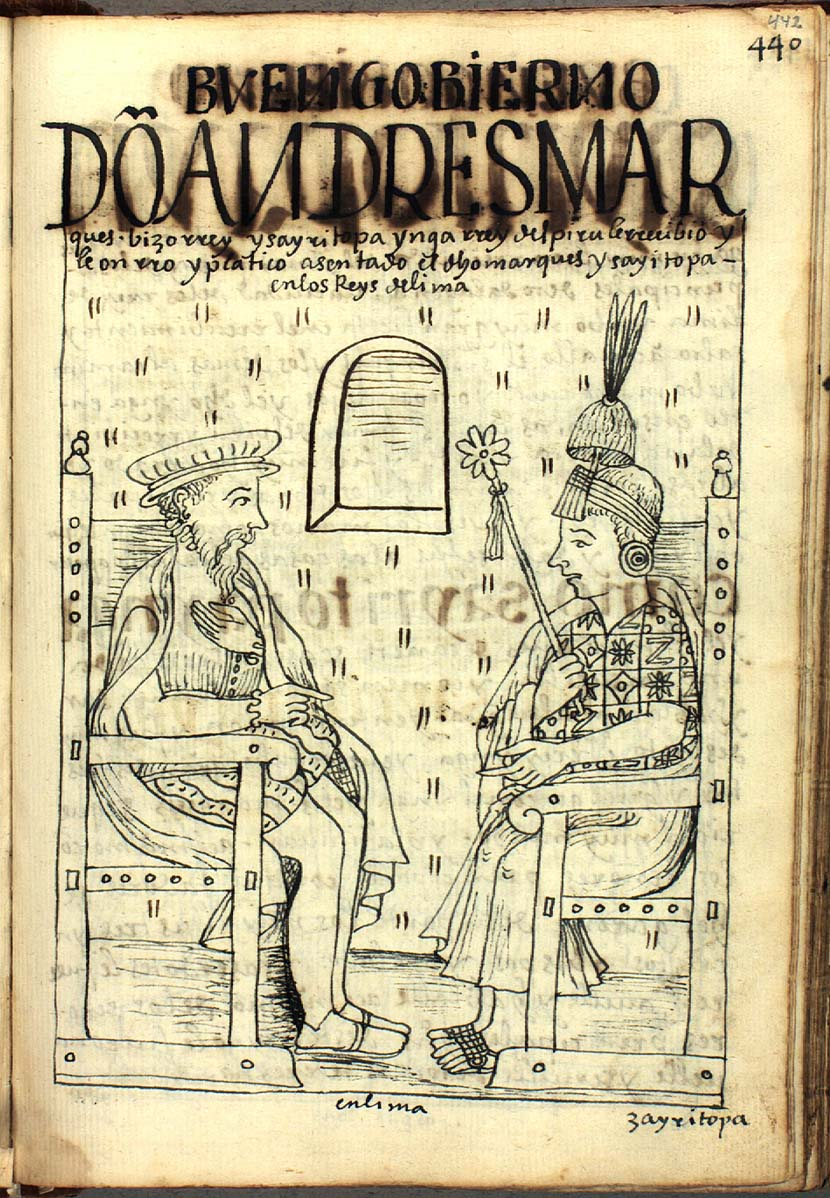
Viceroy Don Andrés Hurtado de Mendoza receives Sayri Túpac Inca, King of Peru, and honors him in Lima

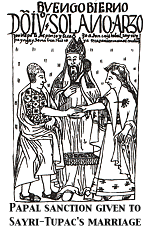
Papal sanction given to Sayri Túpac's marriage

== See also ==
- Túpac Amaru

Regnal titles
Preceded by Manco Inca Yupanqui	Sapa Inca (as ruler of the Neo-Inca State); 1544-1560	Succeeded by Titu Cusi Yupanqui
