= Split inheritance =

The Inca practice of Split Inheritance was the process in which a ruler's chosen successor obtained all political power and rights, while the dead ruler maintained control over all the lands he had conquered during his life. The term was coined by Arthur A. Demarest & Geoffrey W. Conrad in 1984.

In addition, the newly enthroned Inca king would be required to build his own palace complex and burial chamber. This was because the city from which the new king would rule had to be in a territory that he had conquered himself. For this reason, supreme effort was made by rulers to secure as much land as possible, to ensure not only wealth for one's descendants and cult, but also to secure a place for eternity. Thanks to conquest, Incan kings were able to procure valuable resources such as gold and silver to ensure entrance into the afterlife with greater riches. This was consistent with the Inca belief of eternity in the afterlife being dependent upon such proliferative measures taken during time on earth. Tributes, demand for labor, and extravagant conquests made this a system which thoroughly simplified Inca history to a barrage of conquests and land appropriation.
