= Paullu Inca =

Pawllu Inka Tupaq
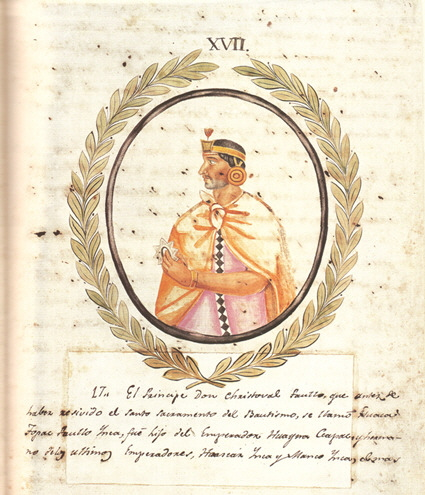

Sapa Inca of the Inca Empire
- Reign: 1537 – 1549
- Installation: 1537
- Predecessor: Manco Inca
- Successor: Last Inca to be named by the Spanish
- Born: between 1520 and 1535
- Died: c. 1550
- Dynasty: Hanan Qusqu
- Father: Huayna Capac
- Mother: Añas Colque

Pawllu Inka Tupaq (born after 1520 but before 1535 – c. 1550) was a member of the Inca Nobility who was involved in Inca politics during the Spanish conquest of the Inca Empire. He was the main Indigenous ally for different Spanish factions after Manco Inca Yupanqui rebelled against the Spanish and established the small Neo-Inca State in Vilcabamba.

== Biography ==
He was the son of Huayna Capac and half brother of Ninan Cuyochi, Huáscar, Atahualpa, Túpac Huallpa and Manco Inca Yupanqui.

In the early part of Manco Inca's reign, he was a strong supporter of Manco Inca, who ordered him and the high priest Villac Umac to accompany Diego de Almagro's expedition to Chile in 1535. Both awaited Almagro at Tupiza and there delivered to him a large quantity of gold from the Chilean tribute. At Jujuy, Villac Umac escaped and returned to Peru, during his journey fomenting a general revolution against the Spaniards, at the instigation of Manco Inca.

When Almagro's expedition returned, Manco Inca had Cusco under siege. The return of Diego de Almagro and his several hundred troops precipitated the end of the siege. Paullu Inca did not follow Manco Inca's call to join his attack on the Spaniards in 1536. sided with the Spanish, and was recompensed for his services by receipt of the property of his brother Huáscar.

A Spaniard wrote to the Spanish crown, describing Paullu as "a true friend of the Christians and Your Majesty, . . . and it is the truth that he has been a great pillar of support in these parts, for if he had fallen and tried to destroy things, the extinction of all the Spaniards living in Peru, little by little, would have begun." Mancio Serra de Leguizamo wrote of Paullu, "if the Inkas had not favored the Spaniards, it would have been impossible to win this kingdom."

Paullu was crowned Sapa Inca after the departure of Manco Inca.

After Almagro took possession of Cuzco and captured the brothers Pizarro, Paullu, at the head of the Incas, aided Almagro to defeat the forces of Alonso de Alvarado at Abancay. Paullu also took part in the battle of Salinas at the head of 6,000 Incas, and in 1539 he accompanied Gonzalo Pizarro in the war against the Incas of Charcas.

Charles V recommended him to the viceroy Blasco Núñez Vela, and wrote to Paullu a letter expressing his gratitude. In 1543 he was baptized under the name of Cristóbal. In contrast to most of his brothers, he died a peaceful death in approximately 1550. He was buried in the church that he built in Cuzco.

=== Descendants ===
Paullu's principal wife, Mama Ussica, was baptized as Catalina in 1543. Their son and heir, Carlos Inca, was raised alongside the children of conquistadors.

Paullu had numerous children outside his marriage. All of them were left out of his testament despite a previous royal decree that had legitimized a large number of them, putting an end to the title of "Sapa Inca". One of his sons, named Carlos Inca, would serve as a spiritual successor under the title of Regent of Cuzco serving as head in religious ceremonies, participating in the trade of Coca leaves and in the hiring of Indians to work on the mines of Potosí.

Paullu's grandson, and Carlos Inca's son; Melchor Carlos Inca inherited his father's properties at age 11 in 1582, after the former's death. He lived in Cuzco and served as a Knight of Santiago, as did his son Juan Melchor Carlos Inca, one of Melchor's 4 illegitimate children.

Juan Melchor moved to Spain and died travelling to Barcelona alongside a military company in 1630, leaving no descendants.

Regnal titles
Preceded by Manco Inca Yupanqui	Sapa Inca; As installed by the Spaniards; 1537–1549	Succeeded by Title abolished Carlos Inca (as Regent of Cuzco)
