= Manco Inca Yupanqui =

Second puppet Sapa Inca of the Inca Empire

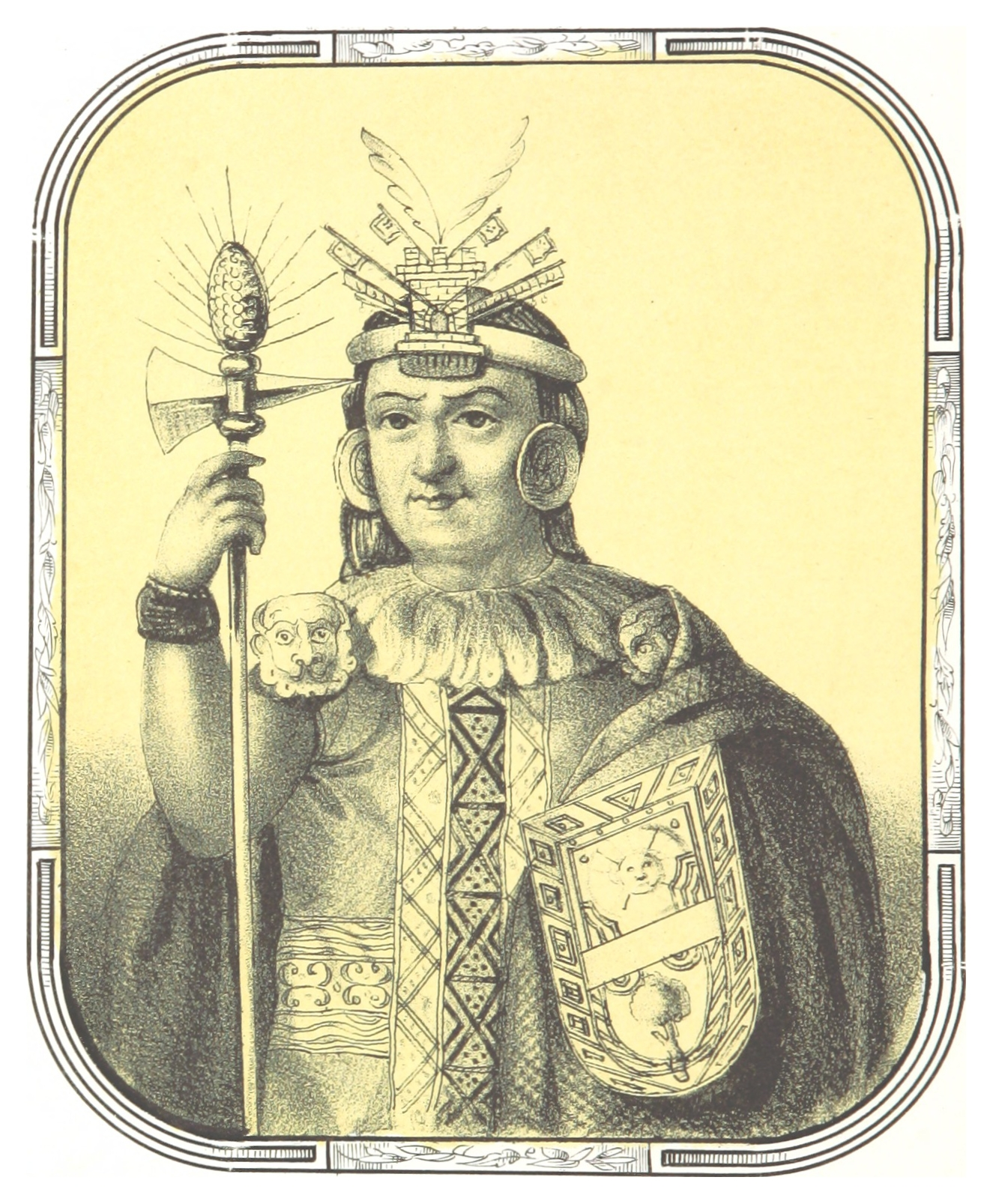

Sapa Inca of the Neo-Inca State
- Reign: 1537–1544
- Coronation: 1537
- Predecessor: State established
- Successor: Sayri Tupaq

Sapa Inca of the Inca Empire
- Reign: 1533–1537
- Installation: 1533
- Predecessor: Túpac Huallpa (as puppet Sapa Inca of the Inca Empire); Atahualpa (as legitimate Sapa Inca of the Inca Empire)
- Successor: Paullu Inca (as puppet Sapa Inca of the Inca Empire)
- Born: c. 1515; Cusco, Inca Empire
- Died: 1544 (aged 28); Vilcabamba, Neo-Inca State
- Consort: Cura Ocllo
- Issue: Sayri Túpac; Titu Cusi; Túpac Amaru; Cusi Huarcay
Names
- Manco Inca Yupanqui
- Quechua: Manqu Inka Yupanki
- Spanish: Manco Inca Yupanqui
- Dynasty: Hanan Qusqu
- Father: Huayna Cápac
- Mother: Mama Runtu
- Religion: Inca religion

Manco Inca Yupanqui (Cusco Quechua: Manqu Inka Yupanki, c. 1515 – 1544) was the founder and first Sapa Inca of the independent Neo-Inca State in Vilcabamba, although he was originally a puppet Inca Emperor installed by the Spaniards. He was also known as Manco II and Manco Cápac II. He was one of the sons of Huayna Cápac and a younger brother of Huáscar.

== Biography ==
=== Origin and enthronement ===
Manco Inca, one of the more than 50 sons of Huayna Capac, was born in Cuzco in 1515. His early history is obscure. He took part in the conquest of the Antisuyu in Bolivia during the years 1532-1533.

When Atahualpa's troops took the city under the command of General Quizquiz, they killed the descendants of Huayna Cápac, the Huascar supporters, and anyone who could try to take the place of the Inca. Because of this, Manco Inca was forced to flee, avoiding any contact with the Atahualpists.

On 14 November 1533, he met the conquistador Francisco Pizarro and his contingent, both Inca and Spanish. This and other events, such as the massacre of Atahualpa, led Manco Inca to believe that the Spaniards were "saviours" sent by the gods.

Túpac Huallpa was a puppet ruler crowned by Francisco Pizarro. After his death, Manco Inca joined Francisco Pizarro and Diego de Almagro in Cajamarca. When Pizarro's forces arrived in Cusco, he had the caciques acknowledge Manco as their Inca. Manco Inca then joined Almagro and Hernando de Soto in pursuit of Quizquiz.

When Pizarro left Cuzco with Almagro and Manco Inca, for Jauja in pursuit of Quizquiz, Francisco left his younger brothers Gonzalo Pizarro and Juan Pizarro as regidores, and a ninety-man garrison in the city.

The Pizarro brothers so mistreated Manco Inca that he ultimately tried to escape in 1535. He failed, was captured and imprisoned. Hernando Pizarro released him to recover a golden statue of his father, Huayna Cápac. Only accompanied by two Spaniards, he easily escaped a second time. Manco then gathered an army of 200,000 Inca warriors and laid siege to Cusco in early 1536, taking advantage of Diego de Almagro's absence. Manco called on other Inca to join him in his attack on the Spaniards, but some factions, including Paullu Inca's, refused to join the attack.

After ten months (see the siege of Cuzco), Manco retreated to the nearby fortress of Ollantaytambo in 1537. Here, Manco successfully defended attacks by the Spaniards in the battle of Ollantaytambo in January 1537.

Manco coordinated his siege of Cusco with one on Lima, led by one of his captains, Quiso Yupanqui. The Incas were able to defeat four relief expeditions sent by Francisco Pizarro from Lima. This resulted in the death of nearly 500 Spanish soldiers. Some Spaniards were captured and sent to Ollantaytambo.

Alonso de Alvarado was sent by Pizarro to Cusco, but upon his arrival at Abancay, he and his army were captured by Rodrigo Orgóñez in the Battle of Abancay. This was the beginning of the first civil war between the conquistadors.

Abandoning Ollantaytambo (and effectively giving up the highlands of the empire), Manco Inca retreated to Vitcos and finally to the remote jungles of Vilcabamba, where he founded the Neo-Inca State which lasted until the death of Túpac Amaru in 1572. From there, he continued his attacks against the Wankas (one of the most important allies of the Spaniards), having some success after fierce battles, and to the highlands of present-day Bolivia, where, after many battles, his army was defeated.

The Spaniards crowned his younger half-brother Paullu Inca as puppet Sapa Inca after his retreat for his valuable help in that last campaign. The Spanish succeeded in capturing Manco's sister-wife, Cura Ocllo; Gonzalo Pizarro raped her and kept her at his palace in Casana. The Spaniards had her murdered in 1539.

=== Death ===
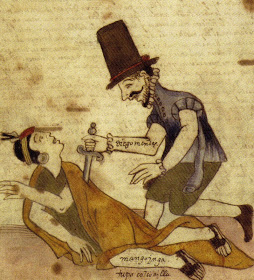
Diego Méndez murders Manco Inca, drawing made by the chronicler Martín de Murúa.

After many guerrilla battles in the mountainous regions of Vilcabamba, Manco was murdered in 1544 in the Inca centre of Vitcos by supporters of Diego de Almagro, who had previously assassinated Francisco Pizarro and who were in hiding under Manco's protection. They, in turn, were all killed by Manco's soldiers.

Manco was succeeded by his son Sayri Tupaq. Manco Inca had several sons, including Sayri Tupaq, Titu Cusi, and Túpac Amaru.

Manco's body was preserved at Vilcabamba in a Temple of the Sun.

== See also ==
- History of Cusco
- Spanish conquest of Peru
- Túpac Amaru

Regnal titles
Preceded by Túpac Huallpa	Sapa Inca (as installed by the Spaniards); 1533–1537	Succeeded by Paullu Inca
Preceded by None	Sapa Inca (as ruler of the Neo-Inca State); 1537–1544	Succeeded by Sayri Túpac
