= Sapa Inca =

Emperor of the Inca Empire

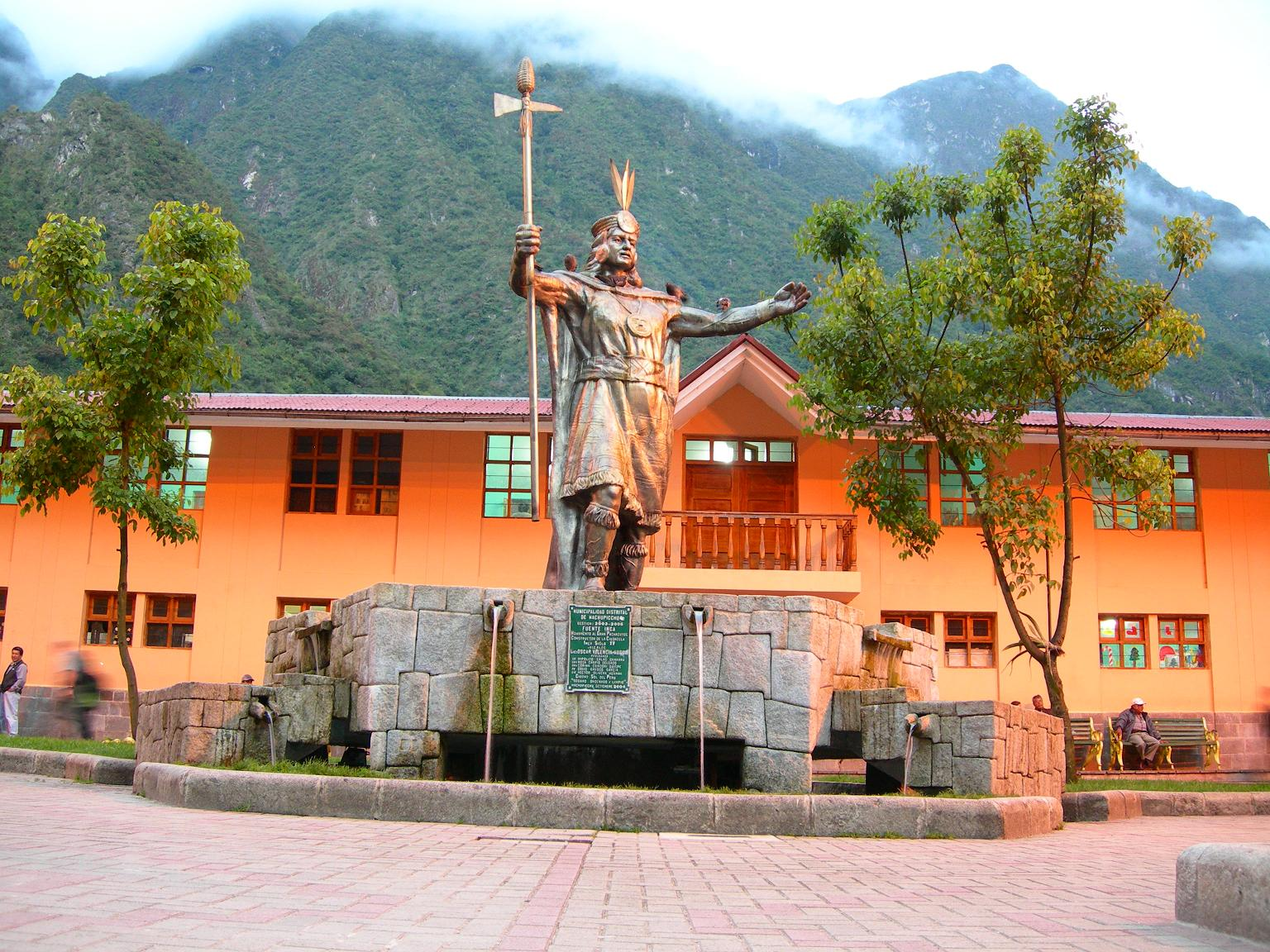
Statue of the Sapa Inca Pachacuti wearing the Mascapaicha (imperial crown), in the main square of Aguas Calientes, Peru

The Sapa Inca (from Quechua: sapa inka; lit. 'the only emperor') was the monarch of the Inca Empire (Tawantinsuyu "the region of the four [provinces]"), as well as ruler of the earlier Kingdom of Cusco and the later Neo-Inca State at Vilcabamba. While the origins of the position are mythical and originate from the legendary foundation of the city of Cusco, it seems to have come into being historically around AD 1100. Although the Inca believed the Sapa Inca to be the son of Inti (the sun god) and often referred to him as Inti churi "solar son" or Intip churin "son of the sun", the position eventually became hereditary, with son succeeding father. The principal wife of the Inca was known as the coya or quya. The Sapa Inca was at the top of the social hierarchy and played a dominant role in the political and spiritual realm.

Manco Capac, the first Inca monarch, adopted the title capac or qhapaq (roughly translated as "king"). Inca Roca, the sixth Inca monarch, was evidently the first to bear the title sapa Inca ("emperor") officially.

There were two known dynasties, led by the Hurin and Hanan moieties respectively. The latter was in power at the time of Spanish conquest. The last effective Sapa Inca of Inca Empire was Atahualpa, who was executed by Francisco Pizarro and his conquistadors in 1533, but several successors later claimed the title.

Other terms for sapa Inca include apu ("lord"), qhapaq Inka ("mighty Inca") or simply sapa ("the only one").

== Choosing the Inca ==
Chronicles identify the Inca as the highest ruler equivalent to European kings of the Middle Ages. However, the original access to that position was not linked to the inheritance of the eldest son, as is for a monarchy, but to the perceived selection of the gods by means of rigorous challenges, to which the physical and moral aptitudes of the aspirant were tested. These trials were accompanied by a complex spiritual ritual through which the Sun god, Inti nominated the one who should assume the Inca position. Eventually, with the passage of time, Incas named their favorite son as co-governor with the intention of securing his succession, for example, Huiracocha Inca associated Inca Urco to the throne. The coya, or sapa Inca's primary wife, had significant influence upon making this decision of which son is apt to succeed his father.

== Functions ==
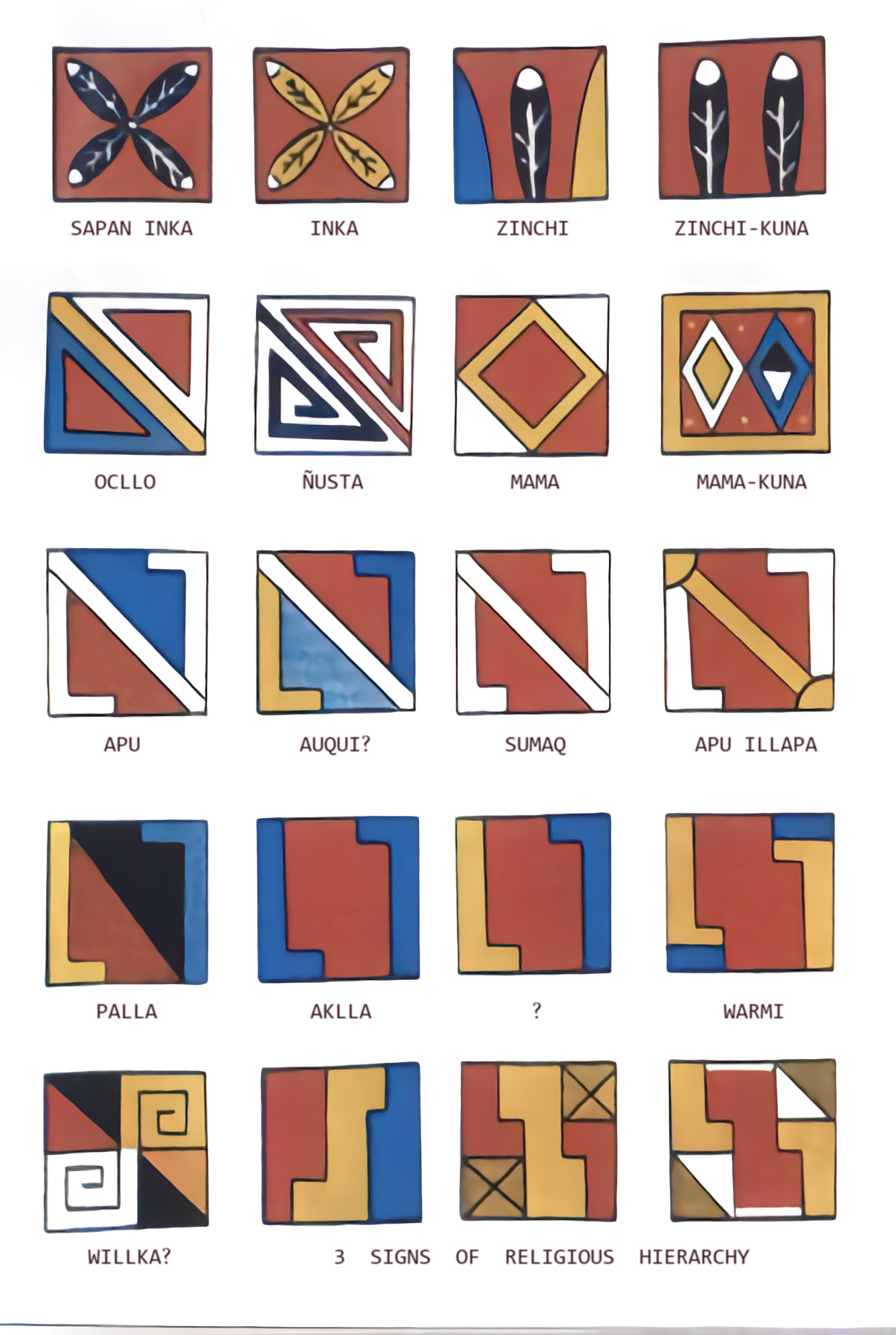
Tocapu or symbolic motif thought by Victoria de La Jara to represent the meaning of Sapa Inca (first row, first from the left).

The Sapa Inca was the absolute ruler of the empire and accumulated in his power the political, social, military, and economic direction of the state. He ordered and directed the construction of great engineering works, such as Sacsayhuamán, a fortress that took 50 years to complete; or the urban plan of the cities. However, among their most notable works, was the network of roads that crossed the entire empire and allowed a rapid journey for the administrators, messengers, and armies provided with hanging bridges and tambos. They made sure to always be supplied and well cared for, as is reflected in the construction of storehouses scattered throughout the empire and vast food and resource redistribution systems. The commander and chief of the standing army founded military colonies to expand the culture and control, while simultaneously ensuring the preservation of that network.

At the religious level, they were symbolic of the sun and promoted the worship of Inti, who was regarded as their ancestral father, and organized the calendar. At the political level, they sent inspectors to oversee the loyalty and efficiency of civil servants and collect tribute from the subjugated peoples. The emperors promoted a unified and decentralized government in which Cuzco acted as the articulating axis of the different regions or suyu. They appointed highly trusted governors. At the economic level, they decided how much each province should pay according to its resources. They knew how to win over the kuraka to ensure control of the communities. These were the intermediaries through whom they collected taxes.

Traditionally, every time an emperor died or resigned, his successor was disinherited from his father's inheritance and formed his own lineage royal clan or panaka, his father's lands, houses and servants were passed to his other children remaining on the previous panaka. The new Sapa Inca had to obtain land and spoils to bequeath to his own descendants. Each time they subdued a people, they demanded that the defeated leader surrender part of their land to continue in command, and whose people pay tribute in the form of labor (mit'a) and taxes.

The Sapa Inca also played a major role in caring for the poor and hungry, hence his other title huacchacoya or waqcha khuyaq "lover and benefactor of the poor". The Sapa was responsible for organizing food redistribution in times of environmental disaster, allocated work via state-sponsored projects, and most notably promoted major state-sponsored religious feasts that followed each successful harvest season.

== Distinction symbols ==
The Inca was divinized both in their actions and their emblems. In public he carried the topayauri ("scepter"), ushno (golden throne), suntur páucar (feathered pike), and the mascapaicha (royal insignia) commonly carried in a llauto (headband), otherwise, the mascapaicha could also be carried on an amachana chuku (military helmet). In religious ceremonies he was accompanied by the sacred white flame, the napa, covered with a red blanket and adorned with gold earrings. With textiles representing a form of status and wealth, it has been speculated that the Sapa Inca never wore the same clothes twice. The community even revered the Sapa after his death, mummifying him and frequently visiting his tomb to "consult" him on pressing affairs.

== Pre-Conquest Sapa Incas ==
=== First dynasty ===
Little is known of the rulers of the first dynasty of Sapa Incas. Evidently, they were affiliated with the Hurin moiety and their rule did not extend beyond the Kingdom of Cusco. Their origins are tied to the mythical establishment of Cusco and are shrouded in the later foundation myth. The dynasty was supposedly founded by Manco Cápac, who is considered the son of the sun god Inti in Inca mythology.

Title	Sapa Inca	Picture	Birth	Queen	Death
Inca of Cusco	Manco Capac (Manqu Qhapaq) c. 1200–1230		Considered the son of the sun god Inti	Mama Ocllo (Mama Uqllu) or Mama Waqu	c. 1230
Inca of Cusco	Sinchi Roca (Sinchi Ruq'a) c. 1230–1260		Son of Manco Cápac	Mama Cora (Mama Qura)	c. 1260
Inca of Cusco	Lloque Yupanqui (Lluq'i Yupanki) c. 1260–1290		Son of Sinchi Roca	Mama Cahua (Mama Qawa)	c. 1290
Inca of Cusco	Mayta Capac (Mayta Qhapaq) c. 1290–1320		Son of Lloque Yupanqui	Mama Takukaray	c. 1320
Inca of Cusco	Capac Yupanqui (Qhapaq Yupanki) c. 1320–1350		Son of Mayta Cápac	Mama Chimpu Qurihillpay	c. 1350

As a rough guide to the later reputation of the early Sapa Incas, in later years capac meant warlord and sinchi meant leader.

=== Second dynasty ===
The second dynasty was affiliated with the Hanan moiety and was founded under Inca Roca, the son of the last Hurin Sapa Inca, Cápac Yupanqui. After Cápac Yupanqui's death, another of his sons, Inca Roca's half-brother Quispe Yupanqui, was intended to succeed him. However, the Hanan revolted and installed Inca Roca instead.

Title	Sapa Inca	Picture	Birth	Queen	Death
Inca of Cusco	Inca Roca (Inka Ruqa) c. 1350–1380		Son of Cápac Yupanqui	Mama Mikay	c. 1380
Inca of Cusco	Yahuar Huacac (Yawar Waqaq) c. 1380–1410		Son of Inca Roca	Mama Chikya	c. 1410
Inca of Cusco	Viracocha (Wiraqucha Inka) c. 1410–1438		Son of Yáhuar Huácac	Mama Runtu Quya	1438
Inca of Cusco	Pachacuti (Pachakuti); 1438–1471		Son of Viracocha	Mama Anawarkhi	1471
Inca of Cusco	Topa Inca Yupanqui (Thupa Inka Yupanki); 1471–1493		Son of Pachacuti	Mama Ocllo Coya (Mama Uqllu Quya)	1493
Inca of Cusco	Huayna Capac (Wayna Qhapaq); 1493–1527		Son of Túpac Inca Yupanqui	Cusirimay (Kusi Rimay) Rahua Ocllo (Rawa Uqllu)	1527
Inca of Cusco	Huascar (Waskhar); 1527–1532		Son of Huayna Capac	Chuqui Huipa	1533; Killed by Atahualpa's agents.
Inca of Cusco	Atahualpa (Ataw Wallpa); 1532–1533		Son of Huayna Capac	Asarpay (Asarpay)	26 July 1533; Killed by the conquistadors.

Ninan Cuyochi, who was Inca for only a few days in 1527, is sometimes left off the list of Sapa Incas because news of his death from smallpox arrived in Cusco very shortly after he was declared Sapa Inca. He had witnessed the death of his father Huayna Cápac. The death of Ninan, the presumed heir, led to the Inca Civil War between Huáscar and Atahualpa, a weakness that the conquistadors exploited when they conquered the Inca Empire.

== Post-Conquest Sapa Incas ==
Title	Sapa Inca	Picture	Birth	Death	Notes
Inca of Incas	Túpac Huallpa (Tupa Wallpa); 1533		Son of Huayna Capac	1533	Installed by Francisco Pizarro.
Inca of Incas	Manco Inca Yupanqui (Manqu Inka Yupanki); 1533–1544		Son of Huayna Capac	1544	Installed by Francisco Pizarro. Led a revolt against the Spanish in 1536; after his defeat, established the Neo-Inca State in Vilcabamba before being killed by Almagristas.
Inca of Incas	Paullu Inca (Pawllu Inka); 1536–1549		Son of Huayna Capac	1549	Installed by the Spanish after Manco Inca rebelled; ruled in Cuzco.
Inca of Vilcabamba	Sayri Túpac (Sayri Tupa); 1544–1560		Son of Manco Inca Yupanqui	1560	Ruled in Vilcabamba.
Inca of Vilcabamba	Titu Cusi (T'itu Kusi); 1563–1571		Son of Manco Inca Yupanqui	1571	Ruled in Vilcabamba.
Inca of Vilcabamba	Túpac Amaru (Tupa Amaru); 1571–1572		Son of Manco Inca Yupanqui	24 September 1572; Executed by the Spanish	Ruled in Vilcabamba. The last Sapa Inca.

This last Sapa Inca must not be confused with Túpac Amaru II, who was leader of an 18th-century Peruvian uprising.

=== Family tree ===
DYNASTY OF THE Sapa Inca
First Dynasty
Manco Cápac; 1st Sapa Inca of Cusco (c. 1200–1230)	Mama Uqllu
Sinchi Roca; 2nd Sapa Inca of Cusco (c. 1230–1260)	Mama Qura
Lloque Yupanqui; 3rd Sapa Inca of Cusco (c. 1260–1290)	Mama Qawa
Mayta Cápac; 4th Sapa Inca of Cusco (c. 1290–1320)	Mama Takukaray
Cunti Mayta high priest	Cápac Yupanqui; 5th Sapa Inca of Cusco (c. 1320–1350)	Mama Chimpu Qurihillpay	Cusi Chimbo
Quispe Yupanqui heir apparent to 1350	Inca Roca; 6th Sapa Inca of Cusco (c. 1350 – c. 1380) younger son of Cápac Yupanqui chosen Sapa Inca when the Hanan moiety rebelled against the Hurin moiety	Mama Mikay
Second Dynasty
Apu Mayta a nephew & great warrior	Yáhuar Huácac; 7th Sapa Inca of Cusco (c. 1380 – c. 1410)	Mama Chikya	Inca Paucar	Huaman Taysi Inca	Vicaquirau Inca a great warrior
Viracocha; 8th Sapa Inca of Cusco (c. 1410–1438)	Mama Runtucaya	Ccuri-chulpa
Inca Rocca heir apparent	Tupac Yupanqui	Cusi Inca Yupanqui; Pachacuti; 9th Sapa Inca of Cusco; 1st Emperor of Inca Empire (1438–1471)	Mama Anahuarqui	Ccapac Yupanqui	Inca Urco	Inca Socso
Tupac Ayar Manco	Apu Paucar	Tupac Inca Yupanqui; 10th Sapa Inca of Cusco; 2nd Emperor of Inca Empire (c. 1441 – c. 1493)	Mama Ocllo
Queen Kusi Rimay	Titu Cusi Hualpa; Huayna Capac; 11th Sapa Inca of Cusco; 3rd Emperor of Inca Empire (c.1468–1524, probably of smallpox)	Rahua Ocllo	Auqui Tupac Inca d. 1524 w/his brother and nephew, prob. of smallpox	90 illegitimate sons and daughters, incl. Ccapac Huari, who tried to succeed his father
Ninan Cuyochi; Crown Prince (1490–1527) d. w/his father and uncle, probably of smallpox	Tupac Cusi Hualpa; Huáscar; 12th Sapa Inca of Cusco; 4th Emperor of Inca Empire (1491–1532)	Chuqui Huipa	Atahualpa; 13th Sapa Inca of Cusco; 5th Emperor of Inca Empire (c. 1502 – 26 July 1533)	Coya Asarpay (died 1533)	Túpac Huallpa; 14th Sapa Inca of Cusco; 6th Emperor of Inca Empire (installed by Pizarro 1533)	Manco Inca Yupanqui; 15th Sapa Inca of Cusco; 7th Emperor of Inca Empire; 1st Ruler of Neo-Inca State (1533 – revolted 1536 – 1544)	Paullu Inca; 16th Sapa Inca of Cusco; 8th Emperor of Inca Empire (installed by Pizarro 1536–1549)	Atoc, Konono, Wanka Auqui, Kizu Yupanqui, Tito Atauchi, Waman Wallpa, Kusi Wallpa, Tilka Yupanqu, & +
Sayri Túpac; 17th Sapa Inca; 2nd Ruler of Neo-Inca State (c. 1535–1561)	Titu Cusi; 18th Sapa Inca; 2nd Ruler of Neo-Inca State (1529–1571)	Túpac Amaru; 19th & last Sapa Inca; 3rd Ruler of Neo-Inca State (1545 – 24 September 1572)	descendants, incl son Carlos Inca, his son Melchor Carlos Inca, and his son Juan Melchor Carlos Inca

== See also ==
- Mallku
- Ñusta
- Lonko
- Toki
- The Legend of the Last Inca
