= Huayna Capac =

11th Incan emperor (r. 1493–1527)

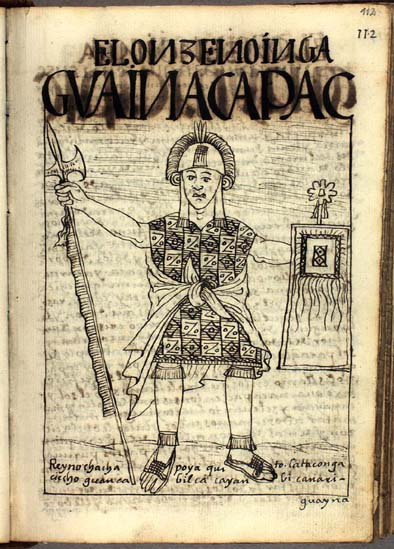
- Huayna Capac drawn by Felipe Guaman Poma de Ayala. The title, in Poma de Ayala's original spelling, reads: El onzeno inga Guaina Capac, "The eleventh Inca, Huayna Capac".

Sapa Inca of the Inca Empire
- Reign: 1493 – 1527
- Predecessor: Topa Inca Yupanqui
- Successor: Huáscar; Ninan Cuyochi (titular)
- Born: before 1487
- Died: 1527; Tumipampa, Inca Empire
- Consort: Kuya Kusi Rimay, Kuya Rawa Ukllu
- Issue: Ninan Cuyochi, Huáscar, Atahualpa, Túpac Huallpa, Manco Inca Yupanqui, Atoc, Paullu Inca, Quispe Sisa, Coya Asarpay, Konono, and others
- Inca: Runa Simi, Qhapaq Simi
- House: Tumipampa Ayllu
- Dynasty: Hanan Qusqu
- Father: Túpac Inca Yupanqui
- Mother: Kuya Mama Ukllu

Huayna Capac (/ˈwaɪnə ˈkæpæk/ WY-nə KAP-ak; Cusco Quechua: Wayna Qhapaq [ˈwajna ˈqʰapaχ] – lit. 'the young generous one'; Spanish: [ˈwajna ˈkapak]; before 1493 – 1527) was the eleventh Sapa Inca of Tawantinsuyu, the Inca Empire. He was the son of and successor to Túpac Inca Yupanqui, the sixth Sapa Inca of the Hanan dynasty, and eleventh of the Inca civilization. He was born in Tumipampa and tutored to become Sapa Inca from a young age.

Tawantinsuyu reached its greatest extent under Huayna Capac, as he expanded the empire's borders south along the Chilean coast, and north through what is now Ecuador and southern Colombia. According to the priest Juan de Velasco he absorbed the Quito Confederation into his empire by marrying Queen Paccha Duchicela, halting a long protracted war. Huayna Capac founded the city Atuntaqui and developed the city Cochabamba as an agriculture and administrative center. The Sapa Inca greatly expanded the Inca road system and had many qullqa (storehouses) built.

Huayna Capac died in 1527, possibly from a European disease introduced to the Americas by the Spaniards. The death of him and his eldest son Ninan Cuyochi sparked the Inca Civil War, in which his sons Huáscar and Atahualpa fought over succession as the next Sapa Inca. Tawantinsuyu fell to Spanish conquests shortly after Atahualpa's victory.

== Names ==
Huayna Capac's original name was Tito Cusi Huallpa (Hispanicized spelling) T'itu Kuši Wallpa (reconstructed Classical Quechua) before ascending to Sapa Inca. Huayna Capac has many alternative transliterations, among the most popular ⟨Huaina Capac⟩, ⟨Guaina Capac⟩, ⟨Wayna Qhapaq⟩, and many others. The name comes from Quechua wayna "young" and qhapaq "mighty, powerful", thusly "the young mighty one", and not the other way around *"the mighty young one".

Subjects commonly approached Sapa Incas adding epithets and titles when addressing them, such as Wayna Qhapaq Inka Sapʼalla Tukuy Llaqta Uya "unique sovereign Huayna Capac, listener to all peoples".

== Background and family ==
The exact place and date of Huayna Capac's birth are unknown. Though he was raised in Cuzco, he may have been born in 1468 in Tumebamba (modern Cuenca) and have spent part of his childhood there. He was the son of Túpac Inca Yupanqui (ruled 1471–1493) who had extended Inca rule north into present-day Ecuador, a process continued by Huayna Capac.

Huayna Capac's first wife was his full sister, the Quya or Queen Consort Coya Cusirimay. The couple produced no male heirs, but Huayna Capac sired more than 50 legitimate sons, and about 200 illegitimate children with other women. Huayna Capac took another sister, Araua Ocllo, as his royal wife. They had a son they named Thupaq Kusi Wallpa, later known as Huáscar.

Other sons included Ninan Cuyuchi (the Crown Prince), Atahualpa, Túpac Huallpa, Manco Inca, Paullu Inca, Atoc, Konono, Wanka Auqui, Kizu Yupanqui, Tito Atauchi, Waman Wallpa, Kusi Wallpa, Tilka Yupanqu. Some of them later held the title of Sapa Inca, although some later Sapa Inca were installed by the Spaniards.

Among the daughters of Huayna Capac there were Coya Asarpay (the First Princess of the Empire), Quispe Sisa, Cura Ocllo, Marca Chimbo, Pachacuti Yamqui, Miro, Cusi Huarcay, Francisca Coya and others.

In addition to Kusi Rimay and Rawa Uqllu, Huayna Capac had more than 50 wives including Usika, Lari, Anawarqi, Kuntarwachu and Añas Qulqi.^{:143}

== Administration ==
Tawantinsuyu or Inca empire at its peak under Huayna Capac.

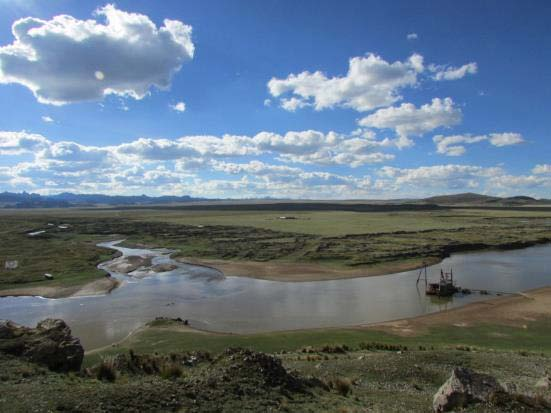
Ruins of the Inca city of Pumpu. Huayna Capac used to spend time relaxing in the nearby Chinchay Cocha lake connected to the city by a river.

As a "boy chief" or "boy sovereign", Huayna Capac had a tutor, Wallpaya,^{:218} a nephew of Túpac Inca Yupanqui. This tutor's plot to assume the Incaship was discovered by his uncle, the Governor Waman Achachi, who had Wallpaya killed.

In the south, Huayna Capac continued the expansion of Tawantinsuyu into what is now Chile and Argentina and tried to annex territories towards the north in what is now Ecuador and southern Colombia.

According to the Ecuadorian priest Juan de Velasco Huayna Capac absorbed the kingdom of Quito into the Inca Empire. He supposedly married Paccha Duchicela, the queen of Quito.

Huayna Capac became fond of Ecuador and spent most of his time there, founding cities like Atuntaqui. Huayna Capac rebuilt Quito to make it the "second capital" of the empire, besides Cusco.

As Sapa Inca, he built astronomical observatories in Ecuador such as Ingapirca. Huayna Capac hoped to establish a northern stronghold in the city of Tumebamba, inhabited by the Cañari people. In the Sacred Valley, the sparse remains of one of Huayna Capac's estates and his country palace called Kispiwanka can still be found in the present-day town of Urubamba, Peru.

In what is now Bolivia, Huayna Capac was responsible for developing Cochabamba as an important agriculture and administrative center, with more than two thousand silos (qullqas) for corn storage built in the area. Further north in Ecuador, Huayna Capac's forces attempted to expand into the lowlands of the Amazon basin, reaching the Chinchipe River, but they were pushed back by the Shuar.

Huayna Capac acquired a special fondness for the central Peruvian Andes and its local highlights; he is recorded as having spent time relaxing in the Chinchaycocha lake on the Bombon plateau. Many Inca rafts were brought to the lake directly from Ecuador for his amusement. On its way to Cusco, after Huayna Capac's death in Quito, the procession carrying his body stopped in the vicinity of Shawsha, a city in the central Peruvian Andes, acknowledging the fondness that he had felt for the region, and because the local inhabitants had been some of the most loyal to its causes.

Tawantinsuyu, or the Inca Empire, reached the height of its size and power under his rule, stretching over much of what is now Bolivia, Peru, Argentina, Chile, Ecuador, and southwestern Colombia. It included varying terrain from high frozen Andes to the densest swamps. His subjects spanned more than two hundred distinct ethnic groups, each with their own customs and languages. The empire spanned 3,500 kilometres (2,200 mi) north to south, comprising the desert coast of Pacific Ocean on the west, the high Andes in the southeast and the forests of the Amazon Basin on the east. A dedicated ruler, Huayna Capac did much to improve the lives of his people. In addition to building temples and other works, Huayna Capac greatly expanded the road network. He had qollqa built along it for food so that aid could be quickly rushed to any who were in danger of starvation.

Huayna Capac knew of the Spanish arrival off the coast of his empire as early as 1515.

== Death and legacy ==
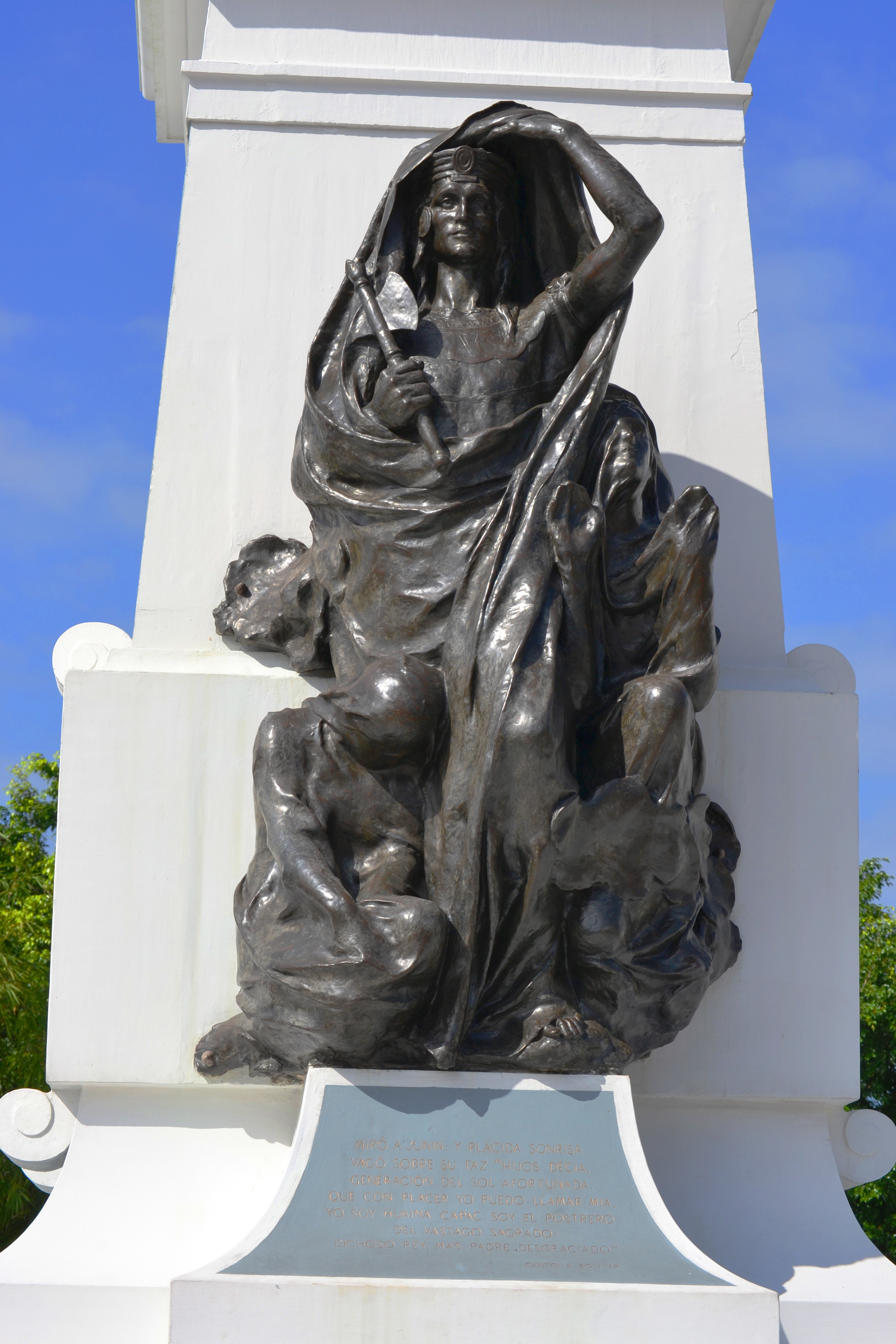
Statue of Huayna Capac in Guayaquil

Huayna Capac died in 1527. When Huayna Capac returned to Quito he had already contracted a fever while campaigning in present-day Colombia (though some historians dispute this), which might've resulted from the introduction of European disease like measles or smallpox. The Spaniards had carried a wide variety of deadly diseases to North, Central and South America; and the Indigenous peoples had no acquired immunity against them. Millions of Central- and South Americans died in such epidemics and possibly including Huayna's brother, Auqui Tupac Inca, and Huayna's would-be successor and eldest son, Ninan Cuyochi. The claim that smallpox caused Huayna's death has been disputed by other historians, with the earliest accounts of Huayna Capac being vague or not agreeing on what illness he had and none of the descriptions of his mummy describing pockmarks that is associated with getting smallpox.

According to some sources, his sons Atahualpa and Huáscar were granted two separate realms of Tawantinsuyu: to his favorite Atahualpa the northern portion centered on Quito; and Huáscar the southern portion centered on Cusco. According to other sources, Atuahualpa was acting as provincial governor on behalf of his brother. The two sons reigned peacefully for four to five years before Huáscar (or possibly Atahualpa) decided to grab power.

Huáscar quickly secured power in Cusco and had his brother arrested. However, Atahualpa escaped from his imprisonment with the help of his wife. Atahualpa began securing support from Huayna Capac's best generals, Chalcuchíma and Quizquiz, who happened to be near Quito, the nearest major city. Atahualpa rebelled against his brother and won the ensuing civil war, imprisoning Huáscar at the end of the war. Huayna Capac's city of Tumebamba was destroyed during the war. The Spanish Francisco Pizarro and his men ascended into the Andes just as Atahualpa was returning to Cusco after the successful conclusion of his northern campaigns. After launching a surprise attack in Cajamarca and massacring upward of 6,000 Inca soldiers, Pizarro took Atahualpa prisoner. Pizarro's ransom of Atahualpa and his subsequent execution marked the immediate turning point of the Spanish conquest of Tawantinsuyu.

== Lost mummy ==
All the Inca emperors had their bodies mummified after death. Huayna Capac's mummy was housed in his palace in Cusco and was seen by the Spanish conquistadors. Later, it was taken from Cusco to his royal estate of Kispiwanka where it was hidden from the Spanish by Huayna Capac's relatives and servants. At some point it was taken back to Cusco, where it was discovered in 1559 by the Spanish. Along with mummies of 10 other Inca emperors and their wives, the mummy was taken to Lima where it was displayed in the San Andrés Hospital. The mummies deteriorated in the damp climate of Lima and eventually they were either buried or destroyed by the Spanish.

An attempt to find the mummies of the Inca emperors beneath the San Andrés Hospital in 2001 was unsuccessful. The archaeologists found a crypt, but it was empty. The mummies may have been removed when the building was repaired after an earthquake.

Regnal titles
Preceded by Topa Inca Yupanqui	Sapa Inca; 1493 – 1527	Succeeded by Huáscar
