= Battle of Huanucopampa =

1532 battle in South America

Atahualpa-Huáscar conflict
- Part of Inca Civil War
Date	Early 1532
Location	Wanuku Pampa plains, in present-day Peru
Result	Inconclusive, successful retreat by Huáscar's army
Territorial changes	Continued advance of Atahualpa forces

Belligerents
Atahualpans	Huáscarans

Commanders and leaders
Chalcuchimac; Quizquiz; Tomay Rima †	Huáscar; Uampa Yupanqui; Tito Atauchi; Topa Atao; Guanca Auqui; Agua Panti; Paca Yupanqui

Strength
Unknown	Unknown

Casualties and losses
Unknown, probably high	Unknown

The Battle of Huanucopampa was a 1532 battle in the Inca Civil War.

After the disastrous battle of Chimborazo, the expected victor of the war, Huáscar, had been deeply humiliated, his army routed and forced to withdraw to the south, shadowed by a contingent of the northerners sent by Atahualpa under the command of generals Chalcuchimac and Quizquiz, possibly as well Rumiñahui. Huáscar himself split his army along the border in three divisions, one main division commanded by Uampa Yupanqui with troops from Kuntisuyu and from the south, planning to cross the Cotabambas river. Another army was led by Guanca Auqui, Agua Panti, Paca Yupanqui and a third led by Huáscar himself (taking command personally for the first time) and his brothers Tito Atauchi and Topa Atao.

The armies met at the plains close to Huanuco, when Huáscar ordered Uampa Yupanqui to take battle with the followers. Initially the battle was reportedly successful for the Huáscaran troops, with Atahualpa's captain Tomay Rima killed in battle, upon when Huáscar launched a massive assault with all his soldiers. The battle allegedly lasted for an entire day and ended inconclusive, as Chalcuchima and Quizquiz pulled back upon night towards a hill nearby. Huáscar ordered his warriors to burn the grass, causing massive losses among the Atahualpan forces. Instead of pressing this attack, however, Huáscar chose to retreat safely to the south across the river, ordering his brother Topa Atao to fortify a pass carrying the main route to the nearby Inca capital of Cuzco. Once again followed by the army of Quizquiz and Chalcuchima, the latter managed to envelop and destroy the forces of Topa Atao. Permanently losing his possible outlets for advantage, Huáscar was himself defeated and captured at Quipaipan in April, 1532.
