= Topa Atao =

Commander during the Inca Civil War

Topa Atao was a brother and commander of Huascar's forces in the Inca Civil War. After defeat at Chimborazo and the initial success at halting Atahualpa's forces at Wanuku Pampa, he was ordered by the retreating Huascar to lead a force of recognition into a ravine upon the emerging armies of Chalkuchimac and Quizquiz. Chalkuchimac divided up his forces, attacking Topa Atao from several directions, capturing him and destroying the recognition force. His fate remains unknown. He was possibly gored in the head by zealous warriors who wanted to have his position.
