= Inca army =

Army of the historical Inca Empire

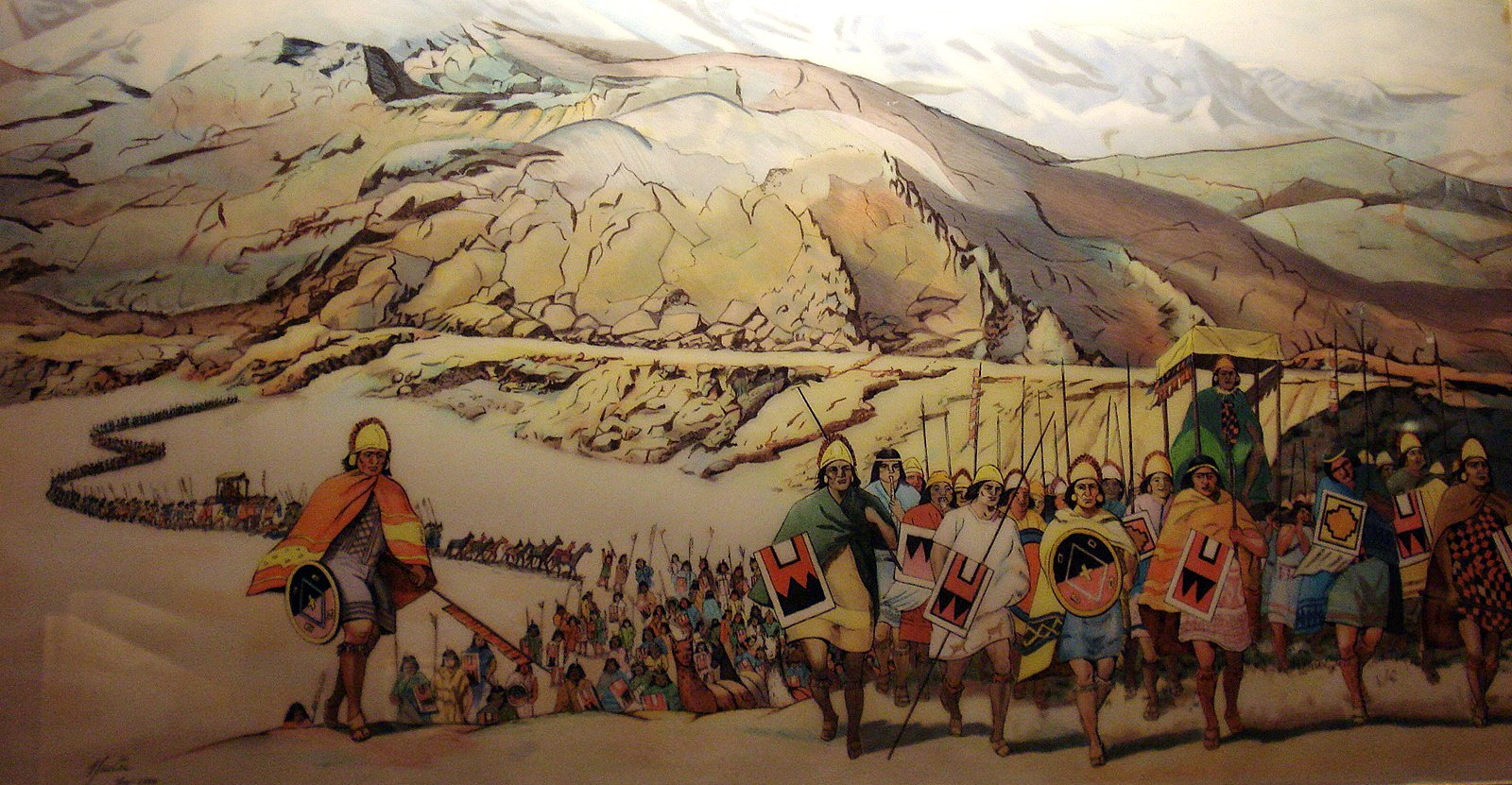
Idealized picture of the Inca Army. Brüning Museum, Lambayeque, Peru.

The Inca army (Quechua: Inka Awqaqkuna) was the multi-ethnic armed forces used by the Tawantin Suyu to expand its empire and defend the sovereignty of the Sapa Inca in its territory.

Thanks to the military mit'a, as the empire grew in size and population, so did the army, reaching 200,000 men in a single army (during the reign of Huayna Capac). The soldiers were provided with food, clothing and state aid in replacing their family in regard to the agrarian activity that the recruited should be fulfilling, in such a way that being a permanent soldier was not a bad position and even occupied its own space in the political-social pyramid.

During the Manco Inca rebellion, the soldiers used Spanish weapons and armor, and learned how to ride horses. After the retreat to Vilcabamba, they began to use guerrilla tactics against the Viceroyalty of Peru. The Inca army was finally dissolved after the death of the last Inca of Vilcabamba, Tupac Amaru I, in 1567.

== Composition ==
As the Inca Empire grew, an army created by a loose confederation of peasant warriors was replaced by one of professional officers. These officers were chosen during the Warachikuy festival, during which candidates had to undergo various tests of physical skill: such as racing, marksmanship, simulated combat and to see if they could stay awake for a long period, with it being reported that some officers could remain awake for a whole week.

Inca battalions contained permanent staff (generals and officers) and non-permanent personnel composed of drafted hatun runas (common men), who would be serving their military mit'a public service, comparable to mandatory military service or the draft. Once the mit'a was fulfilled, each hatun runa would return to their respective ayllu (community).

Each battalion was made up of a single ethnic group, the whole group being directed by a kuraka (warlord) of the same ethnicity. In the event that a kuraka fell in battle, a replacement was appointed from within the same ethnic group. To prevent rebellions and to promote successful performance in battle, two battalions were formed per ethnic group, each one under the command of a general (and both under the command of the kuraka). Promotion was given to the general who gave the greatest display of bravery on the battlefield, which led to competition between the two battalions. This concept of "duality" is widespread in the Andean world and represents the two Inca dynasties: Hanan and Hurin.

From the time of the rule of Emperor Tupac Yupanqui, a specialized elite group of soldiers was appointed for the safekeeping of the Sapa Inca ("the one and only Inca") during parades, travel or campaigns. These bodyguards originated primarily in Cusco, though soldiers from other ethnicities were also accepted in their ranks. This imperial guard, consisting entirely of men belonging to the nobility, reached a size of 10,000 warriors.

All members of the Inca Army were between 25 and 50 years old. All of the empire's citizens had to perform either military or community service. One in every 50 men over 25-years-old (the legal age of responsibility in the Inca Empire) would be chosen for military service. For noblemen, this was an honour and a duty, for common men, it was a means of social promotion. In accordance with the duality concept, one of every 50 young women was selected to serve in the Temple of the Virgins of the Sun.

Commoners were considered to have fulfilled their military service obligations after six or seven years. The professional officers, however, were permanent soldiers, paid by the state. This military caste enjoyed several privileges, with the state paying for their food, clothing and housing costs, as well as supplying gifts such as coca, jewellery, and wives.

Runas (common men) from the coastal region —in contrast to men from the highlands— were not compelled to serve in the army. This is probably explained by their poor adaptation to the harsh climate conditions of the highlands, where most wars took place.

Army units would march in the company of a large number of women, mostly relatives of the soldiers. Women would take care of cooking and repair the soldiers' clothes and, after battles, would attend the wounded and help bury the dead. Inca armies would not fight at night for religious reasons. A group of priests would also be attached to the army units, to pray, make sacrifices, and try to weaken the opposing force by casting spells before and during battle. Weapons and other equipment were transported by llamas.

In the early stages of the Inca Empire, the army was mainly formed of ethnic Inca troops. Later on, however, only the officers and imperial guards were Incas (the Incas were 40,000 to 100,000 strong, and they ruled an empire of 10 to 15 million). The squads were organized according to the ethnicity of the soldiers (auca runas). The soldiers were armed and dressed according to their tribe with animal skins, fabric shields, feathers, jewels or body paints.

Once a battle was over, enemy leaders would only be executed if they refused to accept the sovereignty of the Incas. The majority of conquered nations were absorbed into the Empire. Conquered nations were forced to adopt Quechua as their main language, worship Inca gods and adopt Inca social customs. Inca government officials would perform a careful study of the conquered zone to ensure the achievement of these objectives.

== Tactics ==
Before the battle began, each battalion paraded to arouse awe in the opposing army, with their banners and the commander carried in his litter carrying the symbol of his command. After that, the general in command would review the troops while musical instruments were played. After this, the commanding officer would rally the troops for the attack. The Sapa Inca himself would rally the troops in larger campaigns. For smaller rebellions, barbarian invasions, or small campaigns, a general or a prince would be sent as his representative.

=== Logistics and command ===
The Inca army's military effectiveness was based on two main elements: logistics and discipline. In order to facilitate the movement of their armies, the Incas built a vast road system. Staging areas were set along the roads so the troops and animals could rest and weapons could be obtained (Colcas). Discipline was very rigid. Soldiers weren't allowed to leave the formation, even during the course of a march. Troops would maintain silence, only breaking it just before battle by yelling and singing to intimidate the opposing force.

Army squads were organized in a series of lines. The front lines were initially occupied by slingers and archers, who would go to the rearguard of the formation after the initial barrages. The lines behind them were occupied by storm-troopers with clubs and axes, these were followed by short-spear bearers, and closing the formation were long-spear bearers (up to 6 meters long).

The Incas also built forts (Pukaras) where they stored weapons, food and reserve soldiers. These fortresses also controlled the main communication routes and were constructed in easily defensible locations such as in mountains, on the tops of hills or at the side of a river or road.

There was a reward system for distinguished services. Soldiers displaying bravery beyond expectations were rewarded with medals, metal weapons, uniforms and other objects.

=== Field tactics ===
During a battle on the open ground, the army would usually get divided into three groups. The main group would launch a frontal attack against the opposing force, while the other two would flank the enemy and circle around behind them to attack from the rear. Before the hand-to-hand combat would start, to break the enemy's lines the soldiers used ranged weapons (slings, arrows and short spears). The Inca army sometimes used to feign a retreat to be attacked while launching its own pincer attack.

The main advantage of the Inca army over its enemies was its numeric superiority. While typical adversaries were warriors from a single chiefdom (or at most, an alliance of several chiefdoms), the imperial troops were formed of men from all over the empire. Thanks to the large size of the empire, an army of hundreds of thousands of warriors could be mobilized. This wide variety of men would prove both an advantage (numerical superiority and specialized soldiers for different terrain) and a disadvantage (lack of cohesion between army battalions). Both Inca oral histories and Spanish written accounts estimate that the Incas could field armies of 100,000 at a time.

Most opponents of the Inca in the region were poorly organized and after breaking formation would perform mass frontal charges. The Inca army, by contrast, was so well disciplined that it very rarely broke formation and was able to effectively repel ambushes in the jungle, desert, mountain and swamp terrains.

=== Sieges ===
In the event that the opposing force would take refuge in a fortress, mountain, or city, the Inca forces would cut communication and supply lines to isolate the enemy and prevent retreat or requests for reinforcements. If negotiations failed, the Inca forces would attempt to storm the fortress and/or starve the opposing force.

Occupied cities and their inhabitants were usually well treated if they surrendered without resistance. If, however, the enemy did resist then they could suffer a number of punishments depending on the degree of resistance offered. If a city or tribe surrendered and then rebelled, the Inca could even authorize the complete annihilation of the city or ethnic group.

If retreat was necessary, the Inca army would usually march along roads in a disciplined way, following the quickest route available. The army would only rest in fortresses with the objective of rearming in case to make a counterattack. Garrisons would be left in the fortresses that controlled the roads to delay a possible advance by the enemy.

=== Scouting, diplomacy and colonization ===
The Incas usually sent scouts to watch their enemies. Groups of nobles were sent to negotiate treaties of peace and, on a number of occasions, the servants of these emissaries were spies that tried to bribe the enemy officers so that they would betray their kin by retreating during a crucial moment in the battle.

After the annexation and division of a conquered territory, settlers from other parts of the Tawantinsuyu were sent to reinforce the loyalty to the empire (Mitma) also to teach them new techniques of agriculture, metallurgy, etc.

== Military buildings ==
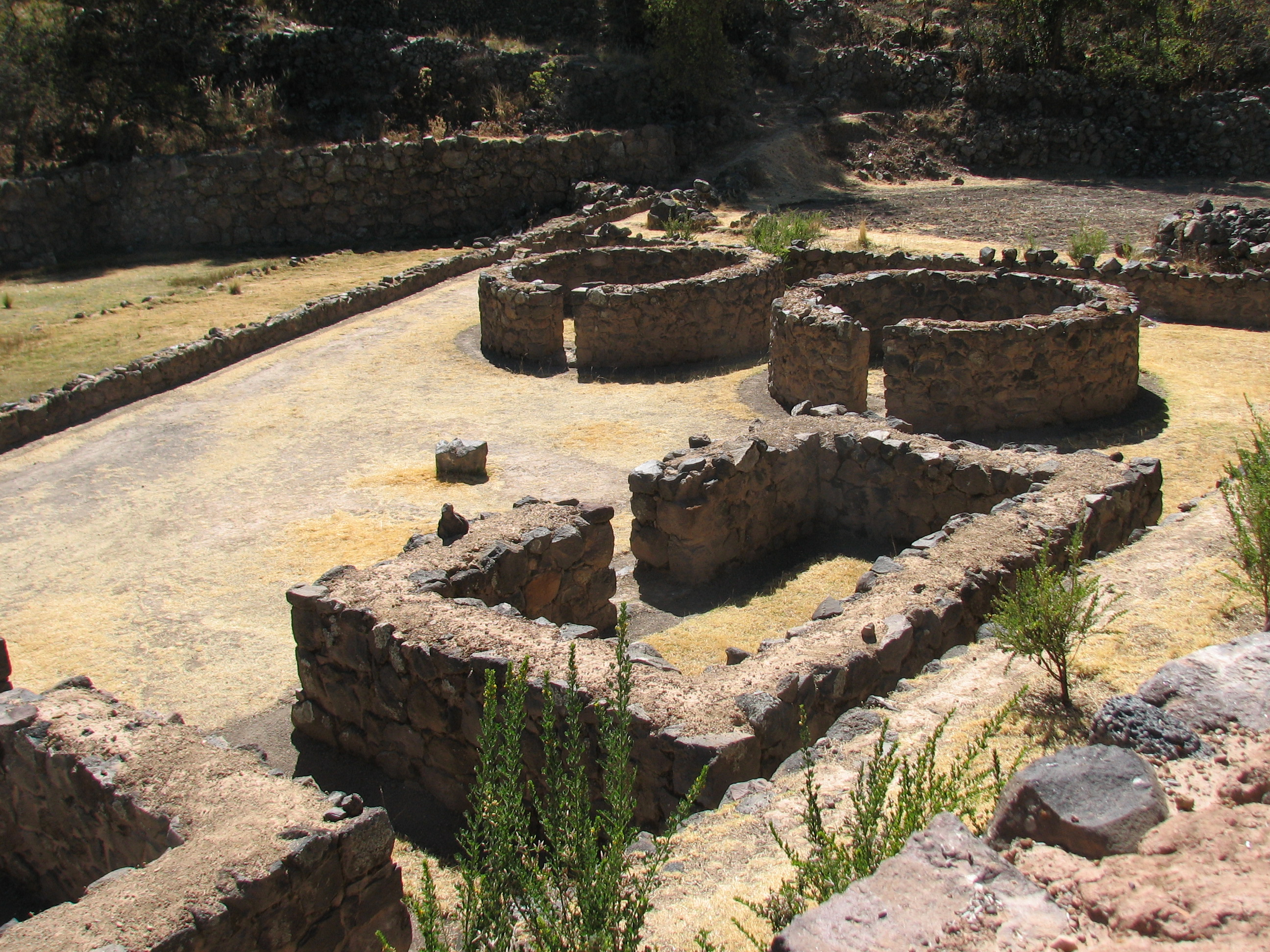
Qullqas at Raqch'i.

=== Colcas ===
The Colca (from quechua "Qullqa": "depot, storehouse".) was the storage building found along the Inca road system and at the villages and political centers of the Tawantinsuyu, this system guaranteed the survival of the empire and its people in years when harvests were poor, the goods were generally stored in ceramic vessels. Inka engineers understood the environment and built colcas to take advantage of natural airflow to keep stored items fresh.

The qullqas could be round or rectangular, the local population near the colcas centers had the obligation to supply these storehouses with food (like chuño) and other basic products, like weapons, that could be distributed to their armies, officers, conscripted workers and, in times of need, to the population (for example, droughts). Most important provincial centers could contain hundreds of colcas.

=== Kallankas ===
These were large rectangular enclosures, up to 70 meters (230 feet) long, associated with important state centers. The structures, mentioned as "barns" in the chronicles due to its size. Some main characteristics generally featured in the kallankas are: several doors, niches, windows, gables and gable roofs, elongated rectangular ground plan, interior usually without divisions (continuous space), presence of internal posts or columns to support the roof (in the case of large structures), several doors placed at intervals in one of the long walls that lead to a square. The size of these structures could be from 17 to 105 meters (56 to 344 feet), although a minimum size has been established of 40 meters (130 feet), being its best example the kallanka of Huchuy Qosqo.

Due to its importance as political or military administrative centers, several functions have been attributed to it such as: Headquarters or barracks for the soldiers of the empire, places of public meeting or assembly, palaces or lodgings for important individuals, or finally as a multi-role building (it had to be adapted to different purposes and situations).

=== Pukaras ===
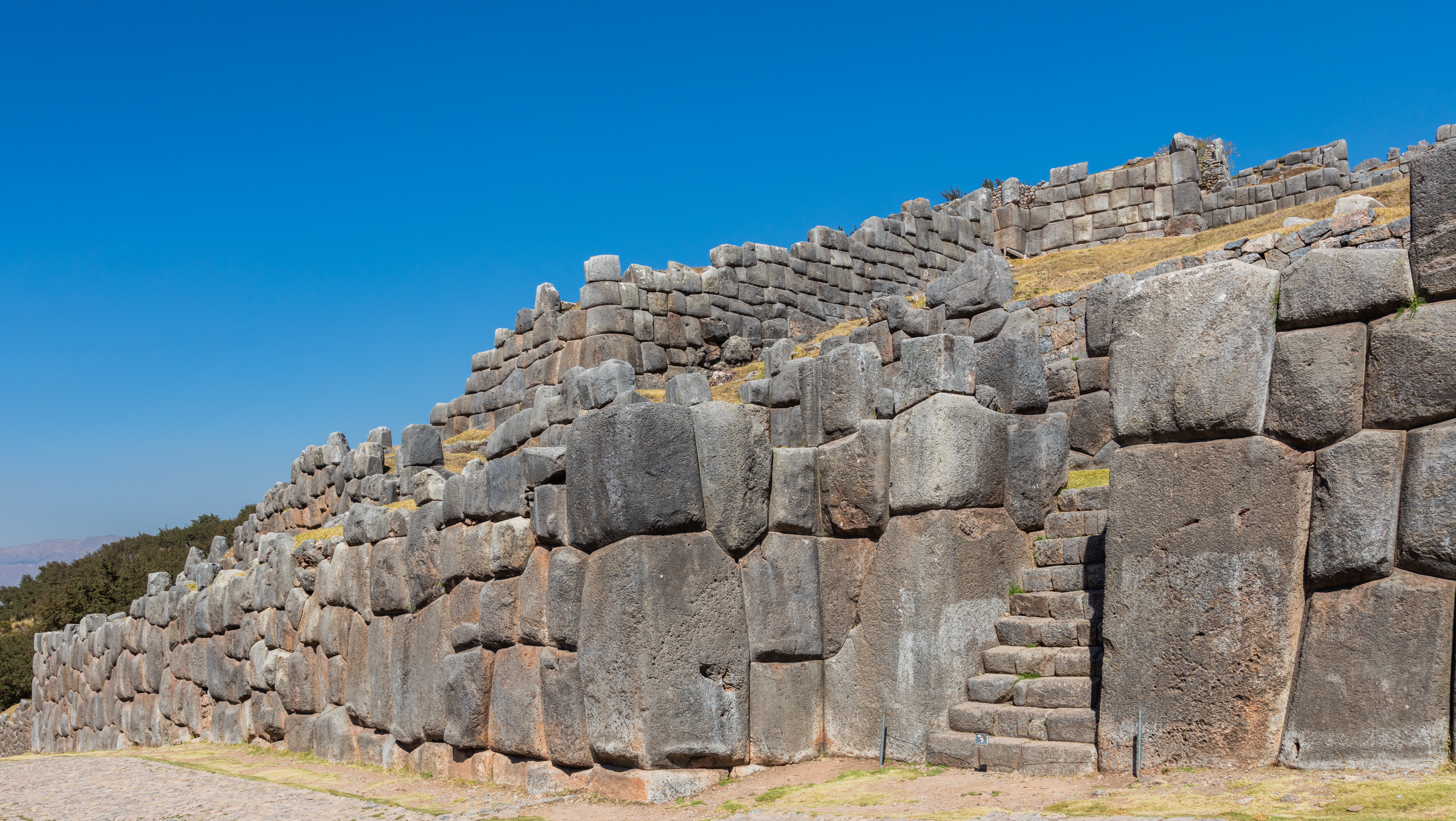
Picture of a Sacsaywaman's entrance with stairs, the importance of the Sacsayhuaman fortress is superior to Machu Picchu.

The Pukaras were the main military fortifications of the Incas, usually built in the limits of the empire and in conflict zones. With the exception of the great strongholds in the Cuzco area, the structure and layout of the Inca fortresses are surprisingly uniform, indicating that they were planned and constructed by a central authority. The pukaras were usually situated on hills; built on concentric terraces that spiraled up the hillside to surround a barracks complex. The size of the pukaras and their garrisons depended on their strategic importance. Sacsayhuaman, overlooking the capital, Cuzco, was of colossal proportions, and was probably the largest pukara in the empire.

The Inca pukaras were at strategic heights overlooking the main crossroads, important settlements, and tambos. Built individually or in groups of different sizes, depending on the importance of the place to be protected. The upper part of the retaining wall of the terraces had a stone parapet that protected the defenders from enemy projectiles (called "Pirqas", walls of rustic construction made of raw stone, with a maximum height of about 1.5–1.7 meters (4.9–5.6 feet) and a width of about one meter). Perforated entrances into the two-meter deep terrace walls allow access to each level of the Pukara. The hilltop complex was surrounded by its own wall, large pukaras could include a platform for a temple dedicated to the sun god Inti; turrets and small towers with stone gates that functioned as observatories, lodgings for the commander of the square, his troops and some priests and Colcas where food, clothing and armament for the garrison were kept, as well as several rooms. The commander of the pukara was usually a Rinriyuq (nobleman from Cuzco), the garrison was called Pukara kamayuqkuna: "Group of the pukara's guards".

Sometimes, instead of building one, the Inca army would just conquer one of the local enemy fortifications and renovate it, such as the Paramonga fortress.

=== Tambos ===
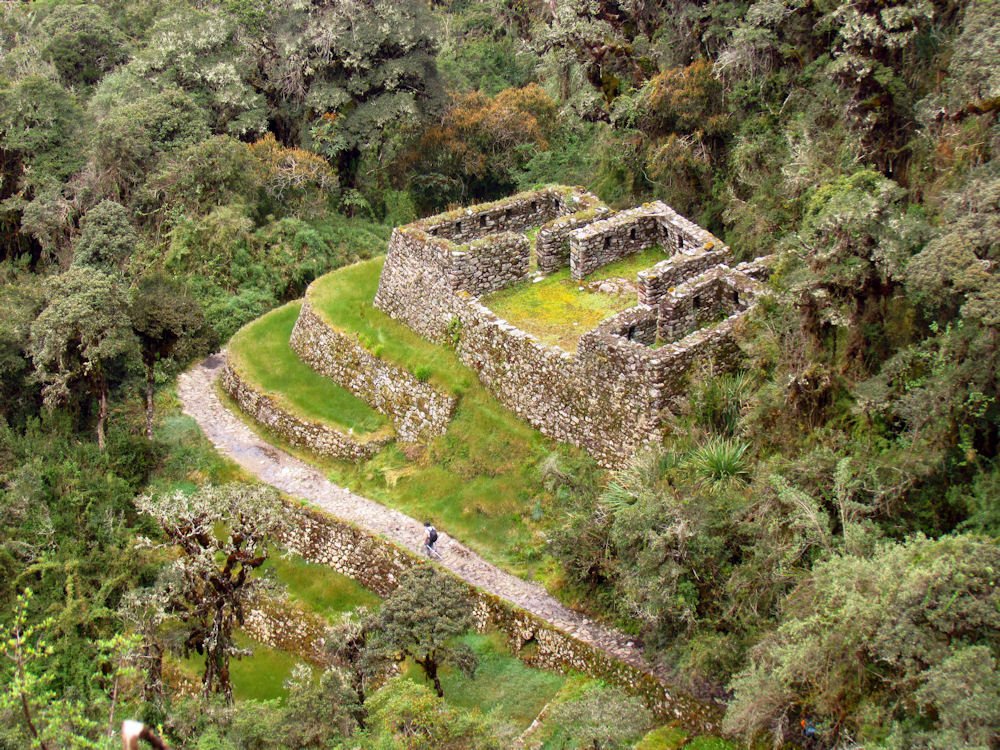
Qunchamarka tambo on the Inca Trail to Machu Picchu.

The tambo (from quechua "Tampu") was a building located next to a road used by travelling state personnel as a shelter and storage center for administrative and military purposes. Its importance consist in the fact that the tambos were the buildings with the greatest presence throughout the Inca Empire. The Inca trail (Qhapaq Ñan) had 20 or 30 km distant tambos (a journey on foot) from each other. Its main function was to house the chasquis (emissaries) and the Inca officials who traveled through these roads. There is no information on whether they housed ordinary men (hatun runas). People from nearby communities were recruited to serve in the tambos as part of the work system called mit'a.

These Tambos, were places of supply which served the chasquis as a shelter on their travels. They used a relay system to get the information to its destination. They began the journey near one tambo until they reached the next one, where another chasqui was found and he was in charge of carrying out the same task so on until they reached the destination of the message. It is known that they managed to make the route from Cusco to Quito in about a week.

The functions of the tambos also depended on their size and the equipment they contained. Each tambo had the capacity to house several state officials. For example, the smaller tambos served as stations for the chasquis, called "Chasquiwasi" (literally "House of the chasqui") of only one room and a small place to store supplies. Larger tambos could also provide other functions, like warehouses that could provide supplies and some accommodations for the moving armies. This function, however, should not be confused with the collcas, which were only warehouses from which the armies were resupplied when they passed.

== Structure ==
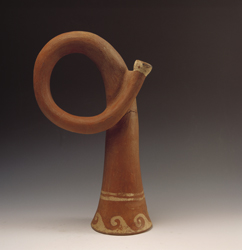
A ceramic trumpet or qiqiri from the coast, CE 300, Larco Museum Collection Lima, Peru. Most Andean military forces preferred the use of the pututu as an instrument.

The main difference between the Inca army and other pre-Columbian civilizations military forces was their organization; while most of them usually attacked in hordes or disorganized groups of specialized warriors, the imperial army had at their disposal a large number of soldiers (200,000 in a single field army). The army was organized on the decimal system, in units of ten, one hundred, one thousand, and so on. Pedro Cieza de León reveals that the military leadership had ten, fifty, one hundred, five hundred, one thousand, five thousand and ten thousand under their command. From this, it's understood that the organization scale would be a factor of 2 and then of 5. However, this can be interpreted as a decimal scale organization, as mentioned before, with two sub-leaders below that would compete for the higher position. This would make total sense if we take into account that it would symbolize the andean duality (Hanan and Hurin) present in all the Inca organization.

- The term Kamayuq stands for: "guard; vigilant; spokesman; specialist; responsible for something.", it comes from the word kamaq: "Administrator, administration, sovereign." and the suffix -yuq: "with; owner; that have." A non-military example for kamayuq would be the Khipu kamayuq, the specialist in making, reading and storing quipus.
- The word Apukispay or Apusquipay could come from the word Apu: "Powerful; rich; leader; sovereign; chief; authority." and kispay, that would come from Qispi: "Glass; crystal". In this case, meaning "that shines".

Inca rank	Soldiers under their command	Current equivalent
Antara / Qina kamayuq	–	Flautist
Tinya kamayuq	–	Drummer
Qiqiri kamayuq	–	Trumpeter
Pututu kamayuq	–	Trumpeter (Conch trumpet)
Awqaq runa	0	Soldier
Pukara Kamayuq	0	Garrison
Chunka Kamayuq	10	Sergeant
Pishqa chunka Kamayuq	50	Lieutenant
Pachak Kamayuq	100	Captain
Pishqa pachak Kamayuq	500	Lieutenant colonel
Waranqa Kamayuq	1,000	Colonel
Pishqa waranqa Kamayuq	5,000	Brigadier general
Unu	10,000	Major general
Apukispay	The whole army	Field marshal

== Equipment ==
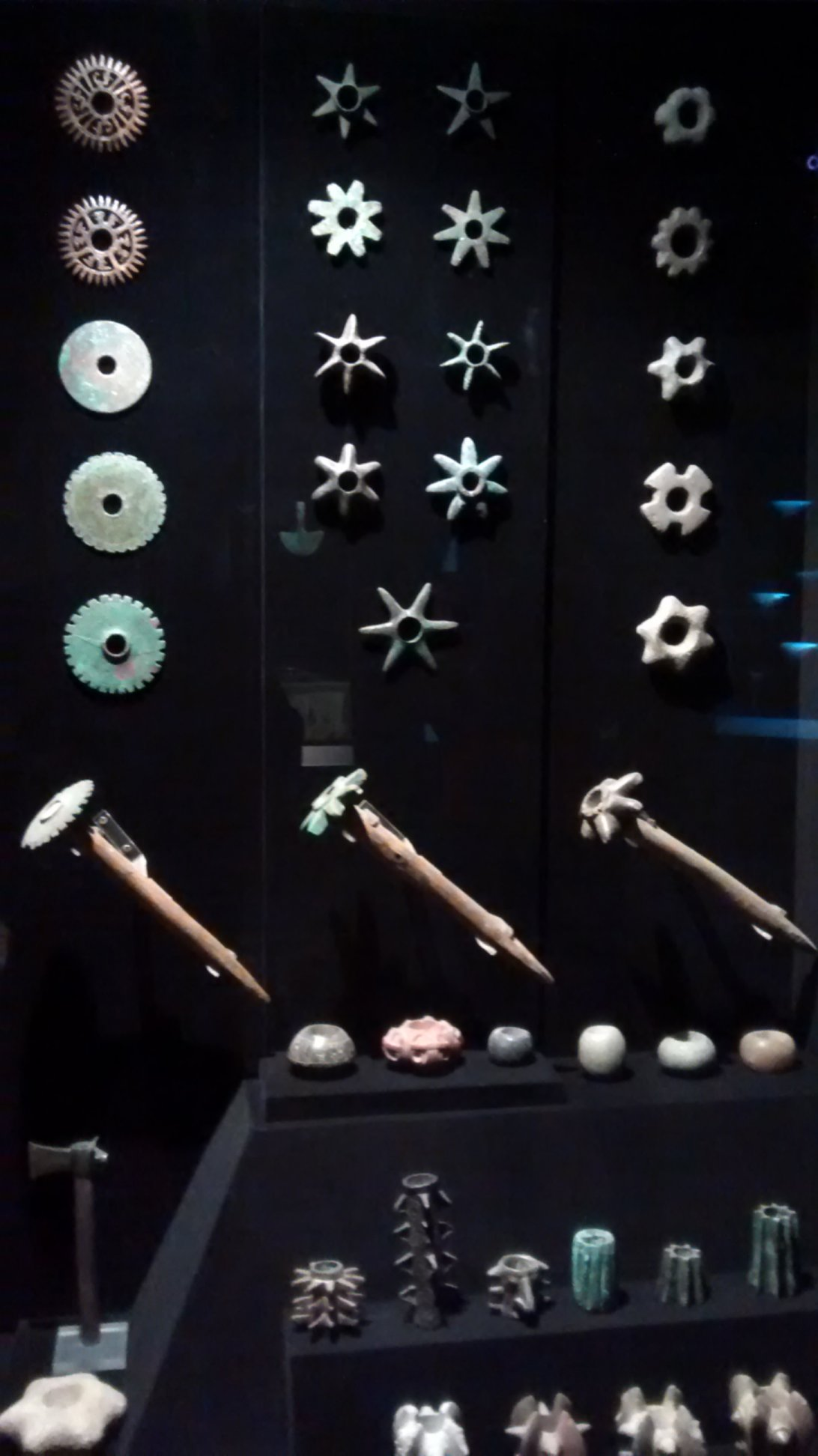
Different heads of Inca maces, note the particular designs at the bottom. Museo de Colchagua, Santa Cruz, Chile.

One of the things that granted to the Incas the capacity to create the biggest empire in the pre-Columbian America, was their ability to use the metallurgy in war and also the ability to adapt to every new kind of weapon, from the bow and arrow of the Antisuyu to the sword and arquebus of the Spaniards. Each Inca soldier carried a different kind of weapon according to his origin in the ayllu, the quality of the decoration as well as the metal that made it up, depended on his military rank (See table above). Here is a list of all the weapons used in the army:

=== Protection ===
- Capes (Quechua: Yaqulla): These capes were made of thick alpaca wool, it was so useful to block arrows and reduce the damage of the hits that later the Spaniards would use them too.
- Chestplates and bracers (Quechua: Awqana Kusma):Used by officers and noblemen. Would consist of thickly quilted and padded cotton tunics, with wooden plates to reinforce them. They also served as the base for the gold or bronze plates that the nobles used as a distinction.
- Helmets (Quechua: Uma chuku): Created from wood, some were reinforced with small copper plates. The officers wore metallic helmets of copper, bronze, or gold depending on their rank, as well as the ornaments.
- Shields (Quechua: Wallqanqa): These shields were made of wood and covered with leather, useful for blocking enemy projectiles and slightly reducing damage from hits, on the front were the symbols of the ayllu of his bearer.
  - Square shield: The favorites of the Andean soldiers, they could have a small cape made of wool in the lower part of the shield to protect the legs.
  - Round Shield: Common on the coast, their easy maneuverability made them appropriate for the deserts and valleys that cover the coasts of the Chinchaysuyu.
  - Rectangular shield: Large shields made of wood brought from the jungle, were placed on the back and were used by soldiers who had to use both hands to fight.

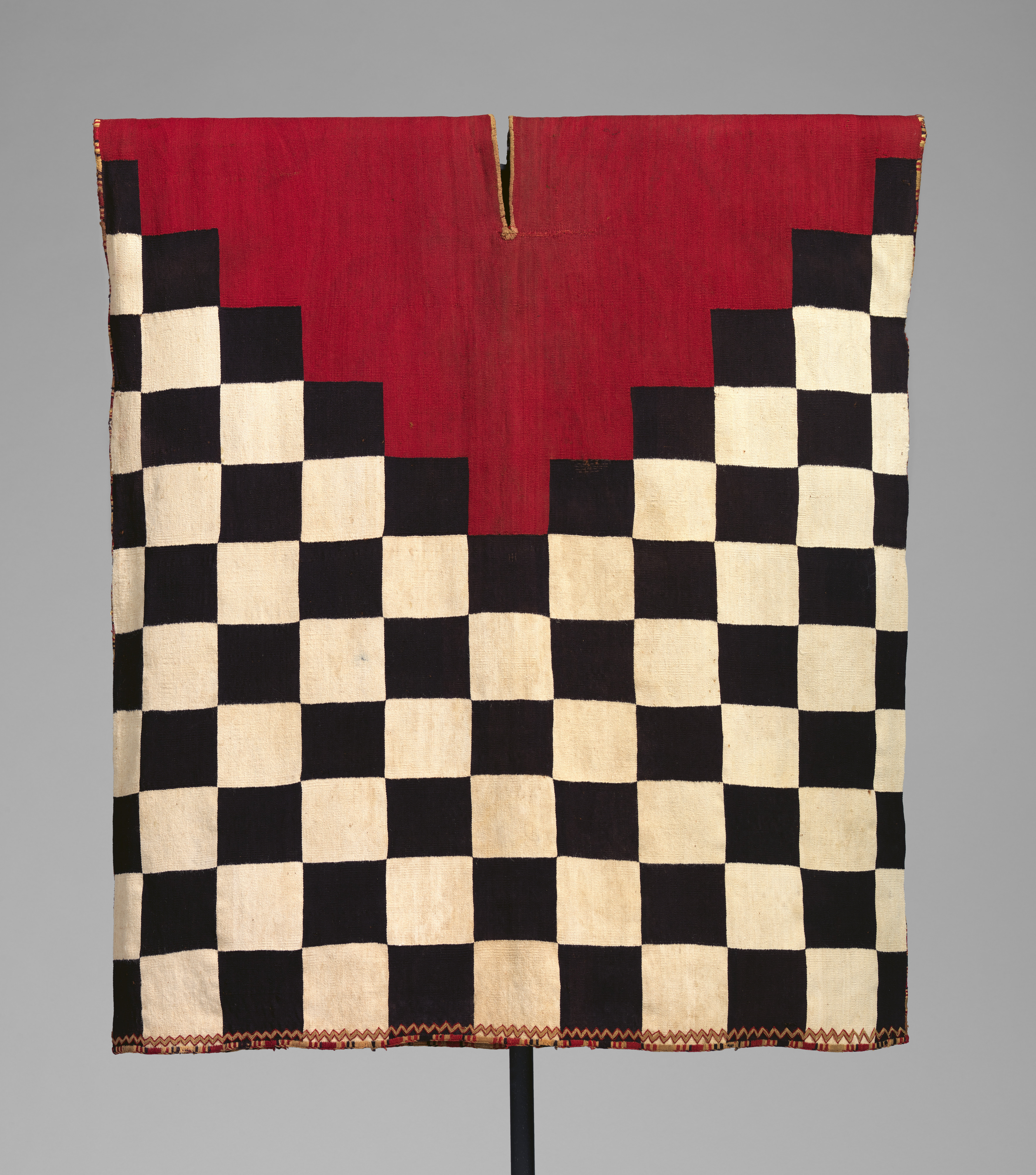
An Inca standard military tunic made of black and white checks and a red triangle below the neck. Metropolitan Museum of Art.

=== Weapons ===
- Axes (Quechua: Chiqtana) – Light weapon used in all places of the empire.
- Bolas (Quechua: Liwi) – Three or four stone balls tied to be thrown in order to immobilize the enemy and deal damage on the impact, acquired during the first campaigns to the Collasuyu, were one of the most effective weapons against the Spanish cavalry. Its bearers were trained from a young age in its use during hunting.
- Bow and arrow (Quechua: Wachina and Wachi, respectively) – It wasn't used by the Andean civilizations until the expansion towards the Antisuyu and the annexation of the Chachapoyas kingdom. Hunters and warriors specialized in its use were indispensable in any important military campaign. Having at their disposal poisoned and incendiary arrows, they were fundamental for the expansion of the Inca Empire as well as during the siege of Cuzco and the Manco Inca rebellion later on.
- Clubs (Quechua: Waqtana) – Thick bats made of wood, its efficiency was only remarkable against unarmoured warriors, it was long and both hands had to be employed to use it. It was equipped by some ethnic groups in the north of the Collasuyu (modern-day Bolivia). It wasn't very popular, unlike the mace, due to its bulkiness and the time it took to make each hit.
- Daggers (Quechua: Tuksina) – Ecuadorian priest and writer Juan de Velasco claimed the existence of a pre-Hispanic "Incan sword" called "Tuccina" (pronounced as "Tucsina"), which was made of copper or bronze and thus much thicker but smaller than the European sword. Its build allowed it be used with one hand. However, Velasco has been infamous for his proposal of a supposed "Kingdom of Quito" that never actually existed, paired with the lack of archaeological evidence as well as the lack of mention in other Spanish colonial chronicles, it was more likely an attempt to magnify the Incan technology to justify the fall of the pre-Inca tribes of Ecuador. In fact, many Quechua dictionaries describe the word "Tuksina" rather as a "dirk, Andean dagger". While it is possible that the Incas did use blades other than the Tumi, their usage might have been limited to ritualistic purposes, executions, as tools or for self-defense rather than for direct combat.
- Halberds (Quechua: Kunka kuchuna) – These were a symbol of power for the troops in Cuzco and throughout the empire, as generals and important heads of provinces used them. Similar to the European models, it consisted of an axe blade with a spearhead on the back side. They were between 1.5 and 2 meters of length.

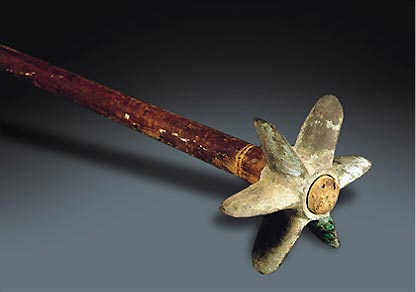
The standard Inca mace with a star-shaped copper head.

- Maces (Quechua: Champi) – The most common weapon in the Incan arsenal, it consisted of a wooden shaft with a heavy, usually star-shaped stone head. The star-shape increased the damage of the strikes.
  - Coastal variation– The Moche used some variant of "spear-maces", long wooden clubs that ended in cone-shaped heads. The Moche state was theocratic and militaristic, though they didn't invest much in their army, which led to them being conquered by the Wari empire. After the dissolution of the Wari, the Chimu kingdom inherited the weapon from their predecessors, this time decreasing the size of the maces so that the troops can still use their shields during combat. For the common footman it was made of wood, for the higher ranks the head was covered in metal to increase the damage (All metals were used, the tumbaga was an alloy of gold and copper, or another metal depending on the area, after the annexation to the Inca empire, the tumbaga was used in the weapons of the Tawantinsuyu). This weapon fell into disuse after the Chimu-Inca war.
- Slings (Quechua: Waraka) – The huaracas were fundamental in the Incan army, the slingers were trained from childhood for hunting and self-defense, thus improving their dexterity in the weapon. Its simplicity and effectiveness (with projectiles reaching up to 120 km/h) explains why bow and arrow never replaced it. Generally made of wool, there were also ceremonial slings, which were used in meetings as an ornament only. The use of the huaraca from childhood remained in the Andes even after the fall of the Inca empire, its practice passed down from generation to generation to the present day, although mainly to scare off birds from the fields.
- Spears (Quechua: Chuki) – The spears, just like the axes, were of universal use, the head could be of any metal. Occasionally, feathers were added as decoration and marker of the bearer's status or affiliation.
- Spear thrower (Quechua: Kumana) – A classic hunting weapon from the jungle regions of Antisuyu, it was never used as a military weapon until the retreat of Manco Inca Yupanqui to Vilcabamba when it was integrated into the Guerrilla warfare against the Peruvian cavalry.

During the rule of Manco Inca, who spent time with the Spanish, the Incan army also learned to use Spanish weapons as well as their tactics and the strengths and weaknesses of each weapon. Once they also learned horse-riding, the Incan forces were near equal to the Spanish in terms of combat strength. This played a key role in the survival of Inca resistance.

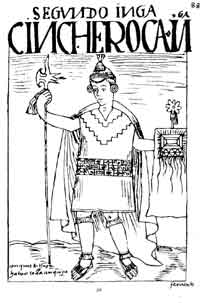
Sinchi Ruqa, the first Sapa Inca using the mascapaicha, Felipe Guaman Poma de Ayala, El primer nueva corónica y buen gobierno, circa 1615.

== Forms of conquest ==
=== Peaceful conquest ===
Peaceful conquest was possible when a curaca agreed to recognize the Sapa Inca as his emperor in return for a number of benefits. These benefits could include gifts, investment in public works, recognition at their investiture, interchange of women to establish family ties, etc. Whether submission was due to fear of the Inca army or genuine friendship, the curaca became a beneficiary of the offered gifts, but he also became subject to Inca demands: his lands had to be handed over to the state, he had to supply labour and soldiers, etc. It was a conquest through reciprocity.

=== Violent conquest ===
Violent conquest would occur if a tribe was unwilling to accept the Sapa Inca as their emperor. This generally resulted in a bloody war. The conquered tribe would be subject to reprisals according to the length of the war. The defeated leader would be executed and, depending on the degree of their rebellion, the subjects would either be moved to a distant place or, in extreme cases, totally annihilated as a punishment to avoid future uprisings.

== History ==
=== Local phase (13th century–1438) ===
Expansion of the Inca Empire.

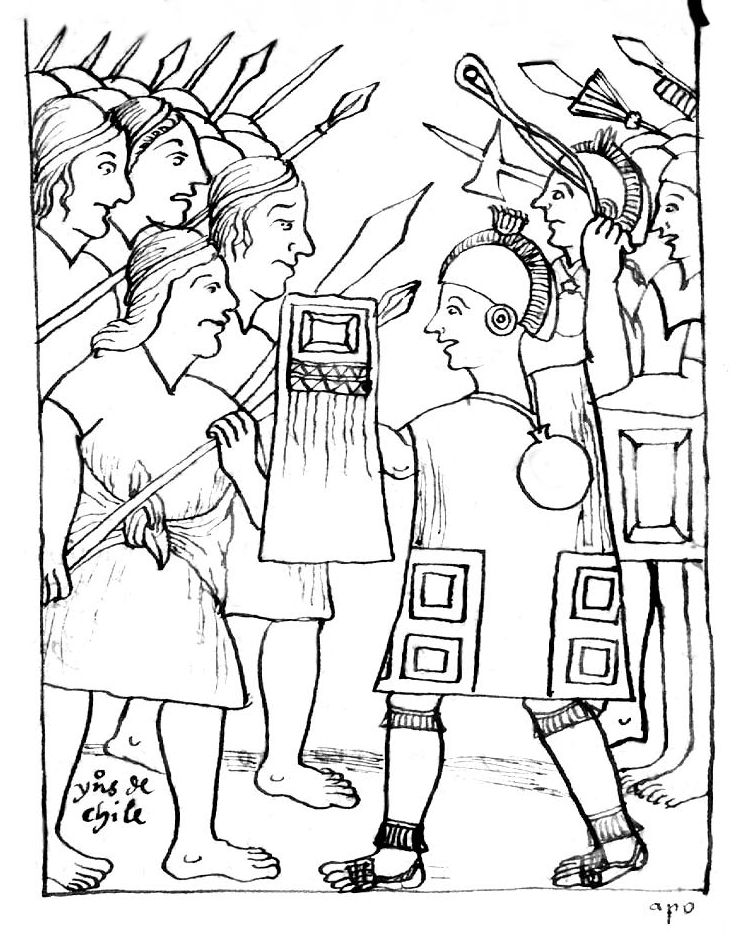
The Battle of the Maule between the Incas (right) and the Mapuches (left), Felipe Guaman Poma de Ayala, El primer nueva corónica y buen gobierno, circa 1615.

This phase lasted from the beginning of the Inca period until the end of the rule of Pachacuti (or Pachacútec). During this phase, the army was relatively small and weak. The only battles it fought were for reasons of defence or survival. On occasions, the rulers also led the army into battle. There were frequent battles during this period against small tribes such as the Alcahuasis or the Canas. The Aymara or the powerful Chancas were greater threats and the Inca army had to confront them on a number of occasions.

=== Imperial phase (1438–1532) ===
This period started with the defeat of the Chancas, with Pachacuti at the head of the Inca army. From this time on the Inca army would be a multiethnic army and it would be more sophisticated and numerous.

The conquered ethnic groups rapidly became a part of the Inca nation and contributed men to its armies. During this period the majority of the wars involved the conquest of new territories and it was at this time that the army was at its most powerful.

=== Invasion (1532–1572) ===
During this period the majority of the army was decimated by illness, rebellions, and Spanish attacks. Initially, the Inca soldiers feared the horses and firearms of the Spanish, with this intimidation reducing their fighting efficiency. Soon, however, the soldiers forgot their fears and some Inca battalions even fought with swords and Spanish weapons and as cavalry units.

"...it was something to see them bravely ride out with Spanish swords, shields and helmets and every Indian armed in this way charged on horseback...the Inca (Manco Inca) appeared on horseback among his people with his lance in his hand..."

— crónicas de Antonio de Herrera. Historia general de los hechos de los castellanos en las Islas y Tierra Firme del mar Océano. Madrid (1601–1615).

For the largest battles, the Inca army was commanded by Quizquiz and Manco Inca Yupanqui, who was commander during the battle of Sacsayhuamán.

At the end of this period, the Inca army lost battles not just to the Spanish but also to subject tribes that took advantage of the arrival of the Spanish.

== Generals in the Inca army ==
- Quizquiz, general of Atahualpa.
- Chalcuchimac, general of Atahualpa.
- Rumiñawi, general of Atahualpa.
- Atoc, general of Huascar.

== See also ==
- Pachacútec
- Túpac Yupanqui
- Huayna Capac
- Chincha Kingdom
- Chachapoyas Confederation
- Chimu Kingdom
- Spanish conquest of Peru
- Battle of Ollantaytambo
- Peruvian Army
- Indian auxiliaries
- Cahuide
