= Battle of Vilcaconga =

1533 Spanish victory over the Incas

- Part of the Spanish conquest of Peru
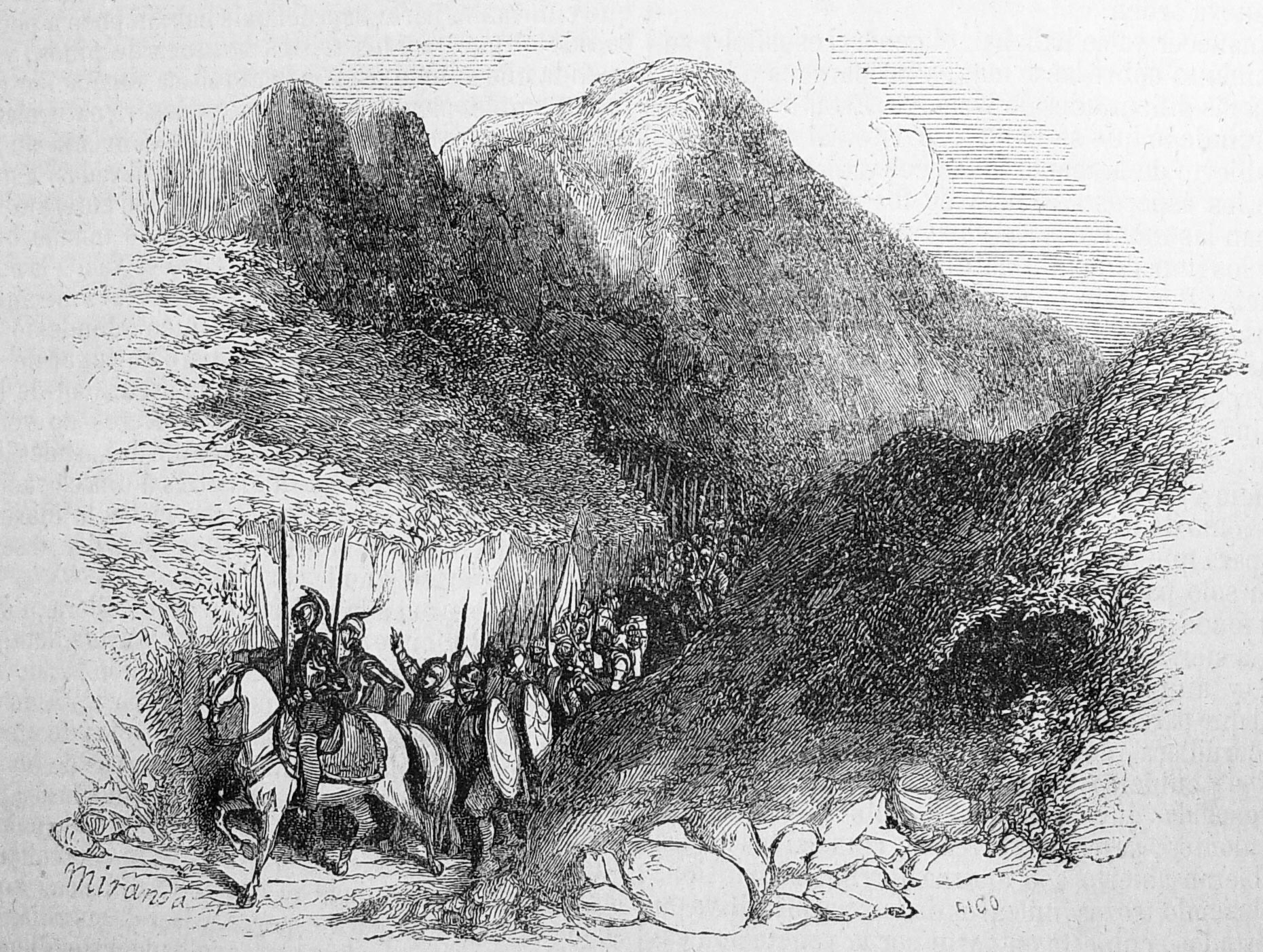
- Engraving from the history of William H. Prescott depicting Pizarro’s Spanish host traveling through the rugged Andes mountains. In one of these passes, an advance guard commanded by Hernando de Soto would be ambushed
Date	November 8–9, 1533
Location	Vilcaconga mountain pass, present-day Peru
Result	Spanish victory

Belligerents
Spanish Empire; Indian auxiliaries	Inca Empire

Commanders and leaders
Hernando de Soto; Diego de Almagro	Quizquiz; Yurac Huallpa

Strength
300 Spaniards; Indian auxiliaries	3000

Casualties and losses
6 dead 17 injured 3 horses Many indian auxiliaries	800 between dead and wounded

The Battle of Vilcaconga took place during the Spanish conquest of the Inca Empire from November 8–9, 1533. The Spanish won a convincing victory, suffering minimal casualties.

== Battle ==
The Spanish emerged as victors in the Battle of Cajamarca in November 1532. Some 180 Spaniards under Francisco Pizarro were in control of major parts of the vast Inca Empire and held its emperor, Atahualpa, hostage. After recovering a vast ransom for his release, the Spanish had the Sapa Inca executed on July 26. Pizarro and his army crossed the mountains and rejoined Diego de Almagro, who was commanding some 100 Spaniards. The Incas still controlled large territory including their capital Cuzco, and commanders who had been ordered to stand down by a captive Atahualpa now moved south toward the Spanish, able to rally tens of thousands of soldiers. The Spanish, for their part, sought to conquer Cuzco and add it to their territory.

The Inca general Quizquiz commanded the mountain pass at Vilcaconga fortified where the Spaniards would have to pass, including digging spike pits to slow Spanish horses. The Incas planned well and used every advantage they could muster, fighting on about as favorable terms as possible, using the terrain, the element of surprise, and the exhaustion of the Spanish advance force. The Incas attacked a Spanish advance group of forty horsemen led by Hernando de Soto late in the day on November 8. The soldiers would have been tired from a full day of marching, and the Incas were able to attack from multiple sides, with the cover of nightfall, and from charging down a slope. Several Spaniards were killed, and the rest in deadly peril. Nevertheless, de Soto's forces fought their way to the top of the slope and held out for the rest of the troops the next day. Another forty horsemen led by Almagro arrived on November 9. This combined force, though still numerically outnumbered, managed to rout Quizquiz's forces and press further towards Cuzco.

Vilcaconga ensured that the Spanish would not be stopped on their way to the Incan capital, Cuzco. It was captured in the Battle of Cuzco and Pizarro entered the city in triumph on November 15, 1533.

== Analysis ==
Despite the lopsided casualty numbers, wherein the Spanish only lost 6 soldiers and 3 horses, the Incas performed well in the battle, and showed more success than at other battles which were pure one-sided routs. Records seem to indicate that the Incas at least came close to breaking the line thanks to the advantages they gained for themselves. Working against them was the excellent armor the Spanish wore, which shrugged off attacks such as sling bullets or darts at range, and honed and drilled Spanish pike tactics that made getting in close to deliver a damaging blow difficult.

Pedro Cieza de León wrote a detailed journal of the battle which later historians have used as a major primary source for the historiography of the battle.
