= Battle of Chillopampa =

First battle of Inca Civil War

- Part of Inca Civil War
Date	After 1529, probably 1531
Location	At Chillopampa Plains, in present-day Tungurahua Province, Ecuador
Result	Huáscaran victory
Territorial changes	Continued advance of Huáscaran forces

Belligerents
Atahualpans	Huáscarans

Commanders and leaders
Atahualpa (POW)	Atoc

Strength
40,000	50,000

Casualties and losses
Unknown	Unknown

The Battle of Chillopampa was the first battle of the Inca Civil War.

Following the death of Sapa Inca Huayna Capac in 1527, his legitimate heir Huáscar had watched as illegitimate son Atahualpa inherited the northern parts of the vast Inca Empire. (Note: Some historical accounts dispute this as the cause of the conflict.) In 1531, he sent his general Atoc to reclaim those areas viewed as rightfully belonging to him and to the line of the dynasty of Manco Cápac. The battle of Chillopampa Plains was the first major encounter, where the vast superiority and tactical experience of Atoc made the Huáscaran side emerge as victors. Atahualpa was captured in battle, but escaped to face the armies of his half-brother again in the battle of Chimborazo.
