= Ukumari =

Ukumari (Quechua for bear or spectacled bear) may refer to:

- Ukumari (Inca warrior)
- A regional park in Colombia
- Another name for the spectacled bear
