= Ullco Colla =

Incan insurgent (died 1531)

Ullco Colla (died 1531), a leader of the Cañari, was an Incan nobleman who supported the cause of Huáscar in the Inca Civil War. He commanded forces resisting Atahualpa in the north, defecting to the side of the Huáscarans and the central government in Cuzco, but was killed fighting at Chimborazo. His city was seized by the north and was spared, however, as the royal tassel was surrendered to Atahualpa.
