= Treasure of the Llanganatis =

Supposed treasure in Ecuador

The Treasure of the Llanganates refers to a huge amount of gold, silver, platinum and electrum artifacts, as well as other treasures, supposedly hidden deep within the Llanganates mountain range of Ecuador by the Inca general Rumiñahui.

== History ==
In 1532 Francisco Pizarro founded the town of San Miguel de Piura and began the conquest of the Inca Empire. Later in the same year, he captured the Inca king Atahualpa at Cajamarca. Atahualpa, seeing that the Spaniards cherished gold above all, promised to fill a room with gold and another equally large with silver in exchange for his freedom. Pizarro agreed to do this, although he likely had no intention to ever let Atahualpa leave. Before the room could be filled with gold, Pizarro's distrust of Atahualpa, and his influence over the many remaining Inca warriors, caused him to have the Inca garroted on July 26, 1533.

The legend holds that the Inca general Rumiñahui was on his way to Cajamarca with an enormous amount of worked gold for the ransom when he learned that Atahualpa had been murdered. Accounts of the amount of gold involved varies in different versions of the legend, but all agree that on the news of Atahualpa's death, he sent the porters East to areas that are to the present day uninhabited and later returned to Quito and hauled more treasures, including tiles of the temple of the Sun and possessions of the ñustas (temple dancers). The treasure is assumed to have been hidden in a cave, or dumped into a lake. Rumiñahui continued fighting against the Spanish, and though he was eventually captured and tortured, he never revealed the location of the treasure.
