= ATOC =

ATOC may refer to:

- Acoustic thermometry
- Amgen Tour of California, a cycling race
- A Touch of Cloth, a British TV comedy series
- Rail Delivery Group, formerly the Association of Train Operating Companies, in the United Kingdom

== See also ==
- Atoc, an Inca general
