= Battle of Quipaipán =

1532 battle of the Inca Civil War

- Part of Inca Civil War
Date	April 1532
Location	Quipaipan, in present-day Peru, close to Cuzco
Result	Atahualpista victory; Start the Cuzco massacre and end of the Incan Civil War.; Reunification of the Inca Empire
Territorial changes	Cuzco captured by Atahualpan Army

Belligerents
Atahualpans	Huáscarans

Commanders and leaders
Chalkuchimac; Quizquiz	Huáscar (POW); Topa Atao (POW); Tito Atauchi (POW)

Strength
Maybe 30,000	10,000–60,000

Casualties and losses
Probably low	Entire army destroyed

The Battle of Quipaipán was the decisive battle of the Inca Civil War between the brothers Atahualpa and Huáscar. After the victory at Chimborazo, Atahualpa stopped in Cajamarca as his generals followed Huáscar to the south. The second confrontation took place at Quipaipán, where Huáscar was again defeated, his army disbanded, Huáscar himself captured and - save for the intervention of Pizarro - the entire Inca Empire nearly fallen to Atahualpa.

Historians know today that the battle took place a couple of miles west of the Inca capital Cusco in April 1532. According to the number of soldiers that Atahualpa kept in Cajamarca, after the battle of Chimborazo (some 80,000 men), his generals Chalicuchima and Quizquiz should have led between 50,000 and 100,000 men. Huáscar's force was probably slightly smaller and shocked, as they had been utterly beaten earlier in Ecuador.

Little of the battle is known. Atahualpa's generals won a decisive victory. They shattered Huáscar's army once again, captured Huáscar himself, and shortly thereafter conquered his capital Cusco for Atahualpa. The civil war was thereafter decided, and Atahualpa should have become sole ruler of the mighty Inca Empire had he not been captured himself by Francisco Pizarro in Cajamarca.

== Bibliography ==
- Cevallos, Pedro Fermin (1870). Resúmen de la historia del Ecuador, desde su orijen hasta 1845. Lima.
