= Battle of Maraycalla =

1534 battle

- Part of the Spanish conquest of Peru
Date	1534
Location	Maraycalla, present-day Peru
Result	Spanish victory

Belligerents
Nueva Castilla; Native Allies	Northern Inca Empire

Commanders and leaders
Hernando de Soto (WIA); Diego de Almagro (WIA); Paullu Inca	Quizquiz

Strength
50 knight 30 Infantry; 6000 Indian auxiliaries	Lower than those of the rival

Casualties and losses
1 dead spaniard, 80 injured	Unknown

The battle of Maraycalla was fought in 1534 between Spanish conquistadors and renegade forces of the Inca Empire (Atahualpa faction of the Inca Civil War), whose capital Cuzco had been taken by the Spaniards in November 1533. The Inca army was commanded by famous general Quizquiz. After losing the battle, Quizquiz' army retreated via Cajamarca to its base in the Northern capital Quito.

When approaching Quito after marching more than 1500 km, Quizquiz learned that Spanish forces had already taken possession of Quito. Quizquiz wanted to continue the fight, but the Inca general was slain by his mutinous forces.
