= Inca Civil War =

War of succession just before the Spanish conquest

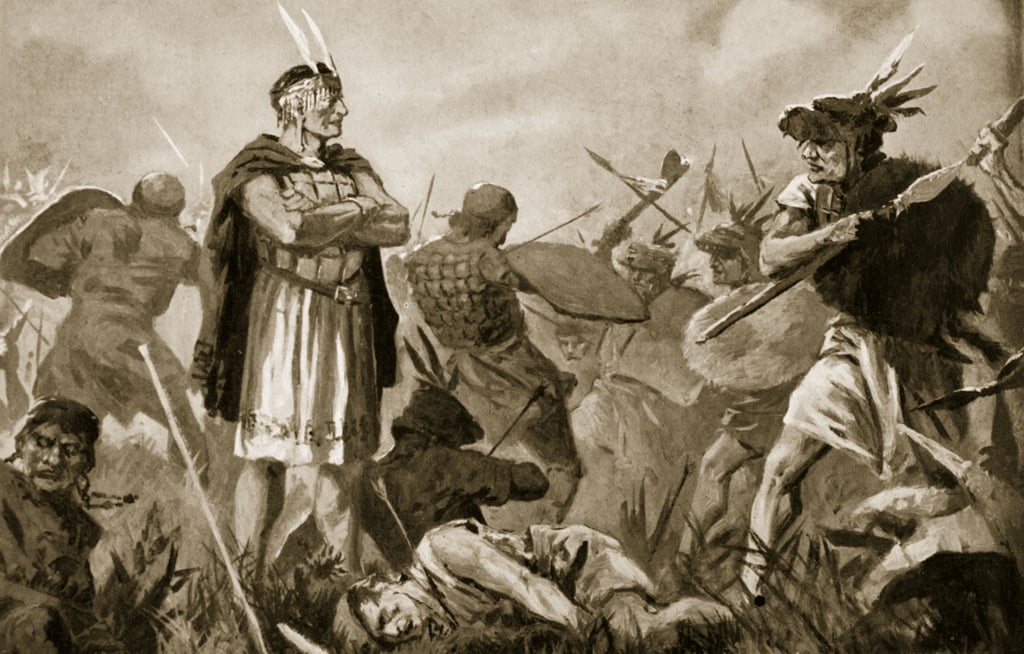
- Illustration by John Harris Valda, envisaging an encounter between Huáscar and Atahualpa on a battlefield during the civil war
Date	1529 – April 1532
Location	Peru and Ecuador
Result	Atahualpista victory; Reunion of the Inca Empire under the rule of Atahualpa; Execution of Huáscar; Starting of the Spanish conquest of the Inca Empire

Belligerents
Huascaristas	Atahualpistas

Commanders and leaders
Huáscar (executed); Atoc †; Hango †; Topa Atao (executed); Ullco Colla †; Tito Atauchi; Uampa Yupanqui; Guanca Auqui; Agua Panti; Paca Yupanqui	Atahualpa; Chalcuchima; Quizquiz; Rumiñawi; Ukumari; Tomay Rima †

Strength
~400,000; 100,000 Ecuadorian Cañaris	Initially 50,000–100,000; At peak some 250,000

Casualties and losses
~100,000–500,000 killed Tumebamba destroyed	Unknown
- ~160,000 Ecuadorian Cañaris massacred Death toll: estimated 60,000 to 1,100,000 killed

The Inca Civil War, also known as the Inca Dynastic War, the Inca War of Succession, or, sometimes, the War of the Two Brothers, was fought between half-brothers Huáscar and Atahualpa, sons of Huayna Capac, over succession to the throne of the Inca Empire. The war followed Huayna Capac's death.

It began in 1529, and lasted until 1532. Huáscar initiated the war; appointed as emperor and claiming the throne, he wanted to defeat Atahualpa's competition. Atahualpa was tactically superior to his brother in warcraft and to the mighty armies of Cusco, which their father had stationed in the north part of the empire during the military campaign. Accounts from sources all vary in the exact details.

Following Atahualpa's victory, Spanish forces led by Francisco Pizarro invaded this region. He ultimately captured and killed Atahualpa, after receiving a ransom that was purportedly to free him. The Inca Civil War has been characterized as an important factor in enabling the Spanish conquest of the Inca Empire.

== Causes of the division of the empire ==
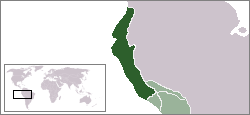
Inca Empire under the control of Atahualpa. It was almost coterminous with the former Chinchay Suyu province

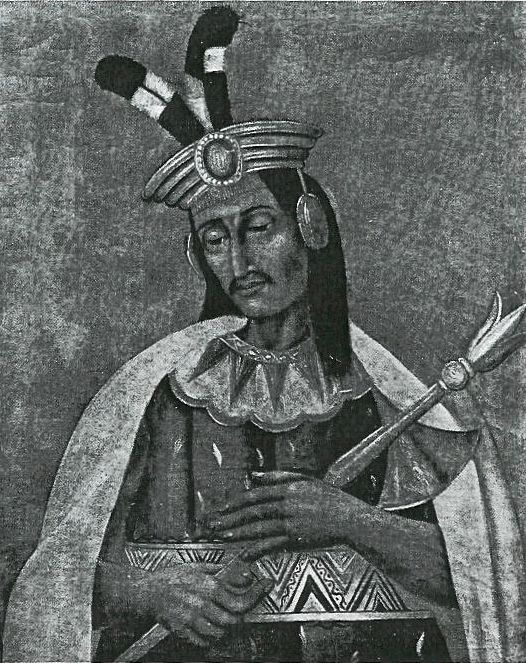
Huáscar, who was defeated in the war between him and his brother

In 1524–1526, the Spaniards, under the command of Francisco Pizarro, explored the northwestern coast of South America. These Spaniards are believed to have carried smallpox, measles, or influenza to the continent, as these had been endemic among Europeans for centuries. The new infectious diseases erupted in epidemics and caused high mortality and disaster for the Inca and other indigenous peoples, who had no immunity. The outbreak of a disease killed the most people in the first years of the Civil War. Although Huayna Capac, who was in Tumebamba, did not personally encounter any Spaniards, he possibly contracted malaria or smallpox and died around 1527.

Huayna Capac had originally named Ninan Cuyochi as his successor. A group of nobles was sent to Cusco to inform Ninan Cuyochi. However, Huayna Capac later instead appointed Huascar as his heir. Since the auguries were negative, the great priest (Villaq Umu) returned to Tumebamba for Huayna Capac to make a new choice. But at his arrival, the Sapa Inca was already dead. Meanwhile, the group of nobles sent to Cusco learned of the death of Ninan Cuyochi. It was uncertain who should be the next Inca emperor; they had no clear rules of succession. If the sovereign and his successor both died, then a new emperor was elected by the Inca nobles.

Huáscar and Atahualpa, two sons of Huayna Capac born of different mothers, both vied for the position. Huascar, was, through his mother, a part of Capac Ayllu, the panaka of Topa Inca. His parents, Huayna Capac and Chincha Ocllo, were siblings. As in some other cultures, the Inca violated incest rules to keep religious and political authority limited among a small elite. Huascar was therefore supported by the nobility in Cuzco, by religious and political authorities and other main figures. The Cuzco nobility, primarily the high priests, endowed Huascar with the mascapaicha, the royal crown. This decision prevented Northern factions opposed to Huascar from influencing Sapa Inca succession. This supposedly quick coronation process gave Atahualpa the political justification to challenge Huascar's new legitimacy.

As to Atahualpa, sources disagree on his ancestry. According to some sources, mainly Inca Garcilaso de la Vega, he was the son of a woman from Quito. Juan de Velasco says Atahualpa's mother was Paccha, the queen of Quito. Historian Maria Rostworowski claims that his mother was Tupa Palla from the lineage in Upper Cuzco and the large majority of reliable sources say that Atahualpa was the son of a woman from the panaka of Pachacuti. Regardless of his maternal line, Atahualpa seems to have accompanied his father on every military expedition in the empire's northern regions. Huayna Capac likely used these expeditions to test his son's military capabilities. He sent Atahualpa on a military expedition to conquer the Pasto people. However, Atahualpa fled and received harsh treatment upon his return.

If Atahualpa's mother was from a Cuzco panaka, then the succession conflict was most likely a conflict between panakas. French historian Henri Favre argues that the conflict was not just between opposing panakas but all the panakas of Cusco, depending on whether they were Hurin (low) or Hanan (high). Another possible cause for the war is that Inca generals in the north, Quizquiz and Rumiñawi, previously employed by Huayna Capac, may have encouraged Atahualpa to rebel against his brother. Given that the generals held closer relationships with Atahualpa than Huascar, they may have concluded that they would benefit from Atahualpa's reign as Sapa Inca.

== Movements during the war ==
Soon after Huáscar claimed the throne, he expected all subjects to swear allegiance to him. To announce his loyalty, Atahualpa sent his most trusted captains to Cuzco, along with generous gifts of gold and silver (as was customary). Suspicious, Huáscar refused Atahualpa's offering. Accusing the half-brother of rebellion, he ordered some of his messengers killed, and sent back his captains dressed as women. Atahualpa declared war against his brother.

Just before the Spaniards arrived in Cajamarca, Atahualpa sent troops to Cusco to capture Huáscar, and headed south himself to execute him. (Later Francisco Pizarro used this as one of the excuses to execute Atahualpa after Pizarro collected the ransom of gold and silver promised to him for his freedom.)

Huáscar gathered his soldiers in preparation for attack. After getting stunned by his brother, Huáscar proclaimed him a traitor. Generals Chalcuchimac, Quizquiz, and Rumiñawi are believed to have been born in the northern part of the empire, and transferred their loyalty to Atahualpa. He assembled the former imperial army in Quito, the Northern region left for his control. People loyal to Atahualpa created a new capital in Quito, so they could follow their preferred ruler and gain favor within the government. Atahualpa agreed to take the leadership role of Sapa Inca in this new capital.

According to chronicler Diego de Rosales, at the moment of the civil war an Inca army was suppressing a rebellion in the Diaguita lands of Copiapó and Coquimbo. With the rebellion brutally repressed and the Inca giving rebels "great chastise", the commander of the army departed north to support Huáscar, a cousin.

At this news, Huáscar and his army moved north in a surprise attack at Tumebamba. The local Cañari supported the attack, in order to expel the nearest source of power, with the aim to oust the Inca. Atahualpa was captured and imprisoned. While the army celebrated, they got drunk and allowed a woman in to meet Atahualpa. She secretly took a tool that he used that evening to drill a hole and escape. He immediately prepared a counterattack with his large, experienced army from Quito.

From 1531 to 1532, the armies fought many battles. Soon after his escape, Atahualpa moved his army south to the city of Ambato. There, on the plains of Mochacaxa, they found Huáscar's men, defeated them, and captured and killed many soldiers. Captives included the head general, Atoc, whom they tortured with darts and arrows. Atahualpa had his skull made into a "gilded drinking cup, which the Spaniards would note that Atahualpa was still using four years later."

Following this victory, Atahualpa strengthened his army and continued south into his brother's land, winning every encounter. Entering Cajamarca, he added to his numbers. He first tried peaceful means to gain loyalty from Huáscar's men; when that did not work, he killed large numbers of opponents. The survivors were frightened into surrender. One report described how Atahualpa massacred the Cañari tribesmen because they pledged allegiance to Huáscar. When he finally arrived in Cajamarca, Atahualpa sent the majority of his army ahead, led by his head generals, while he stayed in the safety of the city and explored rumors that the Spaniards were entering the land.

Atahualpa's army pushed south through Huáscar's territory, winning at Bonbon and Jauja. The battle starting on the hillside of Vilcas seemed to favor Huáscar stationed in a stone fortress at the top of the hill, but eventually he retreated. Atahualpa's men won at Pincos, Andaguayias, at the battle between Curaguaci and Auancay northwest of Cuzco, at Limatambo, about 20 miles from Cuzco, and Ichubamba, where Huáscar's men fled. In 1532, with Cuzco endangered, "Huáscar sent another army to meet Atahualpa's, but after precarious battles, his forces were routed," and Huáscar was captured. Atahualpa's army had won the war. The news traveled back to Atahualpa in Cajamarca, where the army learned about the Spanish incursion.

== Pizarro and the end of the Spanish conquest of Peru ==
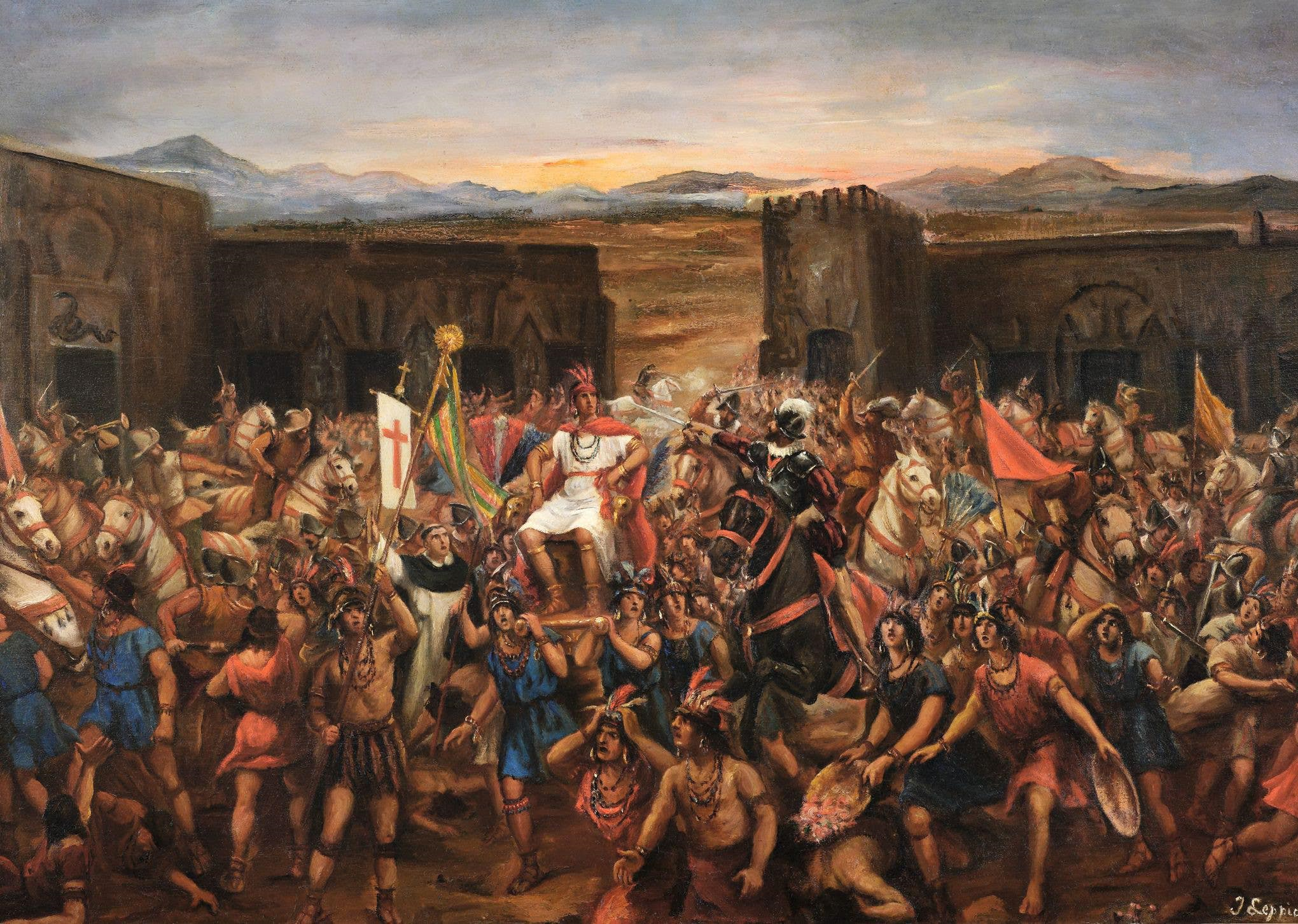
Oil painting by Juan Lepiani representing the capture of Atahualpa in Cajamarca.

Atahualpa was saluted as a hero; he recaptured Cajamarca, making camp outside the city with some 40,000 troops while Chalcuchimac and Quizquiz chased Huáscar's army to the south. With a disastrous northern campaign, Huáscar had not only lost his best generals and many soldiers, but his army was shocked and demoralized. Huascar and Atahualpa's armies met. Although Huáscar had a dominant position, he did not use it, instead retreating across the Cotabambas River on the way to Cuzco.

Chalkuchimac had a plan of his own and predicted the action of Topa Atao. He divided his army in two, sending one contingent around Topa Atao's back, and enveloping and destroying the defenders. In January 1532, only miles from Cuzco, Huáscar's retreat was cut off at Quipaipan, and his army was annihilated and disbanded. Huáscar was captured and the capital Cuzco was seized by Quizquiz. He purged it of Huáscar's supporters in a massacre. Huáscar was executed the following year.

During the course of the war, Atahualpa's army had grown to 250,000 men, all the strength of the Empire. However, before he could leave Cajamarca, the new emperor encountered the conquistador Francisco Pizarro, who had reached the city on 16 November 1532. Atahualpa was captured in the ensuing Battle of Cajamarca.

While holding Atahualpa in custody, Pizarro told him he would have Huáscar brought to Cajamarca and would determine which brother was the better Sapa Inca. In response, Atahualpa ordered Huáscar killed, allegedly by drowning, to prevent him from creating an alliance with the Spanish. Atahualpa also ordered that relatives and supporters of Huáscar be killed to weaken any resistance movements from forming. Atahualpa's men searched for Huayna Capac's sons, but several are believed to have survived by hiding. Months later, on August 29, 1533, Pizarro's men executed Atahualpa by strangulation at the plaza of Cajamarca after accusing him of multiple crimes.

== Casualties ==
It is unknown how many Incas were killed or died during the civil war. However, the estimated population of the Inca empire before an epidemic and the Spanish conquest is estimated to be between 6 and 14 million people. The epidemic is believed to have killed 200,000 people, however, this number could be much larger. The combined factors of civil war, an epidemic, and the Spanish conquest resulted in an estimated population decline of 95 percent over the next century.

== Bibliography ==
- Cieza de León, Pedro de (1998). Cook, Alexandra Parma; Cook, Noble David (eds.). The discovery and conquest of Peru: chronicles of the New World encounter. Latin America in translation, en traducción, em tradução. Durham, NC; London: Duke University Press. ISBN 978-0-8223-2146-0.
- Cobo, Bernabé (2000) [1979]. Hamilton, Roland (ed.). History of the Inca empire: an account of the Indians' customs and their origin together with a treatise on Inca legends, history, and social institutions. The Texas Pan-American series (7th ed.). Austin, TX: University of Texas Press. pp. 164–166. ISBN 978-0-292-73025-0.
- D'Altroy, Terence N. (2003). The Incas. Peoples of America. Malden, MA; Oxford; Victoria: Blackwell. ISBN 978-0-631-17677-0.
- Davies, Nigel (1995). The Incas. Niwot: University Press of Colorado. ISBN 978-0-87081-360-3.
- de León, Pedro de Cieza (1959). von Hagen, Victor Wolfgang (ed.). The Incas, of Pedro de Cieza de Leon. Translated by de Onis, Harriet. Norman, OK: University of Oklahoma Press. pp. 52, 80, 81, 251. OCLC 1296972805.
- de la Vega, Garcilaso (1966). Livermore, H. V. (ed.). Royal commentaries of the Incas, and general history of Peru. Austin: University of Texas Press. OCLC 978186770.
- Hemming, John (1973) [1970]. The conquest of the Incas. A Harvest book. New York: Harcourt Brace Jovanovich. pp. 28–29. ISBN 978-0-15-122560-6.
- Hyams, Edward; Ordish, George (1963). The Last of the Incas: The Rise and Fall of an American Empire. New York: Simon & Schuster. OCLC 491324634.
- Kubler, George (November 1945). "The Behavior of Atahualpa, 1531-1533". The Hispanic American Historical Review. 25 (4): 413–427. doi:10.2307/2508231. JSTOR 2508231.
- Lovell, W. George (September 1992). "'Heavy Shadows and Black Night': Disease and Depopulation in Colonial Spanish America". Annals of the American Association of Geographers. 82 (3): 426–443. doi:10.1111/j.1467-8306.1992.tb01968.x. ISSN 0004-5608.
- MacQuarrie, Kim (2008). The last days of the Incas. New York: Simon & Schuster. p. 50. ISBN 978-0-743-26050-3.
- Means, Philip Ainsworth (1932). Fall of the Inca empire and the Spanish rule in Peru: 1530-1780. New York: Charles Scribner's Sons. OCLC 716374563.
- Powers, Karen Vieira (Autumn 2000). "Andeans and Spaniards in the Contact Zone: A Gendered Collision". The American Indian Quarterly. 24 (4): 511–536. doi:10.1353/aiq.2000.0025. ISSN 1534-1828. S2CID 161418762.
- Prescott, William Hickling (1874). Kirk, John Foster (ed.). History of the Conquest of Peru: With a Preliminary Review of the Civilization of the Incas. Philadelphia, PA: J. B. Lippincott & Co. p. 336.
- Smith, C. T.; Bushnell, G. H. S.; Dobyns, Henry F.; McCorkle, Thomas; Murra, John V. (October–December 1970). "Depopulation of the Central Andes in the 16th Century [and Comments and Reply]". Current Anthropology. 11 (4–5): 453–464. doi:10.1086/201146. S2CID 144381832.
- Tito Cusi Yupanqui, Diego de Castro (2005). Bauer, Ralph (ed.). An Inca account of the conquest of Peru. Boulder, Colo: University Press of Colorado. ISBN 978-0-87081-807-3.
