= Battle of Cusco =

1533 battle

Battle of Cusco (1533)
- Part of the Spanish conquest of Peru
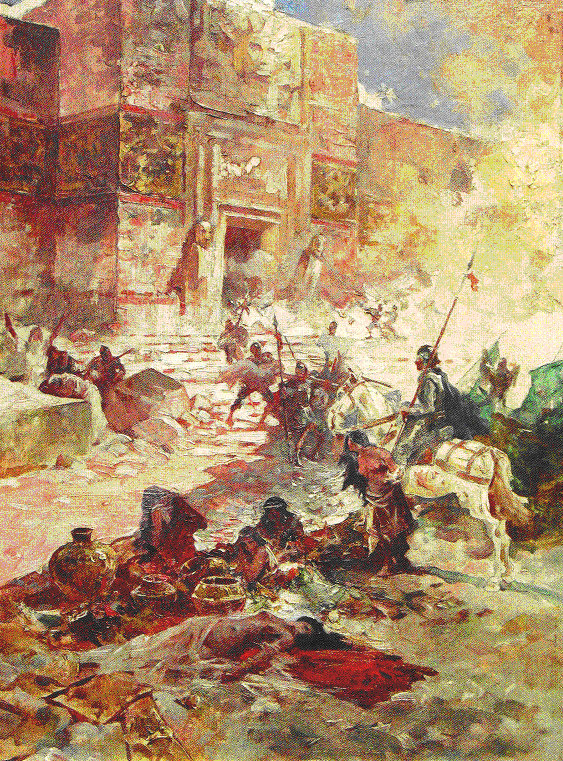
- The looting of the Coricancha by the Spanish conquistadors. Paiting by the Peruvian painter Teófilo Castillo
Date	shortly before November 15, 1533
Location	Cusco, present-day Peru 13.5167°S 71.978°W
Result	Spanish victory

Belligerents
Spanish Empire; Spanish Conquistadores; Native allies: Huancas; Chankas; The Cañari; Chachapoyas	Inca Empire

Commanders and leaders
Hernando de Soto; Juan Pizarro; Francisco Pizarro	Quizquiz

Strength
250–300, 60+ cavalry and 3 guns 40,000+ Indigenous allies	Unknown, but probably 10,000–100,000

Casualties and losses
Minimal, mainly Native allies	Thousands, army routed
- Location within Peru Battle of Cusco (South America) Battle of Cusco (America)

The Battle of Cusco was fought in November 1533 between the Spanish Conquistadors and forces of the Incas.

== The Battle ==
After executing the Inca Atahualpa on July 26, 1533, Francisco Pizarro marched his forces to Cusco, the capital of the Incan Empire. As the Spanish army approached Cusco, Pizarro sent his brother Juan Pizarro and Hernando de Soto ahead with forty men. The advance guard fought a pitched battle with Incan troops in front of the city, securing a victory. The Incan army, under the command of Quizquiz, withdrew during the night.

The next day, November 15, 1533, Pizarro entered Cusco, accompanied by Manco Inca Yupanqui, a young Inca prince who had survived the massacre that Quizquiz had perpetrated against the nobility in Cusco. The Spanish plundered Cusco, finding much gold and silver. Manco was crowned as Sapa Inca and helped Pizarro drive Quizquiz back to the North.

Two years later, Quizquiz was killed by his own followers, leaving the Inca Empire without a leader, since his only equal commander, Chalkuchimac, had been burned in captivity by the Spanish. One year later, Manco Inca Yupanqui fled from Cusco and tried to recapture the city with some 100,000 Incas, but ultimately failed after a ten-month siege.
