= Leonor Curicuillor =

- Born: 1513
- Died: after 1536
- Spouse: Quilaco
- Issue: Leonor Soto
- Father: Huáscar

Leonor Curicuillor (born c. 1513 - d. after 1536), was a princess of the Inca Empire.

She was the daughter of Inca Huáscar (r. 1527-1532). She is the subject of a love story which was described in the chronicle of Cabello de Balboa. She reportedly fell in love with Quilaco, an army captain in the army of her uncle prince Atahualpa. Her father did not approve of her choice because of the enmity between him and Atahualpa, Cuzco and Quito. The love story between her and Quilaco was discontinued and they were separated by the Incan civil war.

After this, the Spaniards arrived in the Inca Empire. After the Spanish conquest, princess Curicuillor and captain Quilaco were finally able to marry, under the protection of the Spanish. They were converted to Catholicism - during which she took the name Leonor Curicuillor and he took the name Hernando Yupanqui - and married with Hernando de Soto as godfather.

However, Leonor Curicuillor was widowed only months later. She was taken as a concubine by Hernando de Soto, with whom she had a daughter, Leonor Soto. They were both alive in 1536, when Hernando de Soto left them when he returned to Spain.
