= Ninan Cuyochi =

Incan royal

- Heir apparent of the Inca Empire
- Predecessor: Huayna Capac
- Successor: Huáscar; Atahualpa
- Born: 1490
- Died: 1527 (aged 37)
- Dynasty: Hanan Qusqu
- Father: Huayna Capac

Ninan Cuyochi (1490–1527) (Classical Quechua: Ninan Kuyuchiq, pronounced [ˈninaŋ kuˈjuchi]) was the oldest son of Sapa Inca Huayna Capac and was first in line to inherit the Inca Empire. He died of smallpox shortly before or after the death of his father, also reportedly from smallpox, bringing about the Inca Civil War in which Huáscar and Atahualpa fought to be the next Sapa Inca.

== Life ==
According to writer Burr Cartwright Brundage, Ninan Cuyochi had a strong faction when Inti's high priest in Quito prepared to confirm his candidacy as next Sapa Inca in 1527.

== Civil War ==
Conflicting factions and the fact that the Spanish chroniclers' accounts stemmed from the winners of the ensuing civil war led to conflicting versions of what actually happened. Thus, although Huayna Capac named the infant Ninan Cuyochi as his first heir, sources differ as to whether the boy died first, was unacceptable because of an unfavorable divination, or even if Huayna simply forgot that he had named him when asked to confirm the nomination.

A second choice was requested and again sources vary. Huayna Capac may have named his son Atahualpa who then refused, named Atahualpa's half-brother Huáscar, or possibly the nobles put forward Huáscar. Regardless, after Huayna Capac's and Ninan Cuyochi's death, Huáscar took on the royal fringe. The dispute over this led to civil war between Huáscar and Atahualpa, the latter of whom was backed by leaders who were based in the north.
