= Battle of Chimborazo =

Battle over the Inca Empire between two brothers

- Part of Inca Civil War
Date	Spring 1532
Location	At Chimborazo, in present-day Ecuador
Result	Atahualpan victory; Start the Ecuadorians Cañaris genocide; Capture and destruction of Tomebamba

Belligerents
Atahualpans	Huáscarans; Tumipampa auxiliaries

Commanders and leaders
Atahualpa; Chalkuchimac; Quizquiz; Rumiñahui	Atoc (POW) (executed); Hango (POW) (executed); Ullco Colla †

Strength
13,000	12,000

Casualties and losses
4,000 casualties	8,000 casualties
- 60,000 Ecuadorian Cañaris massacred

The Battle of Chimborazo was among the first confrontations in the War of the two brothers, a struggle between Huáscar and Atahualpa for power over the Inca Empire. Atahualpa won, having the more capable generals; he drove Huáscar back onto the defensive.

The war resulted from a dispute over dynastic succession. In 1525, Huayna Capac died, leaving a large and powerful empire. He bequeathed the major part of his domain to Huáscar, who in 1532 confronted his brother Atahualpa over the expansion of his smaller share, the northern part of the Inca Empire around Quito. The capital Cajamarca was occupied, Tumebamba defected, and Atahualpa was captured. However, Atahualpa escaped and united himself with Huayna Capac's generals Quizquiz and Chalicuchima, both skillful, and together they attacked Huáscar near Chimborazo. Although superior in numbers, Huáscar was defeated and forced to retreat. The foundations of Huáscar's power were shaken by the defeat, and in the next year, all Cusco dominance came to an end at Quipaipan.

Atoc was reportedly captured in the battle and suffered a most gruesome death at the hands of Chalkuchimac. Some sources suggest his head was used as a golden cup, others that he was left on the battlefield with his eyes torn out. Pedro Sarmiento de Gamboa claims he and second-in command Hango were flayed and their skins used as drums. Ullco Colla, lord of the defected Tumipampa tribe, died in battle and his city captured shortly after, but reportedly spared by Atahualpa.

== Bibliography ==
- Kubler, George (1945), "The Behavior of Atahualpa, 1531-1533", Hispanic American Historical Review 25.
- Towle, George Makepeace (1881), Pizarro, his Adventures and Conquests, London: Routledge.
- Williams, Henry Smith (1907), The Historians' History of the World.
- Rostworowski de Diez Canseco, María (1960), "Succession, Cooption to Kingship, and Royal Incest Among the Inca.", Southwestern Journal of Anthropology 16.
