= Ukumari (Inca warrior) =

Ukumari (Quechua for bear or spectacled bear, hispanicized spelling Ucumari) was an Inca prince and general supporting the cause of Atahualpa in the Inca Civil War.

The name is used for a military leader in a children's historical novel by Daniel Peters.
