= Quizquiz =

Inca general

Apo Quizquiz
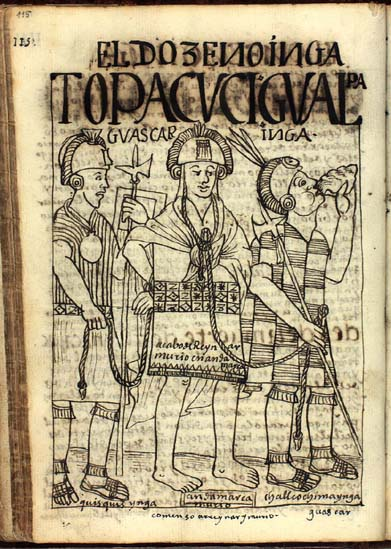
- Quizquiz (left), while leading Huáscar prisoner
- Died: 1535
- Occupation: General

Quizquiz or Quisquis was, along with Chalcuchimac and Rumiñawi, one of Inca emperor Atahualpa's leading generals. In April 1532, he and his companions led the armies of Atahualpa to victory in the battles of Mullihambato, Chimborazo and Quipaipan, where, along with Chalkuchimac, they defeated and captured Huáscar and promptly killed his family, seizing the capital, Cuzco. Quizquiz later commanded Atahualpa's troops in the battles of Vilcaconga, Cuzco (both 1533) and Maraycalla (1534), ultimately being bested by the Spanish forces in both accounts.

After the ensuing battles, Quizquiz fled further into the safety of the Andean mountains, but his forces soon demanded that he accept the Spanish demands, and, it being planting season, that they be able to return to their families. Quizquiz refused, and his war-weary troops eventually killed him in 1535.

== Origin of the name ==
Quizquiz is a Quechua term, which stands for leader or Little Bird par excellence. According to some authors instead, the surname means barber and derives from his duty to shave the King Huayna Capac that the General had exercised, both for his dexterity and for Huayna Capac's total confidence so that he would not have liked to offer his throat to anyone else.

== Biography ==
=== Military triumphs ===
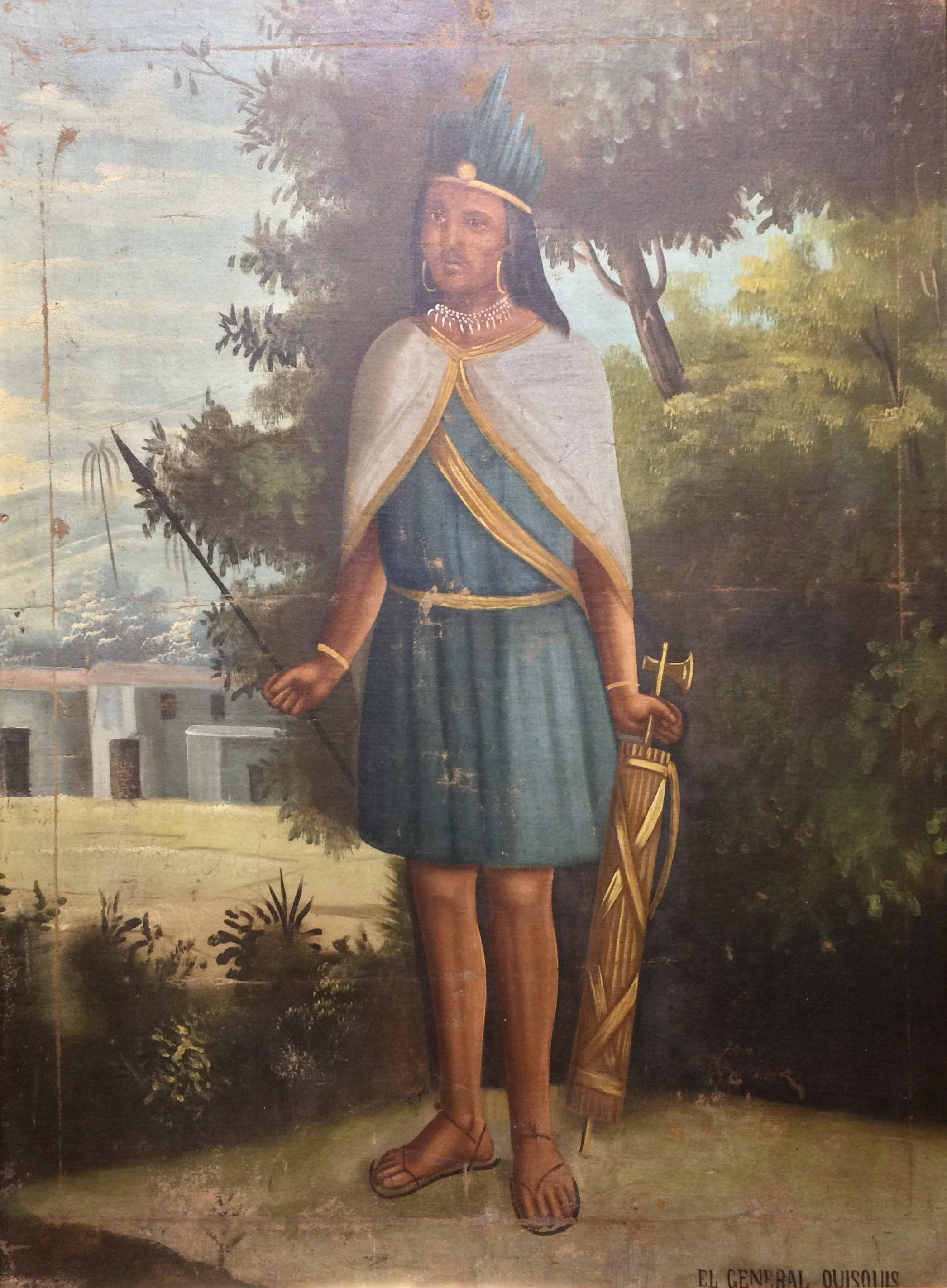
General Quisquis (19th century), oil painting. MuNa, Quito.

His first military experience was gained in the army of Huayna Capac, in campaigns in North, where he distinguished himself for his outstanding military skills.

On the death of the eleventh Sapa Inca, Quizquiz remained in the wake of his son Atahualpa, assuming the chief command of the armies of Quito, contrasted with those of Cuzco devoted to Huáscar.

Juan de Betanzos reports in his Narrative of the Incas that during the civil war Quizquiz led troops of 60,000 against Huáscar's troops.

As supreme commander he organized, together with another prestigious general Chalcuchimac, war against Cuzco. Quizquiz was responsible for the significant defeat and capture of Huáscar, where Huáscar planned to use a decoy advance guard that was to be later joined by the body of the army, however this decoy was destroyed before the rest of the army could join it. Defeating in several battles the armies of Huáscar, they achieved the final victory with the storming of the Inca Empire capital. As he was proceeding to the consolidation of power for Atahualpa in the region of Cuzco, the news came of the tragedy of Cajamarca and the capture of his master by the Spanish.

Atahualpa then had Chalcuchimac stay with half of his warriors in Jauja, and Quizquiz with the other half in Cuzco.

=== Meeting with the Spanish ===
Quizquiz was in Cuzco at the time of the Spaniards' arrival. Collecting the ransom, Atahualpa had convinced Francisco Pizarro to send three soldiers in the capital to personally check on the collection of gold. The three, Martín Bueno, Pedro Martin de Moguer and Pedro de Zárate, were treated honorably, despite their far from blameless behavior. The rude soldiers ventured to desecrate the temples and undermine the Virgins of the Sun, but the instructions from Atahualpa did not allow any appropriate measures to be taken against the three.

=== Fight against invaders ===
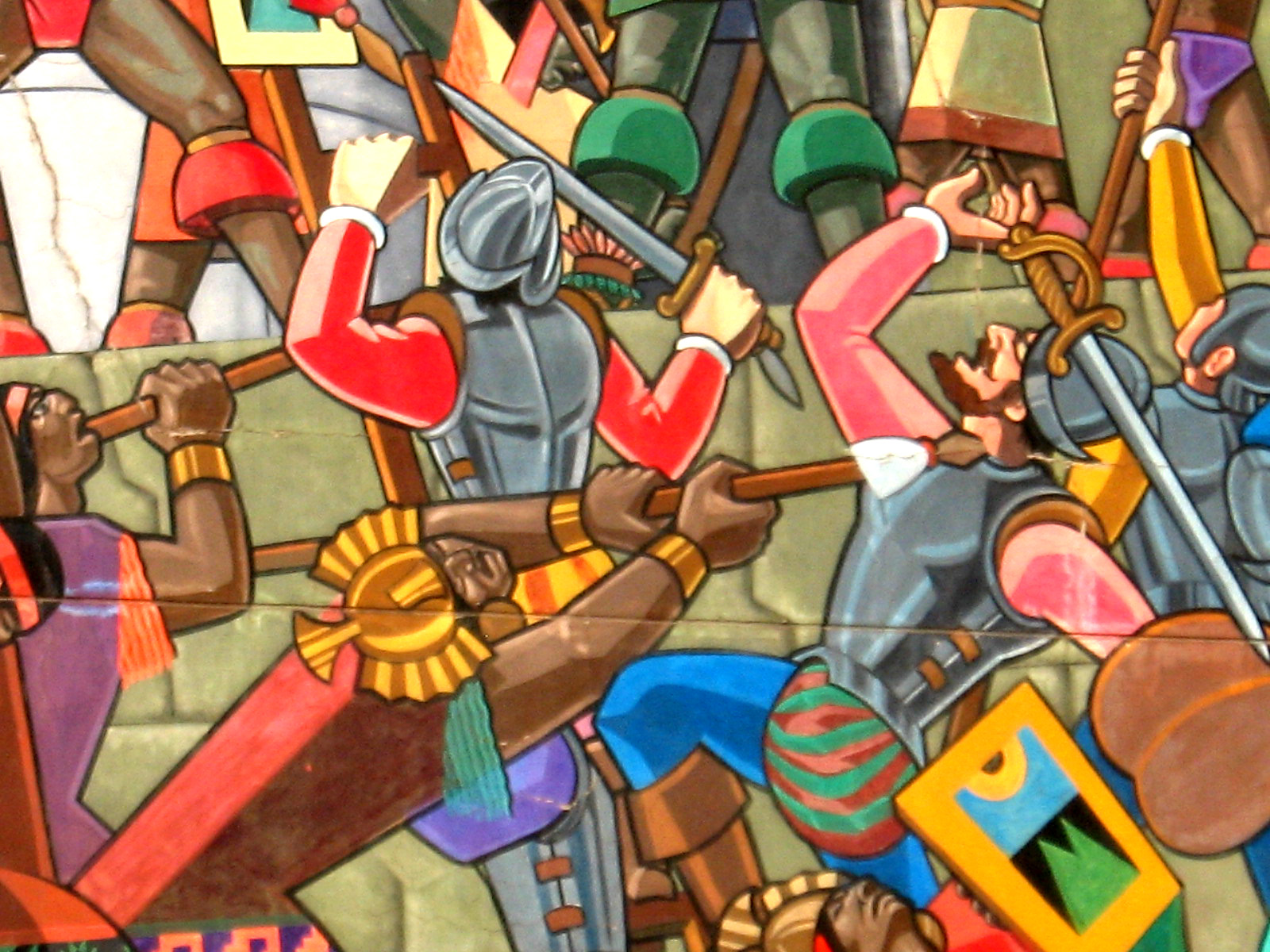
Inca commander Quizquiz fighting the Spaniards, possibly in the battle of Cuzco

Pizarro selected Túpac Huallpa as the next Inca, but soon this Inca died. Manco Inca then joined Pizarro on his march to Cuzco.

In November 1533, Quizquiz was defeated in the battle of Cuzco and abandoned the Inca capital. He decided to withdraw towards Quito.

The Spaniards occupied only three locations in Peru when the armies moved from Cuzco to Quito. One was the city of Cuzco itself, the second was the town of Jauja, entrusted to the treasurer Riquelme, and the third was the recent settlement of San Miguel which ensured the flow of reinforcements by sea. Quizquiz attacked Cuzco first, but Pizarro sent Almagro and fifty men to confront the attack. The Spaniards "killed and wounded many of them." Quizquiz then decided to attack the garrison of Jauja, on the road to Quito, but was "unable to prevail against the Spaniards" there either.

The rainy season had swelled rivers and was sufficient to demolish the bridges on the most tumultuous rivers to secure the rear from the arrival of Cuzco followers. The clash ensued between the army of Quito and fifty Spanish Jauja backed by thousands of indigenous friends. Quizquiz had developed strategies that worked against the Spanish, but he still had to learn to deal with the cavalry. His men carried out a pincer movement, but the impetus of the horses swept their ranks. The day, however, was not an easy one for the Spanish troops. Riquelme was himself wounded in the head and fell into the river, where he was rescued by a group of indian archers of the Antisuyu. One Spaniard was killed and almost all other reported injuries as their auxiliary natives were decimated by the troops of Quito.

Northern troops still managed to pass Jauja, while regretting that it could not conquer the city defended by a small garrison. Quizquiz had learnt from the experience and venturing in a ravine he fortified the slopes of the passage so that horses could not work, then he remained on hold.

Reinforcements from Cuzco came upon a few weeks later, under the command of Hernando de Soto and Diego de Almagro, accompanied by many Indians, sent by Manco Inca Yupanqui, elected meanwhile supreme Inca.

An assault by the Spaniards against the Incas failed due to Quizquiz's fortifications.

While worryingly studying what to do, the conquistador learned that the armies had abandoned their positions and headed north. Quizquiz, obviously, wanted to regain the region of Quito. The Spanish moved in pursuit, but proceeding with great caution and fighting only limited clashes with the marching rearguard, then, when it became clear that the enemy abandoned the region, desisted from following them.

Quizquiz had solved the immediate problem of the pursuers, but his difficulties were not over. He had to open a way through districts infested by hostile populations, related to the deceased Huáscar and hoping for a comeback thanks to the arrival of "white men" who, were seen as liberators.

Nevertheless, Quizquiz led the several thousand men who composed his army beyond the boundaries of the ancient kingdom of Quito, where he planned to find support and allies.

=== Last battle ===
Arriving in the land of Quito to organize resistance, he found that a Spanish contingent had preceded him, coming from San Miguel, under the leadership of Belalcázar. They were then followed by other armies commanded by Almagro and Pedro de Alvarado.

It was precisely the troops of Alvarado, who travelled the country looking for Rumiñawi and other opponents, to encounter the army of Quizquiz randomly. A detachment of them collided with a patrol of Quizquiz and their leader, Sotaurco, put to torture, was forced to reveal its location.

Convinced of holding the enemy, the Spaniards moved with haste. By forced march, travelling at night by the light of torches and stopping only for shoeing horses, they came unexpectedly in view of the marching army.

Quizquiz divided his army into two parts. One, with all the warriors, was launched on the slopes of a hill and stood in defence. The other, conducted by him personally, with most provisions and women, attempted a retreat.

As foreseen, the Spaniards launched the assault of enemy warriors, but those under the command of one of Atahualpa's brothers named Huaypalcon, kept them at bay by rolling down stones from the top of the hill.

During the night, the two Inca armies merged. The Spanish host pursued them, but were stopped at the crossing of a river that separated the contenders.

As the news came that a nearby indigenous detachment had killed and beheaded fourteen Spaniards who tried to reinforce their compatriots, they decided to retire.

Quizquiz had won, but this was to be his last battle.

=== Death ===
After encountering the armies of Almagro and Alavarado, Quizquiz still took part in many fights, but soon realized that the circle of the enemy was closing in on him.

Quizquiz may have attempted to prosecute a guerrilla war, but the area to which he aimed to lead his troops was wild and unexplored. Although they were guaranteed some security in case of attack, it involved the certainty of suffering hunger, given the large number of men to be supplied. Quizquiz's helpers were all opposed to this decision, but the stubborn general, stressed and angry for their resistance, accused them of cowardice.

According to Pedro Cieza de Leon, "Quizquiz went with the Huambracuna back to Quito, without having accomplished anything that he had intended. He had been praised for being a very brave and wise captain and of good judgment. The very Huambracuna who went with him killed him near Quito in the village of Tiamcambe." His warriors wanted peace so they could return home, but he refused. "Huaypalcon attacked him, and others joined in with battle axes and clubs and killed him."

"Thus fell the last of the two great officers of Atahualpa."

== See also ==
- Inca Empire
- Inca
- Conquistador
- Huáscar
- Atahualpa
- Chalcuchimac
- History of Peru
- History of Ecuador
