= Atoc =

Inca prince and general

Atoc or Atoq (Quechua for "fox") was an Inca prince, general and brother of the Inca emperor Huáscar.

After the death of Huáscar's father, Huayna Capac, Atoc was sent north (probably in 1529) to quell the separatists under Huáscar's half-brother Atahualpa. Atahualpa was defeated in the Battle of Chillopampa Plains and captured, but managed to escape and set up a new army.

Another battle was fought at Chimborazo, and this time Atahualpa emerged as victor and Atoc was captured. Atahualpa's general Chalkuchimac reportedly had Atoc mutilated and killed, either by having his head being put to use as a goldened chicha cup or his eyes being torn out and left alone on the field of defeat. His and his co-general Hango's hides were allegedly carved off and used as drums.

Shortly after, Atahualpa recaptured Tumebamba and Cajamarca and, in April of the following year, Atahualpa's generals seized Cuzco.
