= Quipaipán =

Quipaipán was the name of the plains west of Cusco in Peru, famous for the Battle of Quipaipán in 1532 which decided the fate of the Inca Empire.
