= Chalcuchima =

Inca general (died 1533)

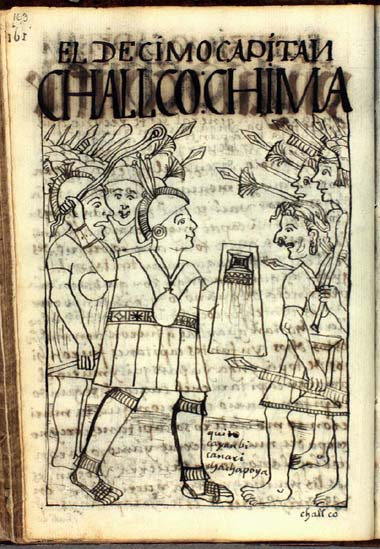
Chalkuchímac, Inca general and companion of Atahualpa

Chalcuchima (originally written Challcochima or Challcuchima, also called Chalcuchímac, Calcuchímac or Challkuchimaq in modern sources; born in the latter part of the 15th century; died Cajamarca, Peru, 1533) was, along with Quizquiz and Rumiñawi, one of the leading Inca generals of the north and a supporter of Atahualpa.

He was born in Quito in the north end of the Empire, and therefore swore his allegiance to Atahualpa in the division of the empire after the 1527 death of Huayna Capac and predicted heir Ninan Cuyochi died in smallpox in the north.

In the civil war that followed in 1529, he fought alongside Atahualpa and participated in defeating the forces of Atahualpa's half-brother Huáscar in the battle of Chimborazo and having Huáscar's general and brother Atoc captured, mutilated and killed. In April 1532, he and his companion defeated and captured Huáscar in the battle of Quipaipan.

Hernando Pizarro convinced Chalcuchimac, camped with an army of 35,000 in the Jauja Valley, that he was called to Cajamarca by Atahualpa after the Battle of Cajamarca. Chalcuchimac was also arrested by the Spaniards, who feared he might resume hostilities. Once Atahualpa had been executed on July 29, 1533, Pizarro advanced with his army of five hundred Spaniards toward Cuzco, accompanied by Chalcuchimac and then Manco Inca Yupanqui, after the death of Túpac Huallpa.

The natives attacked these troops several times with such spirit and discipline that they suspected Chialiquichiama was in secret communication with the Indians and directing their operations. There was a rumor that Quizquiz, the leader of the natives, had received communications from his imprisoned colleague Chialiquichiama letting him know the Spanish force was divided and how best to profit by that occasion. The suspicions, though not sufficiently proved to justify his fate, were enough to decide it, and Pizarro sentenced him to be burned alive. He was offered a less painful death if he would become a Christian, but he refused to be baptized, and died according to the sentence, remonstrating to the last moment against the injustice of his condemnation.

The Spaniards later routed the forces of Quizquiz and captured Cuzco in late 1533.
