= Ransom Room =

Cultural heritage site in Cajamurca, Peru

Coordinates: 7°09′28″S 78°31′00″W

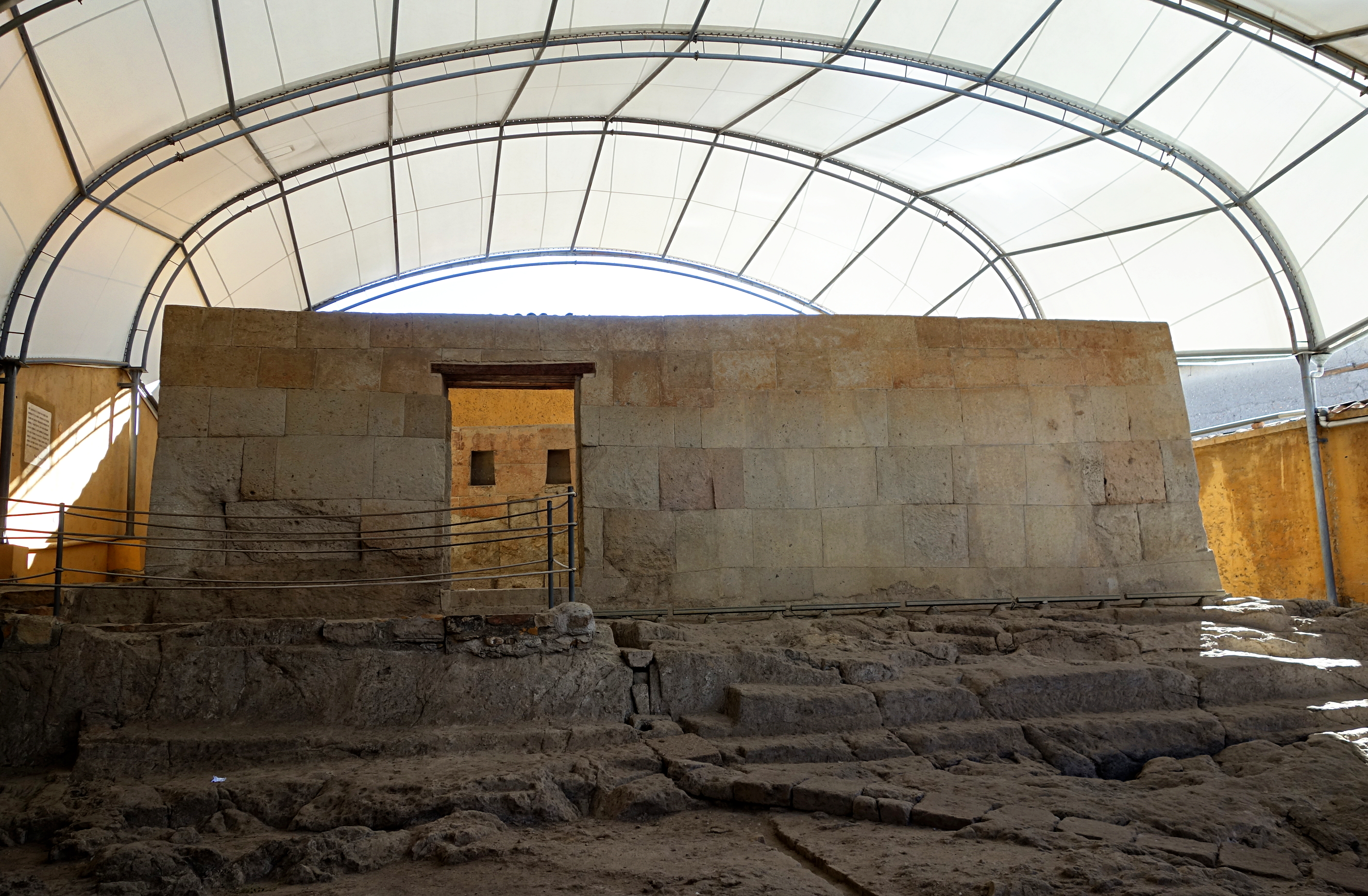
Exterior view of the building known as Ransom Room, in Cajamarca where the Inca Atahualpa was confined.

The Ransom Room (El Cuarto del Rescate) is a small building located in Cajamarca, Peru. It is considered to be the place where the Inca Empire came to an end with the capture and eventual execution of the Inca Emperor Atahualpa.

== Capture of Emperor Atahualpa (1532) ==
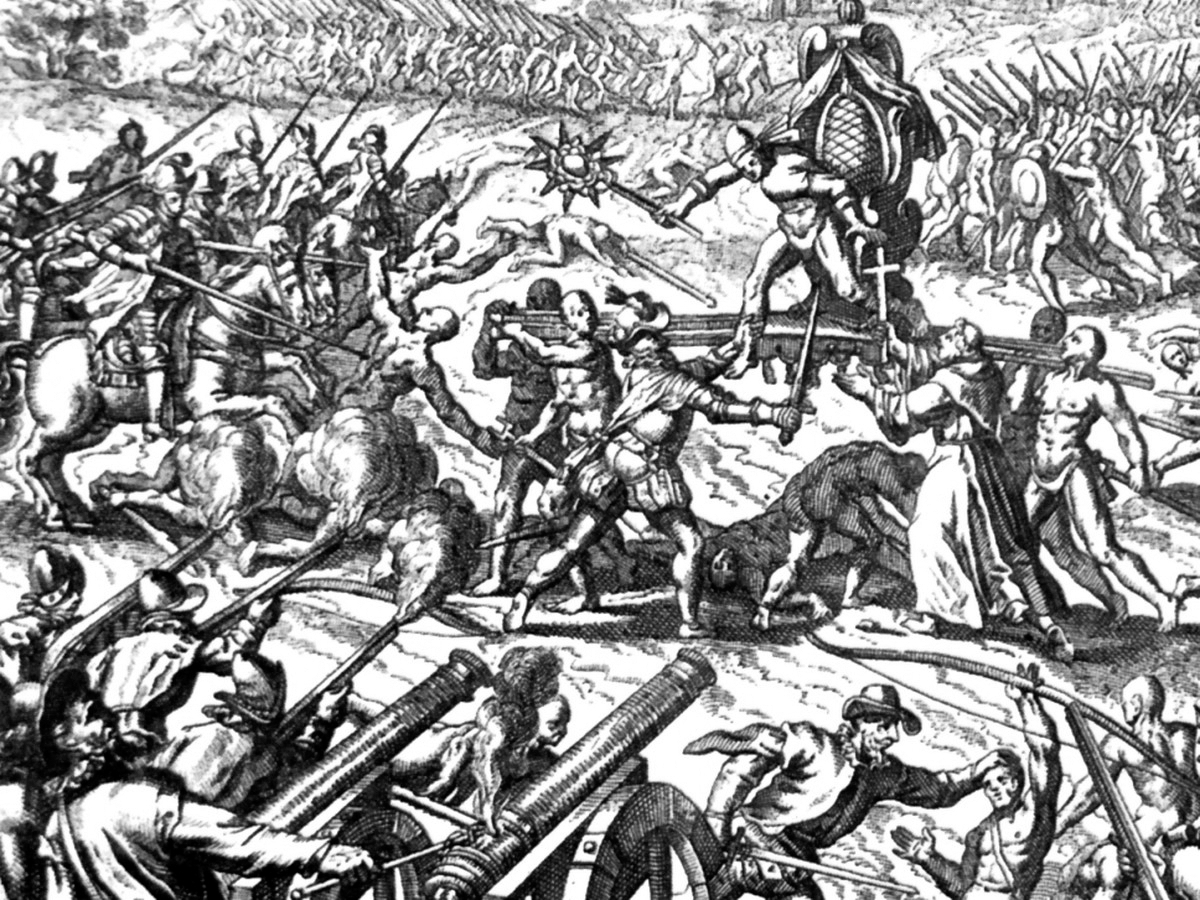
The Inca-Spanish confrontation in Cajamarca

When Francisco Pizarro arrived in Cajamarca on November 15, 1532, he sent a messenger to Atahualpa, proposing they meet in the main plaza. Pizarro decided to send a friar, Vincente de Valverde, along with an interpreter (Felipillo) to speak with Atahualpa. The next day, on November 16, 1532, Friar Valverde presented himself to Atahualpa and explained through the interpreter the mysteries of Catholic religion, and that, on account of their heathenism, the pope had granted Atahualpa's kingdom to the Spaniards. Atahualpa professed not to understand the tenor of this discourse, and would not resign his kingdom, saying he would "be no man's tributary." Upon hearing this, the friar gave a Bible to Atahualpa, who, after merely observing it and turning a few pages, threw the book on the floor. Atahualpa then demanded a full account of the presence of the Spaniards in his land. At this point Pizarro and his forces decided to come out on horseback with firearms, causing many of Atahualpa's army to flee upon hearing the sounds of artillery and arquebus. Many natives died as they tried to fight against the better-armed Spaniards. Thereafter, Pizarro went on to look for Atahualpa himself, who was shielded by his faithful nobles who, in the end, were also captured by the Spaniards.

Some scholars have stated that Vincente de Valverde did not signal the attack on the Incan.

It was during this time that Atahualpa gave orders for the execution of his half-brother, Huáscar, who he believed was an obstacle to his ruling of the empire. Atahualpa gave these orders, hoping to prevent Pizarro from carrying out his threat to "determine which of the two had best title to the sceptre of the Incas."

== Trial and execution of Atahualpa (1533) ==
After the battle of Cajamarca, Atahualpa offered Pizarro to buy his liberty by filling the room where he was kept prisoner with gold and the two following rooms with silver, up to the level of the reach of his arm. The room was 6.70 m (22 feet) long and 5.18 m wide (17 feet), while the red line marking the height of the Inca's reach, was 2.75 m (9 feet) high. Atahualpa also offered to twice fill a smaller room with silver, asking for two months to do so.

The total collection of the gold, after being melted down into standard ingots, and before division amongst the Spaniards, amounted to 1,326,539 pesos de oro, worth 15,500,000 in 1847 U.S. dollars, or more than half a billion dollars today. The silver amounted to 51,610 marks. Some of the most beautiful articles were saved for the emperor's royal fifth, which included vases, imitations of plants and animals, and a fountain.

The Inca now demanded to be set free. Diego de Almagro demanded the Inca's death, necessary for peace and in the interests of the Spanish crown, though Pizarro and Hernando de Soto were reluctant. Pizarro finally conceded to a trial, acting as a judge alongside Almagro. The twelve charges included usurpation of the crown, assassination of his brother Huáscar, squandering public revenues, idolatry, adultery, and attempting to incite an insurrection. He was found guilty and sentenced to be burned alive that night. Father Vincente de Valverde signed the judgement stating, "in his opinion, the Inca, at all events, deserved death."

Atahualpa turned to Pizarro and exclaimed, "What have I done, or my children, that I should meet such a fate? And from your hands, too, you, who have met with friendship and kindness from my people, with whom I have shared my treasures, who have received nothing but benefits from my hands!"

Two hours after sunset on 29 Aug. 1533, the Inca was prepared to be burned at the stake, when Friar Valverde offered death by garrote, if Atahualpa would consent to be baptized. The Inca agreed, assuming the name Francisco Atahualpa in honor of Francisco Pizarro. His last requests to Pizarro were that his remains be transported to Quito, and that he have compassion on his children.

After Atahualpa was executed, the end of the "Tahuantinsuyo" (Inca Empire) was near, with the Spanish conquest of Peru.

== See also ==
- History of Peru
- Spanish conquest of the Inca Empire

== Bibliography ==
- Hemming, John. The Conquest of the Incas.
- Prescott, William H. The Discovery and Conquest of Peru
