= Pedro Cieza de León =

Spanish conquistador and chronicler of Peru

- Pedro de Cieza de León
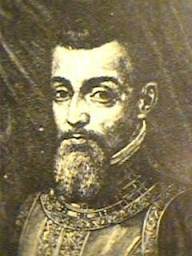
- Born: 1518 or 1520; Llerena, Extremadura, Spain
- Died: 2 July 1554; Seville, Spain
- Scientific career
- Fields: History, geography, ethnography, political science, botany, zoology

Signature
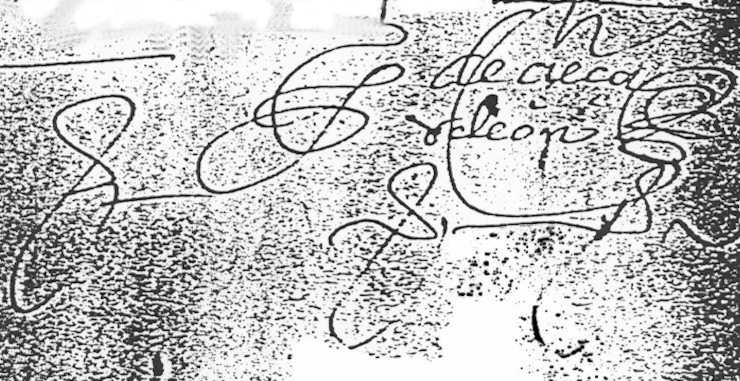

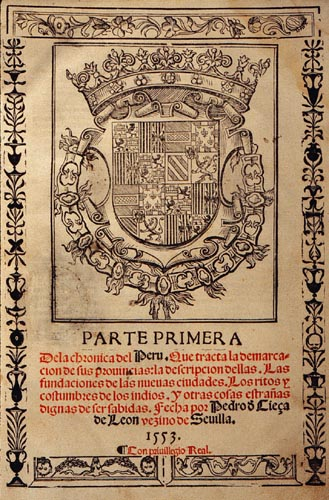
First part of Crónicas del Perú

Pedro Cieza de León (Llerena, Spain c. 1518 or 1520 – Seville, 2 July 1554) was a Spanish conquistador and chronicler of Peru and Popayán. He is known primarily for his extensive work, Crónicas del Perú (The Chronicle of Peru), which has been described as "fundamental to an understanding of Inca history, as he was the first to consider the structure and organization of the Inca Empire." He wrote this book in four parts, but only the first was published during his lifetime; the remaining sections were not published until the 19th and 20th centuries.

== Early life ==
His father, Lope de León, was a shopkeeper in the town, and his mother, Leonor de Cazalla, was a native of Llerena. There is scant documentary evidence of the young Cieza de León’s childhood, and little is known of his early life before his voyage to the Americas. Given the fact that he left home at 13, it is unlikely that Cieza de León received more than a rudimentary education.

In 1536, in Córdoba, at 16 or 18, Cieza de León was greatly surprised to learn of the discovery of the land of the Incas and so decided to go to Seville to embark on his journey to South America, to see for himself the artifacts of precious metals which had been brought to Spain from Cajamarca.

In light of the prohibition of entry into the Spanish colonies for Jews and Jewish converts to Catholicism, Alonso López and Luis de Torres attested for Cieza de León that he was not prohibited. Pedro López de Cazalla, secretary of Spanish conquistador Francisco Pizarro, conqueror of the Incan Empire, was also his first cousin.

== In South America ==
Cieza de León participated in various expeditions throughout South America and he saw the deplorable state into which the Inca Empire (Tawantinsuyu) had fallen. He made note of the sharply reduced population of almost all areas as a result of the Spanish conquest, as also their violence towards the local population. He complained about the state of affairs, writing:

I do not approve of the overthrow of power in any way, but I still mourn the extortion and ill-treatment inflicted by the Spaniards on the Indians, enslaved by cruelty, despite their nobility and the high dignity of their people. Because of this, all these valleys, which were densely populated in the past, are now almost deserted, as many people know.

During Cieza's travels in Peru, he helped found a number of cities. These activities include the following:

- 1536 and 1537: Expedition to San Sebastián de Buenavista and to Urute with Alonso de Cáceres.
- 1539: Foundation of San Ana de los Caballeros (Popayán Province), with Jorge Robledo.
- 1540: Foundation of Cartago (Popayán Province).
- 1541: Foundation of Antioquía (Popayán Province).
- He took possession of an encomienda in Cartagena of Indies, which he granted to Sebastián de Belalcázar.
- 1547: Cieza de León participated in missions headed by Pedro de la Gasca in support of the royalist campaign against Gonzalo Pizarro's rebellion.
- 1548: He reached the "City of Kings" (present-day Lima), where he started his career as a writer and official chronicler of the New World. During the following two years he traveled across the Peruvian territory, collecting interesting information he would later use to develop his works.
- 1550: He visited the city of Cusco in the month of August, after the harvests had been got in, and where he witnessed many customs.

== Later life and the fate of his writings ==
Cieza de León returned to Seville, Spain, in 1551 and married a woman named Isabel López de Abreu. In this city he published, in 1553, the first part of the chronicles of Peru (Primera Parte). He died the following year, leaving the rest of his work unpublished. His Second Part of Chronicles of Peru, describing the Incas, was translated by Clements Markham and published in 1871. In 1909, the fourth part of his chronicle, focusing on the civil wars among the Spanish conquerors, was published under the title Third Book of the Peruvian Civil Wars. The third part of Cieza de León's Crónicas del Perú, which examined the discovery and conquest of Peru by the Spaniards, was considered by historians to be lost. The document eventually turned up in a Vatican library, and historian Francesca Cantù published a Spanish version of the text in 1979.

The Chronicle of Peru itself, superbly planned and structured, consists of four parts:

- The first part (1553), published during the author's lifetime, consists of a general geographical overview, a description of the customs of the Indians and the founding of cities by the Spaniards in Peru, Popayán, Charcas and Chile. From this edition, a second printing was made in Antwerp in 1554.

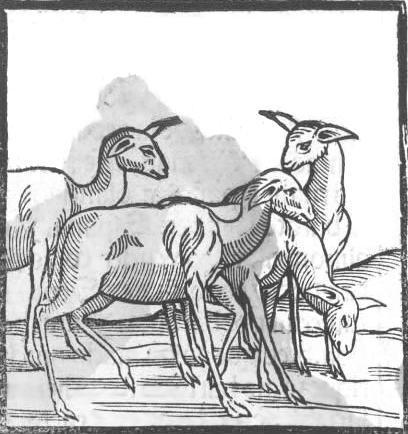
First image of llamas seen in Europe, as described in Pedro Cieza de León's Chronicle of Peru (1553)

The distribution of the First Part of the Chronicle of Peru is known from Cieza's will: in Medina del Campo Juan de Espinosa sold one hundred and thirty copies, in Toledo thirty - Juan Sanchez de Andrade, and eight - Diego Gutierrez from Los Rios de Cordoba. Juan de Casalla from Seville contracted to sell more than a hundred copies. Books were also sent to Honduras and Santo Domingo.

- The second part, On the Dominion of the Incas of Yupanqui, was published post-mortem in 1871, being a translation of the original work. The original work was published in Madrid in 1877, with an additional printing in 1883. The work is a fundamental chronicle of the period of Inca rule in Peru. Almost all of this part, as the famous historian Marcos Jiménez de la Espada later noted, "was fraudulently appropriated by one of our most famous chroniclers: a literary crime that entailed as a consequence that the humble and industrious soldier, conquistador and explorer of the first, bypassed the entire country, which he described and delved into all the events, which he told about in his wonderful work, which, before anyone else managed to understand and organize the mysterious chronicles of the times preceding the Conquest, found itself replaced by the one who, until today, had the upper-hand among those who wrote about Peruvian antiquities, even by Inca Garcilaso de la Vega."

Concerning the work, The Dominion of the Incas, Raul Porras Barrenechea said: "It is admirable that in such a turbulent time as the years from 1548 to 1550, when Cieza was in Peru, he was able to write a work so thorough, so reliably and reliably documented, and such maturity, about the history and institutions of the Incas. The history of the Incas was a natural given for Cieza, as an adult. No one can dispute his primacy regarding the Incan power. The history of the Castilian chronicler immediately introduced the Incas into world history."

- The third part is an extensive narrative that describes the Discovery and Conquest of Peru, although only a small part of it has survived, made famous in 1946 by the Lima newspaper El Mercurio Peruano and the researcher Rafael Loredo, who discovered it in the Escorial Library (Madrid, Spain). A significant part of it was included in his General History by Antonio de Herrera y Tordesillas.
- The fourth part, entitled Civil Wars in Peru, is the most extensive. It is divided into five books:
  - "War of Salinas", which concerns the confrontation between Francisco Pizarro and Diego de Almagro, and ends with his death;
  - "The Chupas War", which summarized the last years of Pizarro's life, the reign of Vaca de Castro and the defeat of Diego de Almagro "the Younger";
  - "War in Quito", which tells the story of the revolt of the grantees of the encomienda system, called encomenderos, under the command of Gonzalo Pizarro and the death of Viceroy Blasco Nunez Vela.

These three books were published in the 19th century, and it is unknown whether the author completed the last two: "War in Huarino" and "War in Jaquihaguana". The manuscripts of the last two books have not been found.

Pedro Cieza de León's historical works led the historian Raúl Porras to coin him the phrase: "the premier chronicler of the Indies."

== Significance ==
Though his works are historical and narrate the events of the Spanish conquest of Peru and the civil wars among the Spaniards, much of their importance lies in his detailed descriptions of geography, ethnography, flora and fauna. He was the first European to describe some native Peruvian animal species and vegetables.

== Works ==
- Cieza de León, Pedro de. The Second Part of the Chronicle of Peru, translated by Clements R. Markham. London: Hakluyt Society, 1883. (reissued by Cambridge University Press, 2010. ISBN 978-1-108-01161-7)
- Cieza de León, Pedro de. The Travels of Pedro de Cieza de León, AD 1532–50, Contained in the First Part of His Chronicle of Peru, translated by Clements R. Markham. London: Hakluyt Society, 1883. (reissued by Cambridge University Press, 2010. ISBN 978-1-108-01334-5)
- Cieza de León, Pedro de. The War of Las Salinas, translated by Clements R. Markham. London: Hakluyt Society, 1923 (1883).
- Cieza de León, Pedro de. The War of Quito, translated by Clements R. Markham. London: Hakluyt Society, 1913 (1883).
- Cieza de León, Pedro de. The War of Chupas, translated by Clements R. Markham. London: Hakluyt Society, 1917 (1883).
- Cieza de León, Pedro de. The Incas of Pedro de Cieza de León, translated by Harriet de Onis. Norman, OK: University of Oklahoma Press, 1959.
- Cieza de León, Pedro de. The Discovery and Conquest of Peru: Chronicles of the New World Encounter, edited and translated by Alexandra Parma Cook and Noble David Cook. Durham, NC: Duke University Press, 1998.

== Sources ==
- Aguilar Rodas, Raúl. "Pedro Cieza de Leon". Real Academia de la Historia (in Spanish).
- Cook, Noble David, ed. (1998). The Discovery and Conquest of Peru: Chronicles of the New World Encounter. Duke University Press.
- Von Hagen, Victor Wolfgang, ed. (1959). The Incas of Pedro de Cieza de León. Translated by Onis, Harriet de. University of Oklahoma Press.
