= Huáscar =

Sapa Inca of the Inca empire from 1527 to 1532

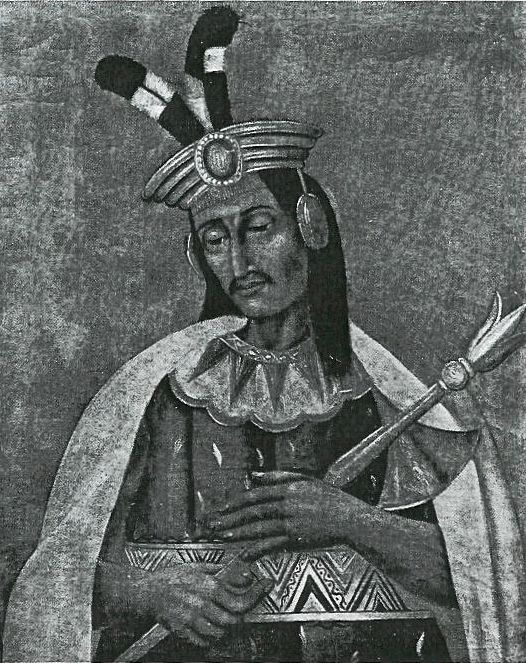
- Twilight of Ancient Peru - the glory and decline of the Inca Empire by Lieselotte and Theo Engl (1969), photograph of original portrait located in the Ethnological Museum of Berlin.

Sapa Inca of the Inca Empire
- Reign: 1527 – 1532
- Predecessor: Huayna Capac; Ninan Cuyochi (only a few days)
- Successor: Atahualpa
- Born: Before 1527; Huascarpata, Inca Empire
- Died: 1532; Cusco, Inca Empire
- Spouse: Chuqui Huipa
- Issue: Leonor Curicuillor
- Dynasty: Hanan Qusqu
- Father: Huayna Capac

Huáscar (/ˈwɑːskɑːr/) (Classical Quechua: Waskhar, pronounced [waskʰar]) also Guazcar (before 1527 – 1532) was Sapa Inca of the Inca Empire from 1527 to 1532. He succeeded his father, Huayna Capac and his brother Ninan Cuyochi, both of whom died of smallpox during the same year while campaigning near Quito. From 1529 to 1532, Huáscar fought the Inca civil war against his half-brother Atahualpa, who prevailed and captured Huáscar. Shortly thereafter, Atahualpa was captured by the Spanish conquistador Francisco Pizarro and had Huáscar killed.

== Biography ==
The origin of his name is uncertain. One story is that Huáscar was named after a huge gold chain that was made to mark the occasion of his birth. "Huasca" is Quechua for "chain". Because his father did not think "chain" was an appropriate name for a prince, he added an r to the end of the name to make "Huáscar". Another story is that his name is from his birthplace, Huascarpata.

The actual events that brought about Huáscar's succession are unclear. Conflicting factions and the fact that the Spanish chroniclers' accounts stemmed from the winners of the ensuing civil war led to conflicting versions of what actually happened. Thus, although Huayna Capac named the infant Ninan Cuyochi as his first heir, sources differ as to whether the boy died first, was unacceptable because of an unfavorable divination or even if Huayna simply forgot that he had named him when asked to confirm the nomination. In any event, a second choice was requested and again sources vary. He may have named Huáscar's half-brother Atahualpa who then refused or named Huáscar himself or perhaps even the nobles put forward Huáscar. Whatever the truth, the result of Huáscar's accession and the dispute over it before and after led to civil war between Huáscar (made emperor by a faction based in Cuzco) and Atahualpa (backed by leaders who were based in the north with Huayna).

The Spanish chronicler Juan de Betanzos who provided information pertaining to the Huáscar-Atahualpa civil war, outlines Huáscar's tyranny. It is, however, a very biased account, as Betanzos' wife, on whose testimony much of his chronicle is based, was previously married to Atahualpa. Betanzos outlines how Huáscar would seize his lords' wives if they took his fancy. More importantly, he seized both the Lands of the Previous Incas and the Lands of the Sun. In Inca society, the lands of previous dead Incas remained part of their household to support their divine-like cult. Similarly, lands were reserved for the worship of the Sun. Thus, Huáscar's seizure represented his disrespect and insensitivity for Inca religion.

Huáscar then declared war on Atahualpa. The battles reported by Betanzos talk of Quizquiz (Atahualpa's commander) leading armies of 60,000 men against armies of 60,000 men supporting Huáscar. Betanzos' account also enlightens on the bloody nature of Inca wars. Atahualpa's punishment of the Cañaris saw him rip the hearts of their tribal chiefs and force their followers to eat them.

Huáscar was defeated in the Battle of Chimborazo and the Battle of Quipaipán. Huáscar was made prisoner and Atahualpa's generals Quizquiz and Chalcuchímac occupied Cuzco.

The war had Atahualpa in the clear ascendancy on Spanish conquistador Francisco Pizarro's arrival. However it was partly because of the ongoing civil war that Pizarro was able to triumph. Firstly, the civil war had depleted the Inca armies. Secondly, disunity can be demonstrated by Huáscar's celebrations and in the celebrations of the province of Cuzco (loyal to Huáscar) at Atahualpa's capture.

Furthermore, Atahualpa had Huáscar killed so that he was not in a position to offer Pizarro a larger ransom of gold than Atahualpa was offering for his own release. Atahualpa stated: "How shall my brother get so much gold and silver for himself; I would give twice as much as he can, if they would kill him and leave me as lord."

== See also ==
- Huascarán, highest peak in Peru and named for Huáscar
