= History of the Incas =

Incan civilization

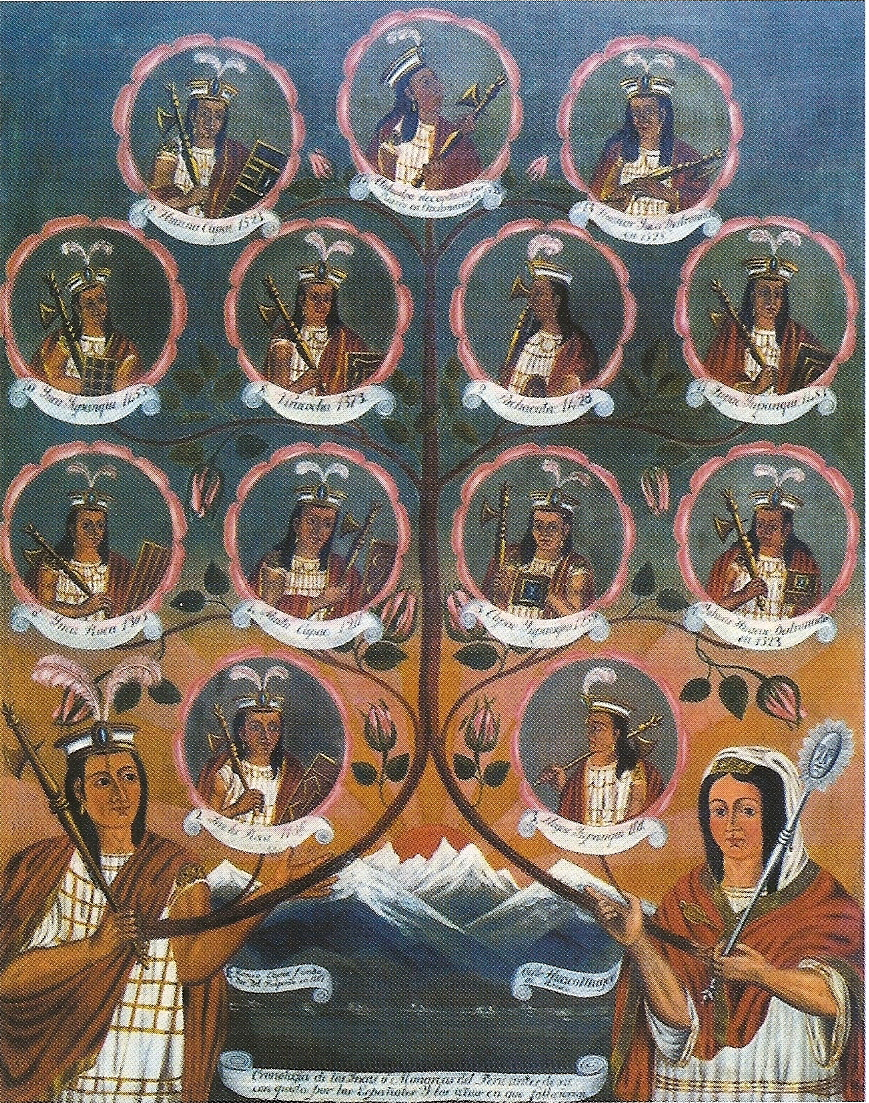
"Sapa Inkakuna". Painting from the 18th century. It portrays the Inca royal lineage and belongs to the Cusco School, unknown author.

The Incas were most notable for establishing the Inca Empire which was centered in modern-day Peru and Chile. It was about 4,000 kilometres (2,500 mi) from the northern to southern tip. The Inca Empire lasted from 1438 to 1533. It was the largest Empire in America throughout the Pre-Columbian era. The Inca state was originally founded by Manco Cápac in the early 1200s, and is known as the Kingdom of Cuzco. Under subsequent rulers, through strategic alliances and conquests, it expanded beyond Cusco and into the Sacred Valley. Their territory then rapidly grew under the 9th Sapa Inca (emperor), Pachacuti and his descendents.

Over the course of the Inca Empire, the Inca used conquest and peaceful assimilation to incorporate the territory of modern-day Peru, followed by a large portion of western South America, into their empire, centered on the Andean mountain range. However, shortly after the Inca Civil War, the last Sapa Inca of the Inca Empire, Atahualpa, was captured and killed on the orders of the conquistador Francisco Pizarro, marking the beginning of Spanish rule. The remnants of the empire retreated to the remote jungles of Vilcabamba and established the small Neo-Inca State, which was conquered by the Spanish in 1572.

The Quechua name for the empire after the reforms under Pachacuti was Tawantin Suyu, which can be translated The Four Regions or The Four United Regions. Before the Quechua spelling reform it was written in Spanish as Tahuantinsuyo. Tawantin is a group of four things (tawa "four" with the suffix -ntin which names a group); suyu means "region" or "province". (Note: Tawantin suyu derives from the Quechua "tawa" (four), to which the suffix "-ntin" (together or united) is added, followed by "suyu" (region or province), which roughly renders as "The land of the four parts together".) The empire was divided into four suyus, whose corners met at the capital, Cuzco (Qosqo)

== Historical sources ==
=== Spanish chronicles ===
The first written traces of the Inca Empire are the chronicles recorded by various European authors (later there were mestizo and indigenous chroniclers who also compiled the history of the Incas); these authors compiled "Inca history" based on accounts collected throughout the empire. The first chroniclers had to face various difficulties in order to translate Inca history since, in addition to a language barrier, they faced the problem of interpreting a way of seeing the world totally different from the one they were used to. This led to the existence of several contradictions between the colonial texts, an example of this is presented by the chronologies of the Inca rulers; thus, in many chronicles, the same feats, facts and episodes are attributed to different rulers.

Regarding the chronicles of the Inca Empire, its authors had certain interests when writing them. In the case of the Spanish chroniclers, their interest was to legitimize the conquest through history, for this reason, in many chronicles, it is pointed out that the Incas conquered using violence entirely and therefore had no rights over the conquered territories. In another case, chroniclers linked to the Catholic Church sought to legitimize evangelization by describing the Inca religion as the work of the devil, the Incas as sons of Noah, and trying to identify the Inca deities with biblical beliefs or European folklore. Likewise, there were other mestizo and indigenous chroniclers who also had an interest in extolling the empire or one of the Panakas with which they were related, such as the case of Inca Garcilaso de la Vega, who in his work "Comentarios Reales de los Incas" showed an idealized Inca Empire where poverty didn't exist, wealth was distributed, and resources were exploited rationally.

=== Incan sources ===
The ayllus and Panakas had special songs through which they narrated their history, these songs were performed in certain ceremonies in front of the Sapa Inca. These stories, by way of collective memory, constitute the first historical records collected in the chronicles. Another resource used to record history were some cloaks and boards that contained paintings representing the stories of the Inca rulers and the biography of each of them. These objects were kept in a place called Puquincancha in Cusco, under the care of specialists in interpreting them. It is known that Viceroy Francisco de Toledo sent King Philip II four cloths illustrating the life of the Incas, adding that the native painters didn't have the same curiosity as those from Spain.

In addition, some past events were stored in the quipus, although it isn't known how these systems of cords and knots could be used to store historical events, there are several chronicles that describe that the quipus were used to evoke the feats of the rulers.

In general, in the Inca Empire there was a strong emphasis on preserving notable events and facts in the historical records. However, precision wasn't always valued, and some rulers might have intentionally excluded or distorted information that they deemed undesirable. María Rostworowski calls this quality of Inca history a "political amnesia" that was assumed by the common people but was remembered by the affected Panakas or ayllus, a factor that contributed to future contradictions in European chronicles about the Incas.

After the meeting of the Hispanic and Andean culture, writing was established as the means of transmission and recording of information. In addition, a process of "miscegenation" and syncretism began that gave rise to the reinvention of traditions and the creation of others. All these reinventions are part of a natural process in all cultures, but to understand Inca history it is necessary to differentiate which are the syncretic or invented aspects and which are not. The problem of differentiating these aspects deepens when we turn to Andean communities themselves as sources. Archaeologist Terence D'Altroy cautions that there are many writings, tales, and stories that are subject to suspicion due to having been shaped by half a millennium of Christian and Spanish cultural influences, as well as information just being lost over time.

== Chronology ==
Expansion of the Inca Empire according to the chronology of Howland Rowe. 1463 was set as the year for the co-rule of Tupac Yupanqui.

Chronology according to the Peruvian historian José Antonio del Busto Duthurburu.

		Year	Notes
Legendary Period		1285	Foundation of Cusco.
Legendary Period		1305	Death of Manco Capac and rule of Sinchi Roca.
Protohistoric or Monarchical Period	Hurin Cusco	1320	Lloque Yupanqui, Mayta Capac and Capac Yupanqui.
Protohistoric or Monarchical Period	Hanan Cusco	1370	Inca Roca, Yawar Waqaq and Viracocha Inca.
Historic or Imperial Period	Pachacuti	1425	Co-rule of Amaru in 1450
Historic or Imperial Period	Tupac Yupanqui	1471	
Historic or Imperial Period	Huayna Capac	1488	Until his death in 1528.

Chronology based on the works "Suma y Narración de los Incas" by Juan de Betanzos (1551) and "El Señorío de los Incas" by Pedro Cieza de León (1880)

Order	Sapa Inca	Years	Order	Sapa Inca	Years
I	Manco Capac	1240-1260	VII	Yawar Waqaq	1360-1380
II	Sinchi Roca	1260-1280	VIII	Viracocha Inca	1380-1400
III	Lloque Yupanqui	1280-1300	IX	Pachacuti	1400-1440
IV	Mayta Capac	1300-1320	X	Tupac Yupanqui	1440-1480
V	Capac Yupanqui	1320-1340	XI	Huayna Capac	1480-1523
VI	Inca Roca	1340-1360	XII	Inti Cusi Hualpa (Huascar)	1523-1532

Chronology according to the "Miscelánea antártica" by Miguel Cabello de Balboa (1586). It is highly criticized for the length of several reigns and that it doesn't coincide with archaeological studies. Includes the correction by Howland Rowe, accepted by Kauffmann Doig, Ann Kendall, Alden Mason, and Robert Deviller. Rowe's correction of Balboa, despite its wide use, has also been criticised for lack of coincidence with archeological data and speculative nature, Rowe himself having admitted the latter point of criticism. According to Catherine Julien, the "dates themselves are not important", and Rowe's chronology, while "many students of the Incas have used those dates uncritically", served to "suggest a plausible chronology" since "if the rulers ruled and succeeded each other in the order given, then any dates that reflect a time span that is not out of line for real people who lived for some period of time after adulthood would be plausible".

Order	Sapa Inca	Date	Length	Revision	Order	Sapa Inca	Date	Length	Revision
I	Manco Capac	945-1006	61 years	1200-1230	VIII	Viracocha Inca	1386-1438	50 years	1410-1438
II	Sinchi Roca	1006-1083	77 years	1230-1260	IX	Pachacuti	1438-1473	35 years	1438-1471
III	Lloque Yupanqui	1083-1161	78 years	1260-1300	X	Tupac Yupanqui	1473-1493	20 years	1471-1493
IV	Mayta Capac	1161-1226	65 years	1300-1320	XI	Huayna Capac	1493-1525	32 years	1493-1528
V	Capac Yupanqui	1226-1306	80 years	1320-1350	XII	Huascar	1525-1532	7 years	1528-1532
VI	Inca Roca	1306-1356	50 years	1350-1380	XIII	Atahualpa	1532-1533	1 year	
VII	Yawar Waqaq	1356-1386	30 years	1380-1410					

According to María Rostworowski, the victory against the Chanka took place in the early years of the 15th century.

Pachacuti	40 years
Pachacuti & Amaru Yupanqui	5 – 6 years
Pachacuti & Tupac Yupanqui	14 – 15 years
Tupac Inca Yupanqui	10 years
Huayna Capac	50 years

== Origins ==
=== Legends ===
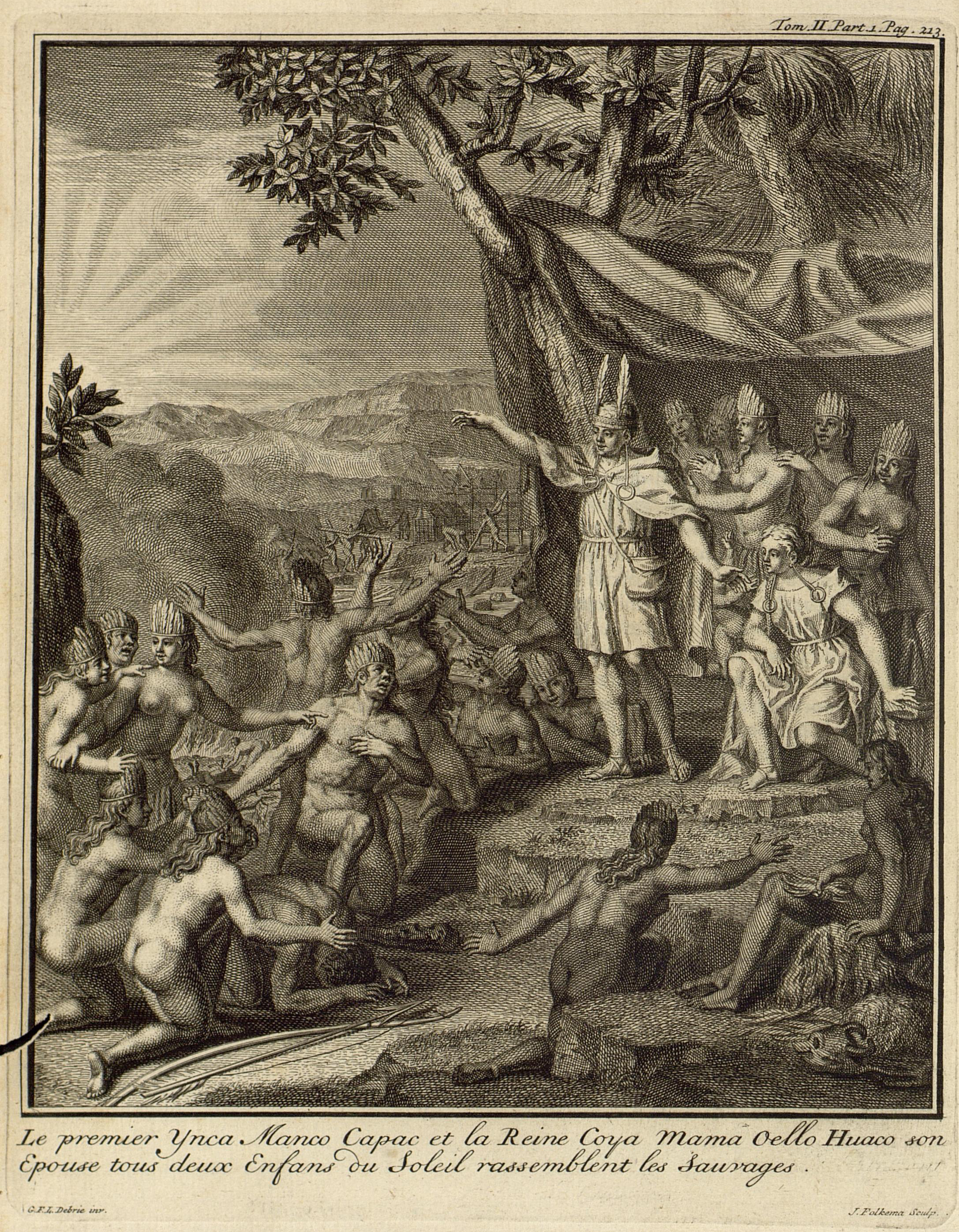
"The first Ynca Manco Capac and Queen Coya Mama Ocllo Huaco her Husband both children of the Sun gather the savages". Illustration of 1752, extracted from the Voyage dans l'Amérique Méridionale.

==== The Ayar Brothers ====
Four pairs of brothers and their tribes left Pacaritambo: Ayar Cachi and Mama Huaco, Ayar Uchu and Mama Ipacura or Cura, Ayar Auca and Mama Raua, and Ayar Manco and Mama Ocllo. From the summit of the Wanakawri mountain, Ayar Cachi with his sling shot a stone against a hill and turned it into a quebrada, then he did the same with three more hills, completing the four cardinal points. His brothers saw his strength and, mistrusting him, they sent him to bring gold objects from Pacaritambo and locked him up with a large stone.

After getting rid of Ayar Cachi, they lived in Wanakawri for a year, they planted potatoes on the back of the mountain, and Mama Huaco became another wife of Ayar Manco. After the year, they moved to a hill called Matagua, from there they looked at the valley of Cuzco, and the inhabitants and subjects of Alcaviza, who was the chief of a village with 30 houses, all thatched and very dilapidated.

They deemed it a good place, so they agreed to conquer and populate it, they also agreed that one of them had to stay in Wanakawri to become a huaca and intercede with the Sun, their father, to increase their children and send good times. Ayar Uchu grew large wings and offered himself, he flew and after being in the "heavens", returned and told Ayar Manco to rename himself Manco Capac, because that is what the Sun commands, and to go the place they had seen because the residents would receive them well; he also gave him his wife Mama Cura to serve him. Having said all that, Ayar Uchu turned into a stone figure with wings. Manco Capac, Ayar Auca, the four women and their respective ayllus, went to see Alcaviza. Before entering his land, in a nearby town called Acamama, Mama Huaco hit a man with a bolas, killing him instantly, and then ripping out his heart, the people feared her and fled to the valley of Guallas. From there the group walked and spoke with Alcaviza, who accepted them. And so the city of Cuzco was founded, the brothers made their house for them and the four women, with seeds that they brought from Pacaritambo they dedicated themselves to planting corn. Ayar Auca died after two years and had no children; while Manco Capac and Mama Ocllo only had one, Sinchi Roca.

This was as told by Juan de Betanzos, the different versions of this story are related by: Bernabé Cobo, Pedro Sarmiento de Gamboa, Martin de Murúa, Pedro Cieza de León, Juan de Santa Cruz Pachacuti, and Cristóbal de Molina.

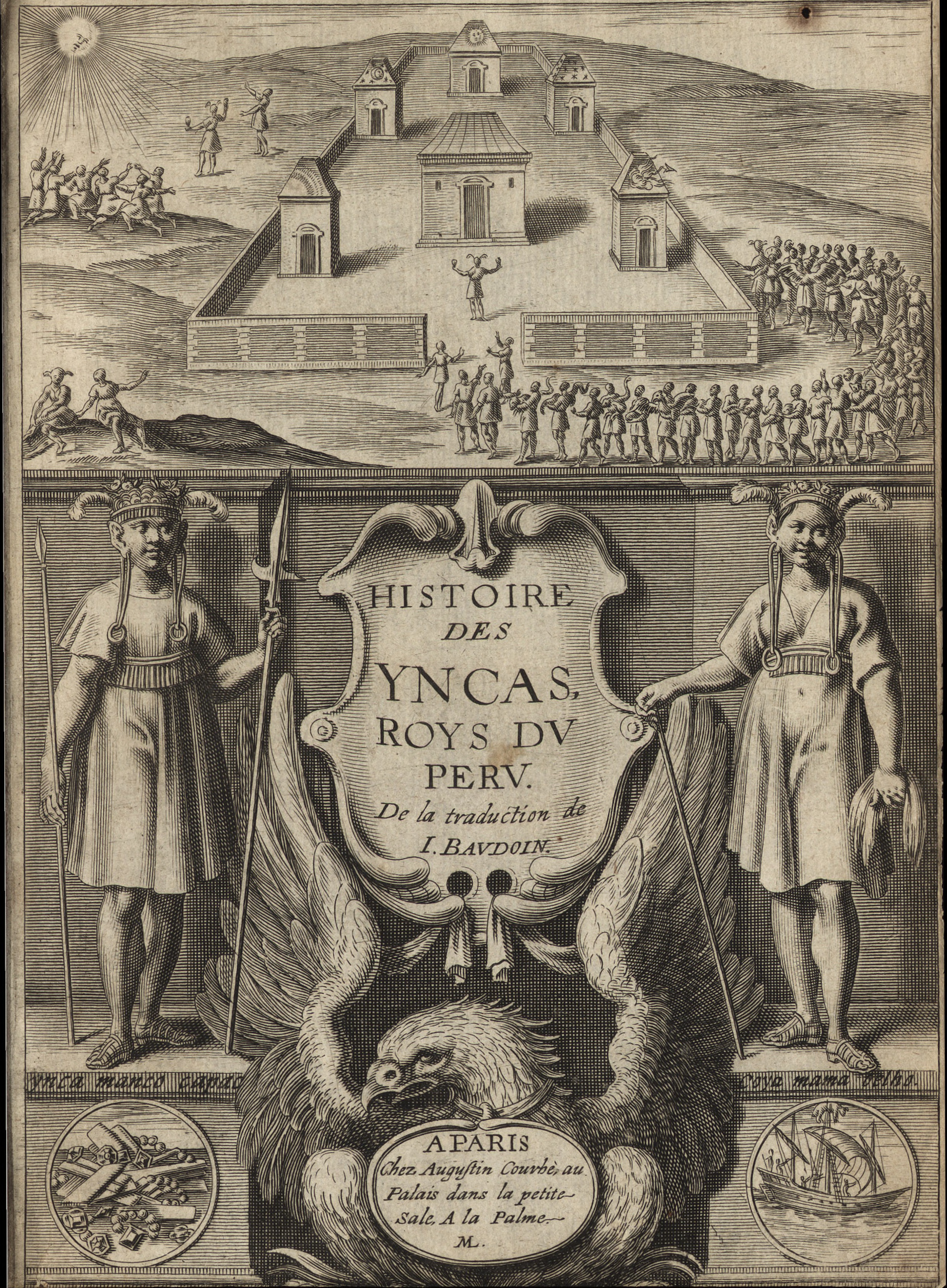
Portraits of Manco Capac and Mama Ocllo. Cover of the first edition in French (1633) of the Comentarios Reales de los Incas, under the title: "History of the Incas, kings of Peru".

==== Manco Capac and Mama Ocllo ====
This legend was told by Inca Garcilaso de la Vega, a mestizo chronicler who was a descendant of Tupac Yupanqui on his mother's side.

The Sun, seeing the state in which the men lived, took pity on them and sent his son, named Manco Capac, and a daughter, named Mama Ocllo, to civilize the inhabitants of the earth. With this mandate, the Sun placed his children in Lake Titicaca, and told them to go wherever they wanted, and that wherever they stopped to eat or sleep, they would have to sink a golden rod into the ground, where that rod would sink with just one hit, the Sun wanted them to stop there and make their home. Thus, they left the Titicaca Lake and walked north, all the way, wherever they stopped, they stuck the golden rod into the ground and it never sank. They went through a small inn or house, called Paqariq Tampu, and from there they arrived at the valley of Cuzco, which was pure wilderness. The first stop they made was on the hill called Huanacauri, there Manco Capac tried to sink the gold rod into the ground, which very easily sank at the first blow they gave it, so much so that they no longer saw it. Then he said to his sister and wife: "In this valley our father, the Sun, commands that we stop and make our seat and dwelling to fulfil his will." They both left from Huanacauri, each on their own to summon people, Manco Capac to the north and Mama Ocllo to the south. They told all the men and women they met that their father, the Sun, had sent them from heaven to be their teachers and the benefactors to the inhabitants of all that land, to get them out of the ferocious life they had and show them how to live like men. The people, marveling on the one hand to see those two dressed with the ornaments that the Sun had given them, their ears pierced and as open as their descendants had, (Note: Called "Orejones" by the Spanish conquistadors (literally "big-eared"), Inca noblemen had the tradition of piercing their ears at a young age and use discs called "paku" of diverse materials, such as wood, feathers, and metals, according to an individual's social status. These individuals received the name of Rinriyuq ("the one with ears")) and on the other hand, fond of the promises they were told, they believed everything they said, and adored and revered them as children of the sun and obeyed as kings.

Seeing that many people were following them, they ordered some to take care of feeding everyone by working the land so that hunger wouldn't spread them through the mountains again and also instructed them with the outline of how they had to build their huts and houses. In this way they began to populate the city of Cuzco, divided into two that they called Hanan Cuzco (Upper part) and Hurin Cuzco (Lower part), similarly, they divided the lineages by establishing the Hanan ayllu and Hurin ayllu, and the upper and lower districts, Hanan saya and Hurin saya. Those brought by Manco populated Hanan Cuzco and those brought by the Coya populated Hurin Cuzco.

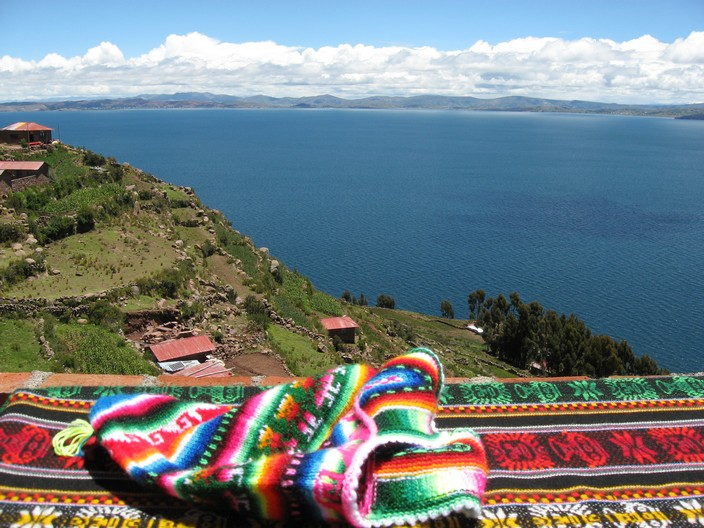
Most stories agree that the first Incas left Lake Titicaca.

=== Historical Explanation ===
It's very likely the Incan ethnic group started as a caravan of Puquina-speaking immigrants forced to move to the north from the decaying Tiwanaku culture, as this was invaded by huge waves of military forces from the south, said invaders would've been the ethnic group known as the aymaras. There is archaeological evidence discovered by Francis de Castelnau in 1845 and confirmed by Max Uhle that Tiwanaku was attacked when it was populated, as unfinished constructions were found. The exact reasons for the crumbling of the Tiwanaku state may have been the speed and strength of the invasions, giving little to no time for the organization of a proper defense, the support given by the conquered chiefdoms towards the invaders, or both.

The caravan stumbled across Pacaritambo, and after a few years of settling down, Manco Capac left with a group made of 10 ayllus. They reached the Wanakawri mountain, and from there they planned to take the Huatanay Valley (Cusco), which belonged to several native ayllus. Although successful in the conquest, the foundation of the city was at risk. Their status as foreign invaders posed the threat of potential wars from their more powerful and larger neighboring chiefdoms, as well as the potential for future uprisings from those who would be conquered seeking to reclaim their land. To mitigate this threat, the Incas built through intermarriage political and kinship alliances with a variety of ethnic groups. Inca rulers married daughters of neighboring ayllu headmen and, in turn, gave their daughters in a reciprocal marriage to that local leader. The practice was ceremonial but also strategic: the Incas utilized the ayllu structure to create networks of mutual obligation with potential rivals while simultaneously anchoring their authority in the valley's social fabric.

== Kingdom of Cusco ==
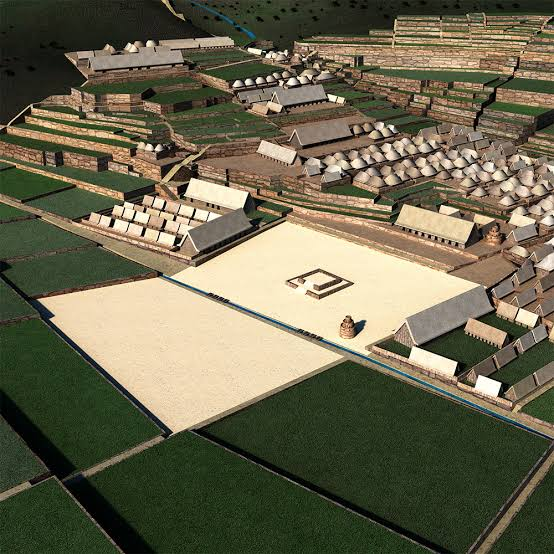
Approximate reconstruction of the main square of Cusco, Huacaypata.

The Kingdom of Cusco lasted from the beginning of the Inca settlement in Cusco under the rule of Manco Capac around the 13th century until the victory of Cusi Yupanqui, later known as Pachacuti, against the Chanka people c. 1438. It is divided between the two dynasties that ruled Cusco: Hurin and Hanan. These lineages corresponded to the two halves of the city: Hurin Cusco (Lower Cusco) and Hanan Cusco (Upper Cusco). The former maintained full control of religious and government functions from Manco Capac until Capac Yupanqui, who suffered a coup by Inca Roca with the support of Hanan Cusco members. From then on, the Hurin dynasty was in charge of the priesthood while the Hanan dynasty took control of civil, political, economic, judicial, and martial activity.

The reigns of Manco Capac and Sinchi Roca are often called "mythical" because of their connection with the stories of the founding of Cusco, and because of the difficulty of proving their existence outside of the chroniclers' accounts based on the oral tradition of the Panakas. The latter also affects the rest of the rulers, although more can be done about it thanks to archaeological studies.

The governments of the Hurin dynasty focused on consolidating the Inca presence in the surroundings of Cusco through political alliances and the conquest of smaller ayllus. By the end of Capac Yupanqui's reign, Cusco had accumulated considerable power, although it was still behind its larger neighbours: the Ayarmacas, Chankas, Lupacas, and Collas. From the reign of Inca Roca, and therefore from the Hanan dynasty, the Kingdom of Cusco and the consequent reforms of its rulers obtained the foundation to become what would be the Inca Empire.

The critical moment for the succession of states came during the Chanka-Inca war, the young prince Cusi Yupanqui organized the defense of the city together with a few noblemen after his father Viracocha Inca and the legitimate successor Inca Urco escaped from Cusco. After fierce resistance they managed to push back the Chankas and eventually conquer them. His feat granted him the position of the new Sapa Inca under the name of Pachacuti, and the reforms introduced during his rule, combined with his expansionist ambitions, led to the formation of the Tawantinsuyu.

== Inca Empire ==
=== Pachacuti ===
Approximate expansion of the Inca Empire during its first years under the command of Pachacuti.

Pachacuti reorganized the Kingdom of Cusco into the Tawantinsuyu, a federalist system which consisted of a central government with the Sapa Inca at its head and four provincial governments: Chinchasuyu (NW), Antisuyu (NE), Kuntisuyu (SW), and Qullasuyu (SE) according to the four main roads that left the capital. Pachacuti is also thought to have built Machu Picchu, either as a family home or retreat.

Pachacuti would send spies to regions he wanted in his empire who would report back on their political organization, military might and wealth. He would then send messages to the leaders of these lands extolling the benefits of joining his empire, offering them presents of luxury goods such as high-quality textiles, and promising that they would be materially richer as subject rulers of the Inca. Most accepted the rule of the Inca as a fait accompli and acquiesced peacefully. The ruler's children would then be brought to Cuzco to be taught about Inca administration systems, then return to rule their native lands. This allowed the Inca to indoctrinate the former ruler's children into the Inca nobility, and, with luck, marry their daughters into families at various corners of the empire.

==== Co-rule of Amaru Topa Inca ====
Pachacuti decided to name his son, Amaru, as his co-sovereign and successor. However he would display no interest in military affairs. Due to this lack of military capability, Pachacuti was forced to change his decision and to replace Amaru. But before that could happen, the co-sovereign abdicated.

==== Co-rule of Tupac Yupanqui ====
Pachacuti's son Tupac Inca began conquests to the north in 1463 and continued them as Sapa Inca after Pachacuti's death in 1471. His most important conquest was the Kingdom of Chimor, the Inca's only serious rival in the coast of the central Andes.

=== Tupac Inca Yupanqui ===
He spent most of his time in war campaigns of conquest or "pacification" and even exploration. The latter took him to Quito to the north and to the Maule River to the south, however, he also had an active participation in the government. Thus, he carried out the first general census, distributed the forms of work (Mit'a and Minka), assigned taxes, established the mitimaes, continued the construction of roads, propagated the cult of the Sun and implanted a calendar based on it.

=== Huayna Capac ===
Tupac Inca's son Huayna Capac added significant territory to the south. At its height, Tahuantinsuyu included Peru, southwest Ecuador, western and south central Bolivia, northwest Argentina, northern Chile and a small part of southwest Colombia.

Tahuantinsuyu was a patchwork of languages, cultures, and peoples. The components of the empire were not all uniformly loyal, nor were the local cultures all fully integrated. The portions of the Chachapoya that had been conquered were almost openly hostile to the Inca, and the Inca nobles rejected an offer of refuge in their kingdom after their troubles with the Spanish. For instance, the Chimu used money in their commerce, while the Inca empire as a whole had an economy based on exchange and taxation of luxury goods and labour (it is said that Inca tax collectors would take the head lice of the lame and old as a symbolic tribute).

Economic productivity was based on collective labor which was organized to benefit the whole community. The ayni was used to help individual members of the community in need, such as a sick member of the community. The Minka or teamwork represented community service and the Mita was the tax paid to the Inca in the form of labor. The Inca did not use currency, economic exchanges were by reciprocity and took place in markets called catus.

== Civil War ==
In 1525 there was an epidemic of a disease unknown to the Incas, usually identified by later historians as smallpox or measles, which caused the death of Huayna Capac in Quito. Before he died, Huayna Capac had designated Ninan Cuyuchi as successor, but he had also fallen ill and died in Tomebamba without his father's knowledge. Although a group of curacas tried to keep the death of the Sapa Inca and his successor a secret to avoid rebellions, Huascar found out from his mother Raura Ocllo, who traveled quickly from Quito to Cuzco. The plague had also killed two of the ruling Inca noblemen in the capital, leaving Huascar as the best option to succeed his father, a choice that was ratified by the Cuzco nobles. Atahualpa, meanwhile, was on campaign with the army and went unnoticed. He was the favorite of the military commanders; the most influential and capable commanders had decided to stay with him in Quito and Tomebamba.

Huascar saw in Atahualpa the greatest threat to his power, since he had spent a decade fighting in his father's campaigns and had the support of many. He did not oppose his remaining as governor of Quito, out of respect for the wishes of his late father, but with two conditions: that he did not carry out military campaigns to expand his territories and that he recognized himself as his vassal and paid him tributes. Atahualpa agreed.

As relations with his half-brother progressively worsened, he traveled to Tomebamba, where he ordered the construction of several buildings supposedly in honor of Huascar, but the only thing he achieved was to increase the intrigues and mistrust of the Cuzco government. Huascar supporters saw in each action of Atahualpa a sign of treason and the Atahualpa supporters considered that they wanted the benefits and wealth of the empire for themselves, excluding them. It was then that Ullco Colla, curaca of Tomebamba, sent messengers to Huascar with news that Atahualpa planned to rebel.

Atahualpa, from Quito, sent presents to his brother as a sign of respect and recognition, but Huascar murdered the messengers and sent others with derogatory gifts (consisting of women's clothing and ornaments) and a message ordering Atahualpa to go to Cuzco. Atahualpa was convinced in Quito by his generals that if he went to Cuzco he would be assassinated and that it was better to defeat Huascar so that he would supplant him in power.

== Spanish conquest ==
Spanish conquistadors led by Francisco Pizarro explored south from Panama, reaching Inca territory by 1526. It was clear that they had reached a wealthy land with prospects of great treasure, and after one more expedition (1529), Pizarro traveled to Spain and received royal approval to conquer the region and be its viceroy.

=== Spanish arrival ===
At the time the Spanish returned to Peru, in 1532, a war of succession between Huayna Capac's sons Huáscar and Atahualpa and unrest among newly conquered territories—and perhaps more they were said to have hidden a city or gold in a vault. Significantly, an epidemic, possibly smallpox which had spread from Central America, had considerably weakened the empire.

Pizarro did not have a formidable force; with just 170 men, 1 cannon and only 27 horses, he often needed to talk his way out of potential confrontations that could have easily wiped out his party. Their first engagement was the battle of Puná, near present-day Guayaquil, Ecuador; Pizarro then founded the city of Piura in July 1532. Hernando de Soto was sent inland to explore the interior, and returned with an invitation to meet the Inca, Atahualpa, who had defeated his brother in the civil war and was resting at Cajamarca with his army of 80,000 troops.

Pizarro met with the Inca, who had brought only a small retinue, and through interpreters demanded that he convert to Christianity. A widely disputed legend claims that Atahualpa was handed a Bible and threw it on the floor, the Spanish supposedly interpreted this action as adequate reason for war. Though some chroniclers suggest that Atahualpa simply didn't understand the notion of a book, others portray Atahualpa as being genuinely curious and inquisitive in the situation. Regardless, the Spanish attacked the Inca's retinue (see Battle of Cajamarca), capturing Atahualpa.

Thereby, the victory of the comparatively small Spanish force can be attributed to the presence of Spanish horses, which were unknown to the Inca before the arrival of Pizarro, as well as to the usage of guns and cannons by the Spanish men. Furthermore, the local educational investments, which had an impact on economic growth and development, did not equal those of the Spaniards, with the numeracy level of Peruvian Inca Indios amounting to half the numeracy level of Spanish invaders.

Pizarro used the capture of Atahualpa to gain gold as a ransom. Atahualpa offered the Spaniards enough gold to fill the room he was imprisoned in, and twice that amount of silver. The Incas fulfilled this ransom. Over four months, almost 8 tons of gold was collected. Pizarro was supposed to let the ruler of the Incas free once the ransom was paid, but he refused to release the Inca after that and instead had him strangled in public. During Atahualpa's imprisonment Huáscar was assassinated. The Spanish maintained that this was at Atahualpa's orders; this was one of the charges used against Atahualpa when the Spanish finally decided to put him to death, in August 1533.

=== End of the Civil War ===
Chalcuchimac, Rumiñahui and Quizquiz were the three main Atahualpa's generals during the war.

Chalcuchimac, who was also imprisoned in Cajamarca after carrying Atahualpa's ransom, was accused of poisoning Tupac Hualpa on the way to Cusco, for which he was sentenced to death. Refusing to be baptized, Chalcuchimac was burned alive in 1533 in Jaquijahuana, near Cuzco.

Quizquiz, who sent Chalcuchimac, decided to attack the Spanish garrison at Jauja (one of the three places occupied by the Spanish, the others being Cusco and the colony of San Miguel, which ensured reinforcements by sea), where after some victories against Hernando de Soto was defeated thanks to the support of Francisco Pizarro and Manco Inca. He attacked Jauja again after a while but was defeated by Captain Gabriel de Rojas y Córdova in command of 40 Spaniards and 3,000 Indian auxiliares (mostly Huancas, who were defending their home and had sworn allegiance to Francisco Pizarro during the capture of Atahualpa), which forced him to retreat to Huánuco Pampa and from there to the north, he had to face many hostile populations who were supporters of Cusco or saw the Spanish as liberators.

Rumiñahui seems to have maintained the need to confront the Spanish conquistadors as soon as they landed, but his astute advice, as a consummate soldier, had not been followed and Atahualpa had preferred to laugh at the opinion of his spies. Rumiñahui had thus remained outside the city with an army made up of around 5,000 soldiers. When it became clear that the day had been fatal for the armies of Atahualpa, Rumiñahui gave the order to withdraw to Quito and managed to rescue his troops without suffering any loss.

After the death of Atahualpa, Rumiñahui understood that the Spanish would also reach the territories under his jurisdiction and he prepared to act accordingly. However, he met with opposition from Illescas who, with a peaceful soul, didn't want to face foreigners whose strength he believed to be on the brink of invincibility. For Rumiñahui, this weakness of Atahualpa's legitimate successor was an incentive to act. With the excuse of a banquet in commemoration of the deceased Inca, he gathered all the relatives and faithful of Atahualpa and, in the middle of the party, he had them all arrested. Rumiñahui fought at first only against Sebastián de Belalcázar, but he was eventually supported by Diego de Almagro and Pedro de Alvarado. His army was also supported by Quizquiz, who was retrieving from the south, and the forces of Zope-Zopahua, Zopozopangui, Razo-razo, and Pintag II, however, the three armies fought separately, which gave the Spanish the advantage. The factor that most influenced the outcome of the conflict were the allies of the Spanish, the Cañari and other minor ethnic groups, who took care of all warfare, be it combat or transport of supplies. Despite this, the first battles were very fierce and the Spanish began to taste defeat, that was, until the Battle of Mount Chimborazo. Before Quito fell, Rumiñahui burned it down, hid the famous treasures of Atahualpa and killed 4000 pillajes, zámbizas and collaguazos indigenous people that had received Belalcázar as their liberator, who entered the city in 1534.

Rumiñahui refused to accept defeat, so gathering new allies, he fell on Quito and pursued Belalcázar who was going to Riobamba to meet Pedro de Alvarado and delayed Belalcázar's second entry into Quito by three months. Belalcázar gave the final assault on Rumiñahui in the Sigchos pucará, in Cotopaxi. Rumiñahui, limping and alone, was captured and tortured to give information about Atahualpa's supposed hidden treasure, but never said a word about it. Faced with their failed attempts, the Spanish decided to execute Rumiñahui, Zope-Zopahua, Quingalumba, Razo-razo and Sina on June 25, 1535, some were burned alive and others with equally atrocious forms of execution.

Quizquiz, together with the Inca nobleman Huayna Palcon, withdrew into the jungle to plan the strategy to follow in the fight against the Spanish. Perhaps he wanted to develop a guerrilla fight until he redid his forces, which Huayna Palcon opposed. He, apparently, wanted an understanding with the Spanish. In the midst of the heated discussion that broke out, Huayna Palcon took a spear and pierced Quizquiz's chest, killing him c. 1535.

== Neo-Inca State ==
=== Rebellion of Manco Inca ===
An associate of Pizarro's, Diego de Almagro, attempted to claim Cusco for himself. Manco tried to use this intra-Spanish feud to his advantage, recapturing Cusco in 1536, but the Spanish retook the city.

=== Retreat to Vilcabamba ===
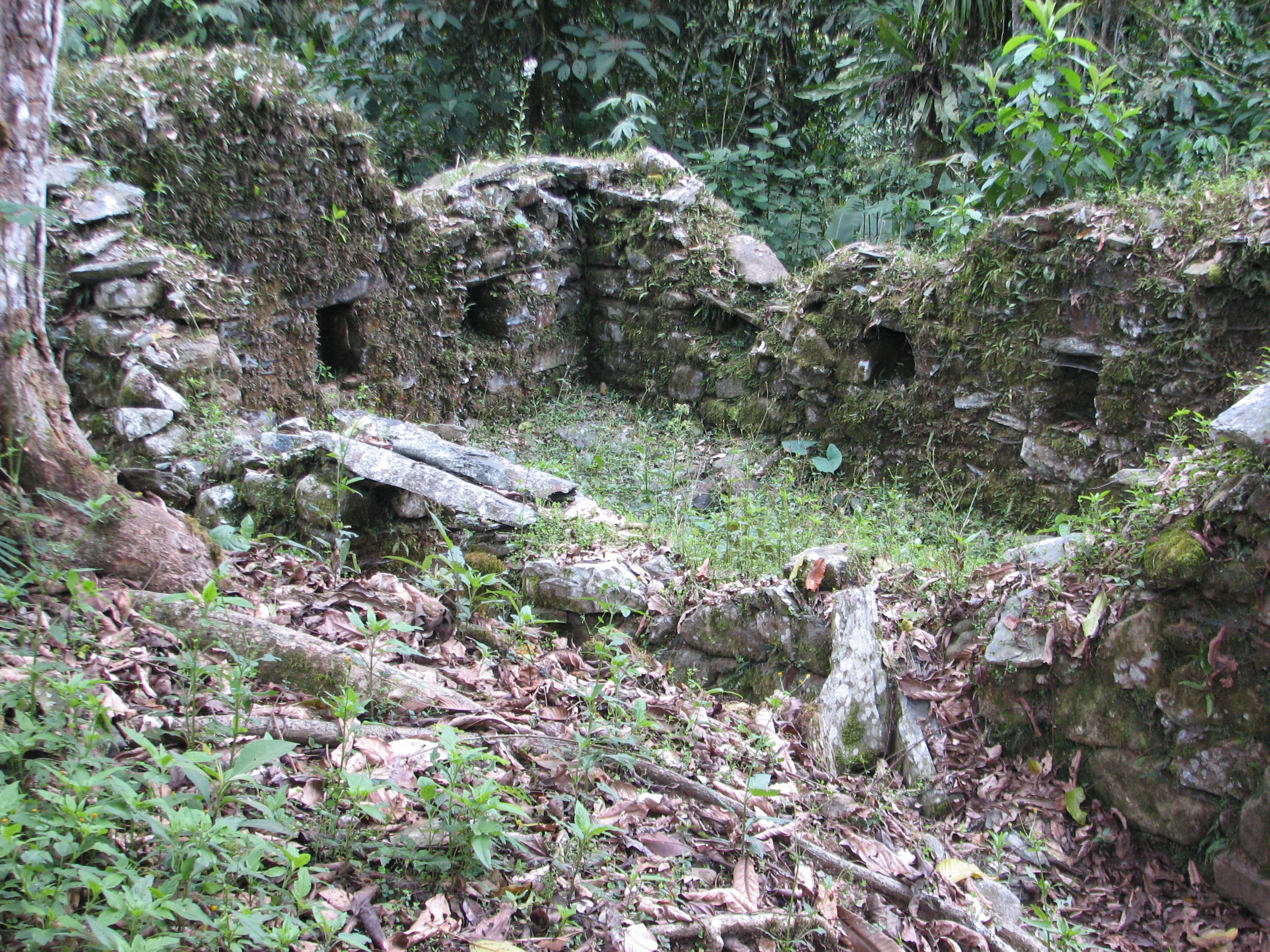
Ruins of Espíritu Pampa (Vilcabamba)

Manco Inca then retreated to the mountains of Vilcabamba and founded the Neo-Inca State, where he and his successors ruled for another 36 years, sometimes raiding the Spanish or inciting revolts against them. In 1572 the last Inca stronghold was discovered, and the last ruler, Túpac Amaru, Manco's son, was captured and executed, bringing the Inca empire to an end.

== Post-Spanish conquest ==
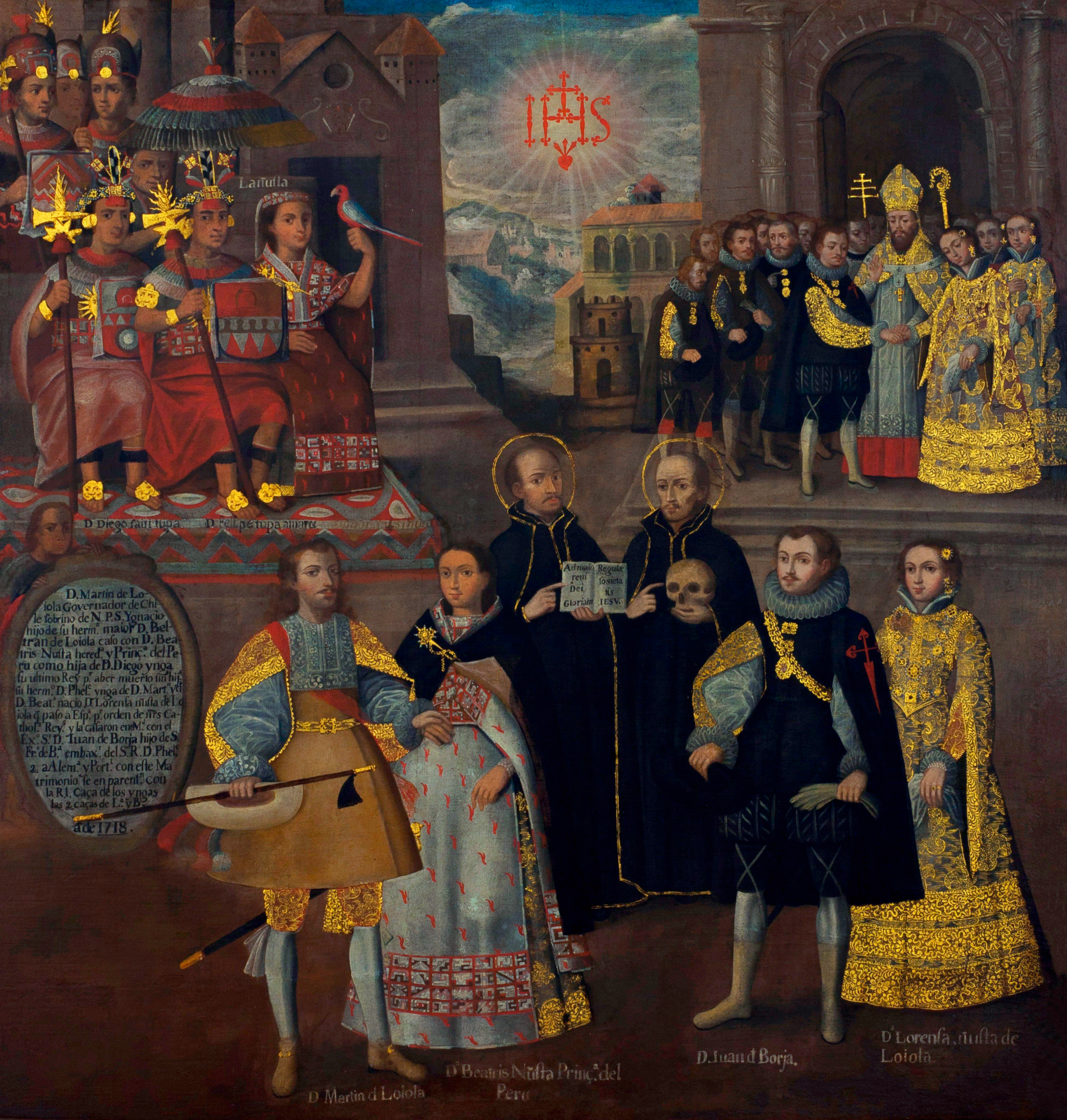
Marriage of Captain Martín García Óñez de Loyola with Beatriz Clara Coya and Juan Enríquez de Borja with Ana María de Loyola Coya, daughter of Martín and Beatriz. At the top left: Sayri Tupac's panaca, the family of Beatriz.

After the fall of Tahuantinsuyu, the new Spanish rulers repressed the people and their traditions. Many aspects of Inca culture were systematically destroyed, including their sophisticated farming system. The Spanish used the Inca mita (mandatory public service) system to get labourers for mines and plantations. One member of each family was forced to work in the gold and silver mines, the foremost of which was the silver mine at Potosí. When one family member died, which would usually happen within a year or two, the family would be required to send a replacement.

The major languages of the empire, Quechua and Aymara, were employed by the Catholic Church to evangelize in the Andean region. In some cases, these languages were taught to peoples who had originally spoken other indigenous languages. Today, Quechua and Aymara remain the most widespread Amerindian languages.

Once the viceroyalty was established, the condition of the Inca nobility was not accepted by the encomenderos, since they believed that this social class could lead uprisings and revolutions, as happened during the Manco Inca rebellion, however, for a century, the nobility was recognized and accepted.

The Crown also sought to consolidate its position, creating special colleges for curacas. In them, in addition to being correctly evangelized, they learned grammar and science. Viceroy José de Armendáriz reestablished the system by which Inca nobles who could prove their ancestry were recognized as Hidalgos of Castile. This led to a frenzy on the part of the indigenous nobility, who had to prove their noble titles to legitimize their status. But this situation worsened in 1780 with the rebellion of Tupac Amaru II, when they lost these privileges.
