= Kingdom of Cusco =

Former kingdom and city state

Kingdom of Cuzco
- c. 1200–c. 1438
- Sapa Inca banner
- Capital: Cusco
- Common languages: Aymara; Puquina among nobility
- Religion: Inca religion
- Government: Monarchy
- Sapa Inca
  - c. 1200–1230: Manco Capac
  - c. 1230–1260: Sinchi Roca
  - c. 1260–1290: Lloque Yupanqui
  - c. 1290–1320: Mayta Capac
  - c. 1320: Tarco Huaman
  - c. 1320–1350: Capac Yupanqui
  - c. 1350–1380: Inca Roca
  - c. 1380–1410: Yawar Waqaq
  - c. 1410–1438: Viracocha Inca
- Historical era: Pre-Columbian
  - Manco Capac organized the Kingdom of Cusco: c. 1200
  - Inca Roca overthrows Capac Yupanqui and becomes the first Hanan Cusco ruler: c. 1350
  - Cusi Yupanqui defeats the Chanka people: c. 1438
Preceded by	Succeeded by
Wari Empire; Killke culture	Inca Empire
- Today part of: Peru

The Kingdom of Cusco (sometimes spelled Cuzco and in Quechua Qosqo or Qusqu), also called the Cusco confederation, was a small polity based in the Andean city of Cusco that began as a small city-state founded by the Incas around the start of 13th century. In time, through warfare or peaceful assimilation, it began to grow into the Inca Empire (1438–1533).

== Government ==
The government in Cusco was not much different than most polities in the region. It is likely that the title held by each ruler was that of a kuraka or sinchi, until the reign of Inca Roca, who introduced the term Sapa Inca, or Inca for short. This term would later come to represent the entire ethnic group, while also signifying the roles of "monarch" or "emperor."

Kurakas were simply the heads of an ayllu, a group of families with the same common ancestor or place of origin (Paqarina), that could differ significantly in size and territory. Meanwhile, the term capac, which meant "powerful", "rich" or "mighty", could be used as in capac kuraka ("powerful lord"), a title held by those in charge of some of the larger polities in the Andes. Similarly, there was also the title of hatun kuraka ("great lord") with the same implication, which was still in use during the Inca Empire to refer to the heads of larger provinces, as was the case with the Huancas who got divided into three.

Sinchi was the Andean equivalent of a warlord and military commander. This position was elected by the most prominent members of an ayllu and had the primary role to defend it in the event of an attack or invade other lands. It was temporal, but given that periods of conflict in the Andes could last for years or even decades, the term sinchi could be seen as equivalent for the kuraka during wartime.

== History ==
=== Foundation ===
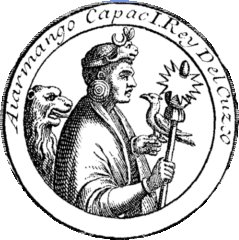
Portrait of Manco Capac (c. 1615), by Antonio de Herrera.

During the exodus from Lake Titicaca, a caravan of Puquina-speaking immigrants from the crumbling Tiwanaku state stumbled upon Pacaritambo, the pacarina of the Maras people, since they originated "without parents" from one of the "windows" called Maras t'uqu. After staying there for many years, the group divided into two: the first were called Tampus, who would leave from another window called Sut'i t'uqu and eventually populate Ollantaytambo; and the second, who came out of the last window called Qhapaq t'uqu, which was the group under command of Manco Capac, consisting of 10 ayllus. Despite their nomadic character, on their journey, they always stopped for a few years to farm in the surrounding areas of nearby villages or independent ayllus. From Pacaritambo, they first stopped at Huanancancha, where Manco Capac took Mama Ocllo in servinacuy (concubinage); the next stop was on Tampuquiro, where possibly Sinchi Roca was born, and then they stopped at Pallata, here Sinchi Roca's first haircut was celebrated. They continued their advance and reached Quirirmanta, where Manco Capac finally married Mama Ocllo according to the usual rites, apart from whom he had other wives, among them the fierce Mama Huaco. The Incas captured the Huanacauri, which was under control of the Alcahuisa people, and did the same to the Matagua, where it was celebrated the warachikuy of Sinchi Roca, declaring him an adult. Finally, they planned to capture the Huatanay river, which constitutes the main river of the entire valley of Cusco, and had the presence of many nearby ethnic groups: Huallas, Saños, Antasayas, Lares, Poques, Sahuaseras, and the already mentioned Alcahuisas.

Faced with the imminence of a conflict, Manco Capac sought an alliance between the opposing nations. He noticed the sinchi of the Saños, called Sitichuaman. Both examined the situation and decided on the marriage between Sinchi Roca and Mama Coca, daughter of the sinchi. Both groups began to operate in agreement afterwards. Given the situation, the Huallas went to war with their sinchi Apu Cagua in command. However, they suffered a crushing defeat due to the outstanding participation of Mama Huaco at the lead of the Inca forces. Many were impaled by her order. Defeated, they fled the area towards the modern-day Sacred Valley of the Incas.

The common danger also strongly united Alcahuisas and Sahuaseras, who put up strong resistance but were ultimately defeated anyway. The Alcachuisa warlord, Copalimayta, preferred exile to domination, while the Sahuaseras were expelled to the south. Something similar happened to the three remaining groups: the Poques were expelled to the east, towards the Paucartambo River; the Lares were expelled to the northwest, to the valley that currently bears their name; while the Antasayas were expelled to the outskirts of Cusco during the government of Lloque Yupanqui (under the name of the Quisco ayllu, patronymic of their then lord). The recently founded city of Cusco was divided into four districts: Quinticancha, Chumbicancha, Sairecancha, and Yarambuycancha.

=== Hurin Cusco ===
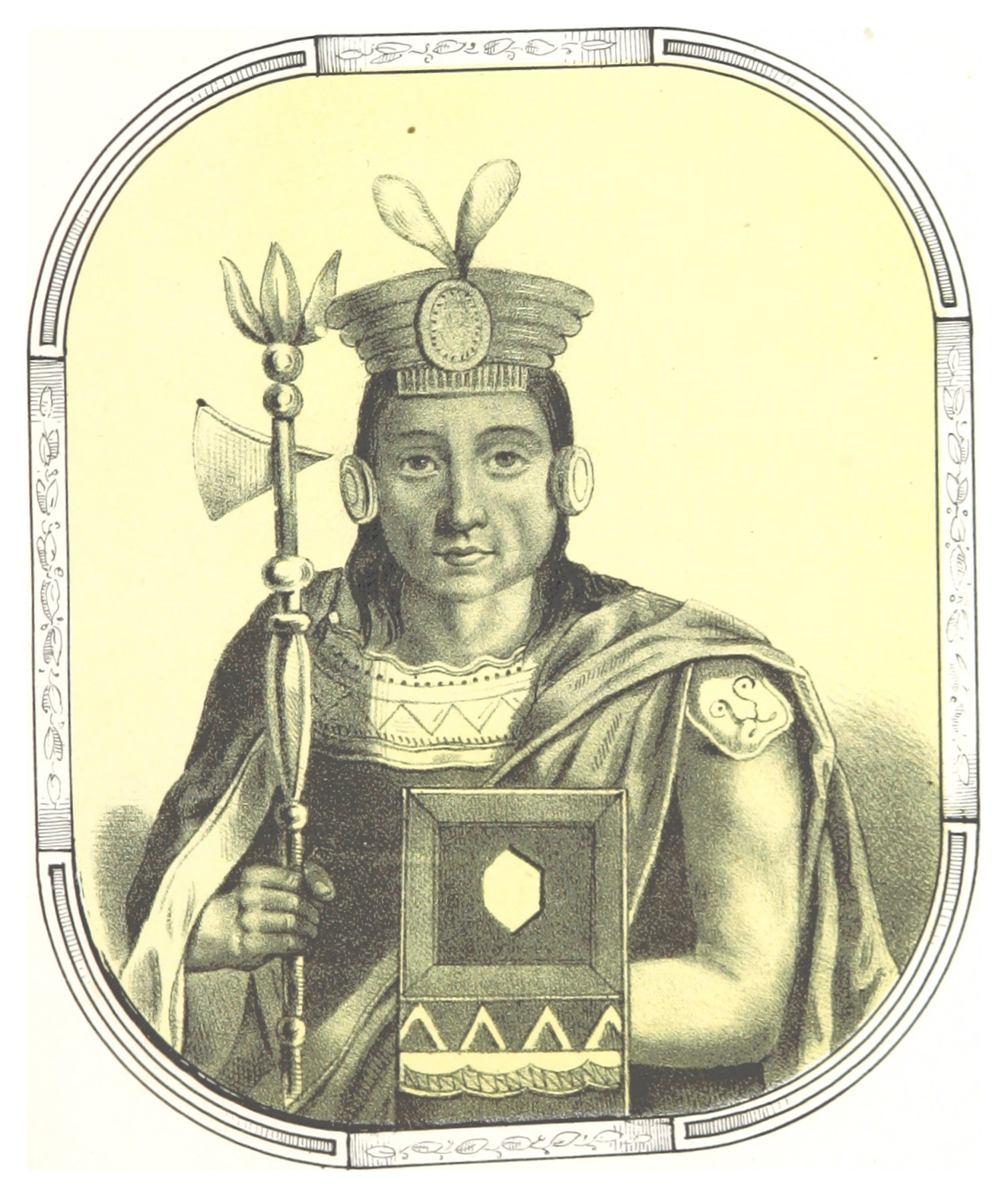
Portrait of Sinchi Roca, the first one to wear the maskaypacha.

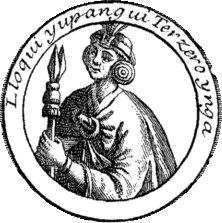
Portrait of Lloque Yupanqui, note the detail of the left hand.

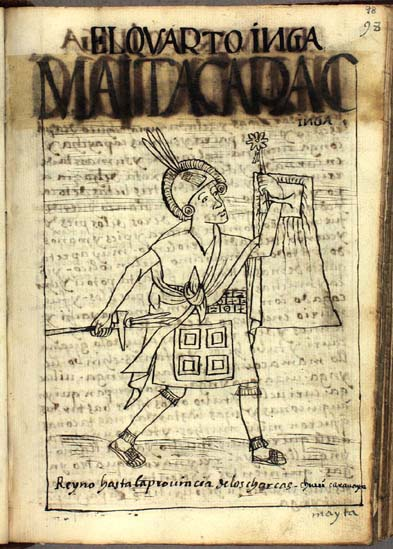
Drawing of Mayta Capac, made by Guaman Poma.

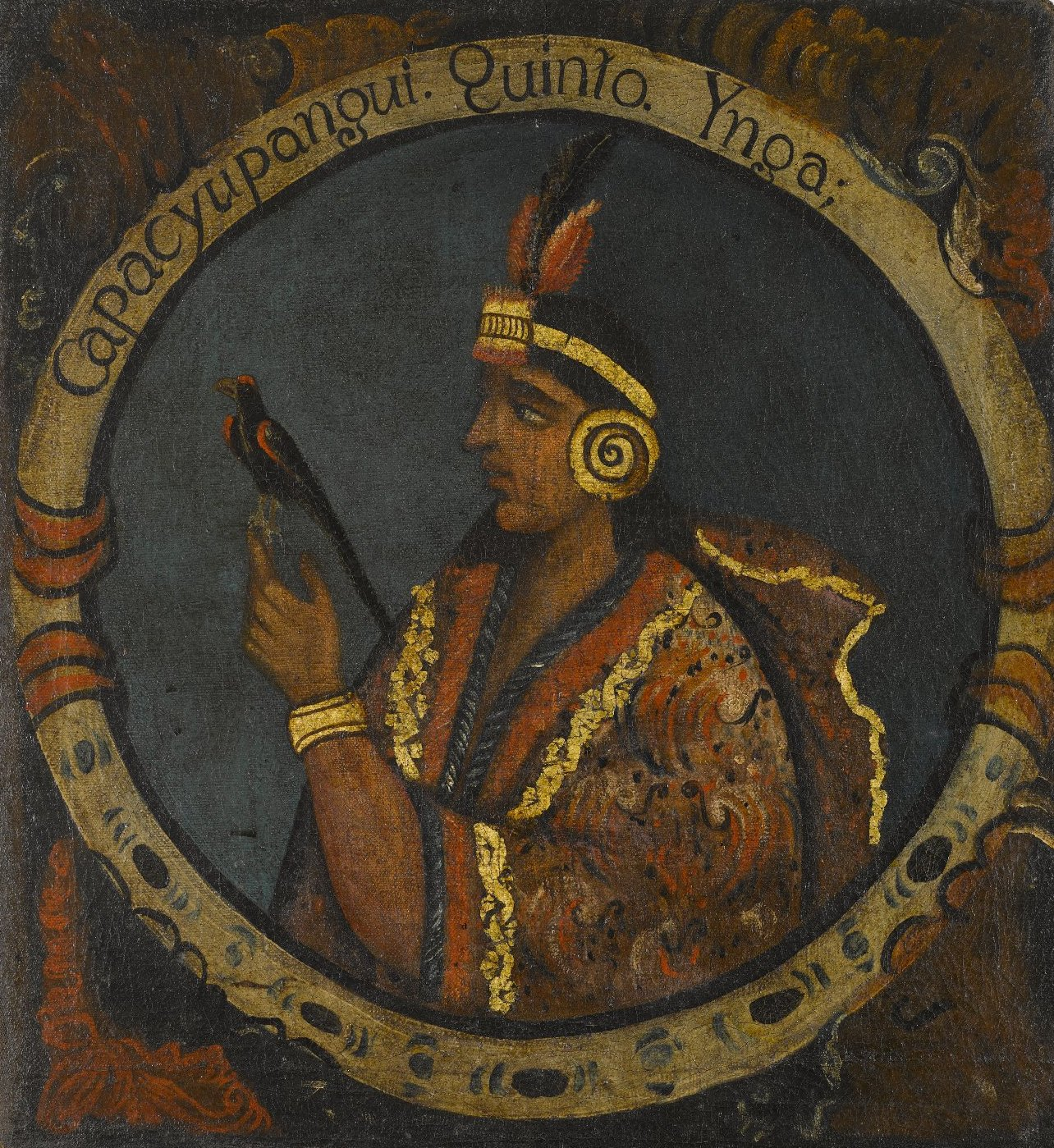
Portrait of Capac Yupanqui, Brooklyn Museum.

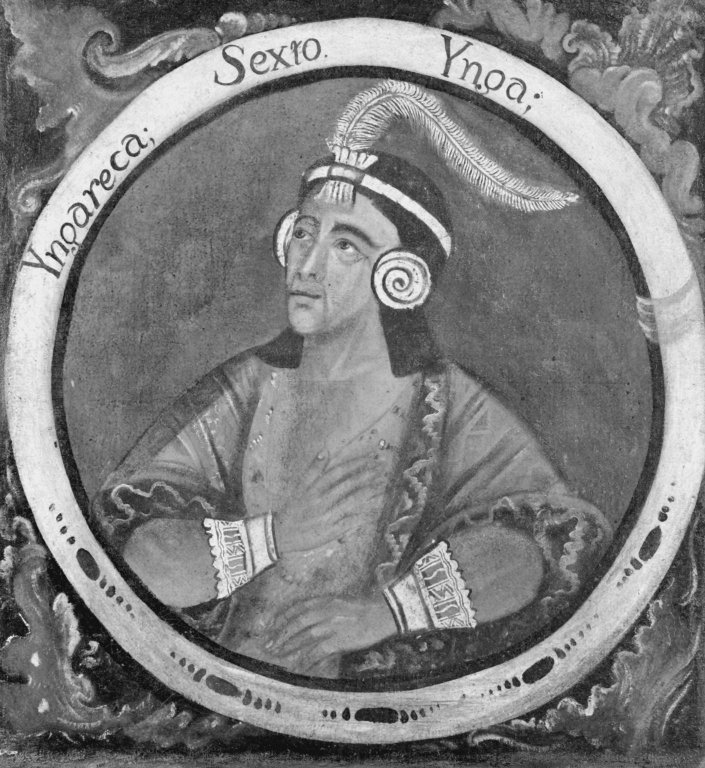
Portrait of Inca Roca. The first Inca ruler from Hanan Cusco.

When Manco Capac died, his body was mummified by his family (Chima panaca). Sinchi Roca (c. 1230 – c. 1260) took charge of Cusco. Although his name, "generous warlord", indicates remarkable participation in the conquest of the valley, during his government, he was unable to significantly expand Cusco's territory. Among his works are the construction of terraces and the importation of enormous quantities of soil to improve the fertility of the valley, as well as a war clash against the large Ayarmaca kingdom. His descendants and family members were grouped within the Raura panaca.

His successor, Lloque Yupanqui (c. 1260 – c. 1290), continued the war against the Ayarmaca, taking advantage of the opportunity offered by the death of their leader, Tocay Capac, in combat. This heavily diminished the Ayarmacas' capability to pose a threat to the Incas for a long time, which allowed him to conquer the territory of the Maras people. Lloque Yupanqui knew how to maintain good relations with Cusco's neighbouring kingdoms, chiefdoms and ayllus in order to secure his territory and avoid unnecessary conflict. He befriended some of the Ayarmaca ayllus, Tampucunca and Quilliscachis, which caused conflicts inside the macro-ethnic group. He married Mama Cahua, princess of the Uma ayllu, (for political reasons) and so his family was grouped within the Auyni panaca.

A young Mayta Capac (c. 1290 – c. 1320) was put in charge after his father died of old age. It was necessary for the maskaypacha to be kept inside the temple of the sun and for his uncle to replace him in power for some years, which may have been the reason behind his name "Where is the powerful one?". Another possibility is that Mayta was a Puquina term, the meaning of which has been lost. (Note: The Incas also spoke Puquina. Garcilaso de la Vega wrote that Mayta was a proper name and had no meaning. Similarly, other sources don't bother to write the meaning of his name. In Quechua, mayta or maytaq? means: "where?, which one?, where is it?")

The fourth among his brothers, it is said that in his early years, still a child, he exhibited strength, physical endurance, courage, and bravery. During his reign, the Alcahuisa people prepared to revolt with the help of the cullumchima ayllu after many years of an allegedly fake allegiance. The pretext for the conflict was an incident between a man and a woman of opposing sides over a well, where Mayta Capac broke the leg of the Alcahuisa sinchi's son. In retaliation, the Inticancha was attacked during the night, but he was able to fight back and kill two men, injuring many more. After the uprising commenced, the Incas achieved two successive victories, leading to a temporary ceasefire that was promptly violated by the insurgents. Subsequently, in the third encounter, the Alcahuisa sinchi was captured and subsequently sentenced to life imprisonment, with his people's territories being divided among the inhabitants of Cusco. Satisfied with the victory and having achieved the consolidation of his power around Cusco, Mayta Capac prepared his army for an expedition towards the Cunti people, to the southwest; but he died due to disease before his departure.

Many polities allied with Cusco once the news spread of his victory in suppressing the rebellion, so he celebrated great feasts for his people. He married Mama Tancaray, daughter of the lord of the Collagua people, and his panaca was called Usca Mayta. He also had many children, the eldest, named Cunti Mayta, was put as Willaq Umu, and he chose another named Tarco Huaman as his successor.

Tarco Huaman successfully replaced his father but got deposed almost immediately by his cousin, Capac Yupanqui. The latter then killed nine of his brothers and rounded up the rest to make them swear allegiance as to ensure his reign. Tarco Huaman was placed in charge of his father's panaca, and would eventually be sent as a governor by the new Sapa Inca to ensure the payment of "1000 bird cages from the Andes and the puna grasslands" as tribute in the newly annexed Cuyos ayllu.

Capac Yupanqui (c. 1320 – c. 1350) inherited a Cusco under the direct interest of his larger neighbours as it was no longer a small invader kingdom struggling for survival but one fighting to gain power. He continued the project of his uncle by invading the Cunti peoples, which he defeated in two battles, killing more than 6000 men. Due to his victory, the Quechua polity (not to be confused with Quechua people) sent him an embassy with many gifts as a symbol of their alliance. They asked for his protection against the expanding Chanka peoples who threatened them with invasion in Andahuaylas. Because Yupanqui considered them "great warriors", he accepted the offer by sending pieces of gold and silver. Later, he went to conquer the Masca, and the western ayllus of Anta and Cuyo. In the latter, he asked for bird cages as tribute. These were used in rites before going out on military campaigns.

The Ayarmaca kingdom, already recovered from the conflicts provoked by Lloque Yupanqui and having heard the news of the conquests of Cusco, saw in the Chanka warriors a greater threat than that of its southern neighbors, for which reason they sought an alliance with Capac Yupanqui by sending him the princess Curi Hilpay to marry, from this union he had a son called Quispe Yupanqui. Cusi Chimbo was another wife of his, sister of the first Coya before Curi Hilpay, called Mama Chimbo, she is described as "Cruel and with bad behavior, friend of banquets and drunkenness". Whether it was jealousy or a part of Inca Roca's conspiracy, she would end up poisoning his husband through a golden cup. This led to a political crisis in Cusco, and the ensuing chaos was taken advantage of by the Chanka, who conquered the now-isolated Quechua polity. Capac Yupanqui assigned Quispe Yupanqui as his successor before dying, unfortunately, he was assassinated during the quick coup d'état of the government made by Inca Roca with the support of the Hanan Cusco dynasty.

=== Hanan Cusco ===
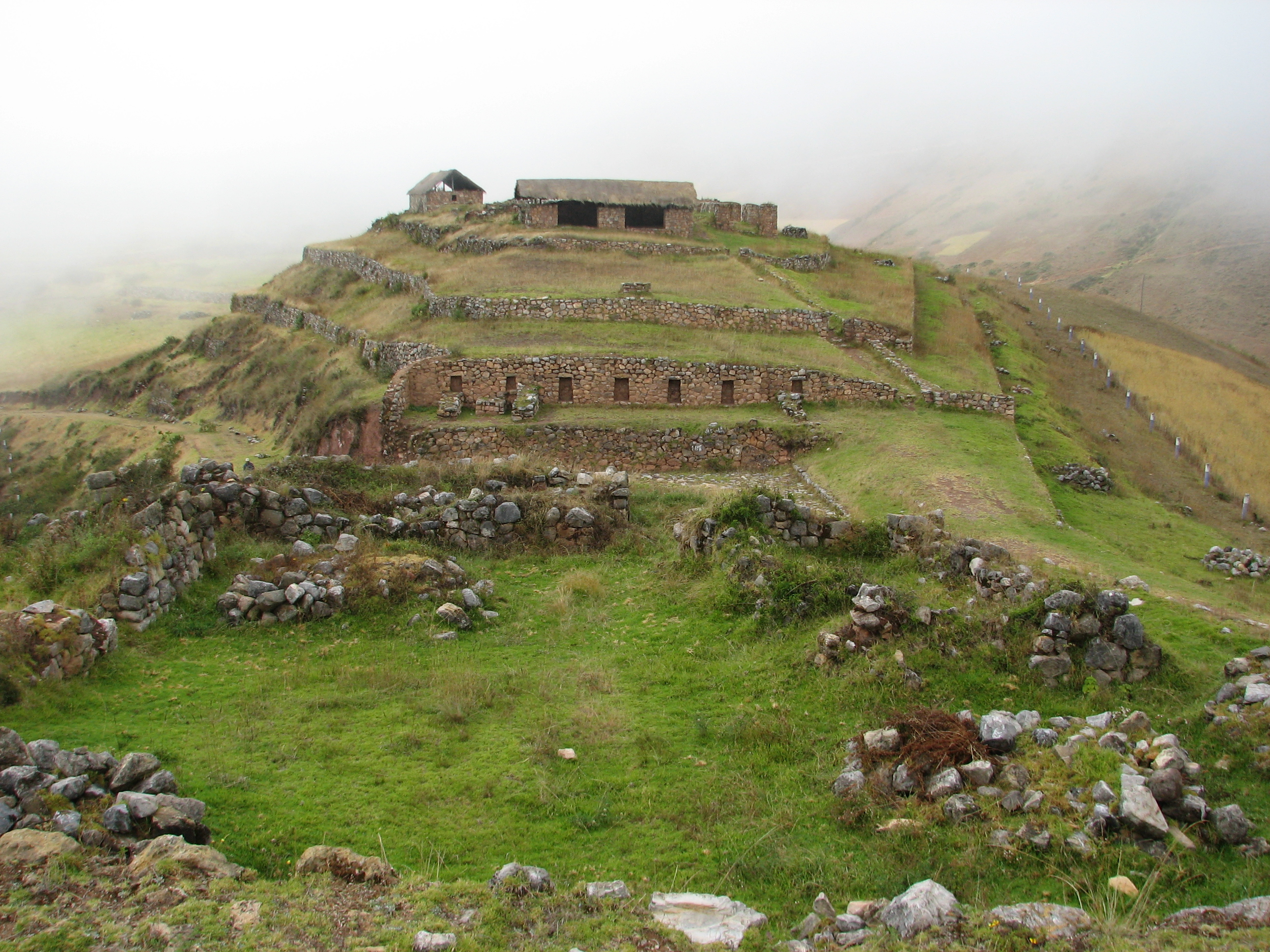
Chanka "Fortress of Sondor" about 30 km. from Andahuaylas.

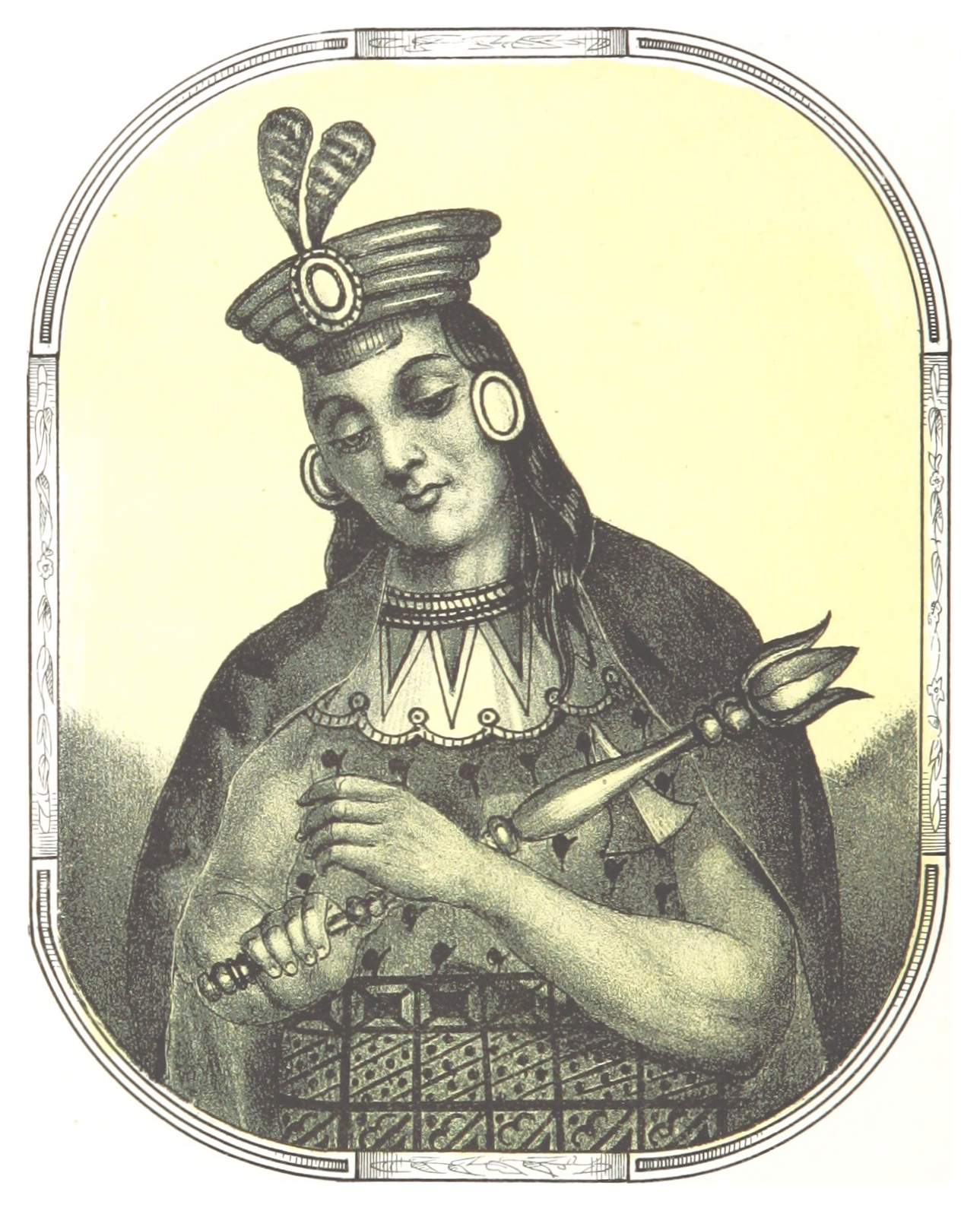
Portrait of Yawar Waqaq.

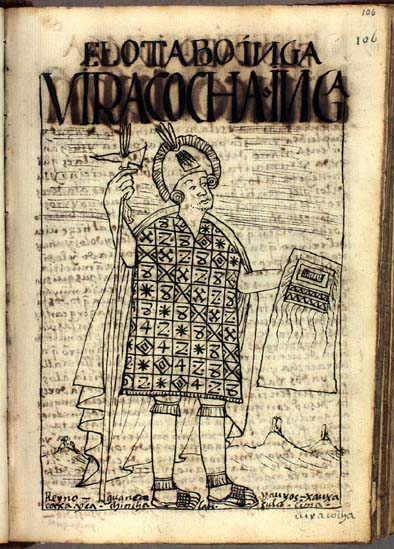
Drawing of Viracocha Inca made by Guaman Poma.

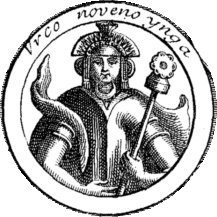
Portrait of Inca Urco.

Inca Roca (c. 1350 – c. 1380) was the first ruler who used the term "Inka" to refer to himself, which meant monarch or emperor, but as is known, it is also used to refer to the ethnic group, and during the empire, to the royalty and some members of the nobility. Before this, it was most likely that Cusco's rulers simply had the title of sinchis or curacas, like almost every polity at the time.

Due to the political turmoil in the capital, several ayllus rebelled against the new government, among them the Mascas whose kuraka, Cusi Huaman, was a sympathizer of the Hurin dynasty; the uprising had no effect and after a bloody battle he was jailed in Cusco. The sinchis of the Muyna and Pinagua peoples, Muyna Pongo and Huaman Tupac respectively, took advantage of the occasion and tried to gain independence, failing right after the first combat, where the first one died and the second one fled, never to be seen again. (Note: Some sources describe these conflicts as conquests rather than rebellions.)

After these events, Inca Roca led an expedition through Quiquijana and conquered the town of Caytomarca, which he would eventually lose due to leaving no garrison behind. He also conquered the people of Pumatambo, to the southwest, where he travelled and visited for a few days the temples that were there.

The Chankas, positioned on the limits of the Apurimac River after the defeat of the Quechuas, were now in a threatening position to invade both Cusco and the Ayarmaca kingdom. Probably confident in their victories until then, they weren't prepared for the sudden attack by the forces of Inca Roca, who recruited mercenaries from the Canas and Canchis independent polities, making them flee all the way back to Andahuaylas. Many years later, he rearmed his army and led another expedition that headed northeast to the Paucartambo River, conquering the surrounding towns but not passing through the "ceja de selva" (highland jungle), these were the first coca chacras that the Incas had.

One of the first things that Inca Roca did during his government was to replace his home at the Inticancha with a new palace he built in the Hanan half of the city, where the twelve-angled stone was put, thus giving rise to the tradition that each Sapa Inca had to build his official residence instead of occupying the same one as his predecessor (i.e., the temple of the sun). He improved Cusco by building canals for the Saphy and Tullumayo rivers to run through the heart of the city until both merge on the Huatanay, the valley's main river, using stone slabs that are still present today. He also mandated for the young members of the nobility to be instructed in the use of weapons and quipus,and according to Garcilaso, he was the one that founded the first Yachaywasi.

Inca Roca ended up marrying Cusi Chimbo as well, but the chosen Coya was ultimately the daughter of Sumaq Inca, head of the Huallacan ethnic group, called Mama Micay, whom he loved very much and with whom he had his son Titu Cusi Huallpa. Mama Micay turned out to be the former fiancée of Tocay Capac, king of the Ayarmaca, who upon hearing the news declared war on the Huallacan ayllus. After some years of conflict, both parties agreed to peace on the condition that the young Titu Cusi Huallpa had to be handed over to the Ayarmaca nation, for which the Huallacan people invited the boy with the excuse of visiting his mother's land and recognizing him as the future heir.

At the town of Micaocancha, they left him alone because they had to "farm their fields" and deliberately let him be kidnapped by the Ayarmacas in an ambush, who then took him to the town of Amaru. Here, Tocay Capac ordered his men to kill him, but according to the legend, when the boy cried, blood began to come out of his eyes. Moved by the sight, the king spared his life and sent him to graze herds, from where he was transferred for safety to the capital of the Ayarmaca state, Aguayrocancha. Meanwhile, Inca Roca didn't dare to attack and rescue his son for fear that he would be killed in retaliation, the boy would remain within the Ayarmaca kingdom for a year, until Chimor Orma, wife of Tocay Capac and daughter of the lord of Anta, became fond of him and decided to escape together with her relatives. Thus, one day when he went out to play with other children, he met the group at an agreed place and they hurriedly left the city.

When the Ayarmacas were alerted, they pursued them until to the Huaypo Lake, around 31 km from the city of Cusco, where after a skirmish they were forced to withdraw; from there he was returned to Cusco, and as a reward for the great favor done, the Antas were treated as brothers of the capital from then on. In order to put an end to hostilities, Cusco and the Ayarmaca kingdom would eventually make an exchange of women: Mama Chiquia, daughter of Tocay Capac, was given to Titu Cusi Huallpa, while the ñusta Curi Ocllo, daughter of Inca Roca, was given to Tocay Capac, with whom he increased his harem. The Sapa Inca left many offspring at the end of his long reign, which were gathered in the Vicaquirao panaca, named after another of his sons, whom he put in charge of it. His reign was one of the best in Cusco's history and served as the foundation of what would become the Inca Empire.

Titu Cusi Huallpa took the name of Yahuar Huaca (c. 1380 – c. 1400) "The one who cries blood" when he succeeded his father, in commemoration of the event in his childhood. At the beginning of his reign, he had to put down another attempted rebellion by the sinchis of the Muyna and Pinagua ayllus with the help of Vicaquirao, which earned him the title of Apukispay as his brother's "right arm", the constant rebellions that occurred were likely due to the lack of soldiers in the conquered territories, so after discussing the matter both agreed on leaving garrisons on each annexed land. After this, he conquered around 10 neighbouring ayllus from Cusco and had a son with a concubine whom he named Viccho Tupac, after an ayllu with the same name.

During this period of time there were no incidents with the Ayarmacas thanks to his marriage with Mama Chiquia, who ended up becoming the Coya, and whom with he had his sons Paucar Ayllu and Pahuac Huallpa Mayta, the latter became his successor despite being the youngest between both. This disgusted the Huallacan kingdom, who wanted Marcayuto – the son of Yahuar Huaca with a Huallacan woman – to become the Auqui (crown prince), probably with the intention of having influence over the government. They planned to ambush the young prince in the town of Paulo, and so sent an invitation, to which his father agreed, but had his son be accompanied by 40 Rinriyuq (Inca noblemen) as bodyguards with the order to kill anyone who posed a threat to him.

Despite the precautions, both were killed in the ambush, and so Yahuar Huaca ordered the razing of the town of Paulo, capital of the Huallacan people, banishing some and massacring many others. After this tragic incident, the Sapa Inca prepared his army for an expedition towards the Collasuyo, for which most of his confederate polities and ayllus lent themselves, attracted by the promise of making the war with "blood and fire", his project was interrupted by an uprising of the Cunti peoples, who were pressured by the mandatory mitas in favor of the nobility and fearing that the triumph of Cusco would increase their power. They took advantage of a party in Cusco in which Yahuar Huaca was drunk to hit him on the head, which was a signal for all the present Cuntis to rise up in arms. Realizing that it was an insurrection, he went to take refuge at the Inticancha along with others, but they were all killed at the entrance of the temple. The rebels could have sacked the city, but stopped due to a thunderstorm that fell unexpectedly, believing it a providential omen and probably fearing retaliation from the Cusco army, they all returned to their lands.

The regicide of Yahuar Huaca resulted in chaos in Cusco, which allowed the Chankas to reclaim the Apurimac River. What little remained of his family was grouped under the name of Aucaylli panaca since many of the ex-Sapa Inca's sons were also killed in the attack. Without a clear candidate for the succession of the government, the rest of the Panakas met to decide what to do, some proposed to set aside the position of the Sapa Inca and let prominent members of the state take over the government, while others argued that without a leader all the territory gained would be lost. As the conversation heated up, a woman proposed Hatun Tupac, nephew of the former monarch, arguing that he deserved it

Sources differ on whether or not he was the son of Yahuar Huaca, although what is clear is that he belonged to Hanan Cusco and that he was presented to the rest of the world as his legitimate son and successor, probably with the intention to completely erase the traces of the uprising in order to preserve the continuity of power and avoid setting the example for future generations. Once chosen, Hatun Tupac took the name of Viracocha Inca (c. 1400 – c. 1438), supposedly after a dream he had where the god Viracocha appeared, and likely also to strengthen his legitimacy. His coronation was attended by curacas of all the annexed lands, as was the tradition, and also by some of the neighboring nations. The one who stood out was the lord of the Colla Kingdom, Chuchi Capac, who brought a large number of servants and litters with great wealth.

The newly appointed Sapa Inca chose Mama Runtu as his wife, daughter of the lord of Anta, whom with he had his sons Cusi Yupanqui and Capac Yupanqui. The Coya had a shy personality, and so despite her position, she was unable to influence his husband's government to the same degree as some of his concubines, specially Curi Chulpi, from the Sahuasera ayllu, and mother of Inca Urco, the monarch's favorite son, and Inca Socso, who was left in charge of his father's lineage: Socso panaca.

Viracocha Inca invaded the valleys of Yucay and Calca, which he swiftly conquered. After this, he had to put down a minor rebellion led by the Pacaycacha in the Pisac valley. This uprising in Cusco's vicinity served as an opportunity for the Muyna and Pinagua to revolt once again, this time with support from the people of Rondocancha and Casacancha, who in turn were followed by attacks from Ayarmacas and Guaypomarcas. However, they were all defeated thanks to the military command of Vicaquirao and Apo Mayta, the latter being the grandson of Capac Yupanqui.

The people of Caytomarca also revolted against Viracocha by mistreating one of his messengers and telling him that the Sapa Inca was crazy if he thought they would submit to his power since they didn't fear him, so they fortified themselves on the eastern bank of the Urubamba River to await the Inca forces that moved quickly from Calca. When the battle began, both sides hurled stones at each other across the river using slings, accompanied by loud shouts as in most conflicts, and continued for two days straight. Then one night, Viracocha ordered a stone to be heated over a fire, wrapped in a certain mixture or piece of cloth and put into a sling with golden threads. Viracocha launched the fiery projectile with such force that it set a house's thatched roof ablaze instantly. As the people left their houses, an old woman claimed to have witnessed the stone fall from the sky, believing it to be a sign of divine retribution for their rebellious actions. Fearing defeat, they crossed the river on rafts bearing offerings to reconcile with the Incas. Viracocha pretended to be uninterested but then informed them that, had they not surrendered that day, he would have beaten them with large rafts that he had already ordered built. They subsequently sealed a peace agreement, and Viracocha provided one of his women to the Caytomarca sinchi as a gift.

While Viracocha's forces were outside the capital, a brother of Yahuar Huaca assassinated the Inca raptin (a substitute for the Sapa Inca's absence in Cusco) with some of Hurin Cusco members' aid. However, he failed to garner enough support from the public or the rest of the nobility before ultimately taking his own life with poison, fearing punishment. Despite this, Viracocha remained uneasy and decided to resolve the threat by permanently appointing the Willaq Umu himself, still choosing individuals from the Hurin dynasty but ensuring their loyalty beforehand. According to Guaman Poma, he also wanted to "burn all the idols and huacas", but Mama Runtu prevented this by telling him that he would die if he broke the laws of his ancestors.

Once the order was restored, his government was focused on the construction of new homes, increasing the number of chacras, enlarging the molle and quinual groves, and the manufacturing of textiles, necessary products that he needed to compensate the services of his warriors and servants, in which he took great care so that the costumes of the nobility had tocapus.

During this time, the Lupaca and the Colla kingdoms, fierce rivals in the Collao region, were growing stronger. But since neither side wanted an all-out conflict due to their shared fear of each other, they sought an alliance with the Incas instead. Viracocha assured both of his support, but secretly promised his help to Curi, curaca of the Lupacas, who had previously defeated the Canas people and taken their lands. On his way south, Viracocha successfully conquered the Canchis kingdom after meeting little resistance. Meanwhile, their Canas neighbours were peacefully annexed, for which he ordered the construction of a temple dedicated to the god Viracocha and arranged for them to provide the Incas with supplies in the town of Ayaviri.

The curaca of the Collas learned of the Incas' secret alliance and decided to confront his Lupaca counterpart before their allies arrived, the resulting battle in Paucarcolla ended with the curaca Curi emerging victorious. Viracocha quickly headed to the scene after receiving news of the outcome. The meeting between the two rulers took place in Chucuito, where they swore eternal peace by sharing a kero of chicha as a symbol of their friendship. The kero was transported to a temple by priests in the middle of dances and music being performed to commemorate the event.

When Viracocha returned to Cusco, he expressed his desire to retire to his palace in Calca and designate Inca Urco as his successor, who was formally titled "Inca raptin" in his absence. The maskaypacha was transported from Calca to the Inticancha, where the chosen heir began a period of fasting, rituals, and preparations for several days. On the appointed day, he emerged with the crown upon his head, performing additional sacrifices in the temple and staging grand celebrations throughout Cusco.

Much to the disappointment of the population and the nobility, his short reign was the most disastrous in the history of Cusco. He spent the majority of his time with alcohol in recreational establishments throughout Cusco. He wasn't ashamed to display his genitals or toss urine-filled cups, and he was also known for vomiting in the middle of the streets. Unconcerned with the feelings of his wife, the Coya, he spent his days with whichever women he desired, whether they were from low social status, young yanaconas, or even mamaconas. To the wives of the noblemen he found attractive, he would say "My children, how are they?" implying that he had been with them and her children were not from her husbands.

At no time did he try to build his own home or build structures of any kind, he was also completely useless as a warrior. The discontent was complete among the Inca society such that many nobles wanted to overthrow him. At the head was Apo Mayta, who despite his intentions, feared Viracocha's anger and revenge, since he functioned as co-ruler of his spoiled son, probably undertaking some administrative functions.
