= Auqui (crown prince) =

Crown prince in the Inca Empire

Auqui (in quechua: awki) was the title held by the crown prince in the Inca Empire or Tahuantinsuyu. In a generic way, all the male children of the Inca were called auquis; however, the specific title was applicable only to one of them, whose choice was based on criteria different from those of the Eastern world because his capacity was taken into account, rather than his status as first-born or legitimate son.

By extension, auqui in the Inca mythology and in the current Andean mythology, is the protective spirit of a community, a mythical character who lives in the mountains and corresponds to the soul of the high peaks. In current Quechua language the term is generally used in its plural form awkikuna.

== Attributions ==
The Auqui was the son of the Sapan Inca and the Qoya (main wife). He was not always the eldest son, but rather the one who showed more capability, both in government functions and in the art of war. According to Pedro Sarmiento de Gamboa, Spanish explorer and historian, this was the case of Viracocha Inca and his first son Inca Urco who showed cowardice by fleeing from the Chanca invasion and was displaced by his brother Pachacuti. Also Amaru Inca Yupanqui, Pachacuti's son did not become a Sapa Inca because of his weak character, leaving the post to his younger brother Topa Inca Yupanqui. Different was the case of Topa Inca because when he died at Chinchero a succession dispute took place between his two sons, Huayna Capac and Capac Huari, which lasted two years. Huayna Capac won the dispute and put to death his stepmother Chequi Ocllo and banished his half-brother to exile.

According to Juan de Betanzos, one of the first Spanish chroniclers, when the first Inca's wife bore only daughters, the choice of the new Inca could also fall on one of the Sapa Inca's sons by one of his secondary wives, Martín de Murúa, friar and chronicler, adds that the Qoya was requested to adopt the elected successor of the Inca. A legitimation ceremony was performed during which the Qoya sat the prince on her lap and combed his hair, thus turning him into her adopted son.

As crown prince, the auqui occupied the first place of the Inca Panaka (royal lineage), which he had to leave when he became Inca to form his own one. In some cases the Auqui participated in the co-reign of Tahuantinsuyu together with his father. As a symbol of receiving his role as co-ruler, he wore a yellow tassel. This served not only to train him in matters of state, but also to consolidate his rights to be recognized as an Inca upon the death of his father, since his virtues and defects were revealed. This system did not imply an obligation with the elected successor because the decision might be revoked at any time according to the capacity the auqui showed. Inca Roca appointed his son Yahuar Huacac as his co-regent. Not only was the prince instructed in the government, but his father could be convinced of the leadership skills of the future Inca.

Also Pachacutec, after forty years of kingdom decided to name Topa Inca Yupanqui as his successor and co-regent –the latter was the son of the qoya Mama Anarhuaquebut, and not the firstborn of the hundred sons that Pachacutec had.

Only after completing the funeral of the deceased Inca, the Auqui could wear the red mascapaicha, insignia of imperial power, thus becoming the new Inca.

The brothers of the Auqui who did not become Incas were called Phiwi Churi (elder sons).

== See also ==
- Panaka
- Ayllu
- Inca Emperors
- Inca Government

== Bibliography ==
- José Antonio del Busto Duthurburu Perú Incaico, pp. 67-69. Colección de obras escogidas de José Antonio del Busto. Lima, Empresa Editora El Comercio S.A., 2011. ISBN 978-612-306-034-3, in Spanish
- Alberto Tauro del Pino Enciclopedia Ilustrada del Perú. Tercera Edición. Tomo 2, p. 246. Lima, PEISA, 2001. ISBN 9972-40-151-0, in Spanish
- Luis E. Valcárcel Historia del Perú Antiguo, Tomo II, p. 556. Lima, Editorial Juan Mejía Baca, in Spanish
