= Pacarina =

Pacarina may refer to:

- Paqarina, a concept in Incan mythology
- Pacarina (cicada), a genus of insects in the family Cicadidae
