= Cápac Yupanqui =

Fifth Sapa Inca of the Kingdom of Cuzco

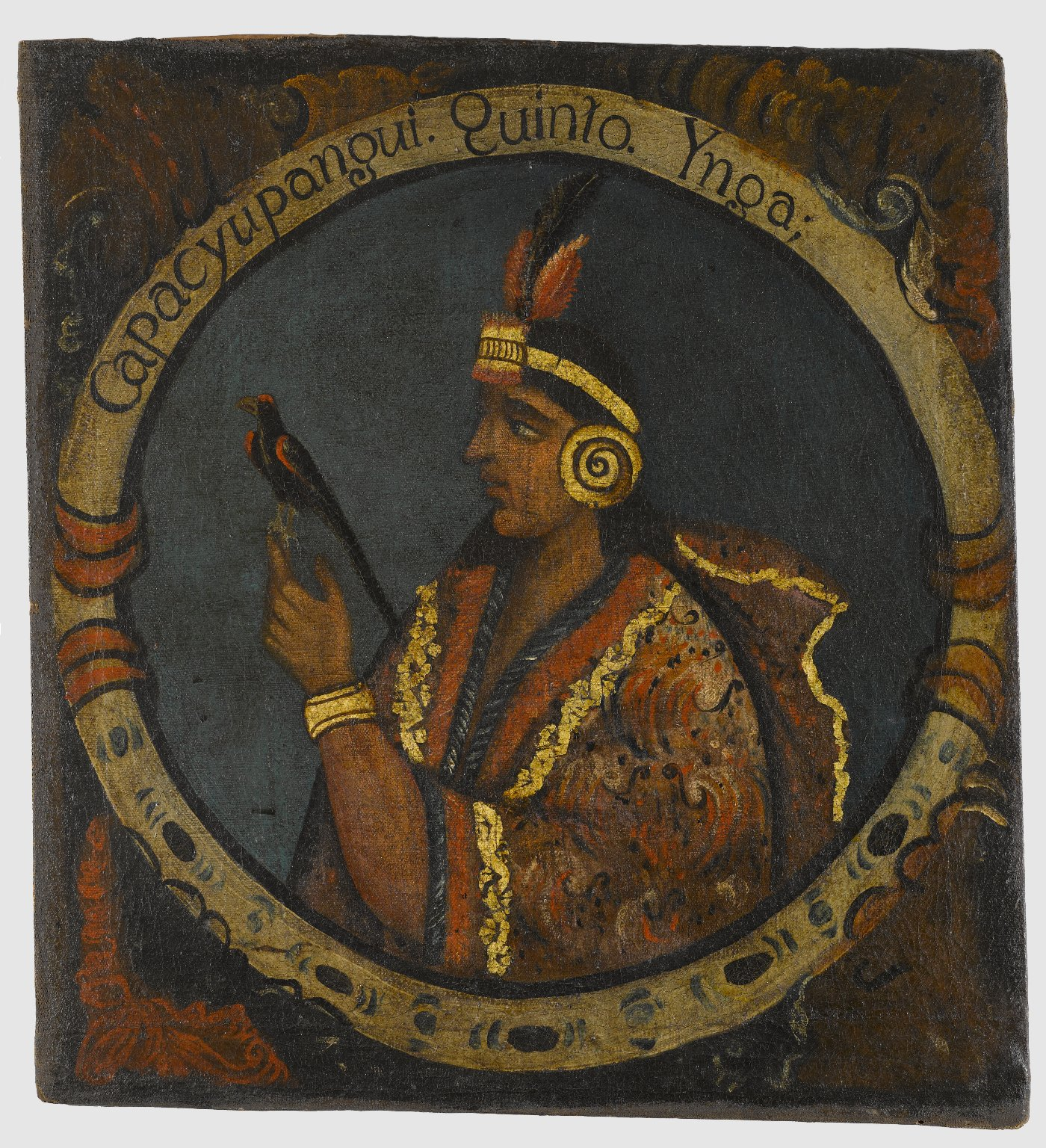
- Painting of Cápac Yupanqui, oil on canvas, Brooklyn Museum

Sapa Inca of the Kingdom of Cusco
- Reign: c. 1320 – c. 1350
- Predecessor: Tarco Huaman
- Successor: Inca Roca
- Born: c. 1320; Cusco, Inca Empire
- Died: c. 1350 (aged c. 30); Cusco, Inca Empire
- Spouse: Qorihillpay; Cusi Chimbo
- Issue: Inca Roca; Quispe Yupanqui
- Dynasty: Hurin
- Father: Mayta Cápac
- Mother: Mama Cuca

Cápac Yupanqui (Quechua: Qhapaq Yupanki Inka, "splendid accountant Inca") (c. 1320 – c. 1350) was the fifth Sapa Inca of the Kingdom of Cusco (beginning around 1320) and the last of the Hurin dynasty.

== Family ==
Yupanqui was a son and successor of Mayta Cápac while his elder brother Cunti Mayta became high priest. His chief wife was Mama Cusi Hilpay (or Qorihillpay or Ccuri-hilpay), the daughter of the lord of Anta, previously a great enemy of the Incas. His son with a woman called Cusi Chimbo, founder of the Hanan dynasty, was Inca Roca.

== Reign ==
In legend, Yupanqui is a great conqueror; the chronicler Juan de Betanzos says that he was the first Inca to conquer territory outside the valley of Cusco – which may be taken to delimit the importance of his predecessors. He subjugated the Cuyumarca and Ancasmarca. His sons from other women included Apu Calla, Humpi, Apu Saca, Apu Chima-chaui, Apu Urco Huaranca, and Uchun-cuna-ascalla-rando. He died in 1350. Garcilaso de la Vega reports that his administration improved the city of Cusco with many buildings, bridges, roads and aqueducts.

Regnal titles
Preceded by Mayta Cápac	Sapa Inca c. 1320 – c. 1350	Succeeded by Inca Roca
