= Mascapaicha =

Inca crown

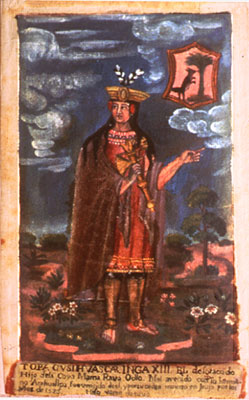
The Maskhaypacha being used by Huascar

The Mascapaicha or Maskaypacha (Quechua: "Maskhay", search and "Pacha", space or time) was the royal crown of the Emperor of the Tawantinsuyu, more commonly known as the Inca Empire.

== Description ==
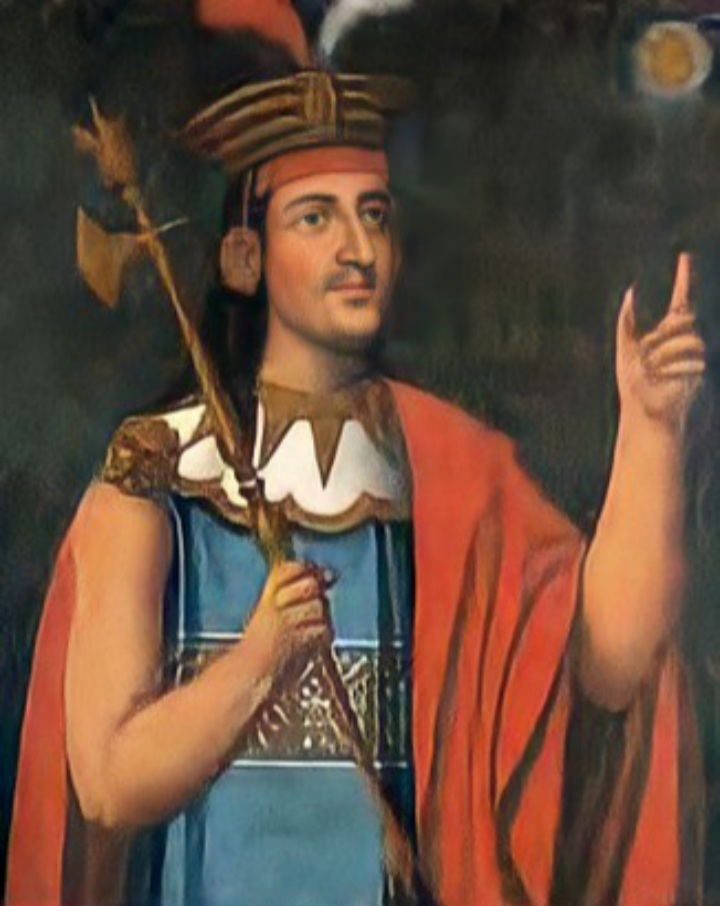
Portrait of Manco Capac wearing the Mascapaicha.

The Mascaipacha was the imperial symbol, worn only by the Sapa Inca as King of Cusco and Emperor of the Tahuantinsuyo. It was a chaplet made of layers of many-coloured braid, from which hung the latu, a fringe of the finest red wool, with red tassels fixed to gold tubes. It was decorated with gold threads and a tuft bearing two or three upright feathers from the mountain caracara, a sacred bird called corequenque in Spanish, it was the physical expression of ultimate political power in the Inca Empire. In some ceremonies the Sapa Inca carried the Mascaipacha in his hand, while he wore a war head-dress (a feather-decorated helmet).

== Ceremonial ==
Only the Sapa Inca could wear the mascapaicha, which was given to him by the Willaq Uma, the high priest of the Empire. The coronation ceremony was carried out when the predecessor Sapa Inca died and it was necessary for the auqui (crown prince) to assume his functions as the new sovereign.

== See also ==
- Inca Empire
- Sapa Inca
- Sinchi Roca
- Inca Civil War
