= Lloque Yupanqui =

Third Sapa Inca of the Kingdom of Cuzco

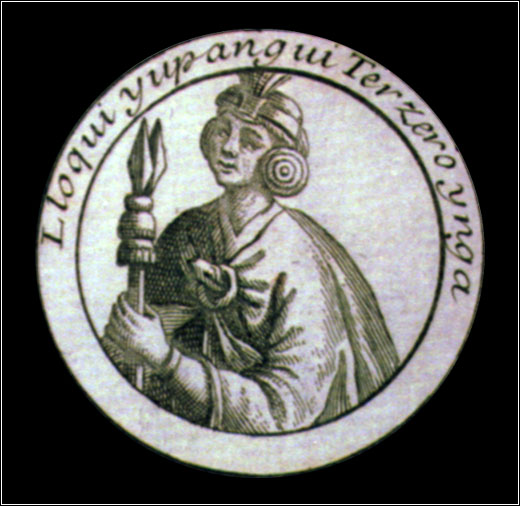
- Emperor Lloque Yupanqui

Sapa Inca of the Kingdom of Cusco
- Reign: c. 1260 – c. 1290
- Predecessor: Sinchi Roca
- Successor: Mayta Cápac
- Born: Lluq'i Yupanki; Cusco
- Died: c. 1290; Cusco
- Spouse: Mama Cora Ocllo Coya
- Issue: Mayta Cápac
- Dynasty: Hurin
- Father: Sinchi Roca
- Mother: Mama Cura

Lloque Yupanqui (c. 1260 – c. 1290, aged approximately circa 30) (Quechua: Lluq'i Yupanki "the glorified lefthander") was the third Sapa Inca of the Kingdom of Cuzco (beginning around 1260) and a member of the Hurin dynasty.

== Family and personality ==
He was the son and successor of Sinchi Roca, though he had an elder brother Manco Sapaca. He was the father of Mayta Cápac. His wife's name is variously given as Mama Cava, also known as Mama Qawa or Mama Cora Ocllo.

The mother of this king was queen Mama Cura.

== Reign ==
Although some chronicles attributed minor conquests to him, others say that he did not wage any wars or that he was even occupied with rebellions.

=== Market ===
He is said to have established the public market in Cuzco and built the Acllahuasi. In the days of the Inca Empire, this institution gathered young women from across the empire; some were given by the Inca as concubines to nobles and warriors and others were dedicated to the cult of the Sun god. Sometimes they were simply servants.

Regnal titles
Preceded by Sinchi Roca	Sapa Inca c. 1260 – c. 1290	Succeeded by Mayta Cápac
