= Mayta Cápac =

Fourth Sapa Inca of the Kingdom of Cuzco

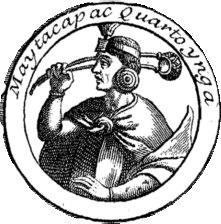
- King Mayta Cápac

Sapa Inca of the Kingdom of Cusco
- Reign: c. 1290 – c. 1320
- Predecessor: Lloque Yupanqui
- Successor: Tarco Huaman
- Born: c. 1290; Cusco, Inca Empire
- Died: c. 1320 (aged c. 30); Cusco, Inca Empire
- Spouse: Mama Cuca
- Issue: Cápac Yupanqui
- Dynasty: Hurin
- Father: Lloque Yupanqui
- Mother: Mama Cora Ocllo Coya

Mayta Cápac (Quechua: Mayta Qhapaq Inka) (c. 1290 – c. 1320) was the fourth Sapa Inca of the Kingdom of Cuzco (beginning around 1290) and a member of the Hurin dynasty.

== Family and personal ==
As a son of King Lloque Yupanqui, Mayta Cápac was his heir and the father of Cápac Yupanqui. His wife's name is given as Mama Tankariy Yachiy, or Tacucaray, or Mama Cuca. His other children were Tarco Huaman, Apu Cunti Mayta, Queco Avcaylli, and Rocca Yupanqui.

Mayta's mother was Mama Cora Ocllo Coya. She died in Cuzco.

== Reign ==
Mayta Capac was referred to as the reformer of the calendar. The chroniclers describe him as a great warrior who conquered territories as far as Lake Titicaca, Arequipa, and Potosí. While in fact, his kingdom was still limited to the valley of Cuzco. In 1134, Mayta Cápac put the regions of Arequipa and Moquegua under the control of the Inca empire.

His great military feat was the subjugation of Alcabisas and Culunchimas tribes.

Regnal titles
| Preceded by Lloque Yupanqui | Sapa Inca c. 1290 – c. 1320 | Succeeded by Cápac Yupanqui |
