= Inca education =

Aspect of life in the Inca Empire

Inca education during the time of the Inca Empire was divided into two principal spheres: education for the ruling class and education for the commoners. From the age of thirteen, the noble class was formally educated by the Amawtakuna (philosopher-scholars) in subjects such as religion, history, government, moral norms and military techniques. Nobles were also trained in the use of the quipu. The general population on the other hand, were passed on practical skills such as agriculture and stonework from their immediate forebears.

The Amawtakuna in Peru constituted a special class of wise men similar to the bards of Great Britain. They included illustrious philosophers, poets, and priests who kept the histories of the Incas alive by imparting the knowledge of their own culture, history, and traditions throughout the kingdom. Considered the most highly educated and respected men in the Empire, the Amawtakuna were largely entrusted with educating those of royal blood, as well as other young members of conquered cultures specially chosen to administer the regions. Thus, education throughout the territories of the Incas was socially discriminatory, barring the rank and file from the formal education that royalty received. The Amawtakuna did ensure that the general population learned Quechua as the language of the Empire, much in the same way the Romans promoted Latin throughout Europe.

== Education of the Inca nobility ==
According to Friar Martín de Murúa, a chronicler of the time, the education of the young novices (yachakuq runa in Quechua) received from the Amawtakuna began at age 13 in the houses of knowledge (Yachaywasi in Quechua) in Cuzco. The Amawtakuna used their erudition to teach the young novices of the empire about Inca religion, history and government, and moral norms. They also ensured a thorough understanding of the quipu, the Incas' unique logical-numerical system which used knotted strings to keep accurate records of troops, supplies, population data, and agricultural inventories. In addition, the young men were given careful training in physical education and military techniques.

Most Inca nobles finished their education around the age of nineteen. After passing the examinations, they received a wara (a special type of underwear) during the formal graduation ceremony as proof of their maturity. Their education concluded with a special ceremony, attended by the Empire's oldest and most illustrious Incas and Amawtakuna, at which the new young nobles, as future rulers, demonstrated their physical prowess and warrior skills and proved their masculinity. The candidates were also presented to the Inca sovereign, who pierced their ears with large pendants and congratulated the young aspirants on the proficiency they had shown, reminding them of the responsibilities attached to their station (and birth, in the case of members of the royalty) and calling them the new "Children of the Sun."

Some historians and authors have pointed to feminine schools ("Aklla wasi" in Quechua) for Inca princesses and other women. It is believed the education given at the Acllahuasi in Cuzco was much different from that given at the other Acllahuasis in the provinces of the empire. The women learned Inca lore and the art of womanhood as well as skills related to governance, but on a limited scale in comparison to the men. Other skills included spinning, weaving, and chicha brewing. When the Spanish chroniclers and conquistadors arrived they viewed these institutions as the Inca version of the European nunnery. Like the men, women were brought into the Acllahuasis from faraway villages throughout the empire after being specifically chosen by Inca agents. After finishing their training, some women would stay to train newly arrived girls, while lower-ranking women might be chosen to be secondary wives of the Sapa Inca, if he wished it, or be sent as rewards to other men who had done something to please the sovereign.

== Popular education ==
The general population did have access to the noble education of the elite people due to the rights given to them, but many did not go to formal schooling. These children got their education from the elder people in their families. The education was primarily on the culture and the artistic aspects of Inca life. Even though education was seen as a right for all people, public education was not formal and many of the children did not go.

== Education after colonization ==
After the arrival of the Europeans, there were two types of Inca education in the empire. As the Europeans were coming in contact with the natives, interracial relationships between noble Inca women and conquistador men occurred. The interracial children had a combination of two upbringings; one of formal European education, and another of cultural education from the Inca side of the family. One of the most notable people to have this sort of upbringing was Garcilaso, the child of an Inca noblewoman and European father. He had the luxury of formal European education and the tutoring from his Inca relatives. This gave him an understanding of how the Europeans treated the Inca.

Another type of education within the Inca Empire was the teaching of Inca culture to the Europeans. When the Europeans arrived, they were surprised to see no written language, but instead the use of the quipu. There were many instances of conquistadors coming into Peru and learning how to use the quipu. One example is Guaman Poma creating a book on the quipu and presenting it to King of Spain Philip II.
