= Yawar Waqaq =

Seventh Sapa Inca of the Kingdom of Cuzco

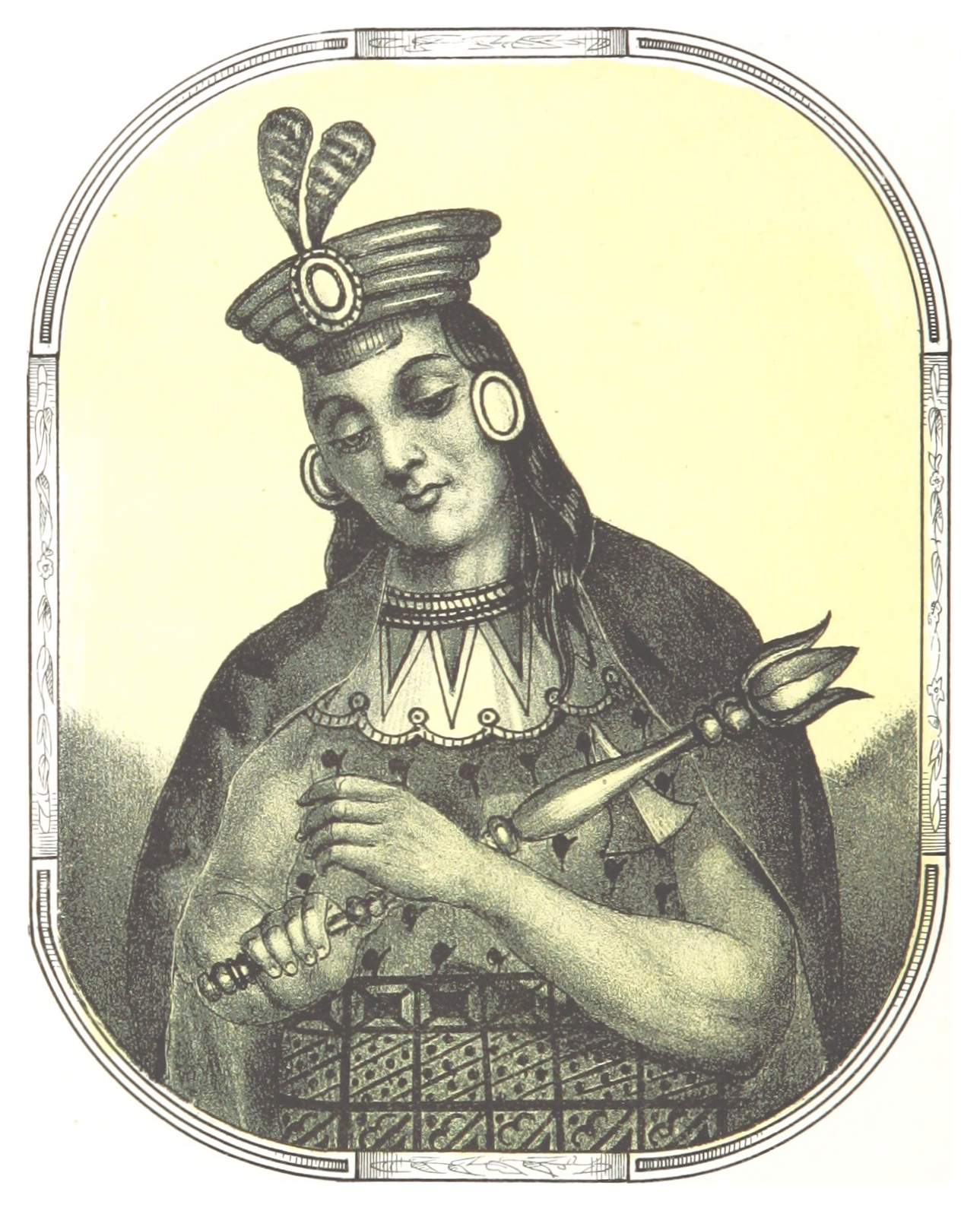
- Yawar Waqaq

Sapa Inca of the Kingdom of Cusco
- Reign: c. 1380 – c. 1410
- Predecessor: Inca Roca
- Successor: Viracocha Inca
- Born: c. 1380, Cusco, Inca Empire
- Died: c. 1410; Cusco, Inca Empire
- Spouse: Mama Chicya (or Chu-Ya)
- Issue: Paucar Ayllu; Pahuac Hualpa Mayta
- Dynasty: Hanan Qusqu
- Father: Inca Roca
- Mother: Mama Micay

Yawar Waqaq (Note: Quechua: yawar blood, waqaq crying, crier; literally "the one who cries blood" or "blood crier") (Hispanicized spellings Yahuar Huacac, Yáhuar Huácac) or Yawar Waqaq Inka (c. 1380 – c. 1410) was the seventh Sapa Inca of the Kingdom of Cusco (beginning around 1380) and the second of the Hanan dynasty.

His father was Inca Roca. Yawar's wife was Mama Chicya (or Chu-Ya) and their sons were Paucar Ayllu and Pahuac Hualpa Mayta. Yawar's name refers to a story that he was abducted as a child by the Sinchi (Warlord) Tokay Qhapaq of the Ayarmaca nation, crying tears of blood over his predicament. He eventually escaped with the help of one of his captor's mistresses, Chimpu Orma. Assuming the reign at the age of 19, Yawar conquered Pillauya, Choyca, Yuco, Chillincay, Taocamarca and Cavinas.

== Notes ==
Regnal titles
Preceded by Inca Roca	Sapa Inca c. 1380 - c. 1410	Succeeded by Viracocha Inca
