= Inca Roca =

Sixth Sapa Inca of the Kingdom of Cuzco

- Inca Roca

Sapa Inca of the Kingdom of Cusco
- Reign: c. 1350 – c. 1380
- Predecessor: Cápac Yupanqui
- Successor: Yawar Waqaq
- Born: c. 1350; Cusco, Inca Empire
- Died: c. 1380 (aged c. 30); Cusco, Inca Empire
- Spouse: Mama Michay
- Issue: Yáhuar Huácac several more children
- Dynasty: Hanan Qusqu
- Father: Cápac Yupanqui
- Mother: Cusi Chimbo

Inca Roca (Quechua: Inka Ruq'a, "magnanimous Inca") (c. 1350 – c. 1380) was the sixth Sapa Inca of the Kingdom of Cusco (beginning around 1350) and the first of the Hanan ("upper") Qusqu dynasty. His wife was Mama Michay, and his son was Yawar Waqaq.

He had four other famous sons: Inca Paucar, Huaman Taysi Inca, and Vicaquirau Inca. Vicaquirau Inca and Roca's nephew Apu Mayta were great warriors, who helped subjugate Muyna, Pinahua and Caytomarca. He died c. 1380.

== Biography ==
Ruq'a's father was the Emperor Cápac Yupanqui, whose heir apparent (by his wife Cusi Hilpay) had been his son Quispe Yupanki.

However, after Qhapaq Yupankiʻs death, the hanan moiety rebelled against the hurin, killed Quispe Yupanki, and gave the throne to Inca Roca, son of another of Qhapaq Yupankiʻs wives, Cusi Chimbo. Inca Roca moved his palace into the hurin section of Cuzco.

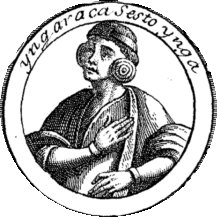
Inca Roca, 17th century

In legend, he is said to have conquered the Chancas (among other peoples), as well as established the yachaywasi, schools for teaching nobles. More soberly, he seems to have improved the irrigation works of Cuzco and neighboring areas, but the Chancas continued to trouble his successors.

Regnal titles
Preceded by Cápac Yupanqui	Sapa Inca c. 1350 – c. 1380	Succeeded by Yawar Waqaq
