= Paqarina =

Paqarina is a Quechua term that ancient Andeans used to describe the place of origin, and final destination, of their ancestors. Paqarinas were associated with physical landmarks such as holes in the ground or lakes. In Incan mythology the word also describes a type of "portal" through which the forces of life and death flow.
