= Villac Umu =

The Willaq Umu ("priest who recounts", Hispanicized spelling Villac Umu) were the High Priests of the Sun in the Inca Empire. They were usually the brothers of the Sapa Inca (the ruler of the empire), and most likely the second most powerful person in the entire empire. This office (in some accounts) was created during the reign of Pachakuti. By the end of the empire, the high priest was also the field marshal in war for the emperor. The names of the Willaq Umu are lost to history except for a few like cunti Mayta

The Sun God in Inca mythology was Inti and the most important god in the pantheon of Inca people. In part, this is why the most powerful priest in the empire was the high priest to the most revered god.

Villac Umu was part of Diego de Almagro's expedition to Chile in 1535 until he defected and escaped one night back to Cusco with his women and servants to aid the Inca uprising.
