= Ayarmaca =

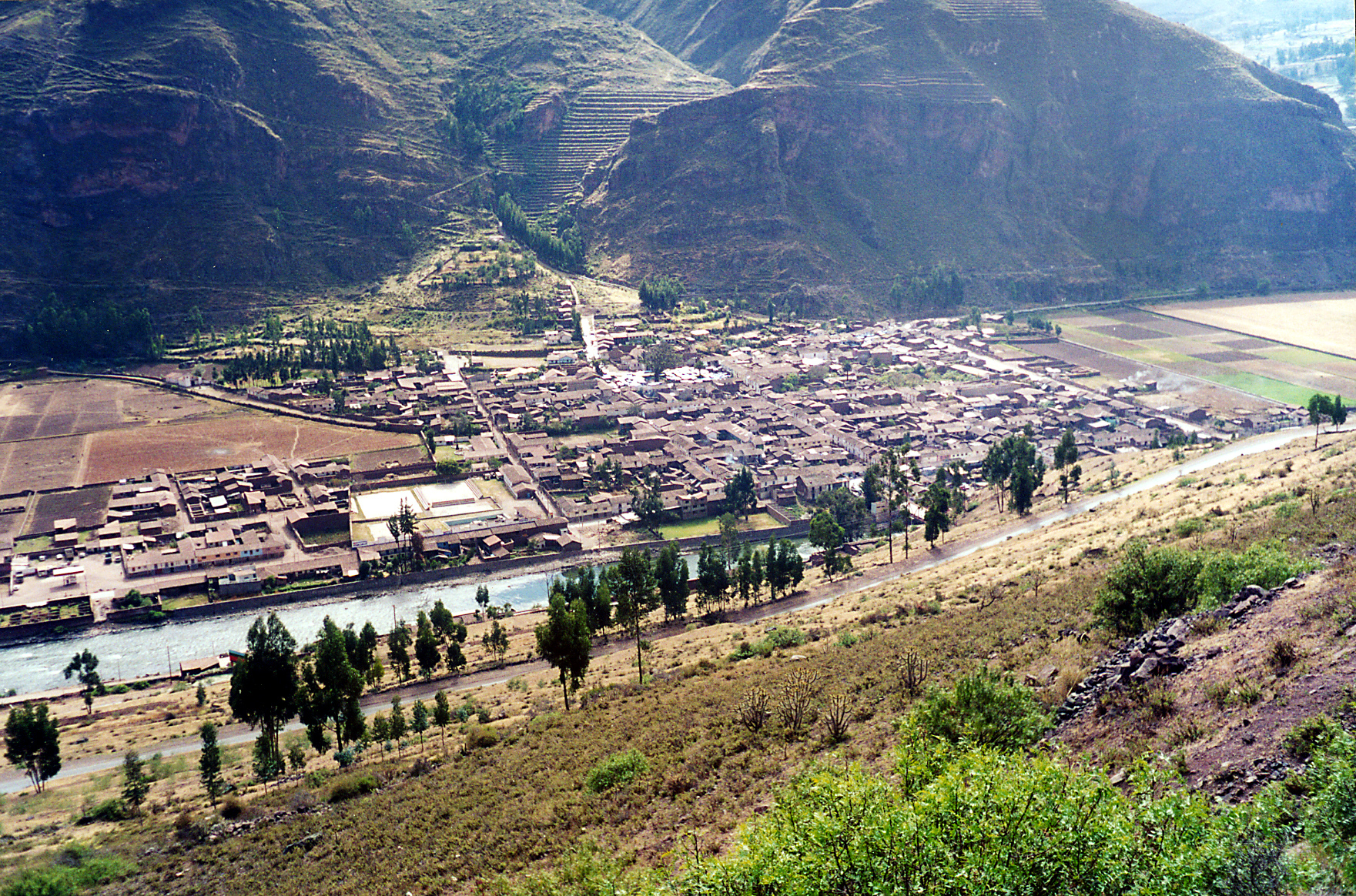
Písac today, this valley was dominated for two centuries by the Ayarmacas until the Inca invasion.

The manor of Ayarmaca was an ethnic group that in the primitive era of the Inca manor was in full splendor, being feared by the Incas and other small Cusco manors of the time.

The Ayarmaca ethnic group resurfaced from the remains of the Wari culture approximately in the 13th century. Probably the manor of Ayarmaca was a state next to the kingdom of Pinagua because in all kinds of documentation both kingdoms appear together.

Probably, Ayar Auca, brother of Ayar Manco (Manco Cápac) in the legend of the Ayar Brothers was the head of the manor of Ayarmaca, because as the legend says, it was he who put the name of Acamama (Pile of stones) to the valley of Cusco.

== Geographic domains ==
The Ayarmaca territory occupied the entire north and northwest of Department of Cusco, including Chinchero, Ollantaytambo, Calca, Chita and Písac, while the Pinagua occupied the eastern towns of Quispicancha, Pikillaqta Sailla and even the Lucre Lake.

This state of imperial character had 18 cities under its dominion and sovereignty. It is currently reduced to a small space that is called the Ayarmaca neighborhood, in the San Sebastián district.

== Time of splendor ==
The Ayarmaca ethnic group, as seen in its geographical domains larger and more influential than any other nearby manor, maintained wars with other kingdoms including the Incas, with whom they fought from its beginnings until the emergence of Sapa Inca Pachacuti, that is, for 2 centuries.

== Final ==
At the end of the 14th century, a people on the way to becoming an empire threatened the Ayarmacas in the south and west, it was the Chankas.

This pseudo empire succeeded in intimidating the great manor of Ayamarca, however the tiny Inca manor would win the fierce Chankas in a battle, this made the surrounding peoples helped the Incas.

After the Inca victory, the Ayarmacas would be divided into three kingdoms, and later their domains would be annexed to the growing Inca Empire state.
