= Juan de Betanzos =

Spanish writer and historian (1510–1576)

Juan Diez de Betanzos (b. Betanzos, Spain 1510 – d. Cusco, Peru March 1, 1576) wrote one of the most important sources on the conquest of the Inca civilization, Narrative of the Incas. He based this account of the Incas on the testimony of his wife Cuxirimay Ocllo (Doña Angelina), who had been previously married to Inca King Atahualpa as well as conducting interviews of Incas who had taken part in the Battle of Cajamarca or been in Atahualpa's camp.

The Narrative of the Incas is rare in coming from the Indian perspective. In the absence of written Inca sources, it is also relatively unique in providing us with an insight into Inca civilization before the conquest with early expansion, the development of the kingdom of Cuzco by Yupanqui, and the great imperial policies of Huayna Capac. It also provides an insight into the civil war between Huáscar and Atahualpa that ravaged the Inca civilization immediately prior to the arrival of Francisco Pizarro. However, coming from Atahualpa's wife's point of view, the source is biased against Huáscar.
