= 1961 =

1961 in various calendars
- Gregorian calendar: 1961; MCMLXI
- Ab urbe condita: 2714
- Armenian calendar: 1410; ԹՎ ՌՆԺ
- Assyrian calendar: 6711
- Baháʼí calendar: 117–118
- Balinese saka calendar: 1882–1883
- Bengali calendar: 1367–1368
- Berber calendar: 2911
- British Regnal year: 9 Eliz. 2 – 10 Eliz. 2
- Buddhist calendar: 2505
- Burmese calendar: 1323
- Byzantine calendar: 7469–7470
- Chinese calendar: 庚子年 (Metal Rat); 4658 or 4451 — to — 辛丑年 (Metal Ox); 4659 or 4452
- Coptic calendar: 1677–1678
- Discordian calendar: 3127
- Ethiopian calendar: 1953–1954
- Hebrew calendar: 5721–5722
- Hindu calendars
- Vikram Samvat: 2017–2018
- Shaka Samvat: 1882–1883
- Kali Yuga: 5061–5062
- Holocene calendar: 11961
- Igbo calendar: 961–962
- Iranian calendar: 1339–1340
- Islamic calendar: 1380–1381
- Japanese calendar: Shōwa 36 (昭和３６年)
- Javanese calendar: 1892–1893
- Juche calendar: 50
- Julian calendar: Gregorian minus 13 days
- Korean calendar: 4294
- Minguo calendar: ROC 50 民國50年
- Nanakshahi calendar: 493
- Thai solar calendar: 2504
- Tibetan calendar: ལྕགས་ཕོ་བྱི་བ་ལོ་ (male Iron-Rat); 2087 or 1706 or 934 — to — ལྕགས་མོ་གླང་ལོ་ (female Iron-Ox); 2088 or 1707 or 935

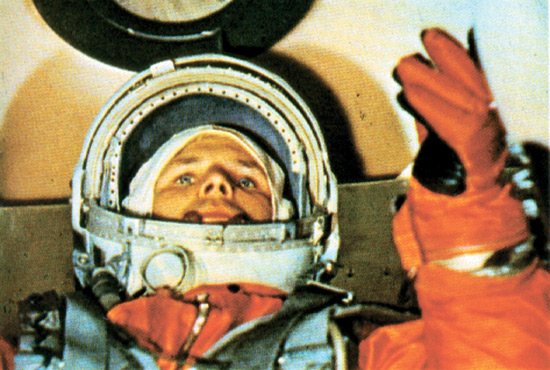
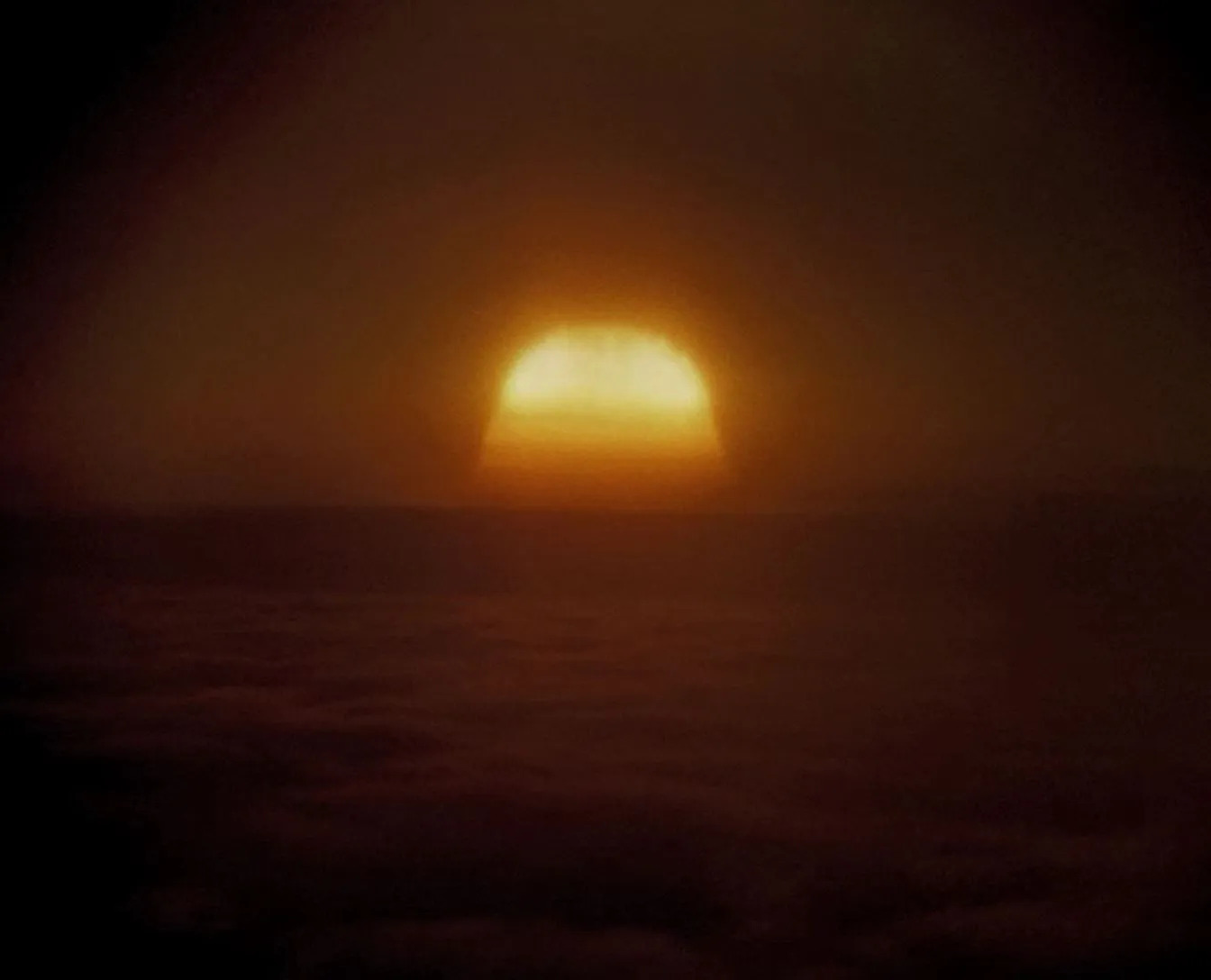
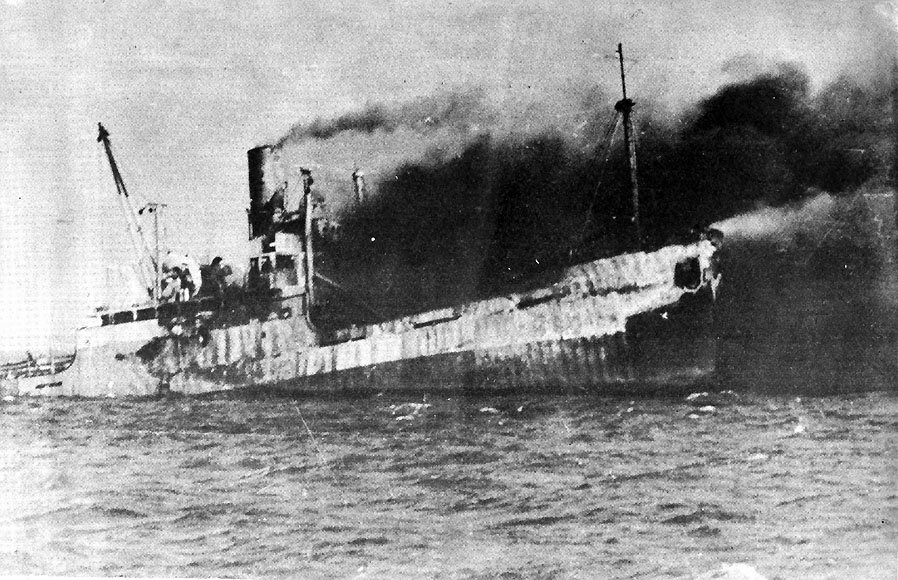
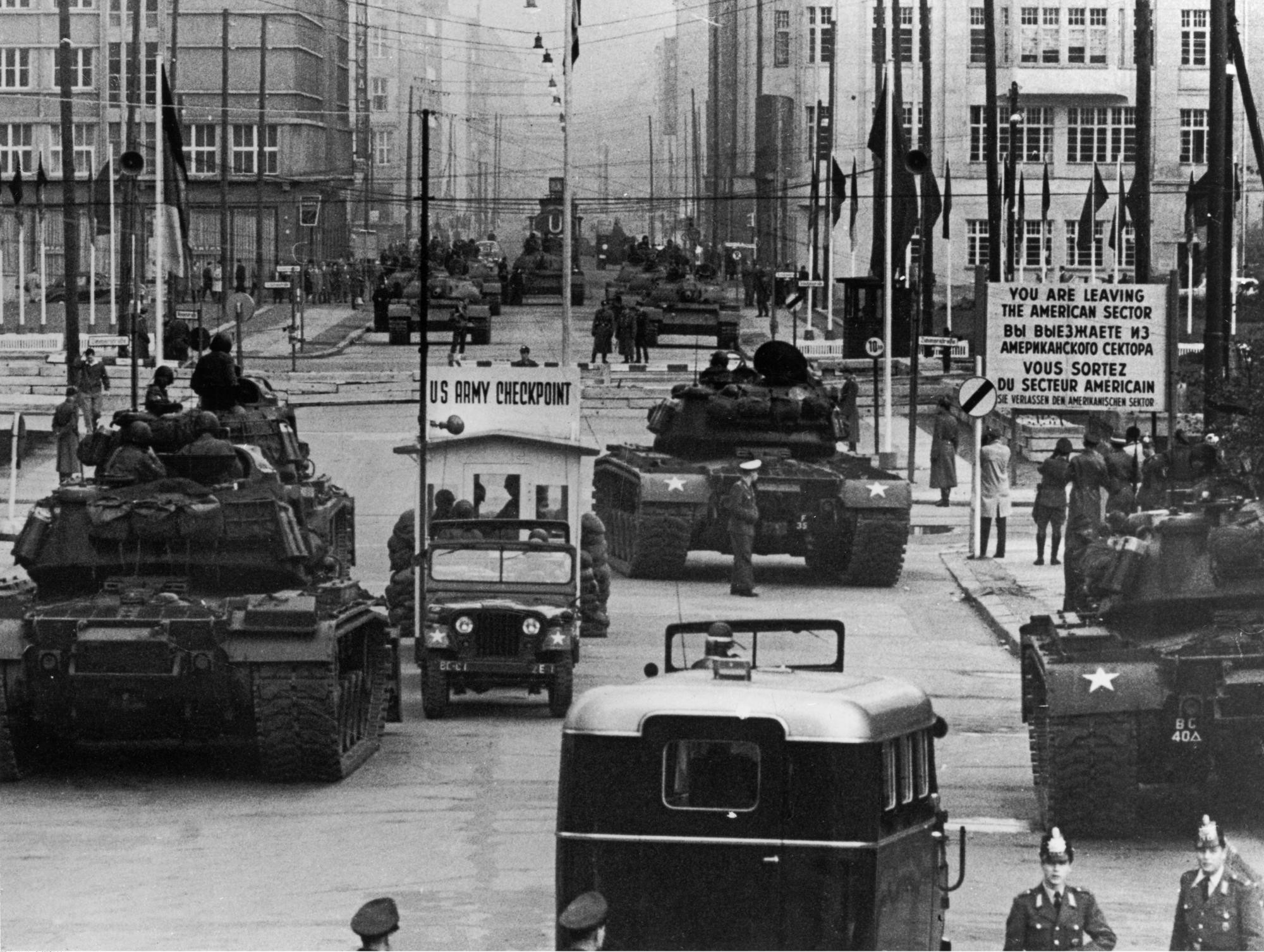
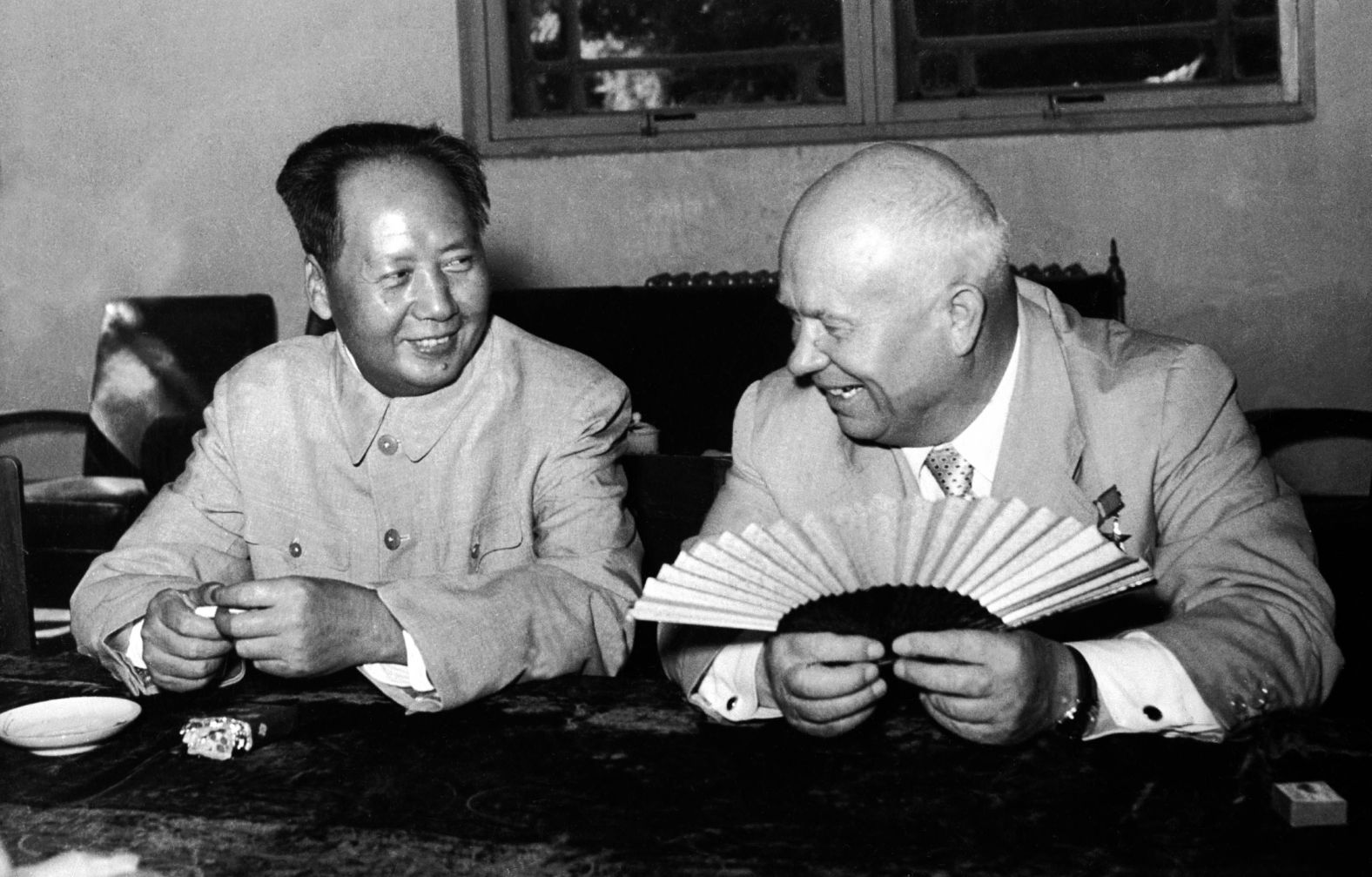
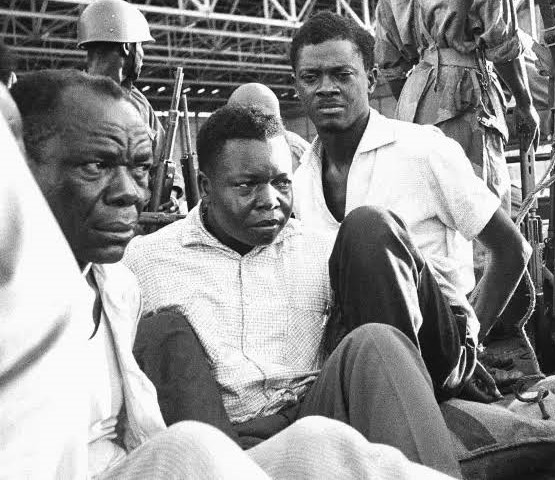
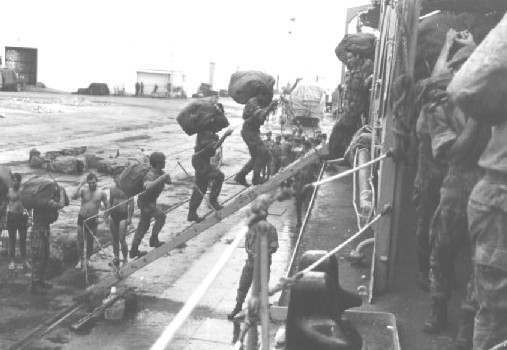
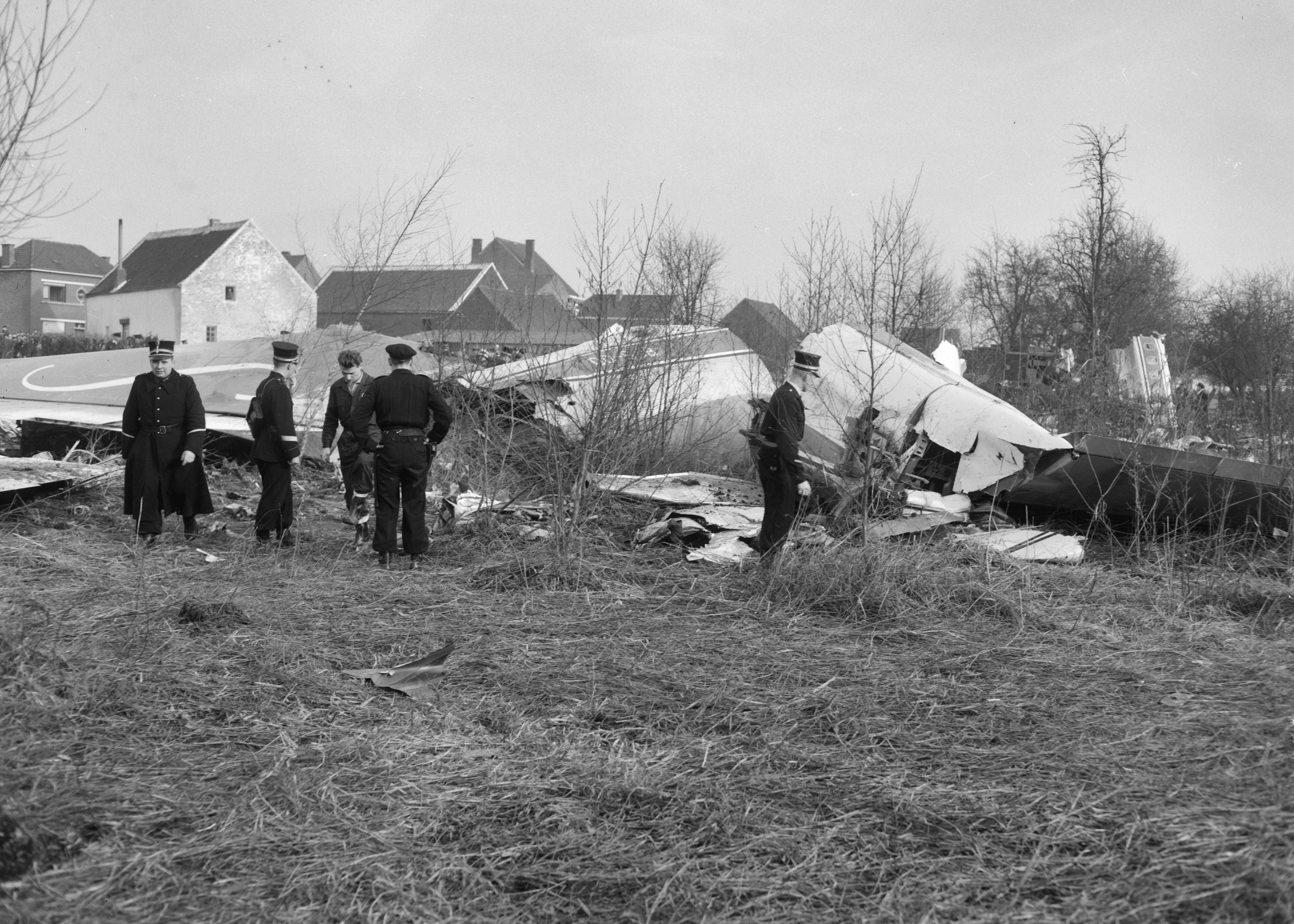
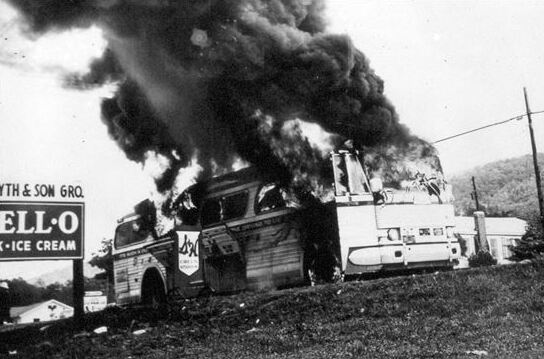
From top to bottom, left to right: Yuri Gagarin becomes the first human in space aboard Vostok 1; the Tsar Bomba is detonated by the Soviet Union; the Bay of Pigs invasion is launched against Cuba; the Berlin Crisis of 1961 heightens Cold War tensions between the United States and the Soviet Union; the Sino-Soviet split deepens divisions between the People's Republic of China and the Soviet Union; the Assassination of Patrice Lumumba intensifies the Congo Crisis; the Portuguese Colonial War begins in Angola against Portugal; the Sabena Flight 548 crash occurs in Belgium; and the Freedom Rides challenge segregation in the American South.

1961 (MCMLXI) was a common year starting on Sunday of the Gregorian calendar, the 1961st year of the Common Era (CE) and Anno Domini (AD) designations, the 961st year of the 2nd millennium, the 61st year of the 20th century, and the 2nd year of the 1960s decade.

== Events ==
=== January ===
- January 1 – Monetary reform in the Soviet Union.
- January 3
  - United States President Dwight D. Eisenhower announces that the United States has severed diplomatic and consular relations with Cuba (Cuba–United States relations are restored in 2015).
  - Aero Flight 311 (Koivulahti air disaster): Douglas DC-3C OH-LCC of Finnish airline Aero crashes near Kvevlax (Koivulahti), on approach to Vaasa Airport in Finland, killing all 25 on board, due to pilot error: an investigation finds that the captain and first officer were both exhausted for lack of sleep, and had consumed excessive amounts of alcohol at the time of the crash.
- January 5 – After the 1960 military coup, General Cemal Gürsel forms the new government of Turkey (25th government).
- January 7 – Following a four-day conference in Casablanca, five African chiefs of state announce plans for a NATO-type African organization to ensure common defense. The Charter of Casablanca involves the Casablanca Group: Morocco, the United Arab Republic, Ghana, Guinea, and Mali.
- January 8 – In France, a referendum supports Charles de Gaulle's policies on independence for Algeria.
- January 9 – British authorities announce they have uncovered a large Soviet spy ring, the Portland spy ring, in London.
- January 17
  - President Dwight Eisenhower gives his final State of the Union Address to Congress. In a Farewell Address the same day, he warns of the increasing power of a "military–industrial complex."
  - Patrice Lumumba of the Republic of Congo is assassinated.
- January 20 – John F. Kennedy is inaugurated as the 35th President of the United States, becoming the second-youngest president to be sworn in.
- January 23 – Congress of Venezuela adopts a new constitution (in force until 1999).
- January 24 – 1961 Goldsboro B-52 crash: A B-52 Stratofortress, carrying two nuclear bombs, crashes near Goldsboro, North Carolina.
- January 25
  - In Washington, D.C., President John F. Kennedy delivers the first live presidential news conference. In it, he announces that the Soviet Union has freed the two surviving crewmen from the July 1 1960 RB-47 shootdown incident involving a USAF reconnaissance aircraft and a MiG-19 over the Barents Sea.
  - Acting to halt 'leftist excesses', a junta composed of two army officers and four civilians takes over El Salvador, ousting another junta that had ruled for three months.
- January 27 – Soviet submarine S-80 sinks in the Barents Sea, killing all 68 crew.
- January 28 – Supercar, the first family sci-fi TV series filmed in Supermarionation, debuts on ATV in the UK.
- January 30 – President John F. Kennedy delivers his first State of the Union Address.
- January 31 – Ham, a 37-pound (17-kg) male chimpanzee, is rocketed into space aboard Mercury-Redstone 2, in a test of the Project Mercury spacecraft, designed to carry United States astronauts into space.

=== February ===
- February 1 – The United States tests its first Minuteman I intercontinental ballistic missile.
- February 4 – The Portuguese Colonial War begins in Angola.
- February 5–9 – In Congo, President Joseph Kasa-Vubu names Joseph Iléo as the new Prime Minister.
- February 12 – The USSR launches Venera 1 towards Venus.
- February 13 – The Congo government announces that villagers have killed Patrice Lumumba.
- February 14 – Discovery of the chemical elements: Element 103, Lawrencium, is first synthesized in Berkeley, California.
- February 15
  - United States President John F. Kennedy warns the Soviet Union to avoid interfering with the United Nations' pacification of the Congo.
  - Sabena Flight 548 crashes near Brussels, Belgium, killing 73, including the entire United States figure skating team and several coaches.
  - The total solar eclipse of February 15, 1961, visible in the southern part of Europe, occurs.
- February 26 – Hassan II is pronounced King of Morocco.

=== March ===
- March–April – Drilling for Project Mohole is undertaken off the coast of Guadalupe Island, Mexico.
- March 1 – United States President John F. Kennedy establishes the Peace Corps.
- March 3 – Hassan II is crowned King of Morocco.
- March 8
  - Max Conrad circumnavigates the earth by light plane in 8 days, 18 hours and 49 minutes, setting a new world record.
  - The first U.S. Polaris submarines arrive at Holy Loch in Scotland.
- March 13
  - 1961 Kurenivka mudslide: A dam bursts in Kiev, USSR, killing 145.
  - United States delegate to the United Nations Security Council Adlai Stevenson votes against Portuguese policies in Africa.
  - United States President John F. Kennedy proposes a long-term "Alliance for Progress", between the United States and Latin America.
  - Cyprus joins the Commonwealth of Nations, becoming the first small country in the Commonwealth.
  - Black and white £5 notes cease to be legal tender in the UK.
  - Monash University in Melbourne, Australia takes in its first students.
  - A second B-52 crashes near Yuba City, California, after cabin pressure is lost and the fuel runs out. Two nuclear weapons are found unexploded.
- March 15
  - South Africa announces it will withdraw from the Commonwealth of Nations, upon becoming a republic (31 May). The nation rejoins the organization in 1994.
  - The Union of Peoples of Angola, led by Holden Roberto, attacks strategic locations in the north of Angola. These events result in the beginning of the colonial war with Portugal.
- March 18
  - A ceasefire takes effect in the Algerian War of Independence.
  - "Nous les amoureux" sung by Jean-Claude Pascal (music by Jacques Datin, lyrics by Maurice Vidalin) wins the Eurovision Song Contest 1961 (staged in Cannes) for Luxembourg.
- March 29 – The Twenty-third Amendment to the United States Constitution is ratified, allowing residents of Washington, D.C. to vote in presidential elections.
- March 30 – The Single Convention on Narcotic Drugs is signed at New York.

=== April ===
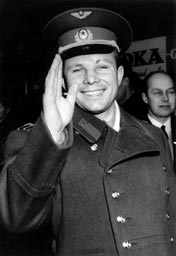
April 12: Soviet cosmonaut Yuri Gagarin becomes the first human to fly in outer space

- April 5 – The New Guinea Council of Western Papua is installed.
- April 8 – British India Steam Navigation Company passenger ship MV Dara blows up and sinks off Dubai; 238 passengers and crew are killed.
- April 10 – South African golfer Gary Player becomes the first non-American to win the Masters Tournament.
- April 11 – The trial of Nazi Adolf Eichmann begins in Jerusalem.
- April 12
  - Vostok 1: Soviet cosmonaut Yuri Gagarin becomes the first human in space, orbiting the Earth once before parachuting to the ground.
  - Albert Kalonji takes the title Emperor Albert I Kalonji of South Kasai.
- April 13 – In Portugal, a coup attempt against António de Oliveira Salazar fails.
- April 17
  - The U.S.-backed Bay of Pigs Invasion of Cuba begins; it fails by April 19.
  - The 33rd Academy Awards ceremony is held in Santa Monica, California: The Apartment (1960) wins most awards, including Best Picture.
- April 18 – Portugal sends its first military reinforcement to Angola.
- April 20 – Fidel Castro announces that the Bay of Pigs Invasion has been foiled.
- April 22 – Algiers putsch: Four French generals who oppose de Gaulle's policies in Algeria fail in a coup attempt.
- April 24 – The Swedish warship Vasa, which sank on her maiden voyage in 1628, is recovered from Stockholm Harbor.
- April 27
  - Sierra Leone becomes independent from the United Kingdom.
  - President Kennedy urges newspapers to consider national interest in times of struggle against "a monolithic and ruthless conspiracy", in an address before the American Newspaper Publishers Association.

=== May ===
- May 1 – National Airlines Flight 337, internal to Florida, is forced by an armed hijacker to fly to Cuba, the first of a spate of such aircraft hijackings.
- May 4 – U.S. Freedom Riders begin interstate bus rides, to test the new U.S. Supreme Court integration decision.
- May 5 – Mercury program: Alan Shepard becomes the first American in space, aboard Mercury-Redstone 3.
- May 6 – Tottenham Hotspur F.C. becomes the first team in the 20th century to win the English league and cup double. As of 2025, this is the last time Tottenham have won the English League.
- May 8 – British intelligence officer George Blake is sentenced to 42 years imprisonment for spying, having been found guilty of being a double agent in the pay of the Soviet Union, the longest non-life sentence ever handed down by a British court.
- May 9 – In a speech on "Television and the Public Interest" to the National Association of Broadcasters in the United States, FCC chairman Newton N. Minow describes commercial television programming as a "vast wasteland".
- May 14 – Civil rights movement: A Freedom Riders bus is fire-bombed near Anniston, Alabama, and the civil rights protestors are beaten by an angry mob of Ku Klux Klan members.
- May 15 – J. Heinrich Matthaei alone performs the Poly-U-Experiment, and is the first person to recognize and understand the genetic code. This is the birthdate of modern genetics.
- May 16 – Park Chung Hee takes over in a military coup, in South Korea.
- May 19 – Venera 1 becomes the first man-made object to fly-by another planet by passing Venus (however, the probe lost contact with Earth a month earlier, and does not send back any data).
- May 21 – Civil rights movement: Alabama Governor John Patterson declares martial law in an attempt to restore order, after race riots break out.
- May 22 – 1961 New South Wales earthquake.
- May 24 – Civil rights movement: Freedom Riders are arrested in Jackson, Mississippi for "disturbing the peace", after disembarking from their bus.
- May 25 – Apollo program: U.S. President Kennedy announces, before a special joint session of Congress, that the United States "should commit itself to achieving the goal, before this decade is out, of landing a man on the Moon and returning him safely to the Earth".
- May 27 – Tunku Abdul Rahman, Prime Minister of Malaya, holds a press conference in Singapore, announcing his idea to form the Federation of Malaysia, comprising Malaya, Singapore, Sarawak, Brunei and North Borneo (Sabah).
- May 28 – Peter Benenson's article "The Forgotten Prisoners" is published in several internationally read newspapers. This is later considered the founding of the human rights organization Amnesty International.
- May 30 – Rafael Leónidas Trujillo, ruler of the Dominican Republic since 1930, is killed in an ambush.
- May 31
  - In France, rebel generals Maurice Challe and Andre Zelelr are sentenced to 15 years in prison.
  - South Africa becomes a republic, officially leaves the Commonwealth of Nations, and achieves complete independence from the United Kingdom.
  - Benfica beats FC Barcelona 3–2 at Wankdorf Stadium, Bern and wins the 1960–61 European Cup in association football.

=== June ===
- June 1 – Ethiopia experiences its most devastating earthquake of the 20th century, with a magnitude of 6.7. The town of Majete is destroyed, 45% of the houses in Karakore collapse, 17 kilometers (11 mi) of the main road north of Karakore are damaged by landslides and fissures, and 5,000 inhabitants in the area are left homeless.
- June 4 – Vienna summit: John F. Kennedy and Nikita Khrushchev meet during two days in Vienna. They discuss nuclear tests, disarmament and Germany.
- June 12 – A patent for the body electrode invented by Richard M. Berman and Bernard Schwartz is applied for.
- June 16 – Soviet ballet dancer Rudolf Nureyev defects to the West at Paris–Le Bourget Airport while on tour with the Kirov Ballet.
- June 17
  - A Paris-to-Strasbourg train derails near Vitry-le-François; 24 are killed, 109 injured.
  - The New Democratic Party of Canada is founded, with the merger of the Cooperative Commonwealth Federation (CCF) and the Canadian Labour Congress.
- June 19 – The British protectorate ends in Kuwait and it becomes an emirate.
- June 22 – Moise Tshombe is released for lack of evidence of his connection to the murder of Patrice Lumumba.
- June 23 – The Antarctic Treaty comes into effect.
- June 25 – Iraqi president Abd al-Karim Qasim announces his intention to annex newly independent Kuwait (such an annexation will occur in 1990).

=== July ===
- July 4 – Soviet submarine K-19 suffers a reactor leak in the North Atlantic.
- July 5 – The first Israeli rocket, Shavit 2, is launched.
- July 7 – A coal mine in Czechoslovakia has one of its sections closed off in order to extinguish a fire and prevent an explosion, causing the suffocation of 108 miners still present.
- July 12
  - A Czechoslovak Ilyushin Il-18 crashes while attempting to land at Casablanca, Morocco, killing all 72 on board.
  - Two dams that supply water to the city of Pune in India burst, causing the death of more than 1000 residents.
- July 19 – Trans World Airlines becomes the first airline to show regularly scheduled movies during its flights, presenting By Love Possessed to 1st-class passengers.
- July 21 – Mercury program: Gus Grissom, piloting the Mercury-Redstone 4 spacecraft Liberty Bell 7, becomes the second American to go into space (sub-orbital). After splashdown, the hatch prematurely opens, and the spacecraft sinks (it is recovered in 1999).
- July 25 – U.S. President John F. Kennedy gives a widely watched TV speech on the Berlin Crisis, warning "we will not be driven out of Berlin." Kennedy urges Americans to build fallout shelters, setting off a four-month debate on civil defense.
- July 31 – Ireland submits the first application from a non-founding country to join the European Economic Community.

=== August ===
- August – The United States founds the Alliance for Progress.
- August 6 – Vostok 2: Soviet cosmonaut Gherman Titov becomes the second human to orbit the Earth, and the first to be in outer space for more than one day.
- August 7 – Vostok 2 lands in the Soviet Union.
- August 10 – The United Kingdom applies for membership in the European Economic Community.
- August 11 – An annular solar eclipse is visible from the Southern Ocean.
- August 13 – Berlin Crisis of 1961: Construction of the Berlin Wall begins, restricting movement between East Berlin and West Berlin, and forming a clear boundary between West Germany and East Germany, Western Europe and Eastern Europe (until 1989, when Berlin and Germany both reunified in 1990, following the Fall of the Berlin Wall). On August 22 Ida Siekmann jumps from a window in her tenement building trying to flee to the West, becoming the first of at least 138 deaths at the Wall.
- August 21 – Rebel leader Jomo Kenyatta is released from prison in Kenya.
- August 25 – João Goulart replaces Jânio Quadros as President of Brazil (he is ousted in 1964).
- August 29 – A French military aircraft clips a cable of the aerial tramway connecting Pointe Helbronner and the Aiguille du Midi in the French Alps. Three cars of the tramway fall, killing five people, but the remaining 63 cable car passengers are rescued and the pilot lands his plane safely.
- August 30 – The Convention on the Reduction of Statelessness is signed at the United Nations in New York, coming into effect December 13, 1975.

=== September ===
- September 1
  - The Eritrean War of Independence begins with the Battle of Adal in which Hamid Idris Awate and his companions shoot at Ethiopian police and military. The war will continue until 1991.
  - The first meeting of the Non-Aligned Movement is held in Belgrade. The Soviet Union resumes nuclear testing, escalating fears over the ongoing Berlin Crisis.
- September 10 – During the F1 Italian Grand Prix on the circuit of Monza, German Wolfgang von Trips, driving a Ferrari, crashes into a stand, killing 14 spectators and himself.
- September 12 – The African and Malagasy Union is founded.
- September 17
  - Military rulers in Turkey hang former prime minister Adnan Menderes, together with the former Minister of Foreign Affairs Fatin Rüştü Zorlu and former Minister of Finance Hasan Polatkan.
  - London police arrest over 1,300 protesters in Trafalgar Square during a Campaign for Nuclear Disarmament rally.
  - The world's first retractable roof stadium, the Civic Arena, opens in Pittsburgh, Pennsylvania, United States.
- September 18 – 1961 Ndola United Nations DC-6 crash: Secretary-General of the United Nations Dag Hammarskjöld is one of 16 to die in an air crash en route to Katanga, Congo.
- September 21 – In France, the Organisation de l'armée secrète (OAS) slips an anti-de Gaulle message into TV programming.
- September 24
  - The old Deutsche Opernhaus in the Berlin neighborhood of Charlottenburg is returned to its newly rebuilt house, as the Deutsche Oper Berlin.
  - In the U.S., the Walt Disney anthology television series, renamed Walt Disney's Wonderful World of Color, moves from ABC to NBC after seven years on the air, and begins telecasting its programs in color for the first time. Years later, after Disney's death, the still-on-the-air program will be renamed The Wonderful World of Disney.
- September 28 – 1961 Syrian coup d'état: A military coup in Damascus, Syria effectively ends the United Arab Republic, the union between Egypt and Syria.
- September 30 – The Organisation for Economic Co-operation and Development (OECD) is formed to replace the Organisation for European Economic Co-operation (OEEC).

=== October ===
- October 1 – Unification Day (Cameroon): The formerly British Southern Cameroons gains independence from the United Kingdom by vote of the UN General Assembly and joins with formerly French Cameroun to form the Federal Republic of Cameroon.
- October 10 – A volcanic eruption on Tristan da Cunha causes the whole population to be evacuated to Britain, where they will remain until 1963.
- October 12 – The death penalty is abolished in New Zealand.
- October 17 – 1961 Paris massacre: French police in Paris attack about 30,000 people protesting against a curfew applied solely to Algerians. The official death toll is 3, but human rights groups claim 240 dead.
- October 19 – The Arab League takes over protecting Kuwait; the last British troops leave.
- October 25 – The first edition of Private Eye, the British satirical magazine, is published.
- October 26 – Cemal Gürsel becomes the fourth president of Turkey (his former title is head of state and government; he is elected as president by constitutional referendum).
- October 27
  - An armistice begins in Katanga, Congo.
  - Mongolia and Mauritania join the United Nations.
  - Berlin Crisis: Confrontation at Checkpoint Charlie – A standoff between Soviet and American tanks in Berlin, Germany, heightens Cold War tensions.
  - Fahrettin Özdilek becomes the acting prime minister of Turkey.
- October 29
  - DZBB-TV Channel 7, the Philippines' third TV station, is launched.
  - Devrim, the first ever car designed and produced in Turkey, is released. The project has been completed in only 130 days almost from scratch, a period including decision on the project, research, design, development and production of four vehicles.
- October 30
  - Nuclear weapons testing: The Soviet Union detonates a 58-megaton yield hydrogen bomb known as Tsar Bomba, over Novaya Zemlya (it remains the largest ever man-made explosion).
  - The Note Crisis: The Soviet Union issues a diplomatic note to Finland, proposing military co-operation.
- October 31
  - Hurricane Hattie devastates Belize City, Belize killing over 270. After the hurricane, the capital moves to the inland city of Belmopan.
  - Joseph Stalin's body is removed from the Lenin Mausoleum in Moscow.

=== November ===
- November 1
  - The Hungry generation Movement is launched in Calcutta, India.
  - The U.S. Interstate Commerce Commission's federal order banning segregation at all interstate public facilities officially comes into effect.
- November 2 – Kean opens at Broadway Theater in New York City for 92 performances.
- November 3 – The United Nations General Assembly unanimously elects Burmese diplomat U Thant to the position of acting Secretary-General.
- November 8 – Imperial Airlines Flight 201/8 crashes while attempting to land at Richmond, Virginia, United States, killing 77 people on board.
- November 9 – Robert White records a world air speed record of 4,093 mph (6,587 km/h), in an X-15.
- November 11
  - Congolese soldiers murder 13 Italian United Nations pilots.
  - Stalingrad is renamed Volgograd.
- November 14 – The Yves Saint Laurent luxury fashion brand is founded in Rue La Boetie, Paris (France), by Yves Saint Laurent and Pierre Bergé.
- November 17 – Michael Rockefeller, son of Governor of New York and later Vice President Nelson Rockefeller, disappears in the jungles of New Guinea.
- November 18 – U.S. President John F. Kennedy sends 18,000 "military advisors" to South Vietnam.
- November 19 – Rebellion of the Pilots: A military uprising overthrows the Trujillo regime in the Dominican Republic.
- November 20 – İsmet İnönü of the CHP forms the new government of Turkey (26th government, first coalition in Turkey, partner AP).
- November 24 – The World Food Programme (WFP) is formed as a temporary United Nations program.
- November 29 – Enos, a chimpanzee in the U.S. Project Mercury program, is launched into space. The spacecraft orbits the Earth twice and returns safely.
- November 30 – The Soviet Union vetoes Kuwait's application for United Nations membership.

=== December ===
- December 1 – Netherlands New Guinea raises the new Morning Star flag, and changes its name to West Papua.
- December 2 – Cold War: In a nationally broadcast speech, Cuban leader Fidel Castro announces he is a Marxist–Leninist, and that Cuba will adopt socialism.
- December 5 – U.S. President John F. Kennedy gives support to the Volta Dam project in Ghana.
- December 9
  - Tanganyika gains independence from the United Kingdom as a Commonwealth realm, with Julius Nyerere as its first Prime Minister, with Queen Elizabeth II as Queen of Tanganyika, and represented locally by the Governor-General of Tanganyika.
  - 1961 Australian federal election: Robert Menzies' Liberal/Country Coalition Government is re-elected with a one-seat majority, narrowly defeating the Labor Party led by Arthur Calwell. One of the closest election results in Australian history, such a result will not be replicated again until 2016. Notably, former Prime Minister Earle Page loses his seat, although he dies a few days later, never knowing the result.
- December 10 – Albania–Soviet relations: The Soviet Union severs diplomatic relations with Albania.
- December 11
  - American involvement in the Vietnam War officially begins, as the first American helicopters arrive in Saigon, along with 400 U.S. personnel. On December 22 the first U.S. soldier is killed in Vietnam.
  - Adolf Eichmann is pronounced guilty of crimes against humanity for his part in The Holocaust by a war crimes tribunal of three Israeli judges. On December 15 he is sentenced to death.
- December 14 – Walt Disney's first live-action Technicolor musical, Babes in Toyland, a remake of the famous Victor Herbert operetta, is released, but flops at the box office.
- December 17 – A circus tent fire in Niterói, Brazil kills 323.
- December 18 – 1961 Indian annexation of Goa: India opens hostilities in its annexation of Portuguese India, the colonies of Goa, Damao and Diu.
- December 19
  - The Portuguese surrender Goa to India, after 400 years of Portuguese rule.
  - Indonesian president Sukarno announces that he will take West Irian by force, if necessary.
- December 21 – In Congo, Katangan prime minister Moise Tshombe recognizes the Congolese constitution.
- December 23 – Luxembourg's national holiday, the Grand Duke's Official Birthday, is set on June 23 by Grand Ducal decree.
- December 30 – Congolese troops capture Albert Kalonji of South Kasai (who soon escapes).
- December 31 – Ireland's first national television station, Telefís Éireann (later Raidió Teilifís Éireann), begins broadcasting.

== Births ==
=== January ===
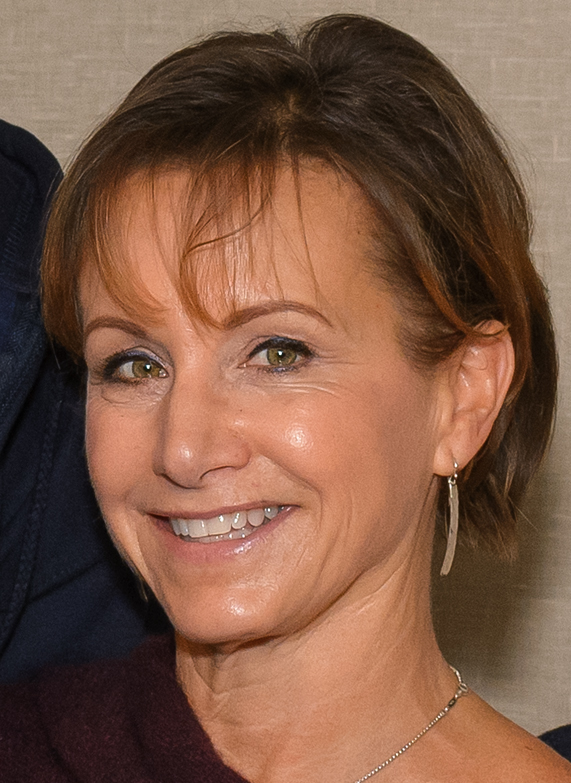
Gabrielle Carteris

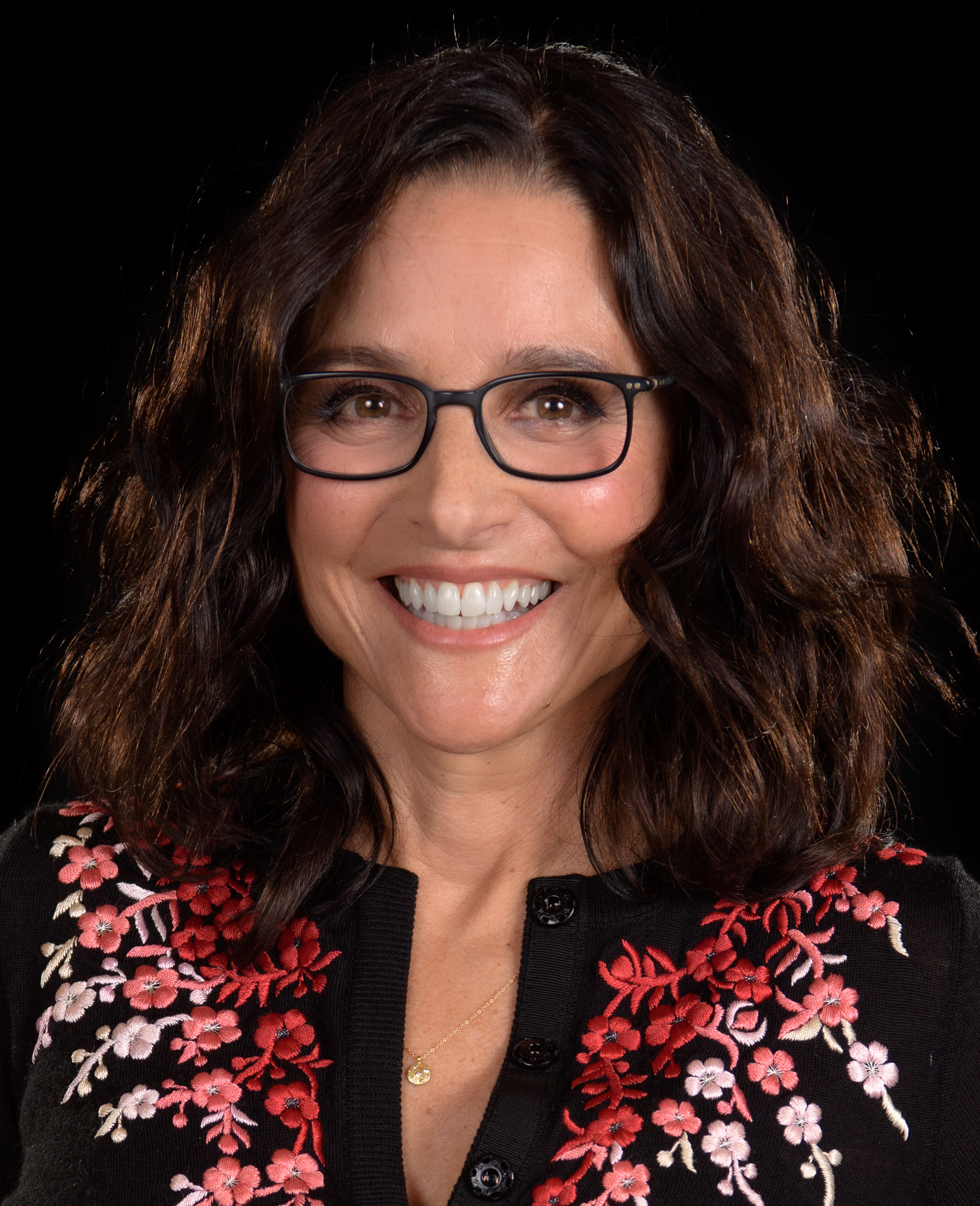
Julia Louis-Dreyfus

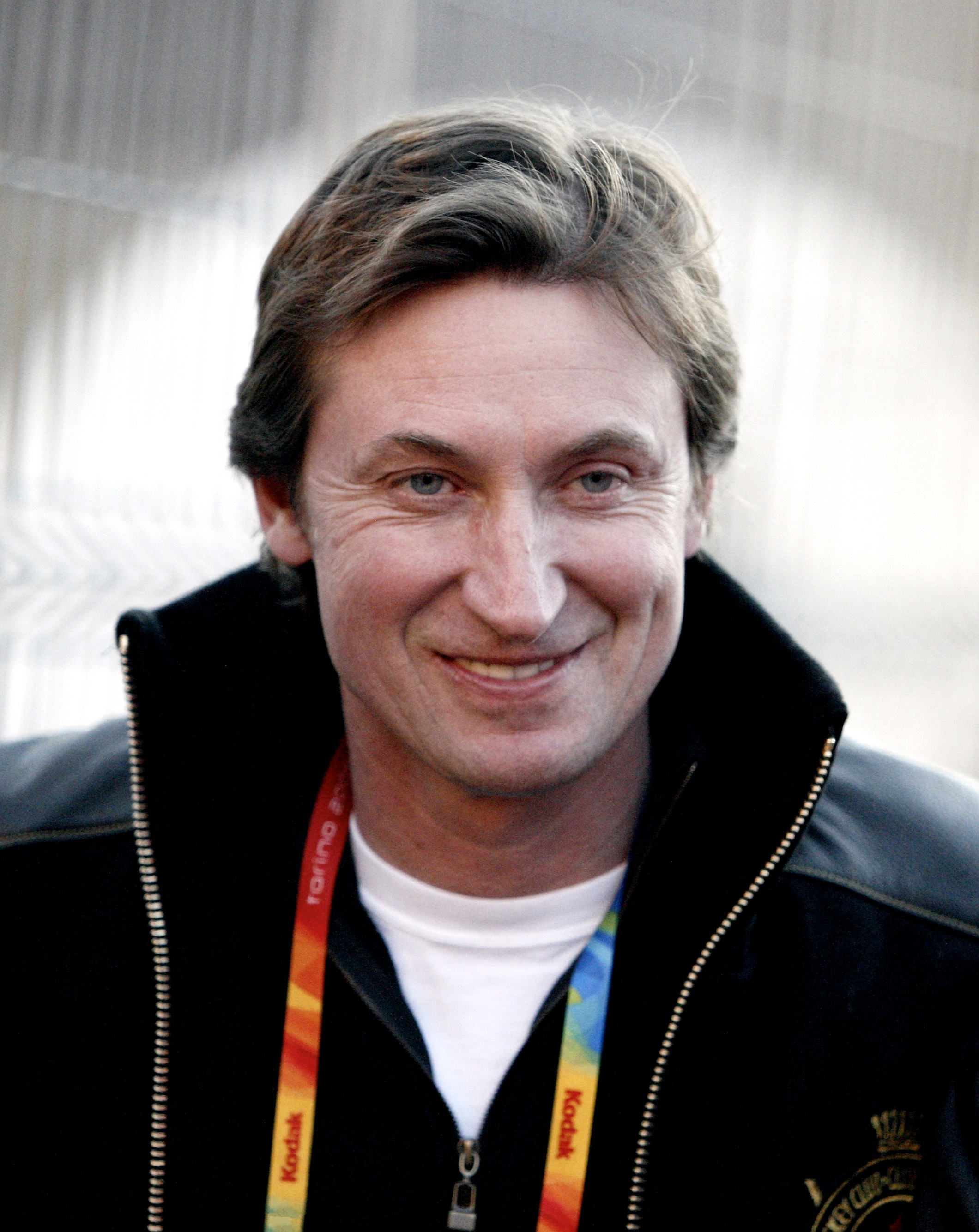
Wayne Gretzky

- January 2
  - Gabrielle Carteris, American actress, and trade union leader
  - Todd Haynes, American film director
- January 5 – Iris DeMent, American singer-songwriter and musician
- January 7 – Supriya Pathak, Indian actress
- January 8 – Calvin Smith, American athlete
- January 9 – Candi Milo, American actress
- January 11
  - Lars-Erik Torph, Swedish rally driver (d. 1989)
  - Karl Habsburg-Lothringen, Austrian politician, noble
- January 13 – Julia Louis-Dreyfus, American actress, producer and comedian
- January 14
  - Rob Hall, New Zealand mountaineer (d. 1996)
  - Mike Tramp, Danish rock singer (White Lion)
- January 17 – Maia Chiburdanidze, Georgian chess player
- January 18
  - Peter Beardsley, English footballer
  - Mark Messier, Canadian hockey player
- January 22
  - Daniel Johnston, American singer-songwriter, musician and artist (d. 2019)
  - Shigeru Nakahara, Japanese voice actor
- January 24 – Guido Buchwald, German footballer
- January 26 – Wayne Gretzky, Canadian hockey player
- January 28 – Arnaldur Indriðason, Icelandic writer
- January 29 – Petra Thümer, German swimmer

=== February ===
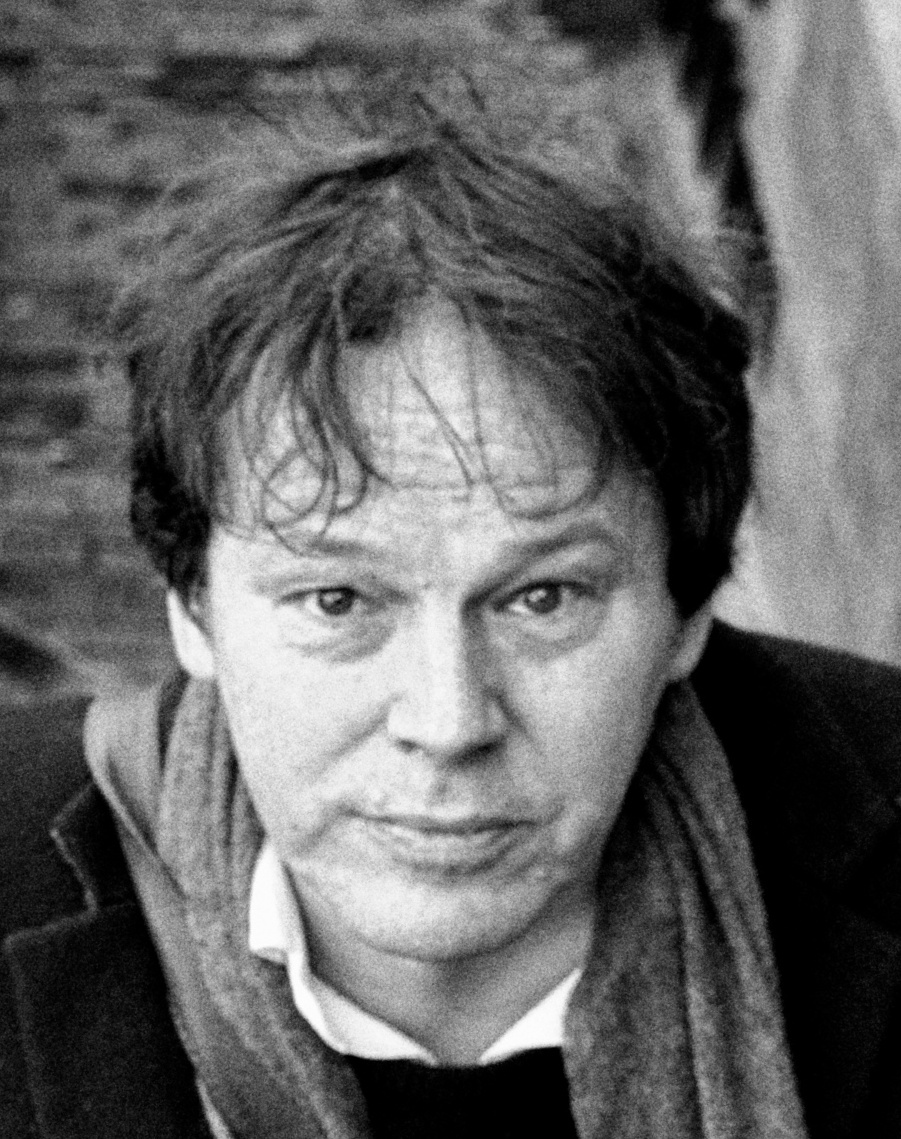
David Graeber

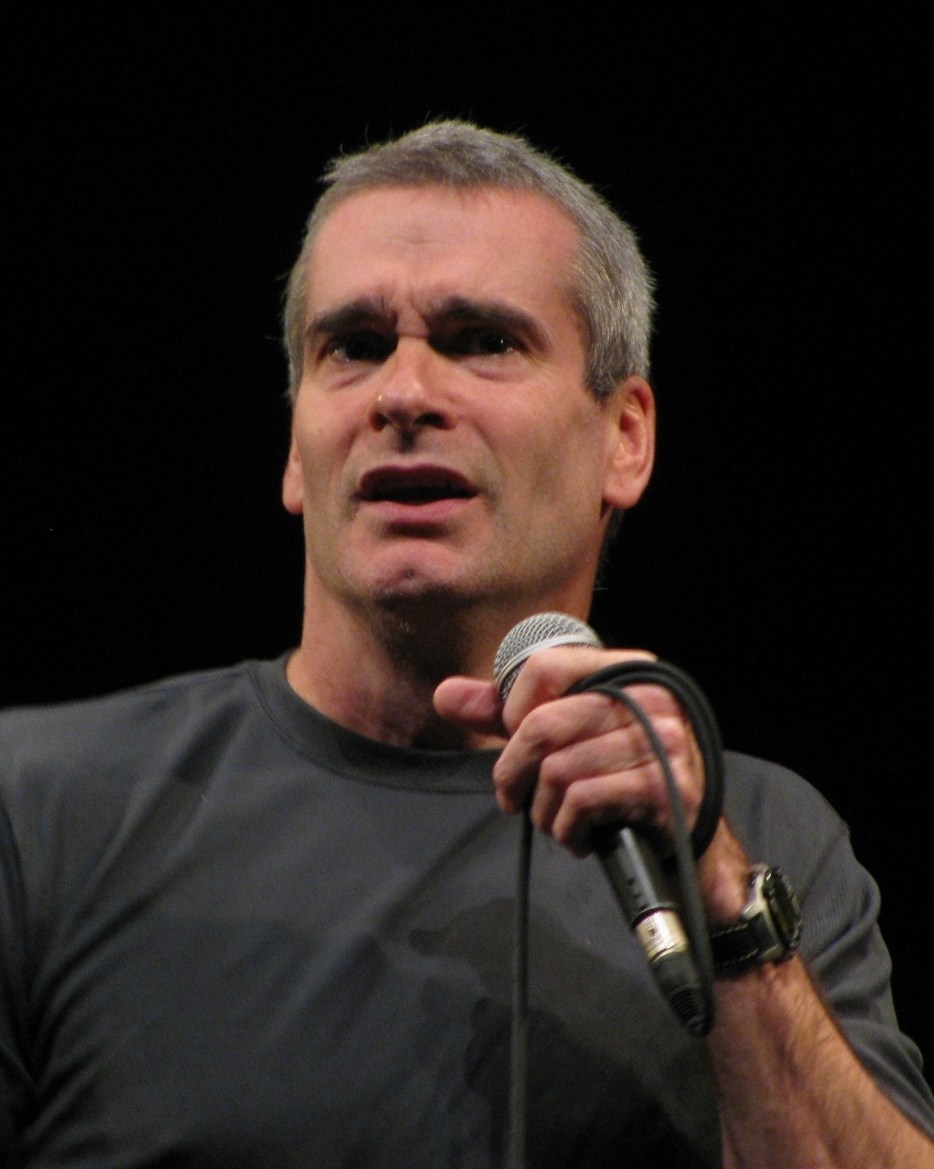
Henry Rollins

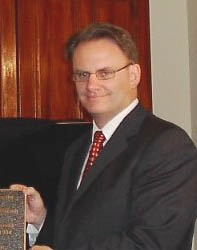
Mark Latham

- February 1 – Volker Fried, German field hockey player
- February 4 – Denis Cyr, Canadian-American ice hockey player and politician
- February 9 – Jussi Lampi, Finnish musician and actor
- February 11 – Mary Docter, American speed skater
- February 12 – David Graeber, American anthropologist, anarchist activist and author (d. 2020)
- February 13 – Henry Rollins, American musician and activist
- February 14 – Maria do Carmo Silveira, Prime Minister of São Tomé and Príncipe
- February 16 – Niko Nirvi, Finnish journalist
- February 17 – Andrey Korotayev, Russian anthropologist, economic historian and sociologist
- February 18 – Hironobu Kageyama, Japanese singer
- February 19 – Justin Fashanu, English footballer (d. 1998)
- February 20
  - Dwayne McDuffie, American writer of comics and television (d. 2011)
  - Phil Powers, American alpinist
- February 21
  - Christopher Atkins, American actor
  - Abhijit Banerjee, Indian-born economist, recipient of the Nobel Memorial Prize in Economic Sciences
  - Geoff Moore, American Christian musician
- February 22 – Akira Takasaki, Japanese guitarist
- February 27 – James Worthy, American basketball player and analyst
- February 28
  - Mark Latham, Australian politician
  - Richard Waugh, Canadian voice actor

=== March ===
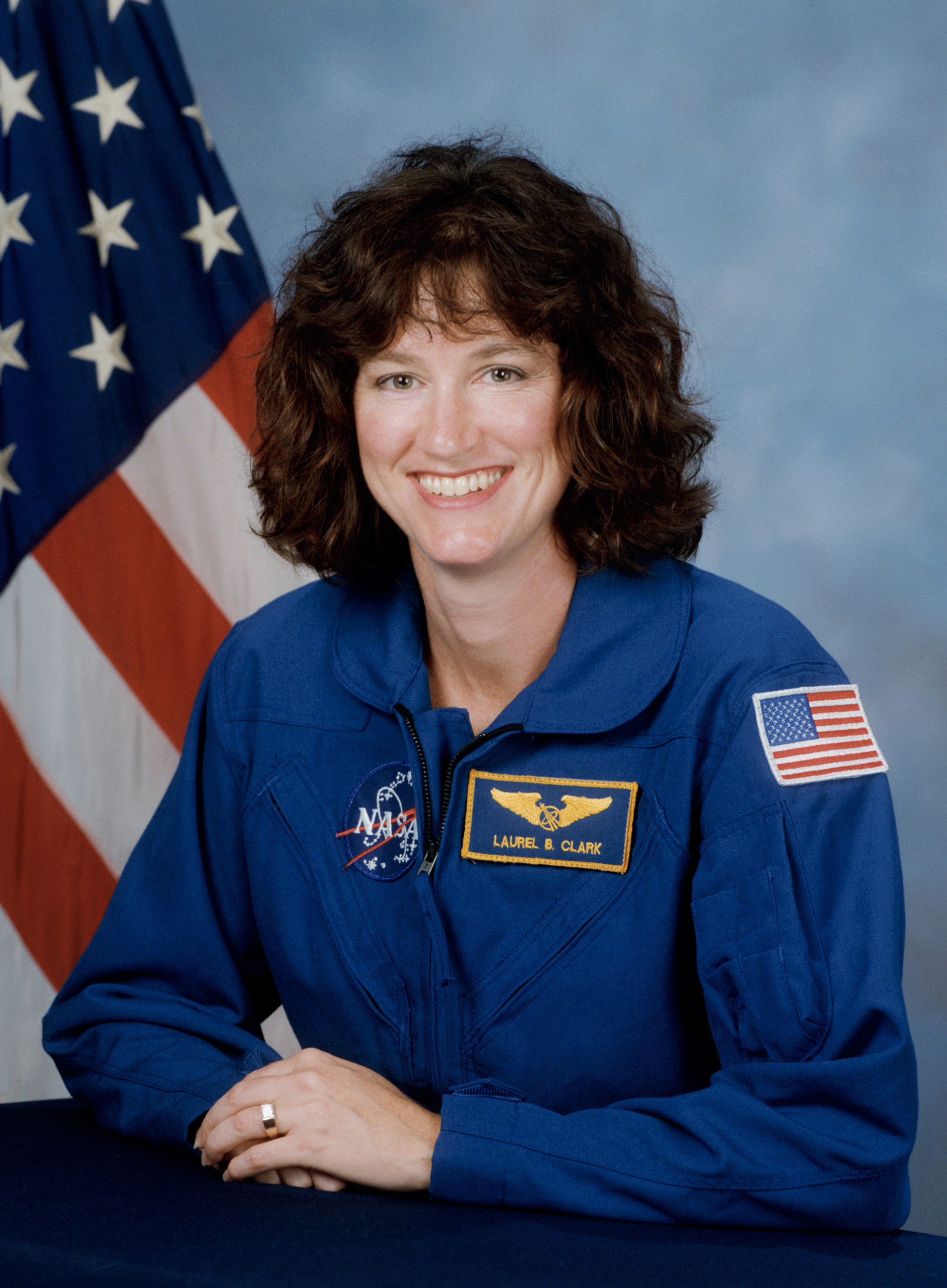
Laurel Clark

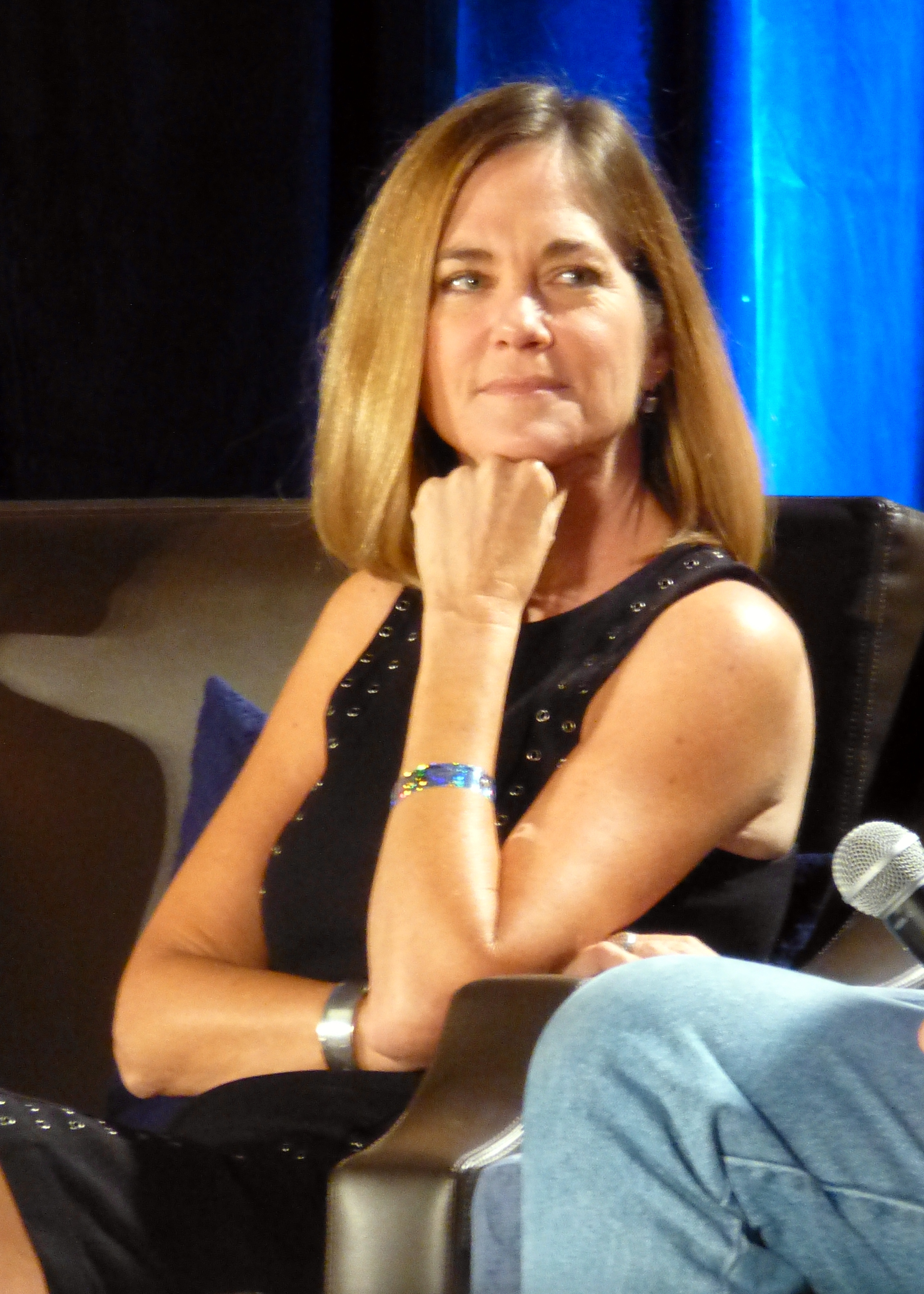
Kassie DePaiva

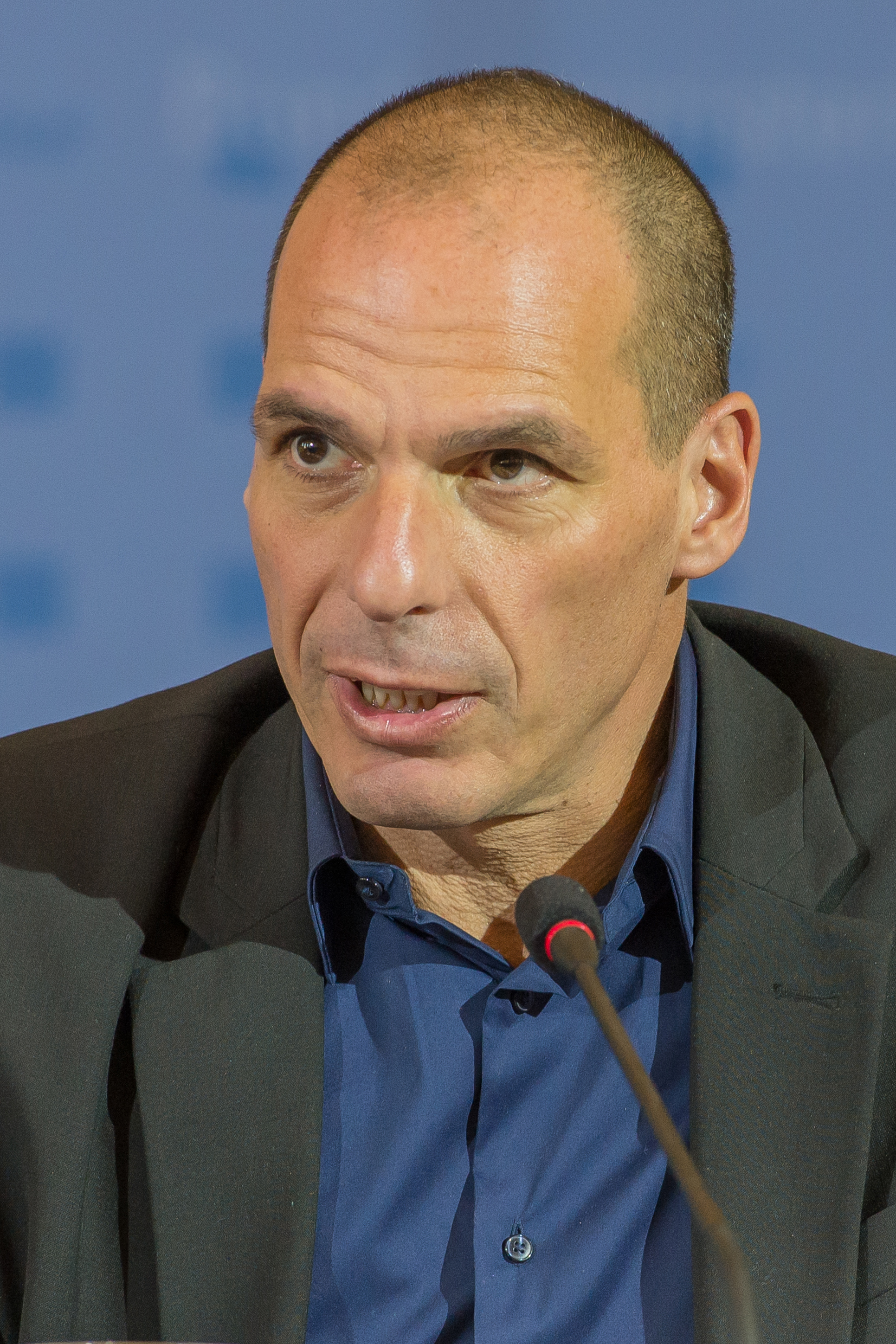
Yanis Varoufakis

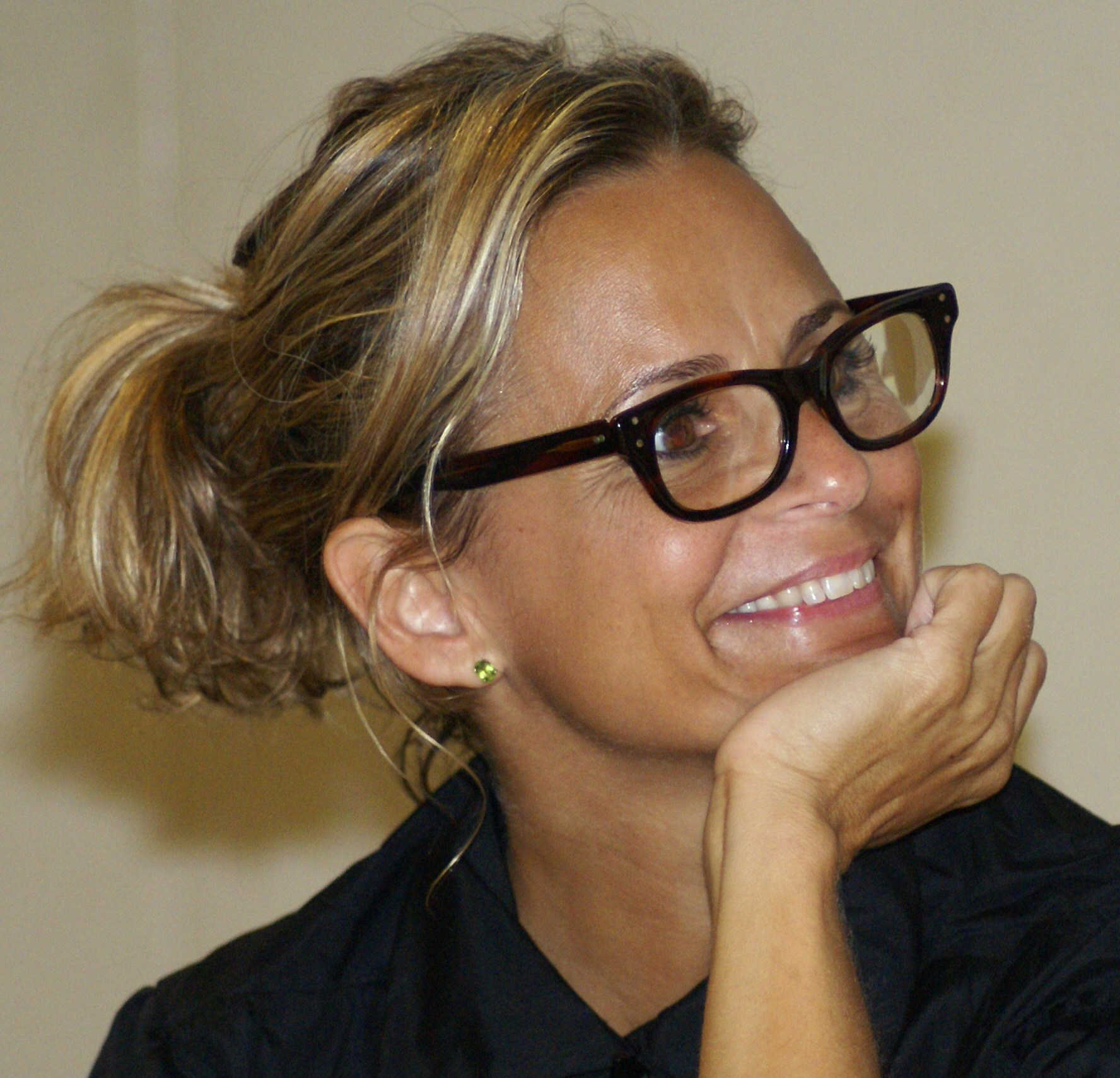
Amy Sedaris

- March 3
  - Milorad Mandić, Serbian actor (d. 2016)
  - Mary Page Keller, American actress
  - John Matteson, Pulitzer Prize-winning American biographer
- March 4
  - Ray Mancini, American boxer
  - Roger Wessels, South African golfer
- March 5 – Charles Poliquin, Canadian strength coach
- March 9
  - Mike Leach, American college football coach (d. 2022)
  - Rick Steiner, American professional wrestler
- March 10
  - Mike Bullard, American hockey player
  - Laurel Clark, American astronaut (d. 2003)
  - Mitch Gaylord, American gymnast
- March 11 – Elias Koteas, Canadian film and television actor
- March 15 – Moungi Bawendi, French-born Tunisian American chemist, recipient of Nobel Prize in Chemistry
- March 16
  - Brett Kenny, Australian rugby league player
  - Michiru Ōshima, Japanese composer
- March 17
  - Umayya Abu-Hanna, Palestine-born Finnish writer and politician
  - Alexander Bard, Swedish musician (Army of Lovers)
  - Sam Bowie, American basketball player
  - Dana Reeve, American actress, singer and activist (d. 2006)
  - Casey Siemaszko, American actor
- March 21
  - Kassie DePaiva, American actress
  - Lothar Matthäus, German footballer
- March 23
  - Norrie McCathie, Scottish footballer (d. 1996)
  - Ali Hewson, Irish activist and businesswoman
  - Helmi Johannes, Indonesian television newscaster
- March 24
  - Mitsuru Ogata, Japanese voice actor
  - Yanis Varoufakis, Greek economist, Finance Minister
- March 25 – Reggie Fils-Aimé, American businessman
- March 26 – William Hague, leader of the Conservative Party (UK), Foreign Secretary
- March 28 – Byron Scott, American basketball player and coach
- March 29
  - Amy Sedaris, American actress, comedian and writer
  - Gerardo Teissonniere, Puerto Rican pianist
- March 30 – Doug Wickenheiser, Canadian ice hockey player (d. 1999)
- March 31 – Gary Winick, American filmmaker (d. 2011)

=== April ===
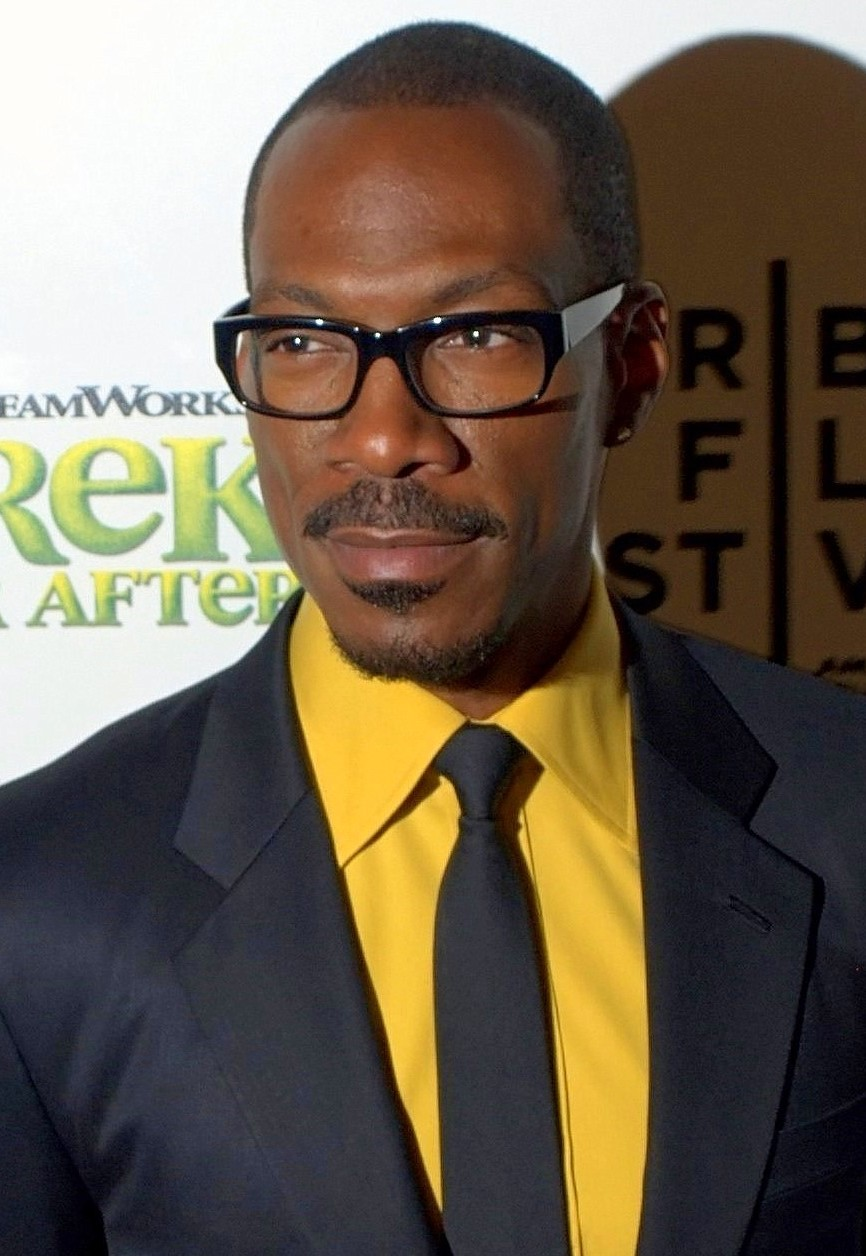
Eddie Murphy

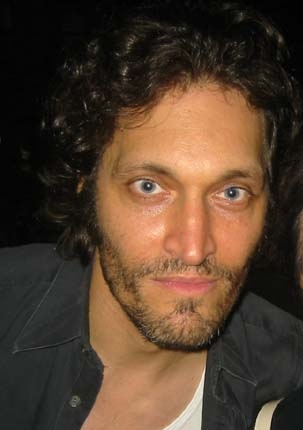
Vincent Gallo

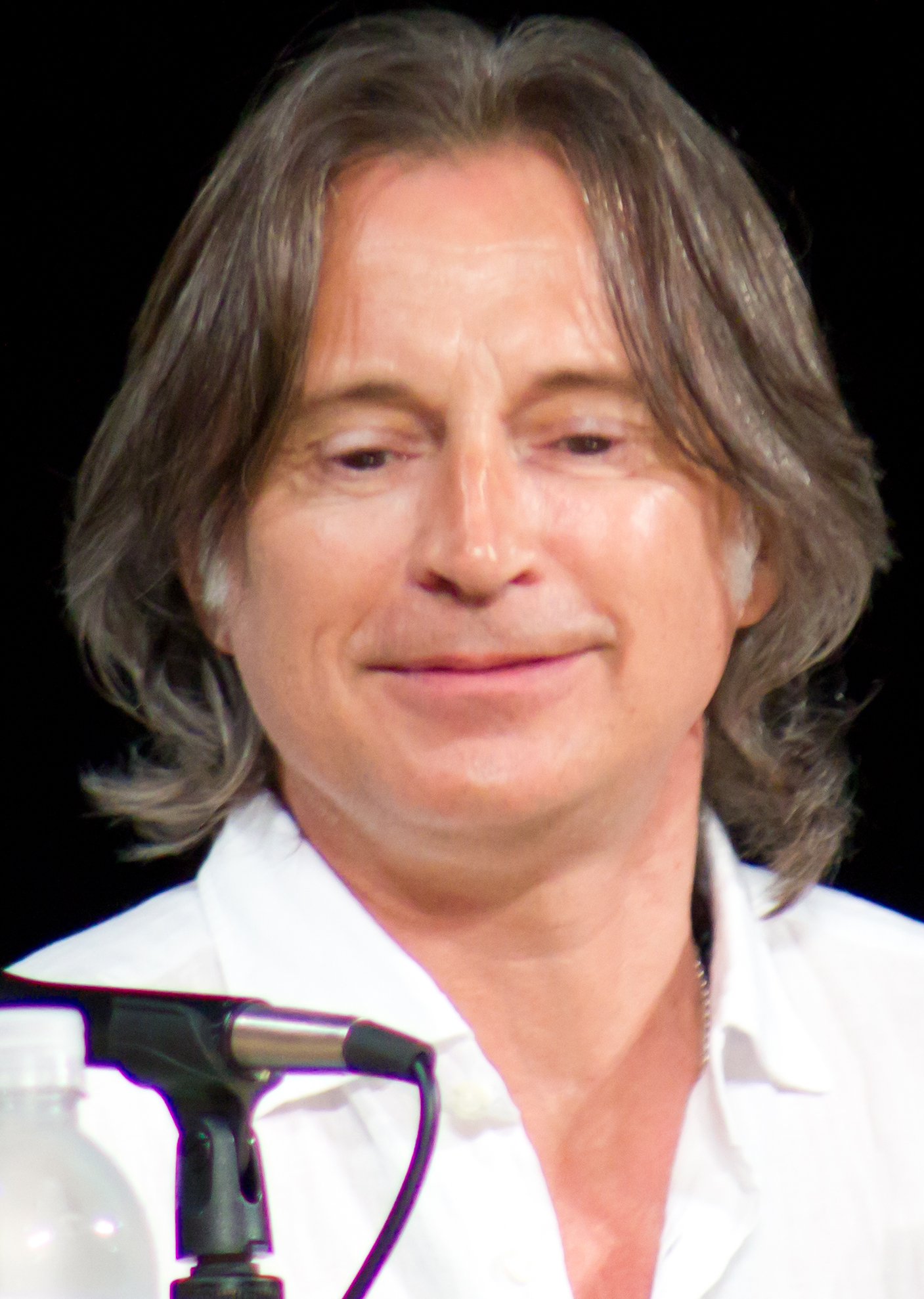
Robert Carlyle

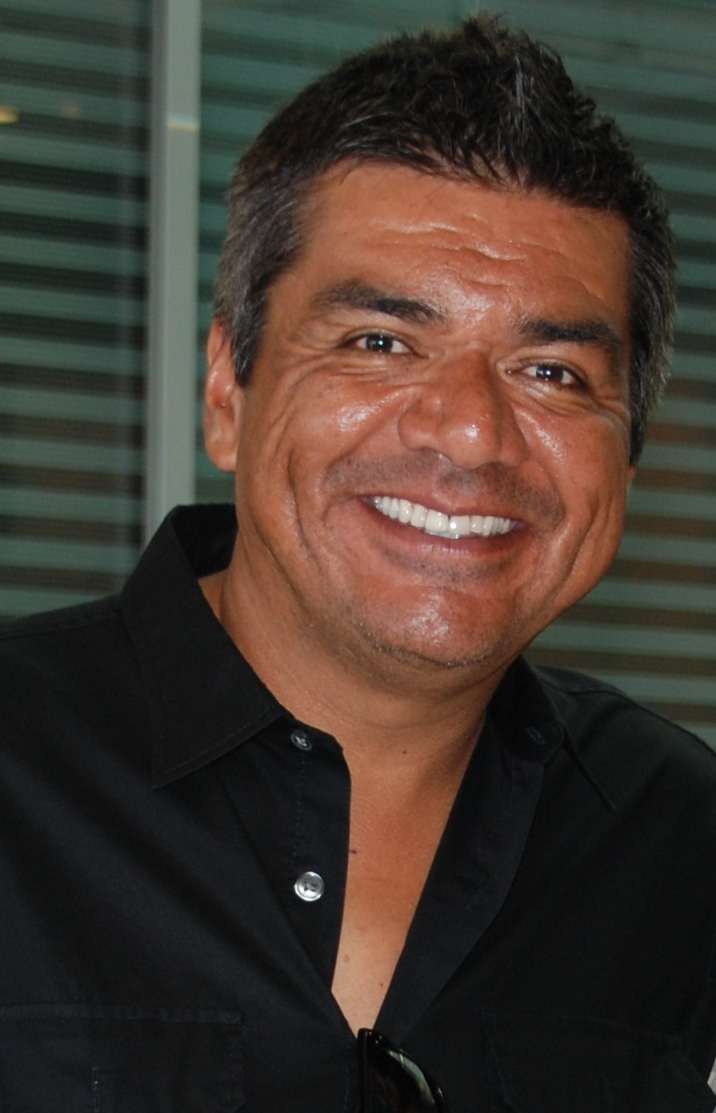
George Lopez

- April 1
  - Susan Boyle, Scottish singer
  - Kujira, Japanese voice actress
- April 2 – Christopher Meloni, American actor
- April 3 – Eddie Murphy, American actor and comedian
- April 5 – Lisa Zane, American actress
- April 9 – Mick Kennedy, Irish footballer (d. 2019)
- April 10 – Rudy Dhaenens, Belgian road bicycle racer (d. 1998)
- April 11 – Vincent Gallo, American actor
- April 12 – Lisa Gerrard, Australian musician
- April 14
  - Robert Carlyle, Scottish film and television actor
  - Humberto Martins, Brazilian actor
- April 18
  - Élisabeth Borne, French politician, Prime Minister of France
  - Jane Leeves, English actress
- April 20 – Konstantin Lavronenko, Russian actor
- April 22 – Alo Mattiisen, Estonian musician and composer (d. 1996)
- April 23
  - Dirk Bach, German actor and comedian (d. 2012)
  - George Lopez, American actor and comedian
- April 26
  - Mike Francis, Italian singer and composer (d. 2009)
  - Anthony Cumia, American radio personality
- April 27 – Moana Pozzi, Italian pornographic actress, television personality and politician (d. 1994)
- April 28 – Futoshi Matsunaga, Japanese serial killer
- April 29 – Fumihiko Tachiki, Japanese voice actor
- April 30 – Isiah Thomas, African-American basketball player, coach and team owner

=== May ===
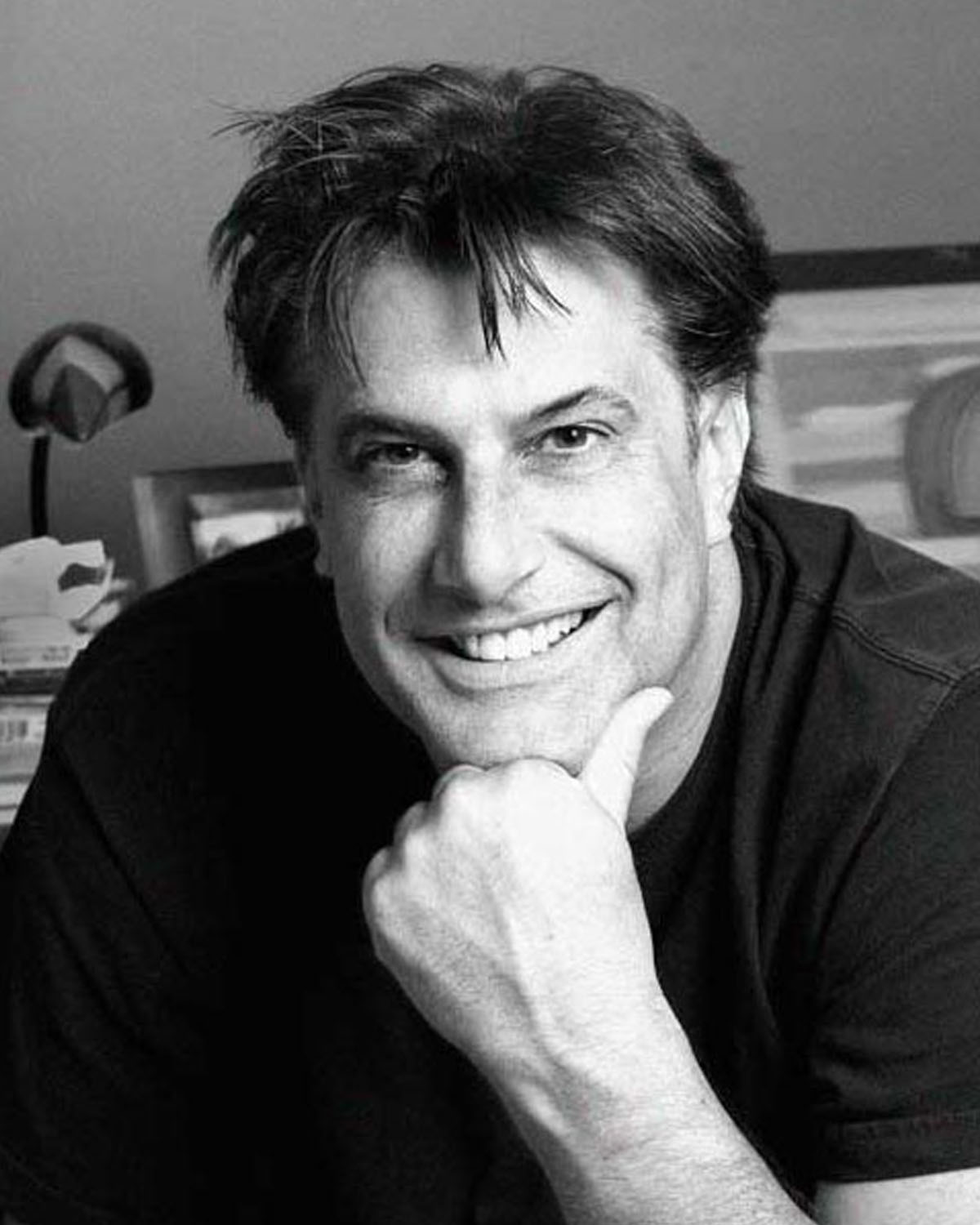
Joe Murray

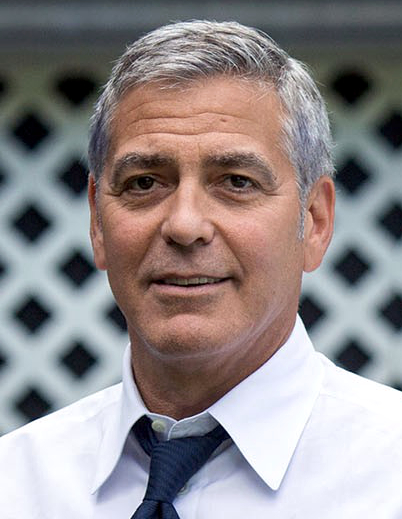
George Clooney

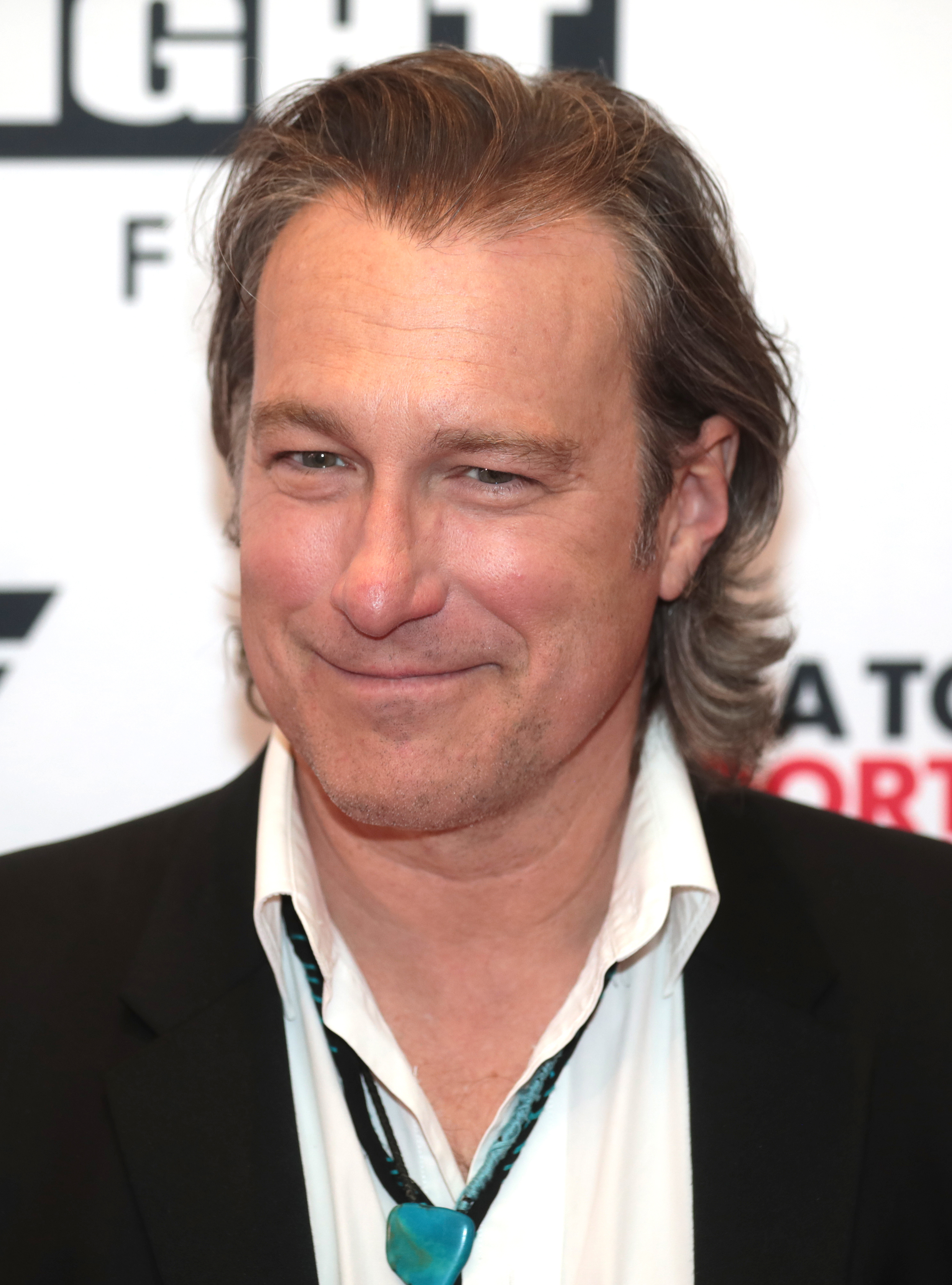
John Corbett

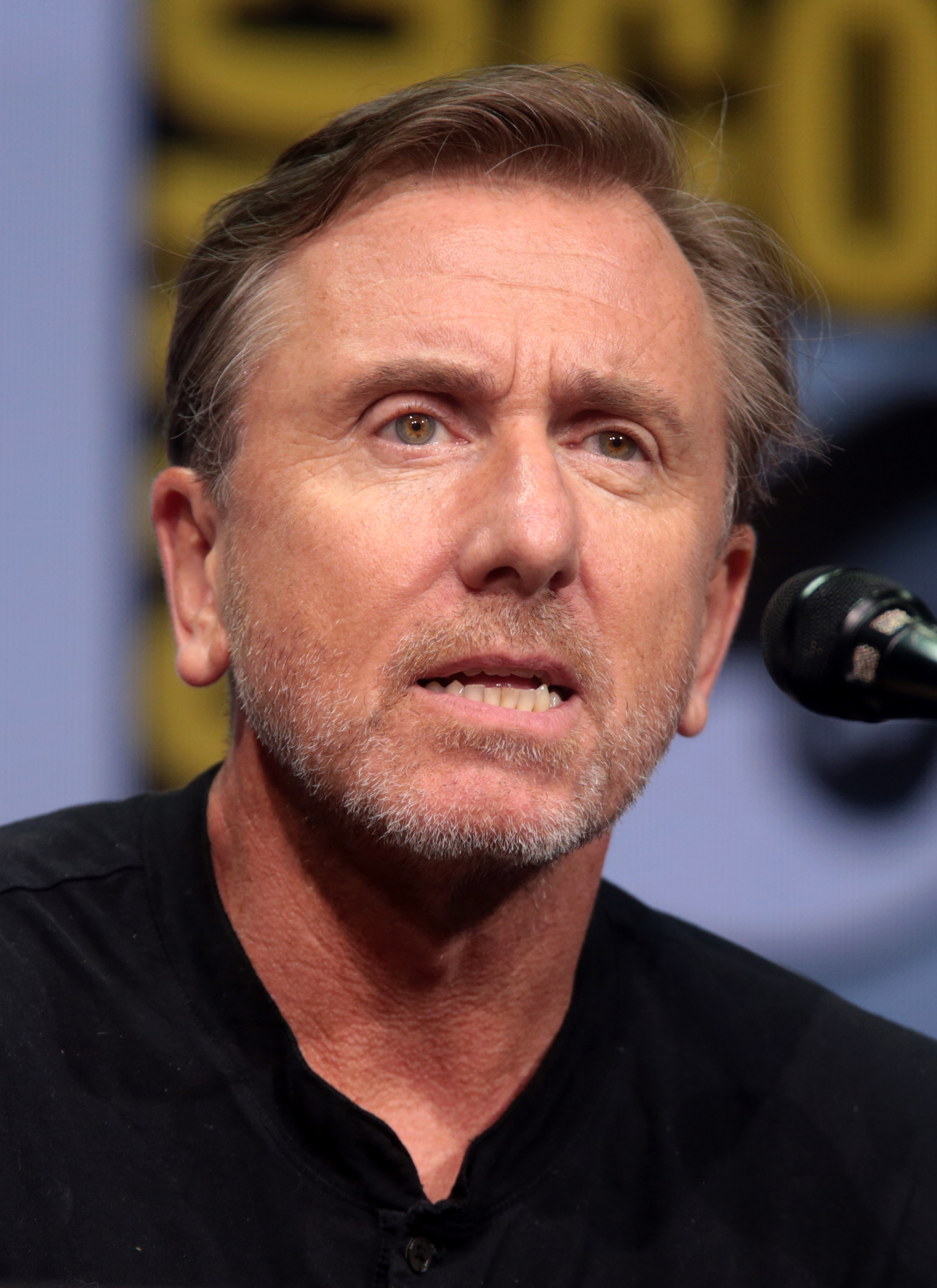
Tim Roth

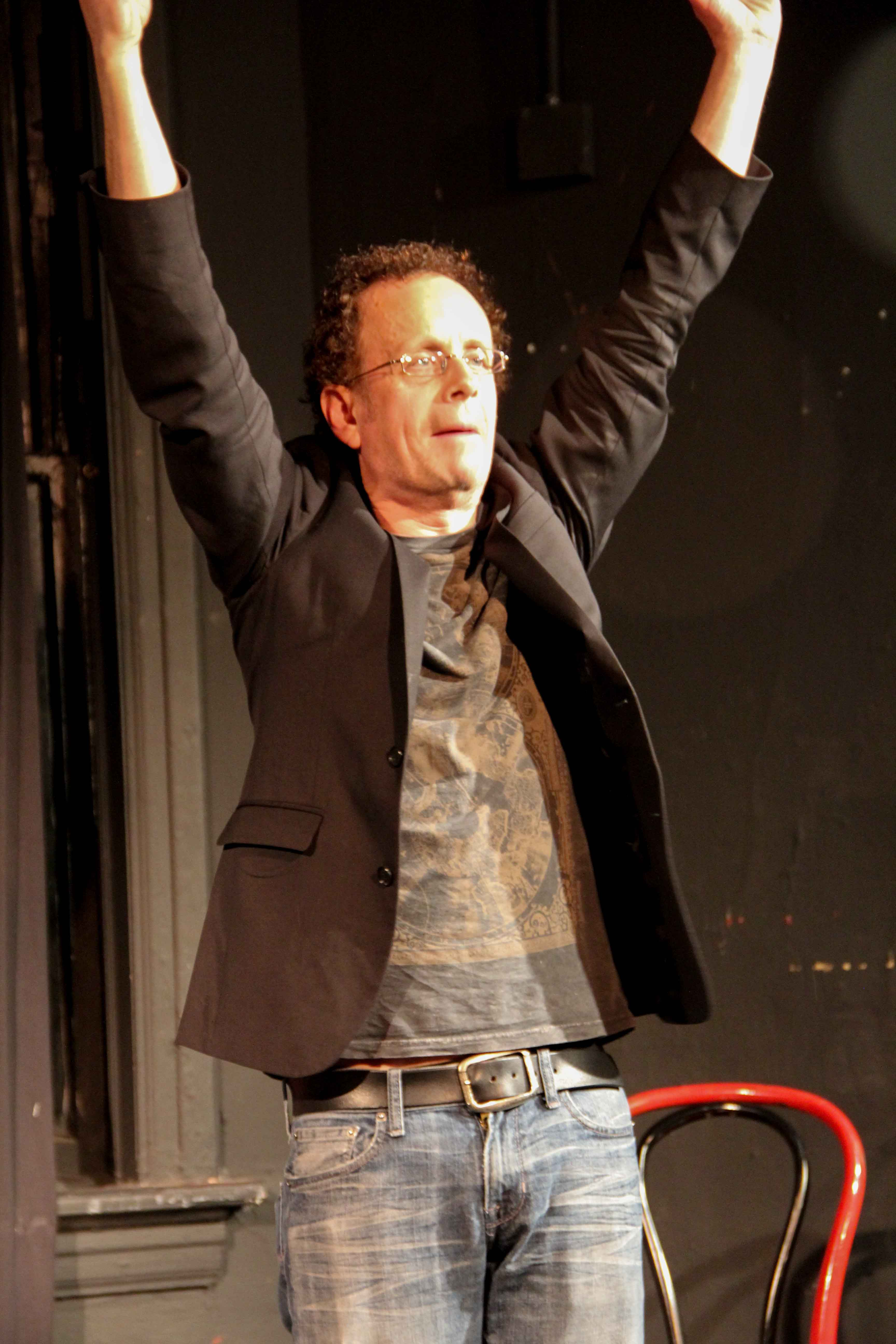
Kevin McDonald

- May 4 – Mary Elizabeth McDonough, American actress, producer, director and author
- May 5 – Hiroshi Hase, Japanese professional wrestler
- May 6
  - George Clooney, American actor
  - Frans Timmermans, Dutch politician and European Commissioner
- May 9 – John Corbett, American actor and country music singer
- May 13 – Dennis Rodman, American basketball player and actor
- May 14
  - Urban Priol, German Kabarett artist and comedian
  - Tim Roth, English actor and director
- May 16
  - Solveig Dommartin, French actress (d. 2007)
  - Kevin McDonald, Canadian actor, voice actor and comedian
  - Charles Wright, American professional wrestler
- May 17
  - Enya, Irish musician
  - Amadou Ba, former Prime Minister of Senegal
- May 20 – Clive Allen, British footballer
- May 21 – Brent Briscoe, American actor and screenwriter (d. 2017)
- May 22
  - Mike Breen, American sports announcer
  - Ann Cusack, American actress
- May 23
  - Mitar Subotić, Serbian musician and composer (d. 1999)
  - Karen Duffy, American actress
- May 24 – Ilaria Alpi, Italian journalist (d. 1994)
- May 27 – Peri Gilpin, American actress
- May 28 – Roland Gift, British singer and musician (Fine Young Cannibals)
- May 29 – Melissa Etheridge, American musician
- May 30
  - Ralph Carter, American actor
  - Harry Enfield, English comedian, actor, writer and director
- May 31
  - Ray Cote, Canadian ice hockey player
  - Lea Thompson, American actress

=== June ===
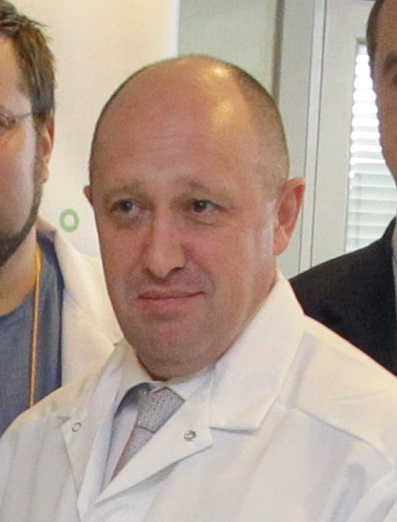
Yevgeny Prigozhin

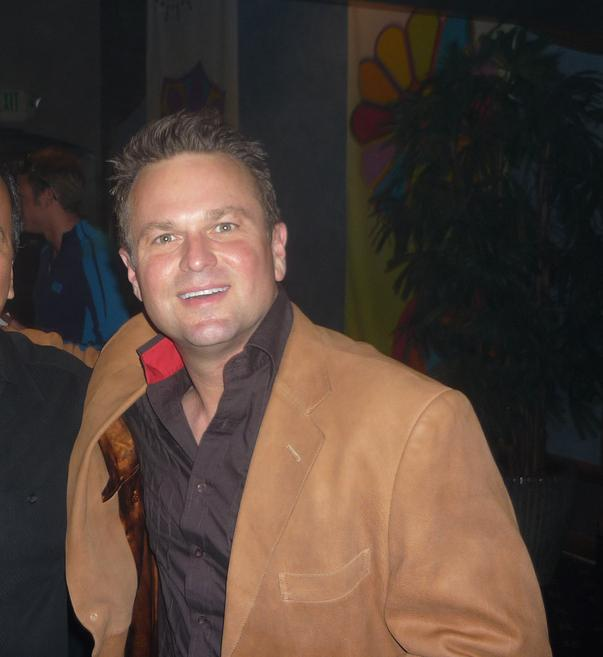
Sam Harris

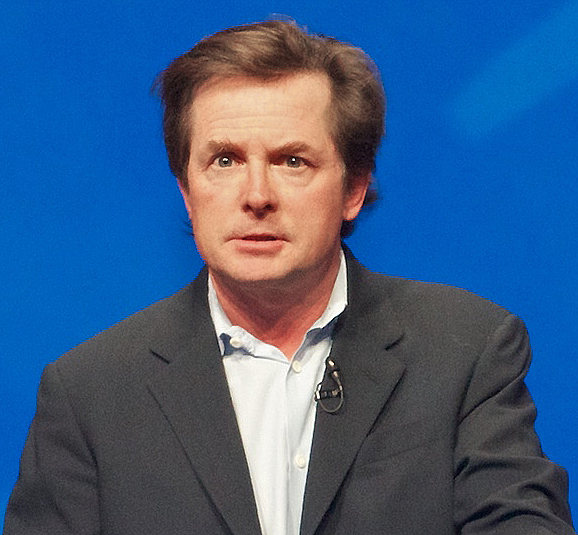
Michael J. Fox

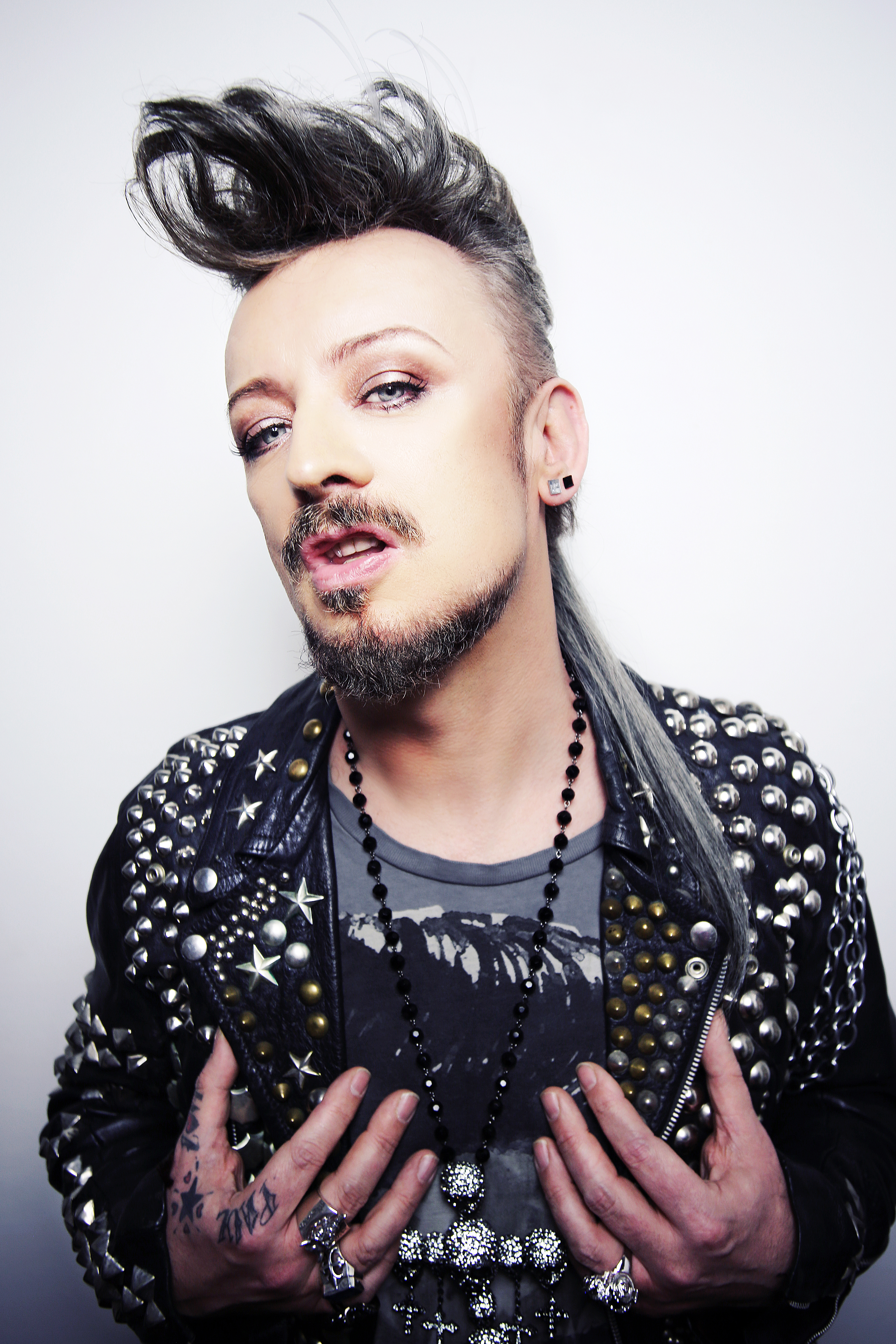
Boy George

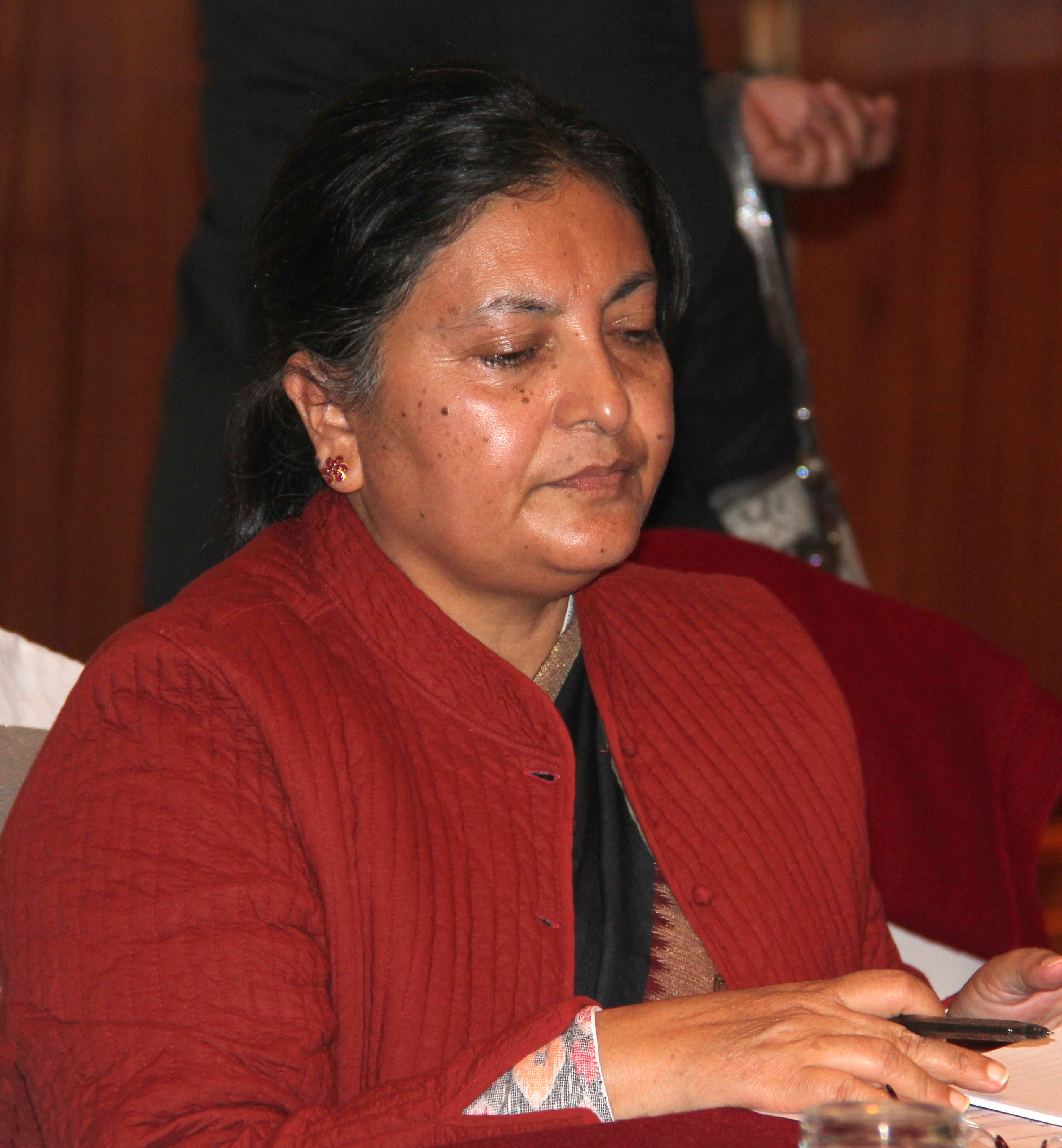
Bidya Devi Bhandari

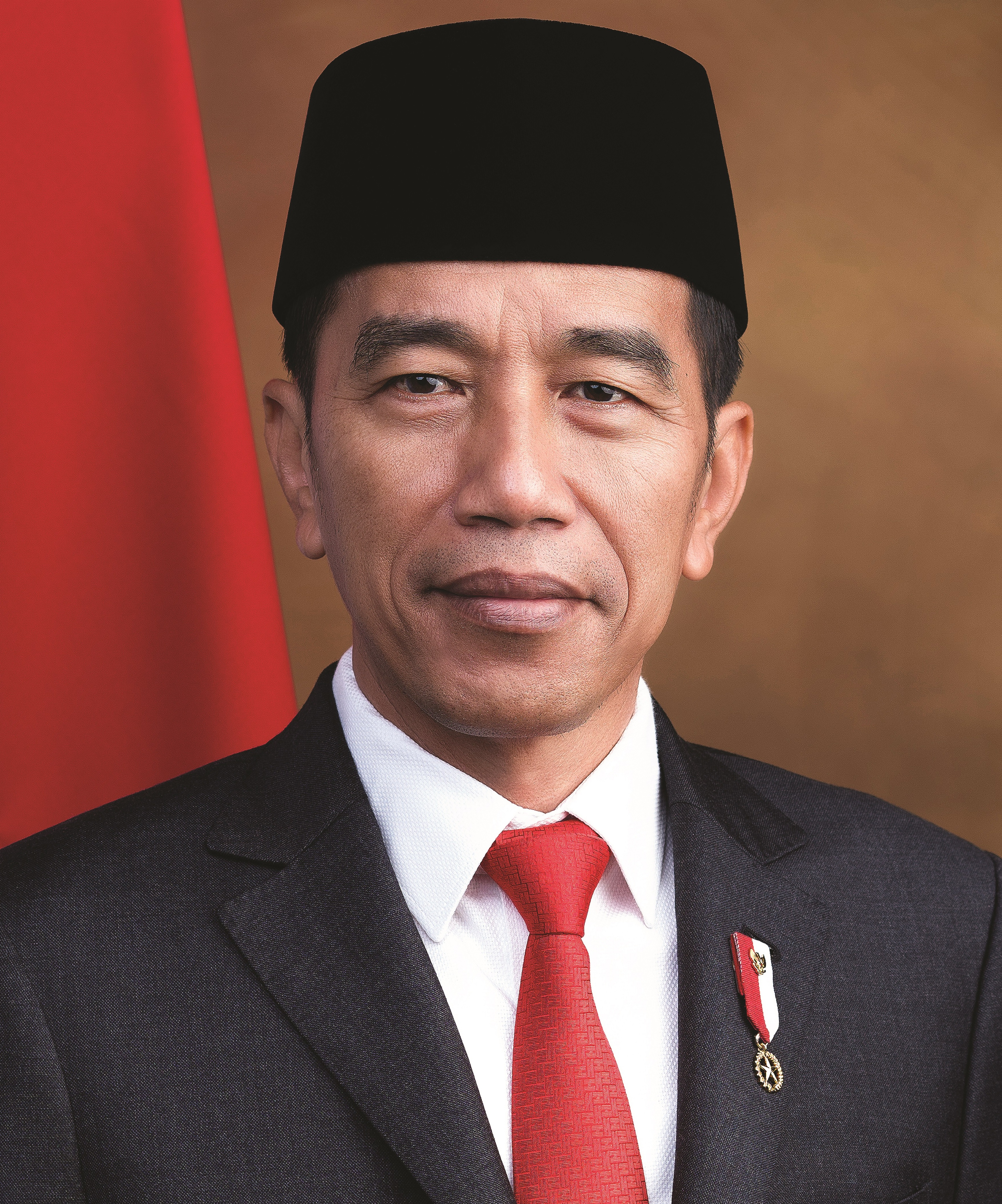
Joko Widodo

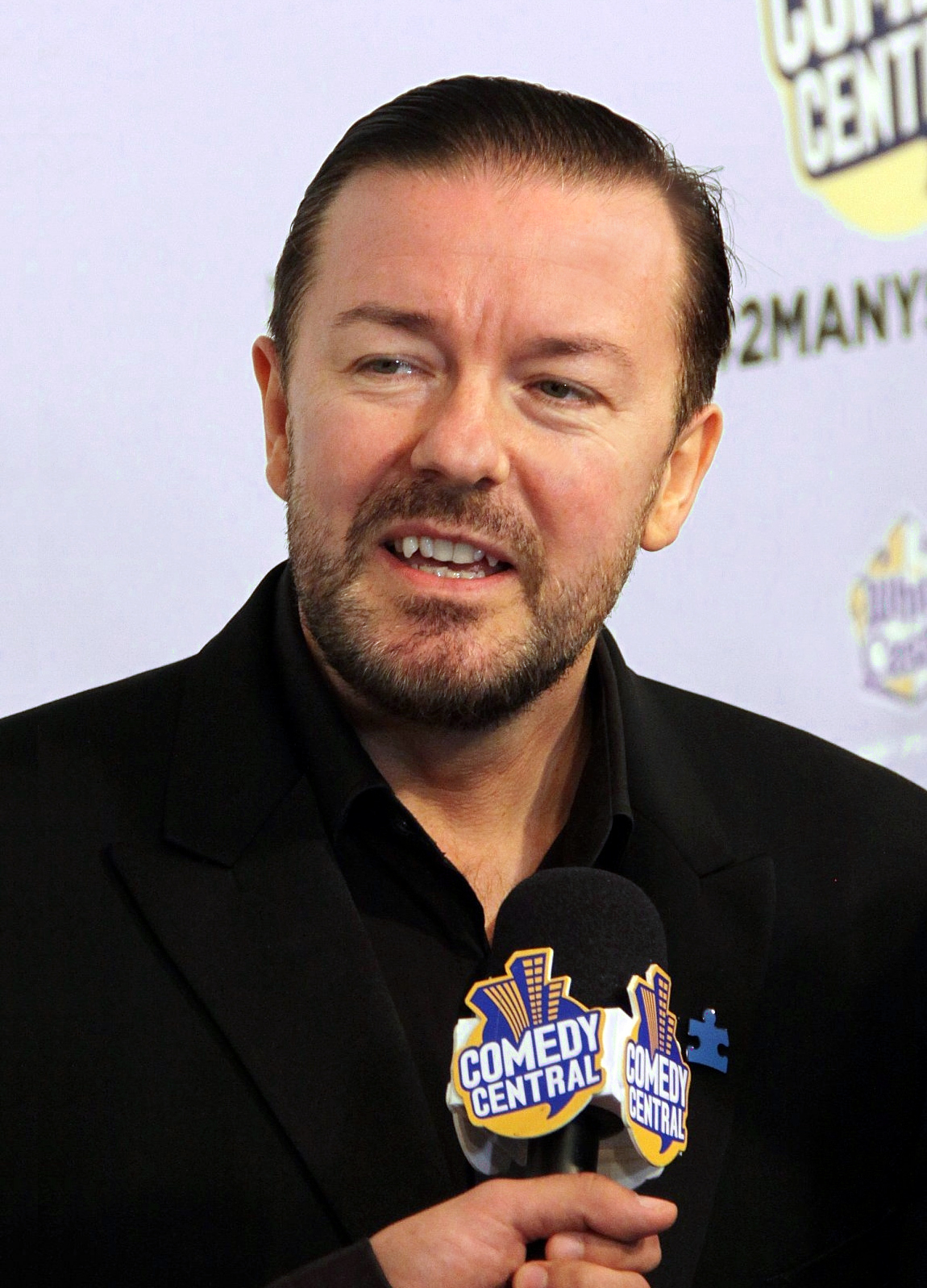
Ricky Gervais

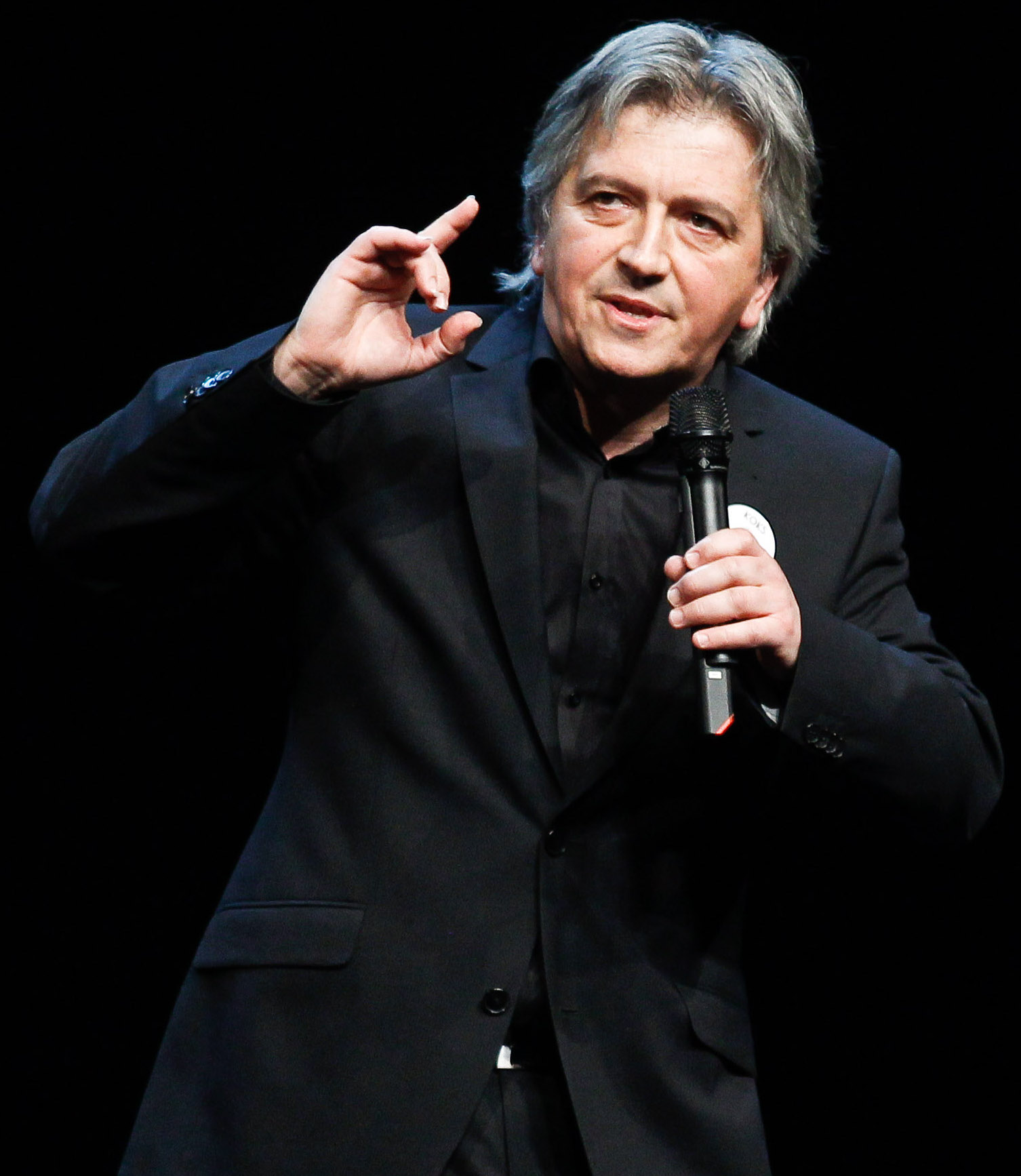
Iztok Mlakar

- June 1
  - Paul Coffey, Canadian hockey player
  - Dilipkumar Viraji Thakor, Indian politician
  - Yevgeny Prigozhin, Russian oligarch, mercenary chief and restaurateur (d. 2023)
- June 3 – Lawrence Lessig, American academic and political activist
- June 4 – El DeBarge, American urban singer; was member of American urban group DeBarge
- June 5 – Mary Kay Bergman, American voice actress (d. 1999)
- June 6 – Tom Araya, Chilean-born rock musician (Slayer)
- June 8 – Katy Garbi, Greek singer
- June 9
  - Michael J. Fox, Canadian-American actor, producer and author
  - Aaron Sorkin, American screenwriter, producer and playwright
- June 10
  - Kim and Kelley Deal, American musicians
  - Maxi Priest, born Max Elliott, British reggae singer
- June 14 – Boy George, born George O'Dowd, British singer-songwriter and music producer
- June 15 – Dave McAuley, Northern Irish boxer
- June 17 – Kōichi Yamadera, Japanese voice actor
- June 18
  - Sakahoko Nobushige, Japanese sumo wrestler (d. 2019)
  - Andrés Galarraga, Venezuelan baseball player
  - Alison Moyet, English singer-songwriter
- June 19 – Bidhya Devi Bhandari, 2nd President of Nepal
- June 20
  - Karin Kania, German speed skater
  - Joko Widodo, 7th President of Indonesia
- June 21 – Iztok Mlakar, Slovenian singer-songwriter and actor
- June 23 – Zoran Janjetov, Serbian comic artist
- June 24
  - Raja Yong Sofia, Malaysian aristocrat
  - Lisa Bevill, American Christian musician
  - Curt Smith, British singer and keyboardist
- June 25
  - Jamil Khir Baharom, Malaysian politician and former military officer
  - Ricky Gervais, English comedian, actor, writer, director, and singer in Seona Dancing
- June 26 – Greg LeMond, American cyclist
- June 27 – Meera Syal, British-Indian comedian and actress
- June 28
  - Jeff Malone, American basketball player
  - Eliezer Melamed, Israeli rabbi
- June 29
  - Greg Hetson, American rock guitarist
  - Sharon Lawrence, American actress, singer and dancer

=== July ===
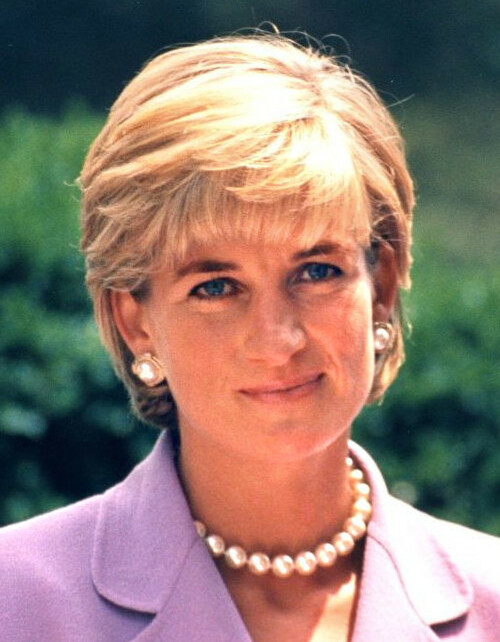
Diana, Princess of Wales

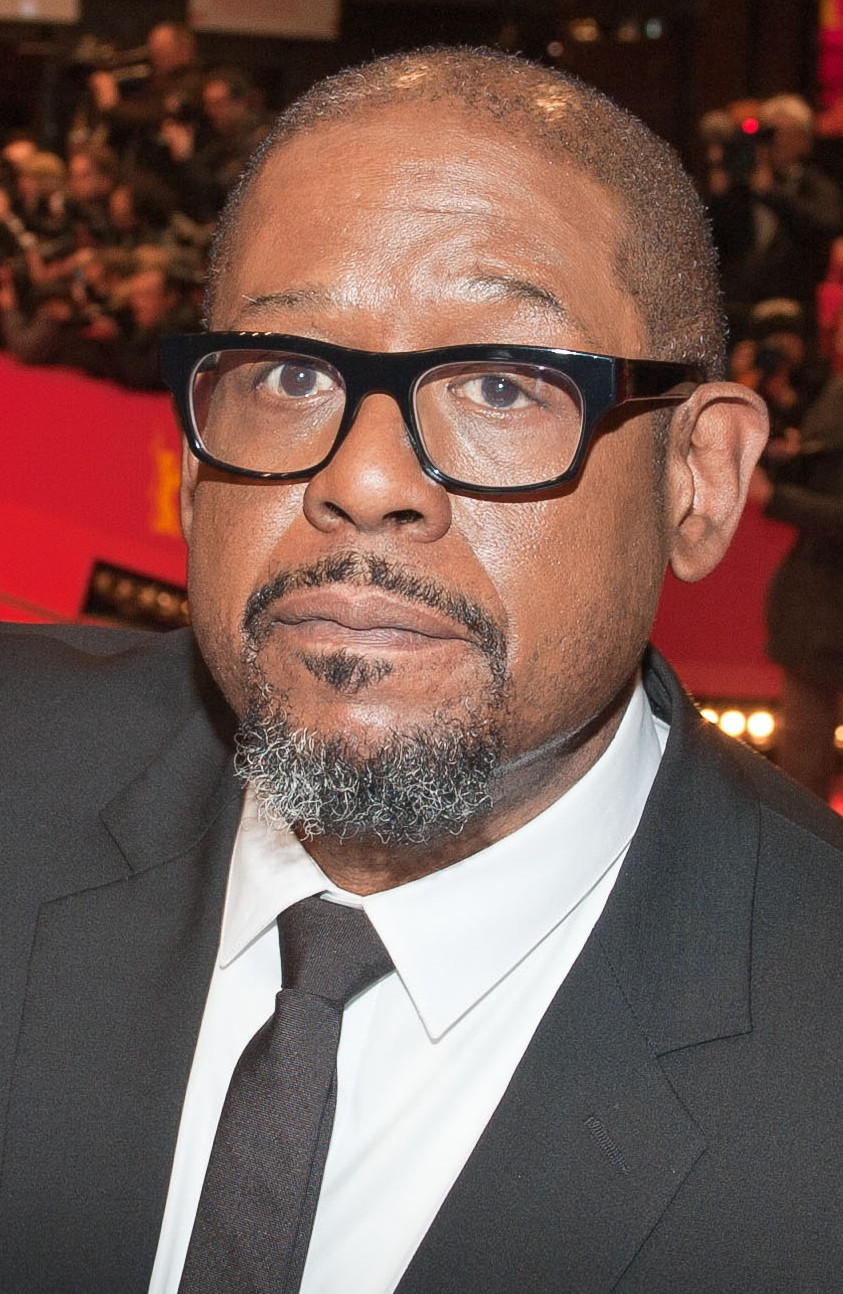
Forest Whitaker

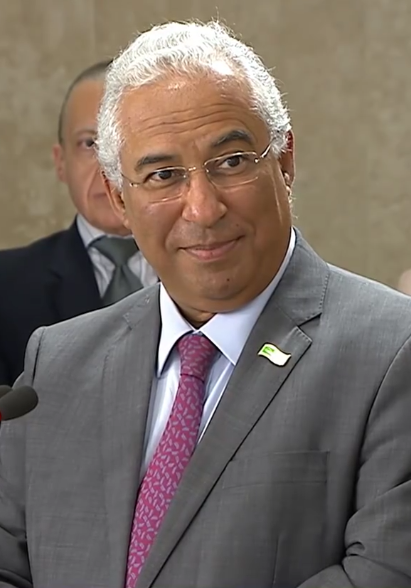
António Costa

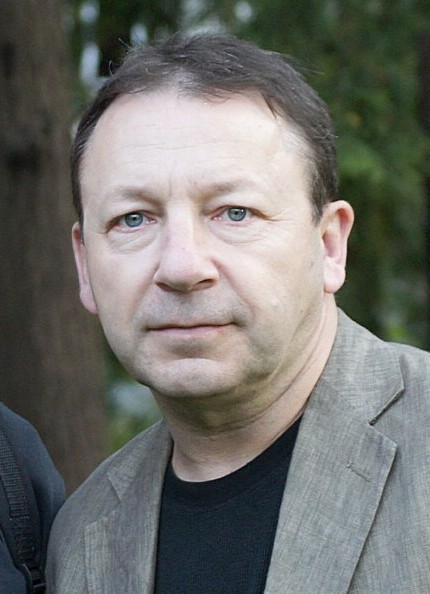
Zbigniew Zamachowski

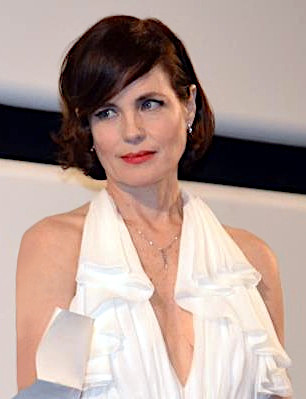
Elizabeth McGovern

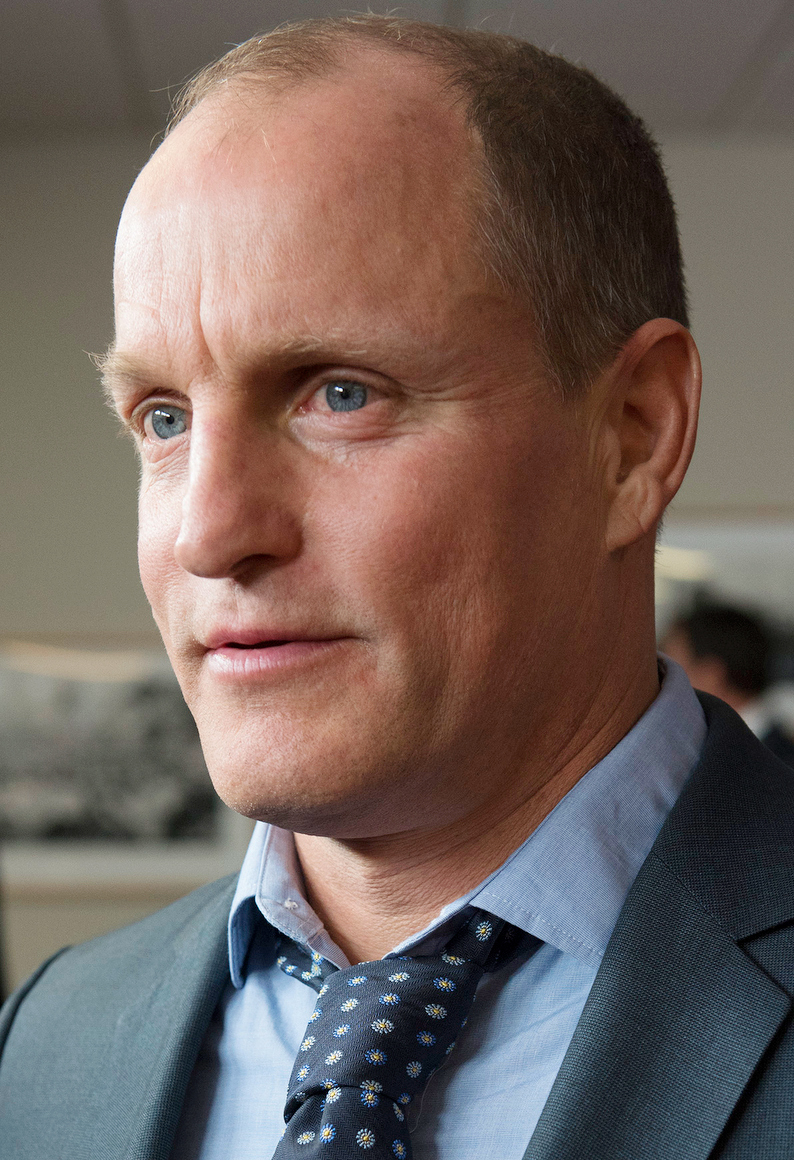
Woody Harrelson

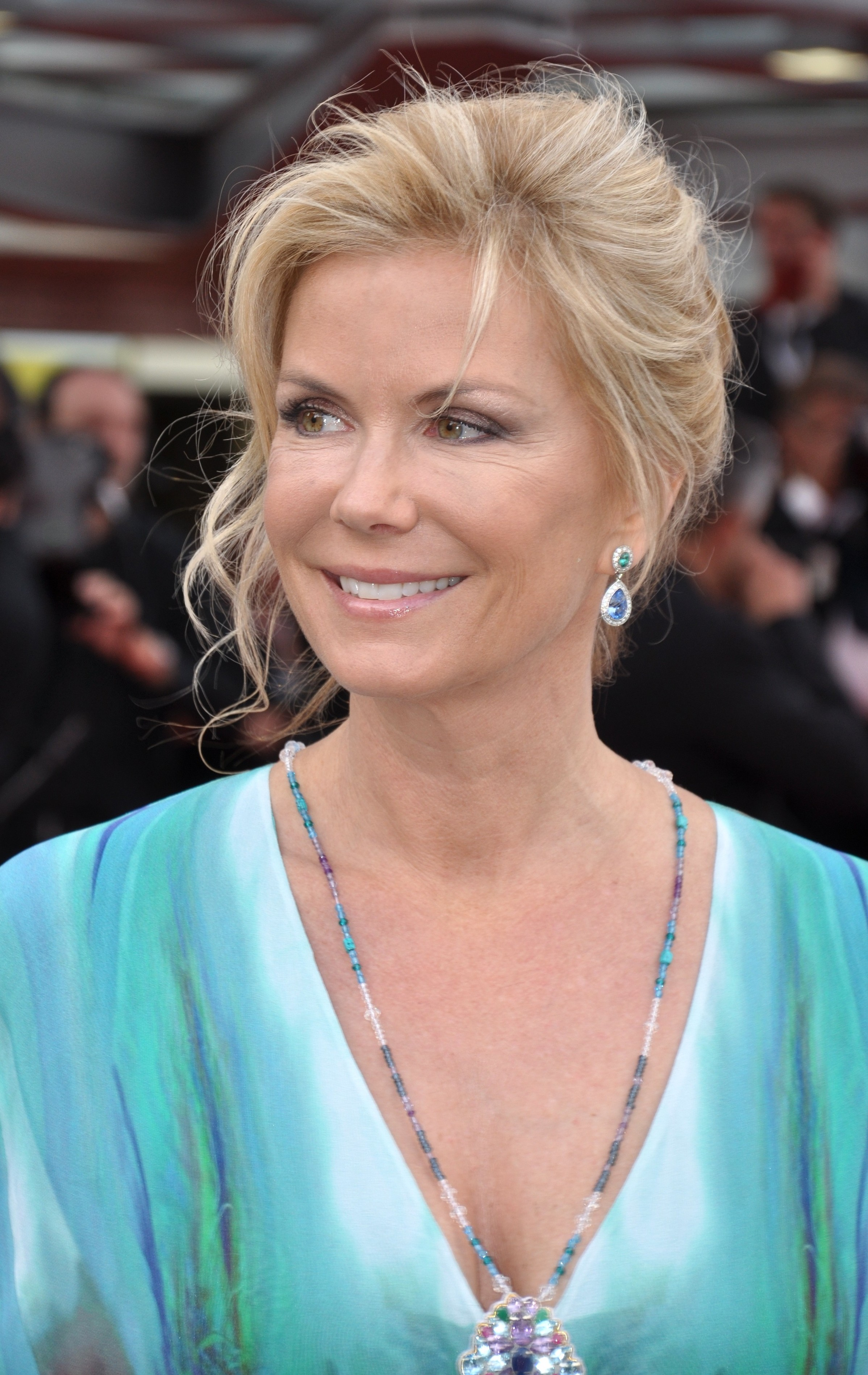
Katherine Kelly Lang

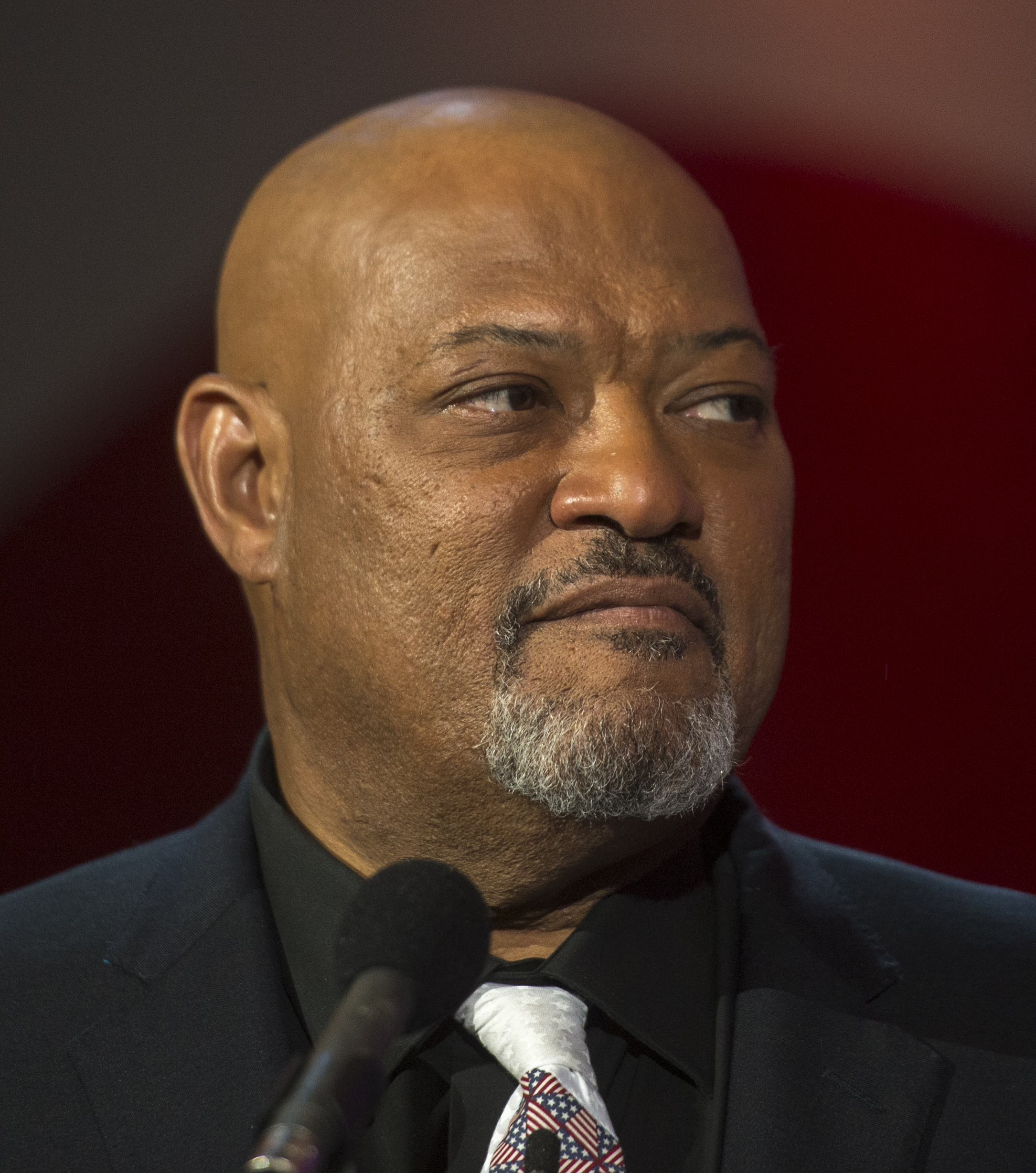
Laurence Fishburne

- July 1
  - Diana, Princess of Wales, born The Hon. Diana Spencer, English princess consort as first wife of Charles, Prince of Wales (d. 1997)
  - Carl Lewis, American athlete
  - Fredy Schmidtke, German track cyclist (d. 2017)
  - Michelle Wright, Canadian country music artist
- July 2 – Samy Naceri, French actor
- July 3 – Mosi Alli, Tanzanian sprinter
- July 6 – Richard Mofe-Damijo, Nigerian actor
- July 8 – Toby Keith, American country music singer (d. 2024)
- July 10
  - Jacky Cheung, Hong Kong singer and actor
  - Lee Heung-sil, South Korean footballer
- July 11
  - João Donizeti Silvestre, Brazilian businessman, historian, biologist and politician
  - Ophir Pines-Paz, Israeli politician
- July 13 – Stelios Manolas, Greek footballer
- July 15 – Forest Whitaker, African-American actor and film director
- July 17
  - António Costa, Portuguese politician, 119th Prime Minister (2015–present)
  - Guru, American rapper (Gang Starr) (d. 2010)
  - Zbigniew Zamachowski, Polish actor
- July 18 – Elizabeth McGovern, American actress and musician
- July 19
  - Noriyuki Abe, Japanese anime director
  - Maria Filatova, Soviet gymnast
  - Lisa Lampanelli, American stand-up comedian, actress and insult comic
- July 21 – Mokgweetsi Masisi, 5th President of Botswana
- July 22
  - Porfirije, born Prvoslav Perić, Serbian Patriarch
  - Irina Rozanova, Russian actress
- July 23
  - Martin Gore, British musician and songwriter
  - Woody Harrelson, American actor and comedian
- July 24 – Joseph Kony, Ugandan insurgent, leader of the Lord's Resistance Army
- July 25
  - Illeana Douglas, American actress
  - Katherine Kelly Lang, American actress
  - Hugo Teufel III, American lawyer and government official, 2nd Chief Privacy Officer, Department of Homeland Security
- July 26
  - Raquel Dodge, General Prosecutor of Brazil
  - Keiko Matsui, Japanese pianist and composer
  - Dimitris Saravakos, Greek footballer
- July 27 – Erez Tal, Israeli television host
- July 28 – Aleksandr Kurlovich, Soviet-Belarusian Olympic weightlifter (d. 2018)
- July 30 – Laurence Fishburne, African-American actor and film director

=== August ===
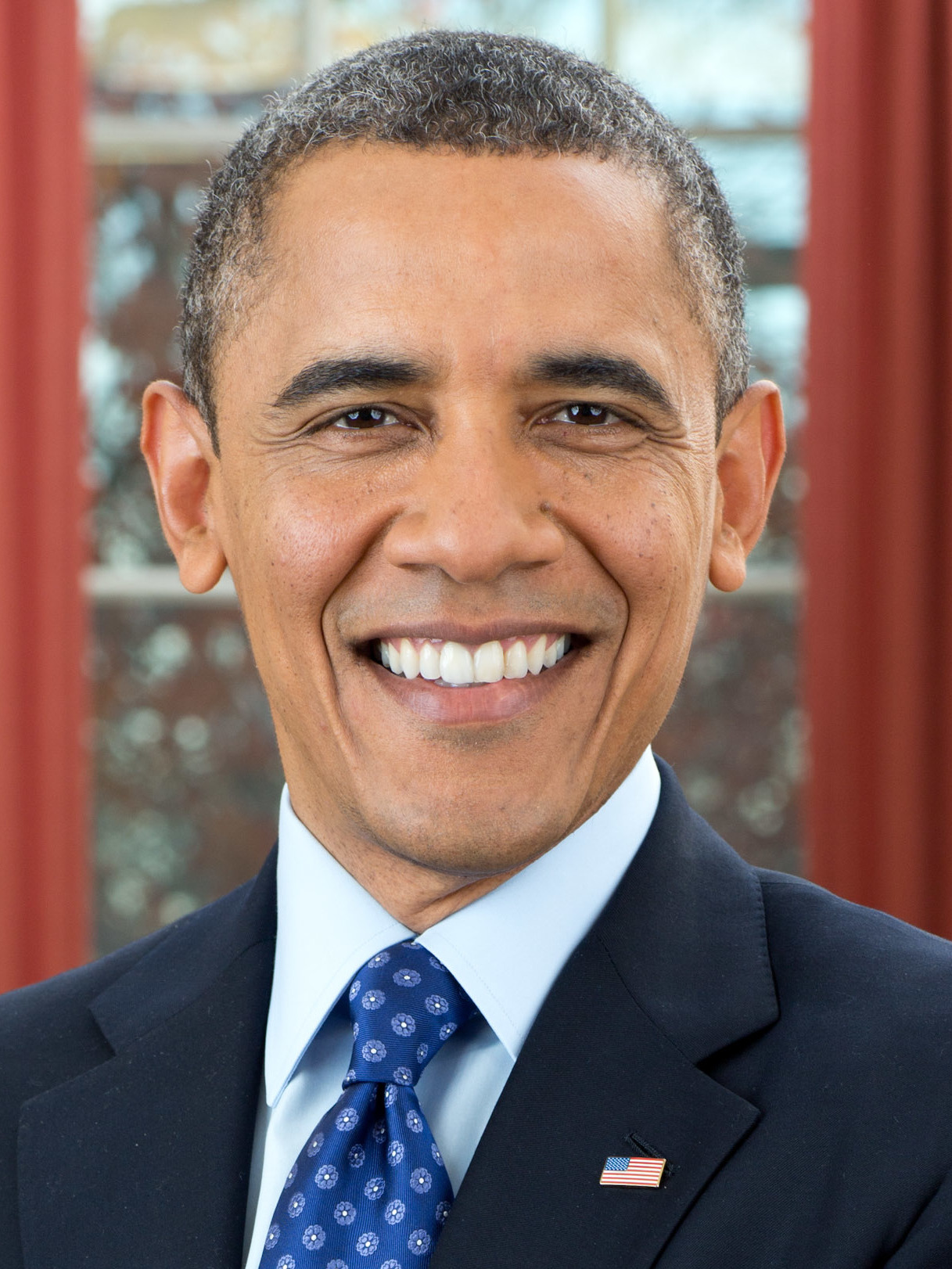
Barack Obama

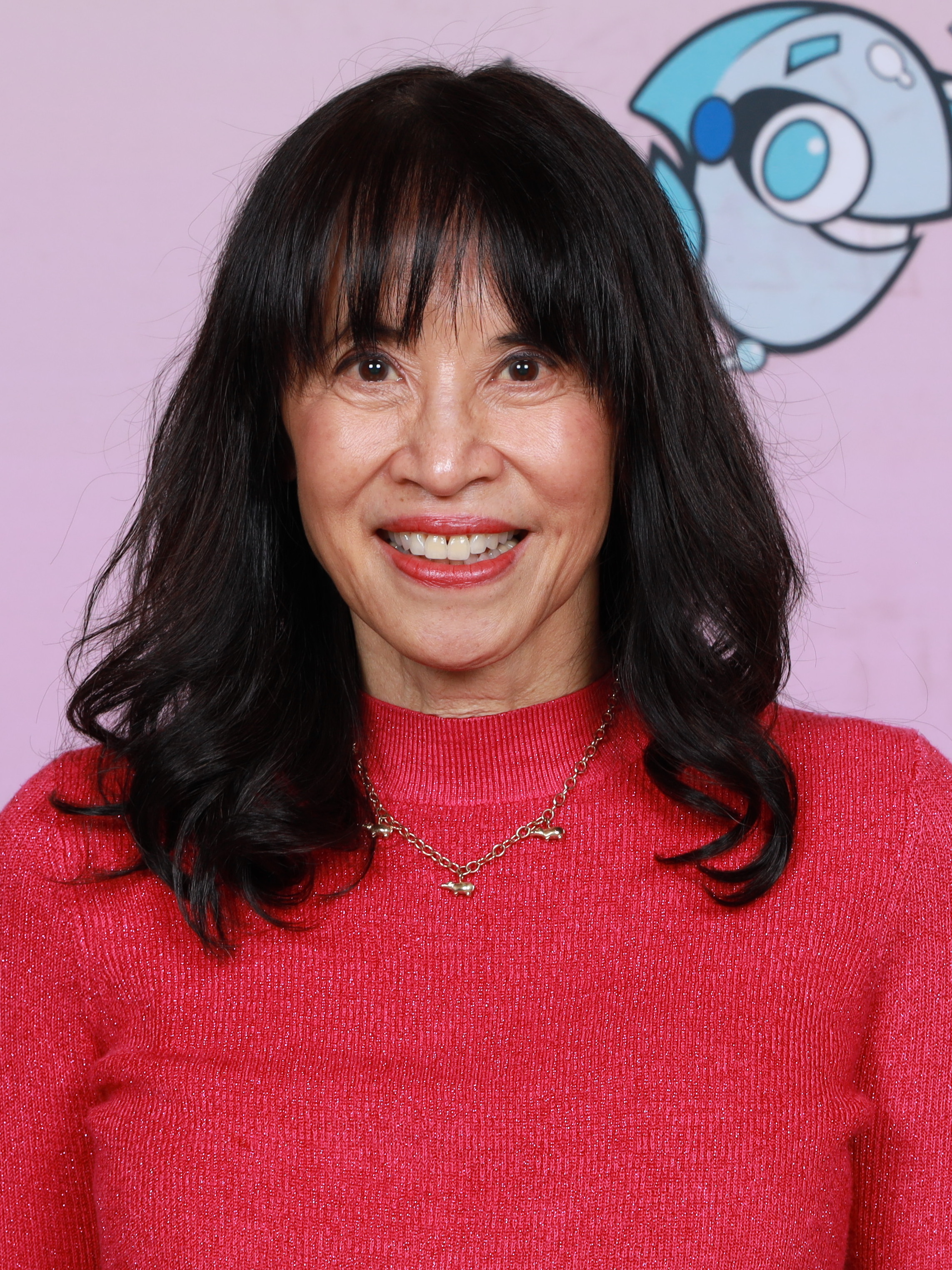
Lauren Tom

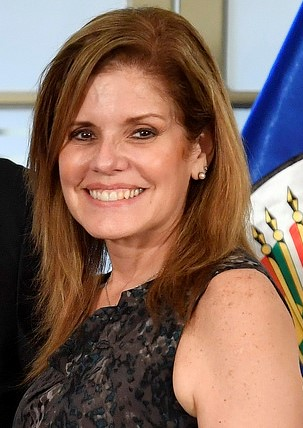
Mercedes Aráoz

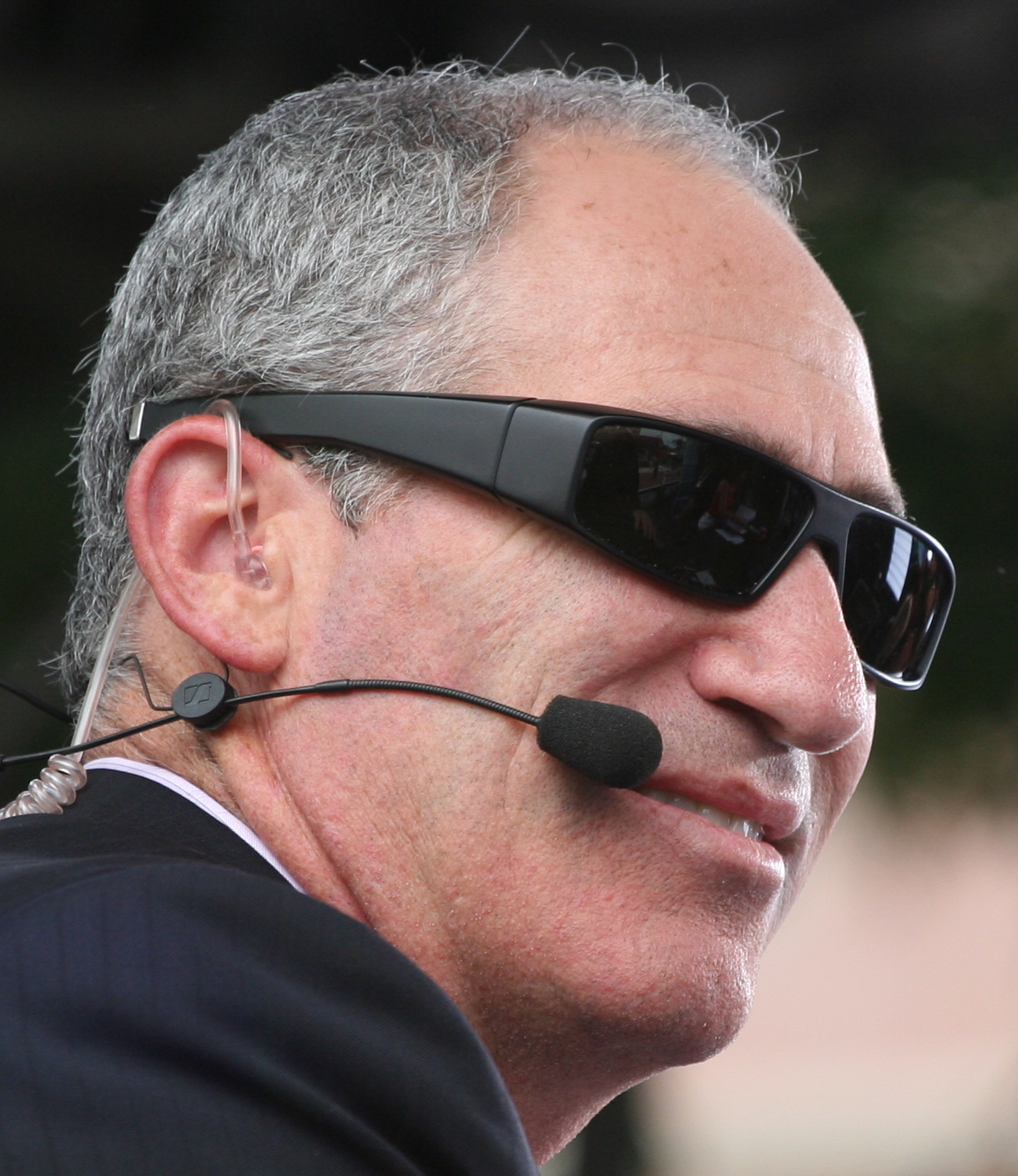
Brad Gilbert

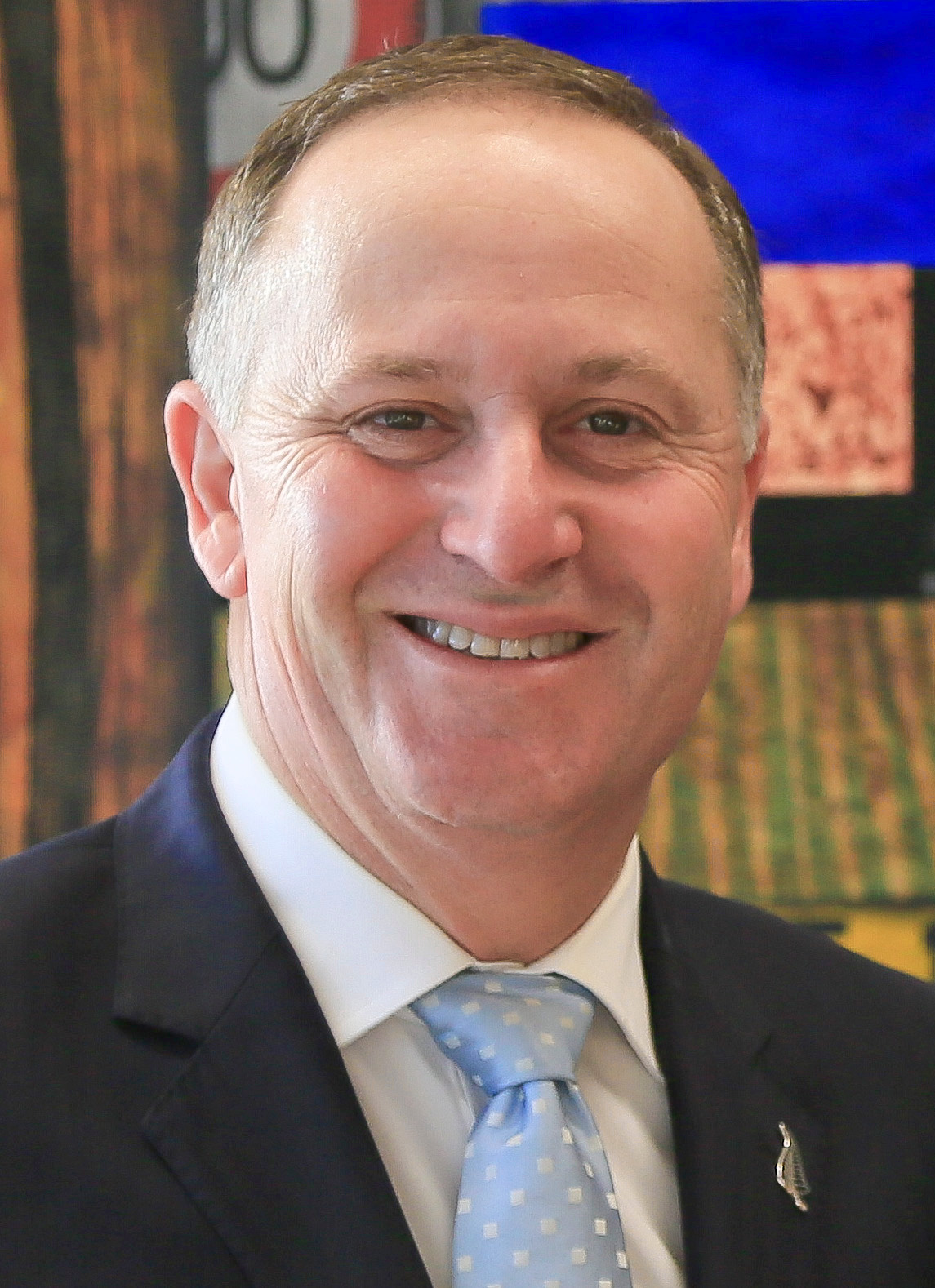
John Key

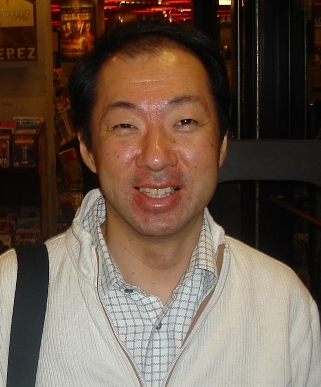
Koji Kondo

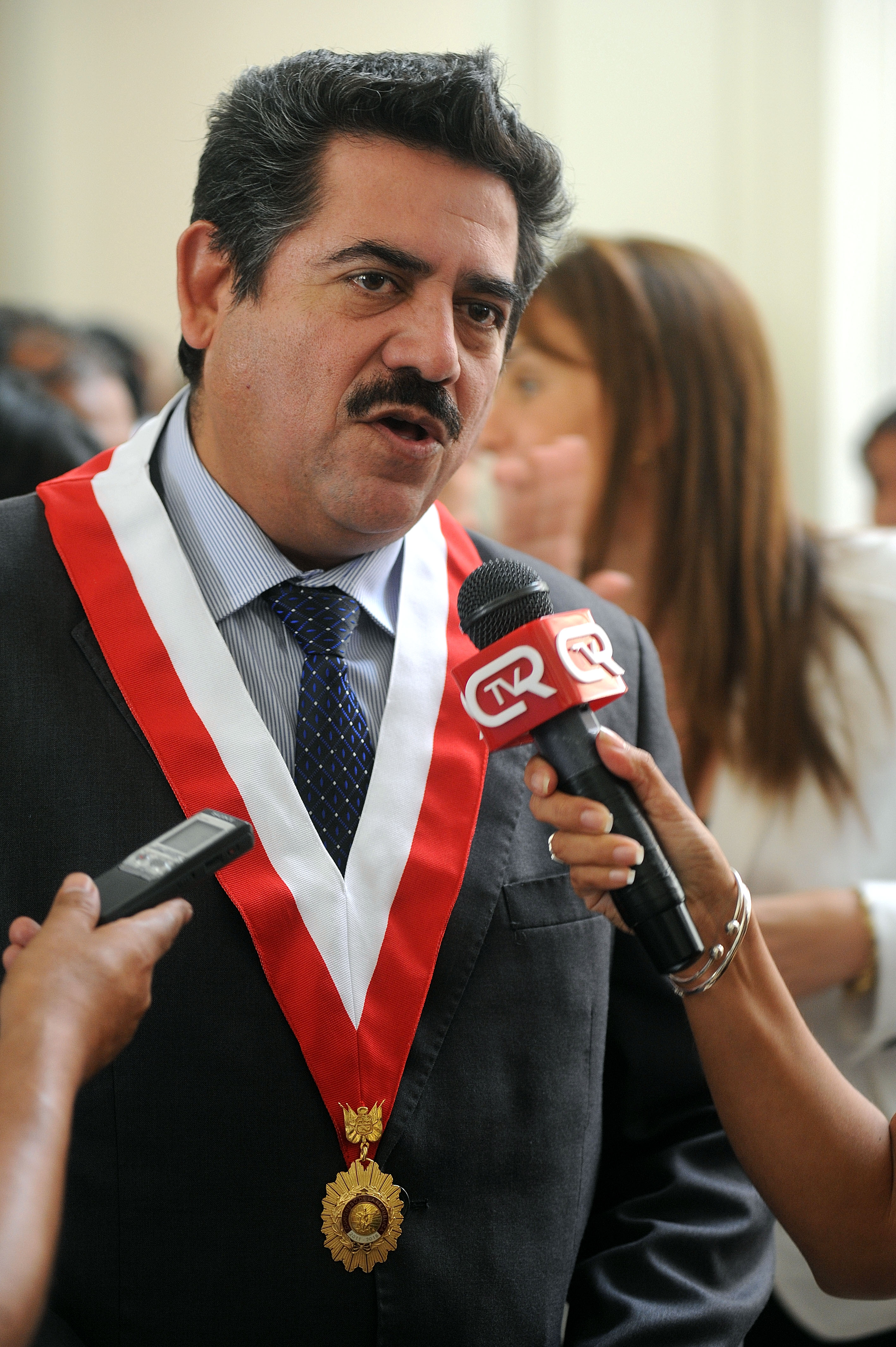
Manuel Merino

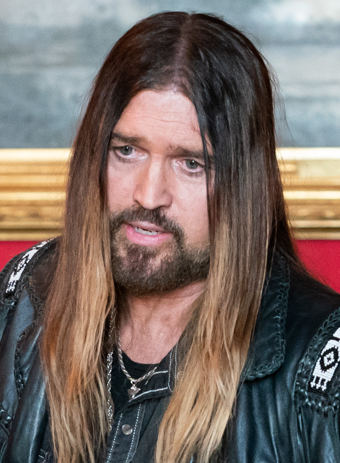
Billy Ray Cyrus

- August 1 – Danny Blind, Dutch footballer
- August 2 – Pete de Freitas, English musician and producer (d. 1989)
- August 3 – Molly Hagan, American actress
- August 4
  - Pumpuang Duangjan, Thai megastar singer and actress (d. 1992)
  - Robin Carnahan, Secretary of State of Missouri
  - Barack Obama, 44th President of the United States
  - Lauren Tom, American actress and voice artist
- August 5
  - Mercedes Aráoz, 1st Vice President of Peru
  - Janet McTeer, English actress
- August 7
  - Yelena Davydova, Soviet gymnast
  - Maggie Wheeler, American actress
- August 8 – The Edge, Irish rock guitarist (U2)
- August 9
  - Brad Gilbert, American tennis player
  - John Key, 38th Prime Minister of New Zealand
- August 11 – Suniel Shetty, Indian actor, producer and entrepreneur
- August 13
  - Mahesh Anand, Indian actor (d. 2019)
  - Koji Kondo, Japanese video game composer (Nintendo)
- August 14 – Susan Olsen, American actress
- August 15 – Suhasini Maniratnam, Indian actress
- August 16
  - Elpidia Carrillo, Mexican-American actress
  - Urara Takano, Japanese voice actress
  - Aziz Akhannouch, 17th Prime Minister of Morocco
- August 17 – Uwe Schmitt, German sprinter and hurdler (d. 1995)
- August 18
  - Huw Edwards, BAFTA award-winning Welsh journalist and presenter
  - Timothy Geithner, 75th US Treasury Secretary
- August 20
  - Plamen Nikolov, Bulgarian footballer
  - Linda Manz, American actress (d. 2020)
  - Manuel Merino, Peruvian politician, 68th President of Peru
- August 21 – Stephen Hillenburg, American marine biologist, cartoonist and animator (d. 2018)
- August 23
  - Bhupesh Baghel, Indian politician and current Chief Minister of Chhattisgarh
  - Alexandre Desplat, French film composer
- August 25
  - Billy Ray Cyrus, American actor and singer
  - Benjamin Bwalya, Zambian footballer and coach (d. 1999)
- August 27 – Tom Ford, American fashion designer and film director
- August 28
  - Jennifer Coolidge, American actress and comedian
  - Deepak Tijori, Indian actor and director

=== September ===
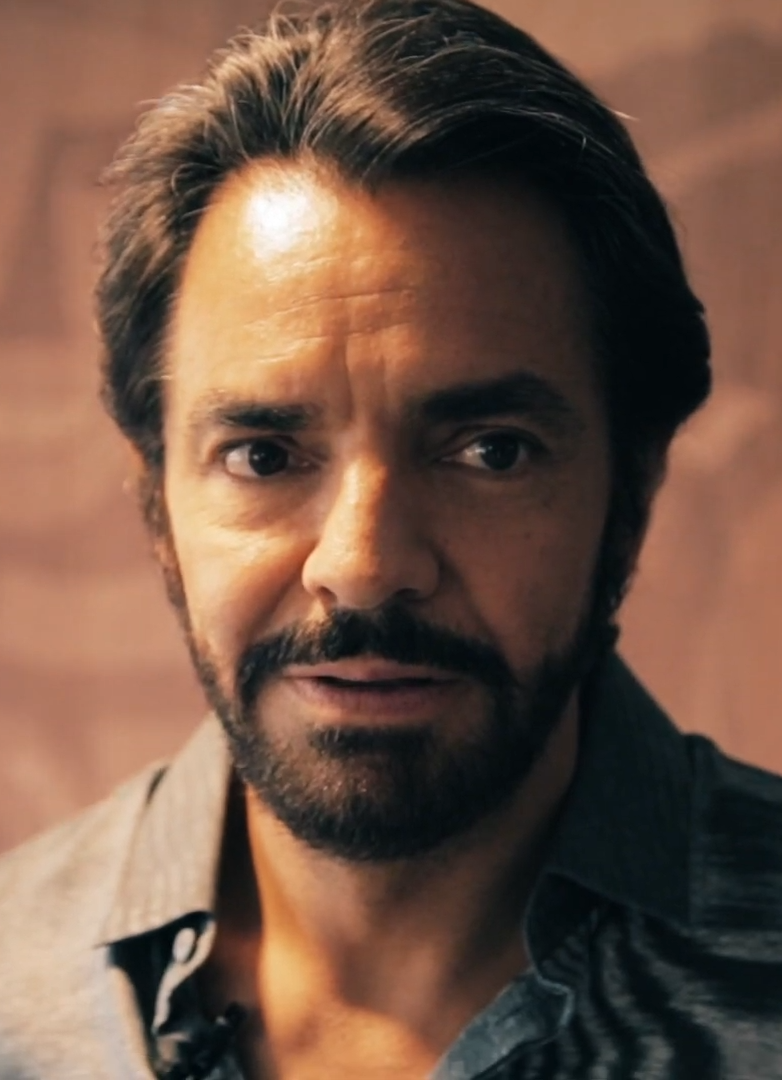
Eugenio Derbez

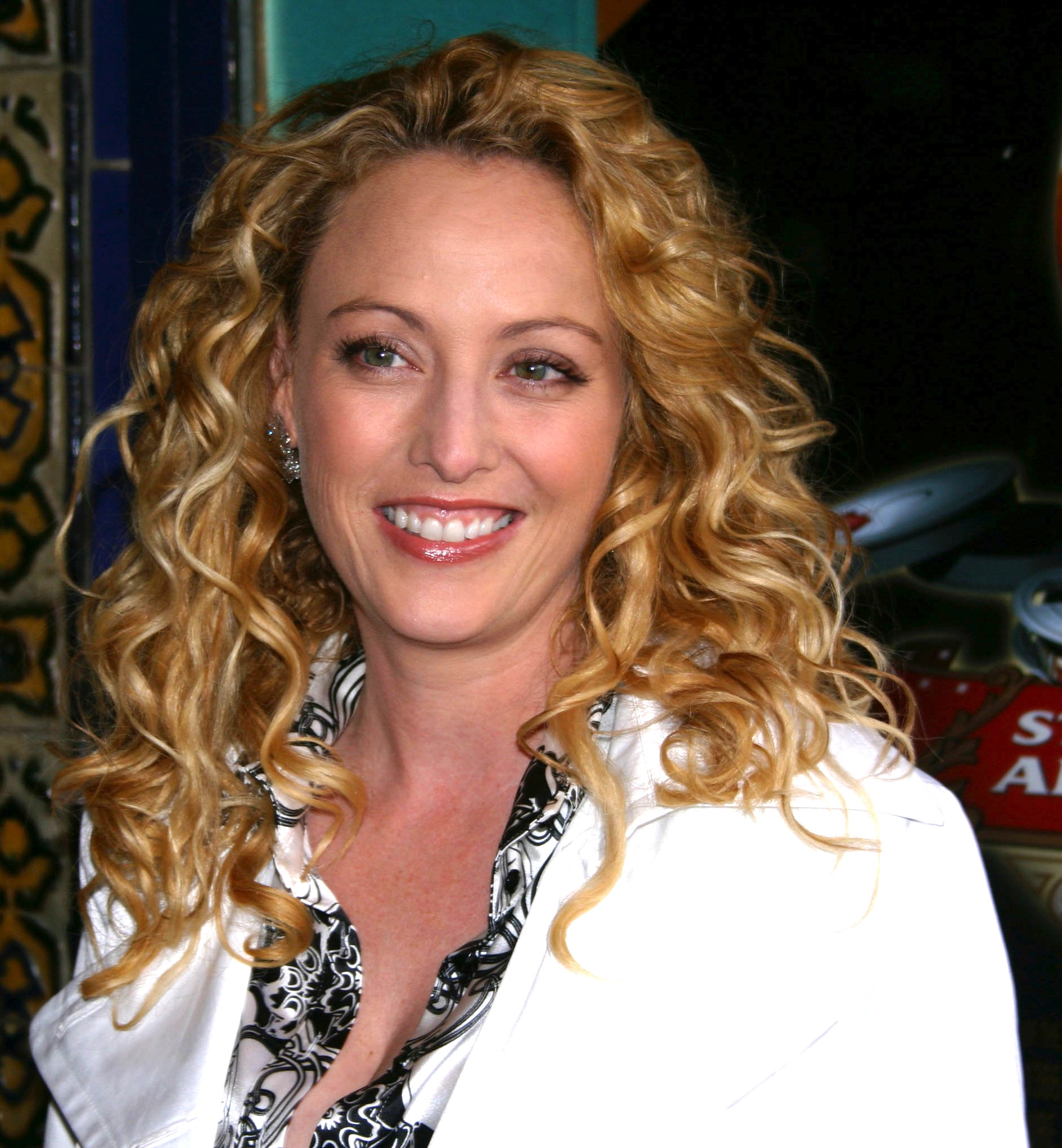
Virginia Madsen

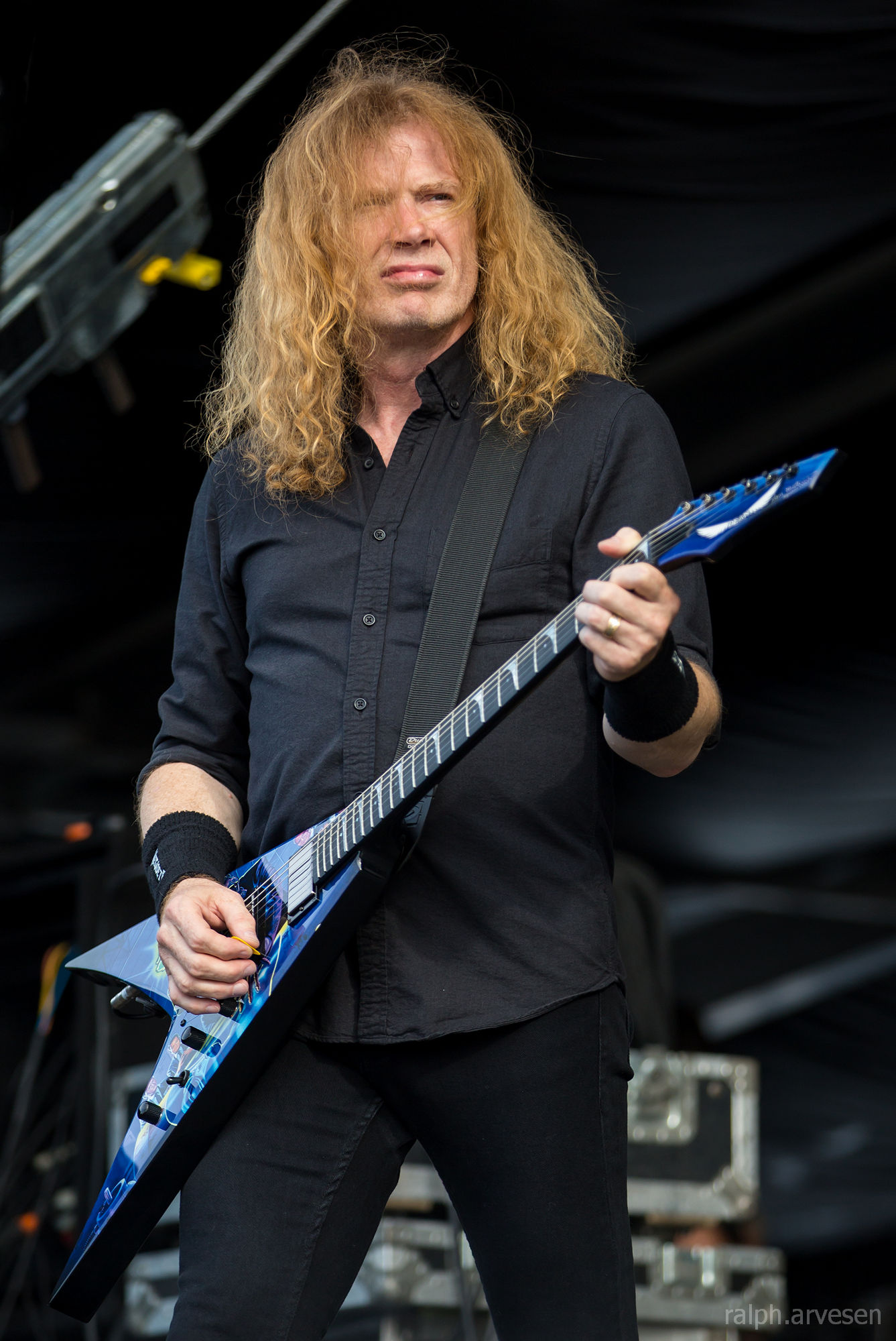
Dave Mustaine

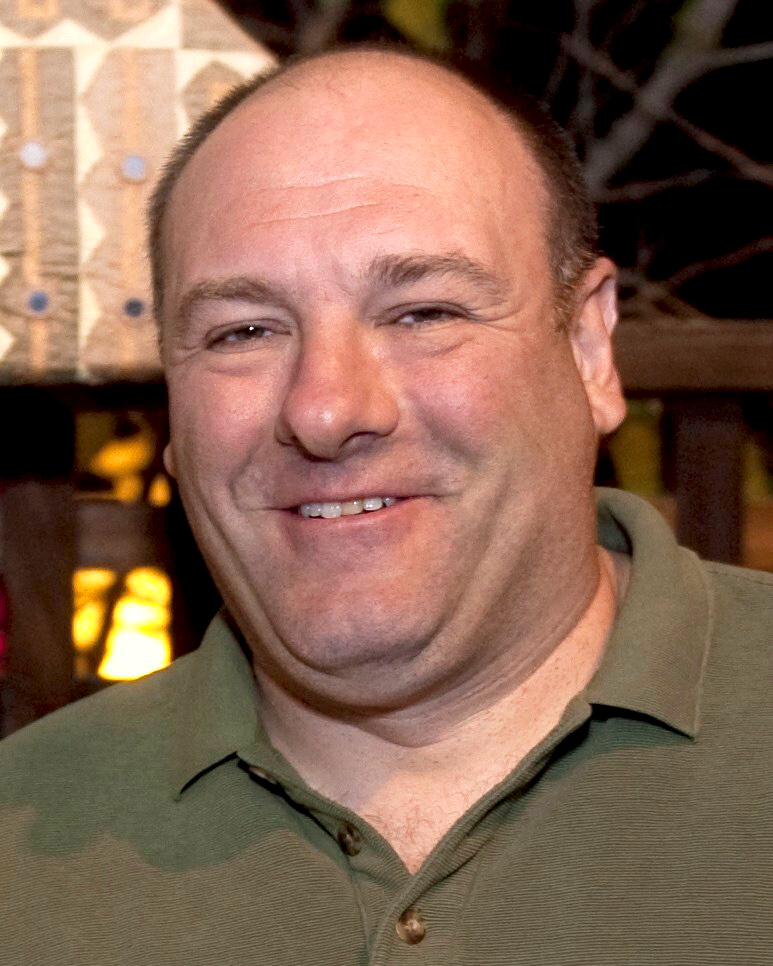
James Gandolfini

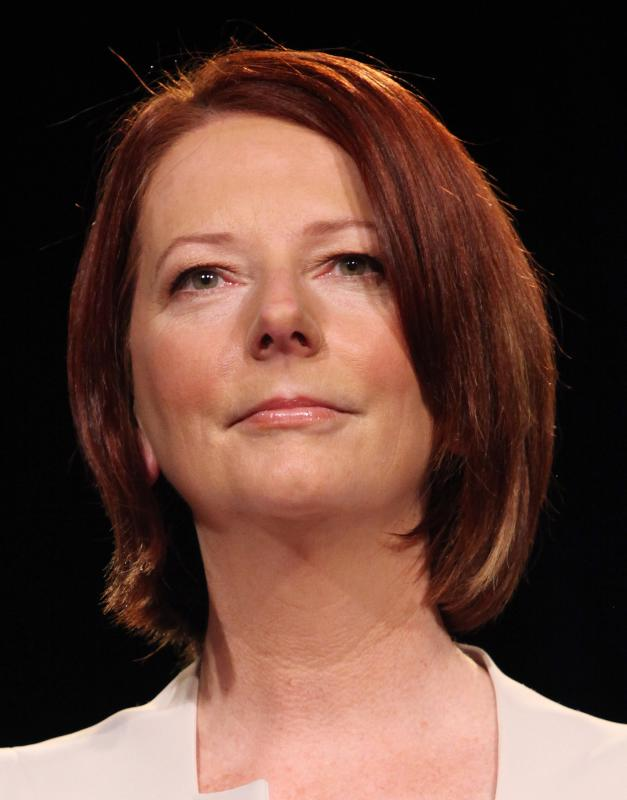
Julia Gillard

- September 1 – Bam Bam Bigelow, American professional wrestler (d. 2007)
- September 2
  - Carlos Valderrama, Colombian footballer
  - Anthony Wong Chau-sang, Hong Kong actor
- September 3
  - Andy Griffiths, Australian author
  - Iwan Fals, Indonesian singer-songwriter
- September 5 – Marc-André Hamelin, Canadian pianist and composer
- September 6 – Paul Waaktaar-Savoy, Norwegian rock musician and songwriter (A-ha)
- September 7 – Kevin Kennedy, British actor
- September 11
  - E.G. Daily, American actress, voice actress and singer
  - Virginia Madsen, American actress
- September 12 – Mylène Farmer, Canadian singer and songwriter
- September 13 – Dave Mustaine, American singer-songwriter and guitarist
- September 14 – Martina Gedeck, German actress
- September 15
  - Dan Marino, American football player
  - Lidia Yusupova, Chechen human-rights lawyer
- September 17 – Jim Cornette, American author and podcaster
- September 18 – James Gandolfini, American actor and producer (d. 2013)
- September 22
  - Bonnie Hunt, American actress, comedian, writer, director and television producer
  - Catherine Oxenberg, American actress
- September 23 – William C. McCool, U.S. Navy Commander and astronaut (d. 2003)
- September 24 – Fiona Corke, Australian actress
- September 25
  - Heather Locklear, American actress
  - Steve Scott, British journalist and presenter
- September 26 – Wes Hopkins, American football player (d. 2018)
- September 27
  - Andy Lau, Hong Kong actor and singer
  - Melissa Newman, American artist and singer
- September 28
  - Yordanka Donkova, Bulgarian athlete
  - Wayne Westner, South African golfer (d. 2017)
- September 29 – Julia Gillard, 27th Prime Minister of Australia
- September 30
  - Crystal Bernard, American actress and singer
  - Eric Stoltz, American actor and director
  - Sally Yeh, Hong Kong singer and actress

=== October ===
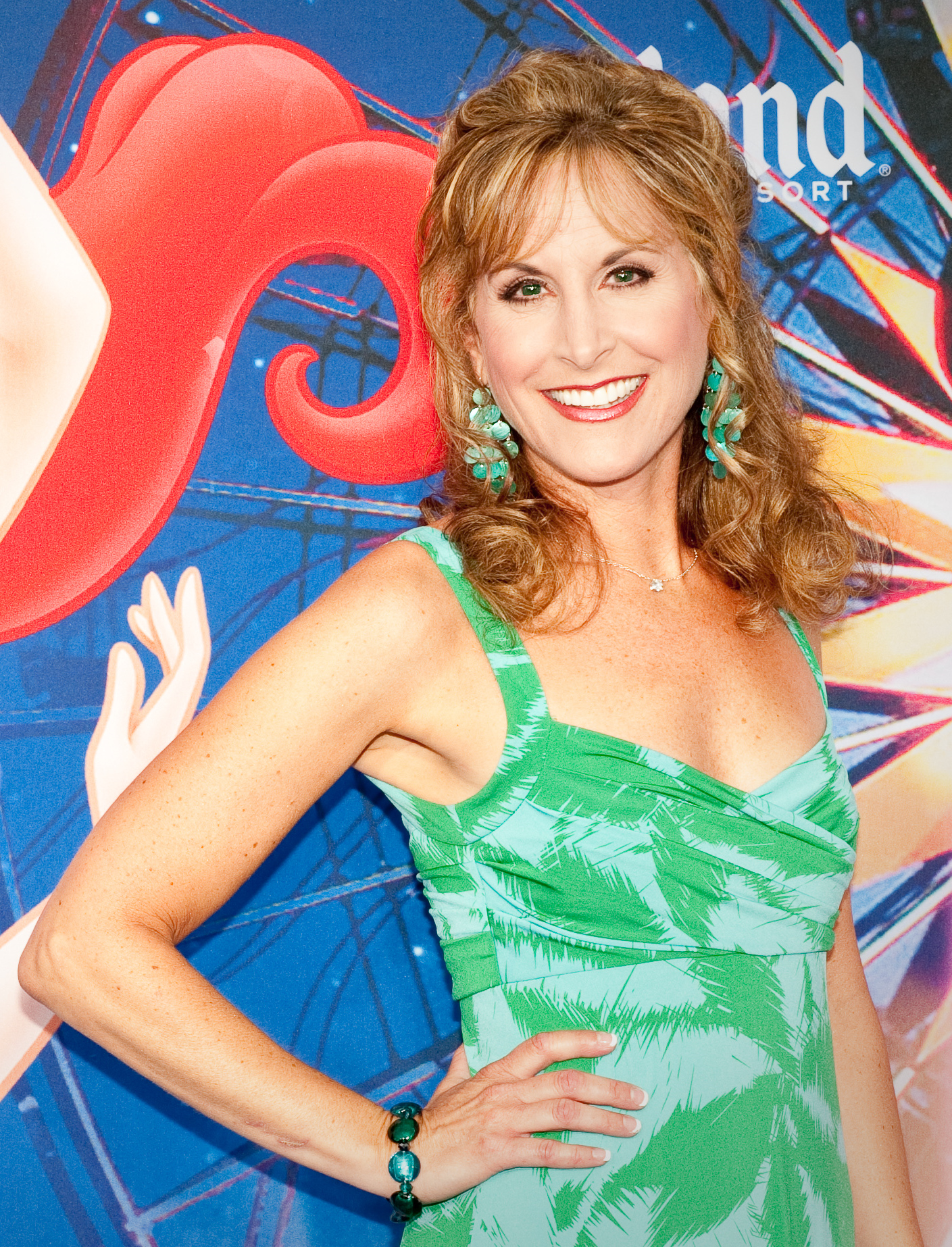
Jodi Benson

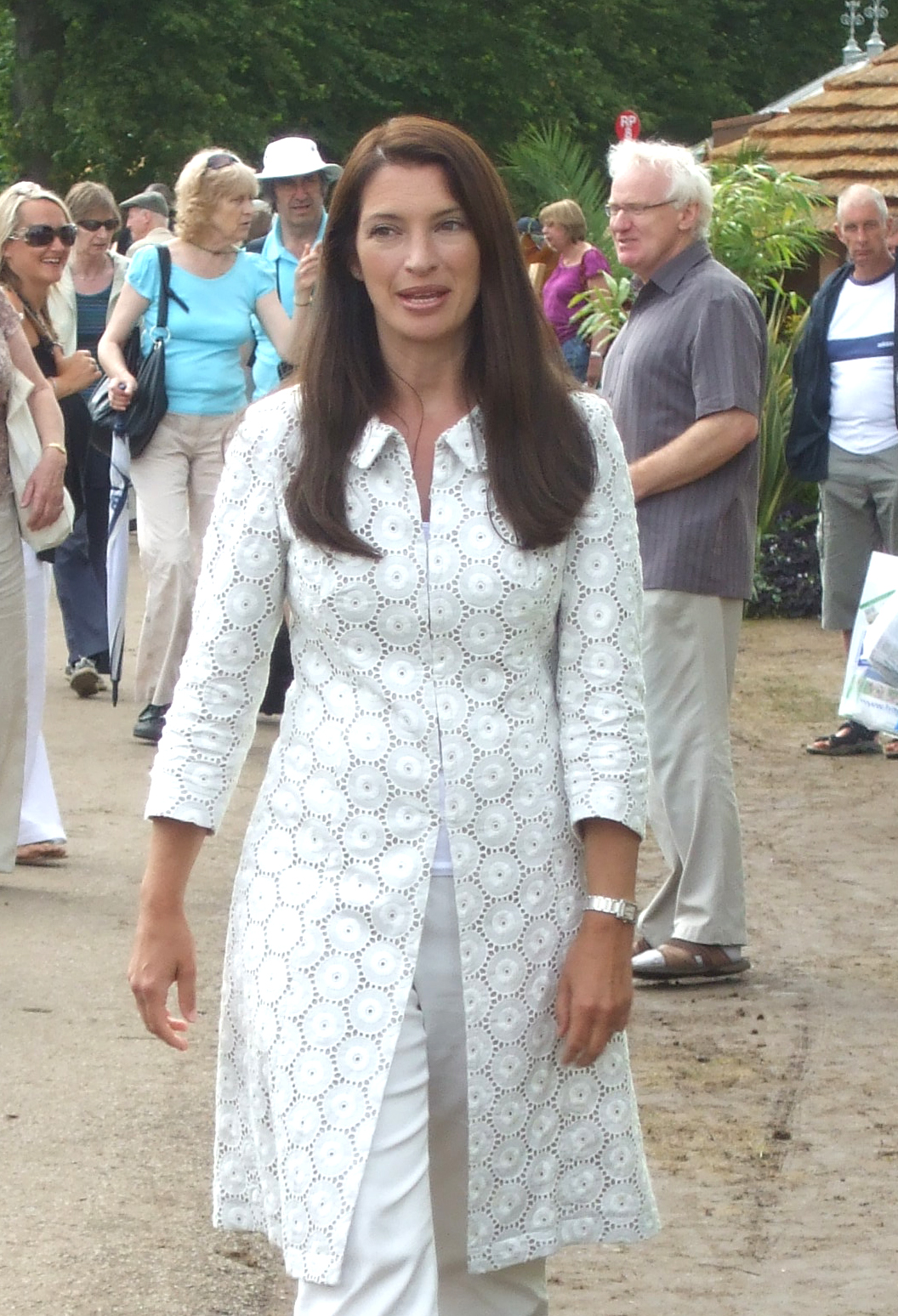
Rachel De Thame

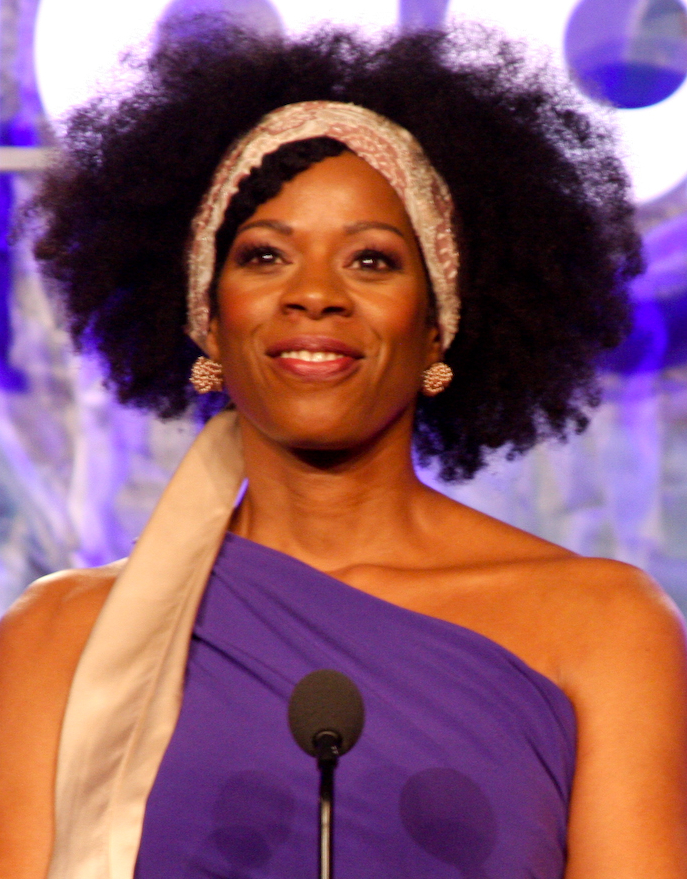
Kim Wayans

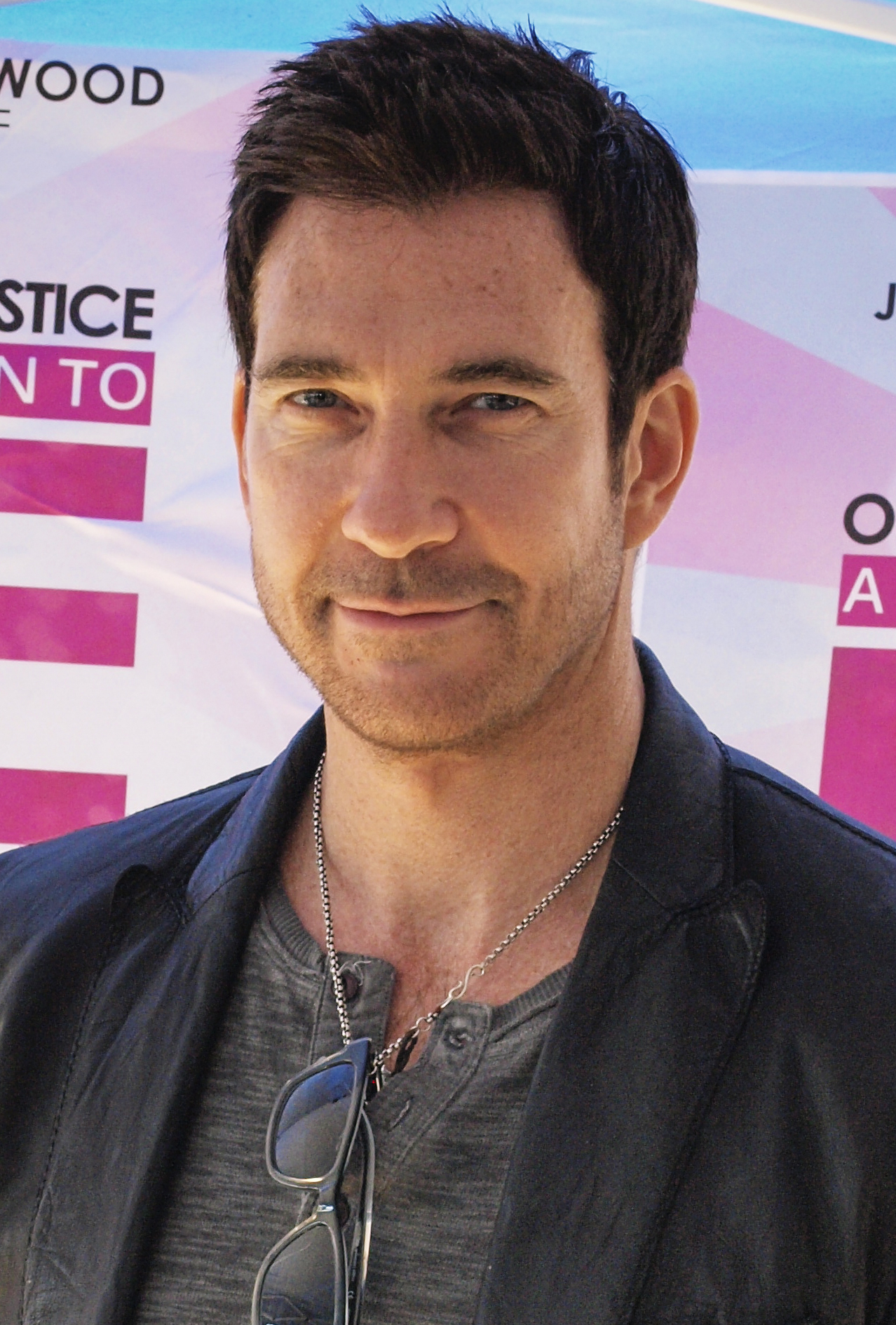
Dylan McDermott

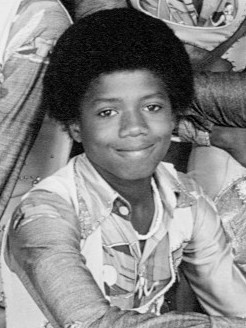
Randy Jackson

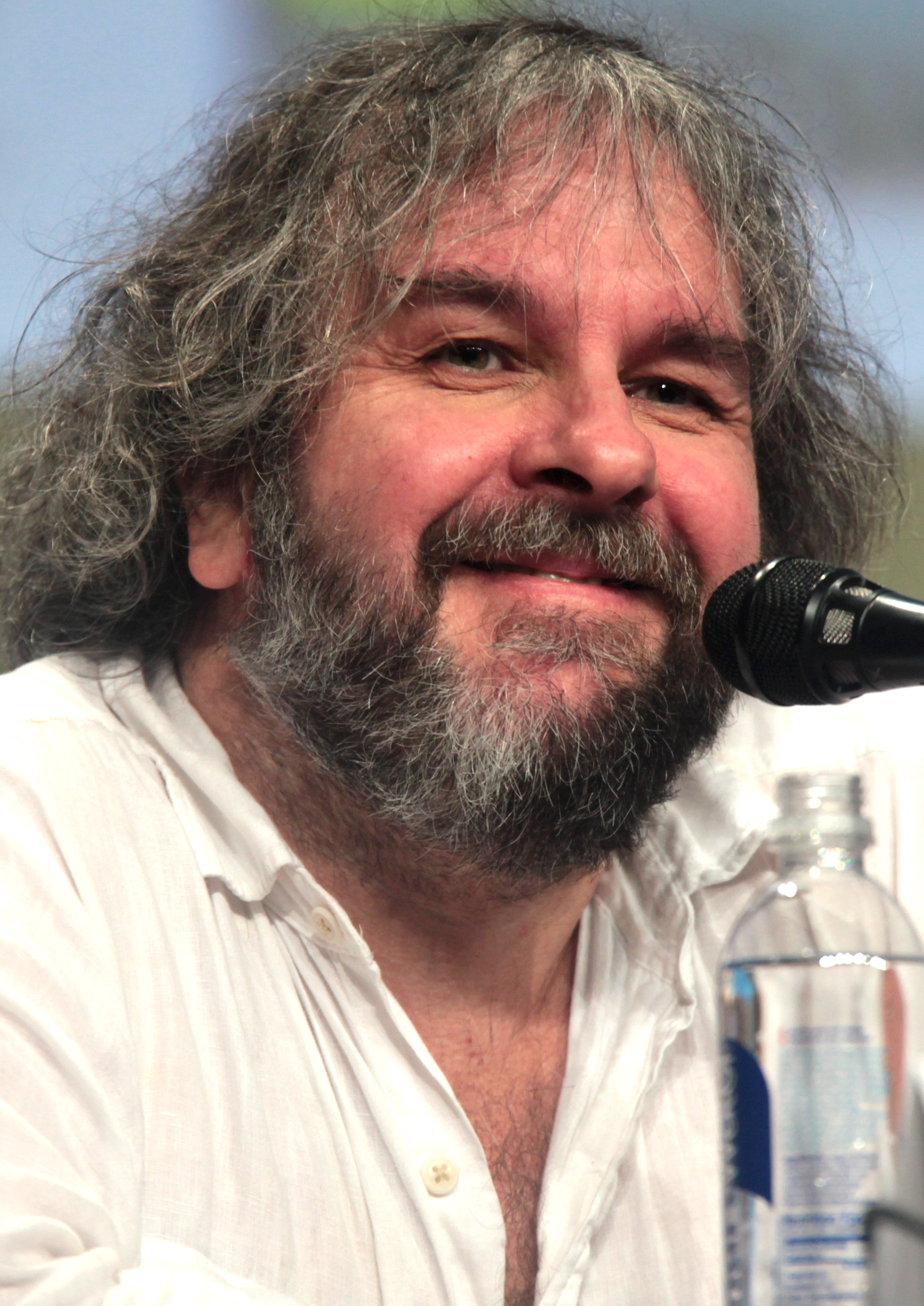
Peter Jackson

- October 1
  - Gary Ablett, Australian rules footballer
  - Rico Constantino, American professional wrestler
  - Michael Righeira, Italian singer-songwriter, musician and actor
- October 3 – Ludger Stühlmeyer, German cantor, composer and musicologist
- October 4
  - Philippe Russo, French singer
  - Jon Secada, Cuban-American singer-songwriter
  - Kazuki Takahashi, Japanese manga writer (d. 2022)
- October 5 – Matthew Kauffman, American journalist, George Polk Award winner
- October 6 – Mark Shasha, American artist, author and illustrator
- October 10 – Jodi Benson, American actress and singer
- October 11
  - Amr Diab, Egyptian singer
  - Steve Young, American football player
- October 12 – Diego García, Spanish long-distance athlete (d. 2001)
- October 15 – Meera Sanyal, Indian banker (d. 2019)
- October 16
  - Randy Vasquez, American actor
  - Kim Wayans, American actress, comedian, producer, writer and director
- October 18
  - Wynton Marsalis, African-American trumpeter and composer
  - Gladstone Small, Barbadian-English cricketer
- October 19 – Cliff Lyons, Australian rugby league player
- October 20
  - Ian Rush, Welsh footballer
  - Les Stroud, Canadian survival expert, filmmaker and musician
  - Michie Tomizawa, Japanese voice actress
- October 24 – Dave Meltzer, American wrestling journalist
- October 25 – Chad Smith, American musician
- October 26
  - Dylan McDermott, American actor
  - Uhuru Kenyatta, 4th President of the Republic of Kenya
- October 29 – Randy Jackson, American singer
- October 30 – Dmitry Muratov, Russian campaigning journalist, recipient of the Nobel Peace Prize
- October 31
  - Alonzo Babers, American runner
  - Peter Jackson, New Zealand film director
  - Larry Mullen, Jr., Irish rock drummer (U2)

=== November ===
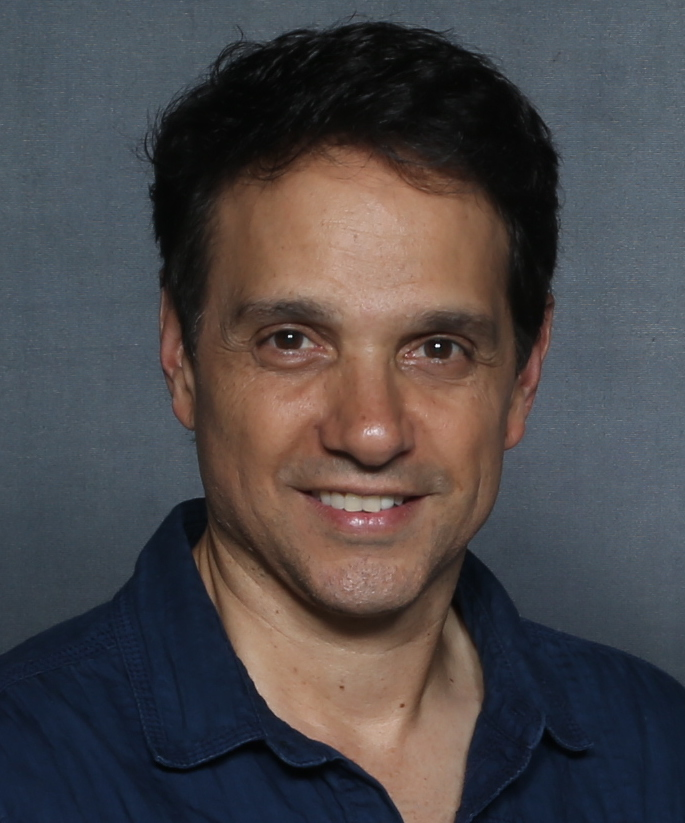
Ralph Macchio

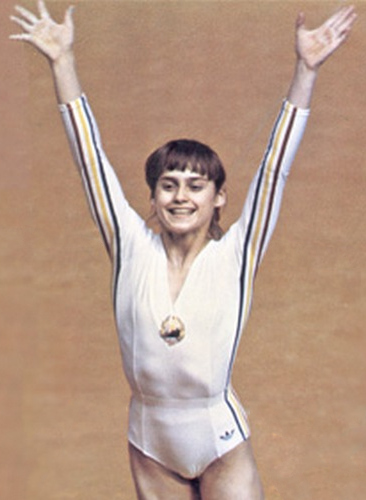
Nadia Comăneci

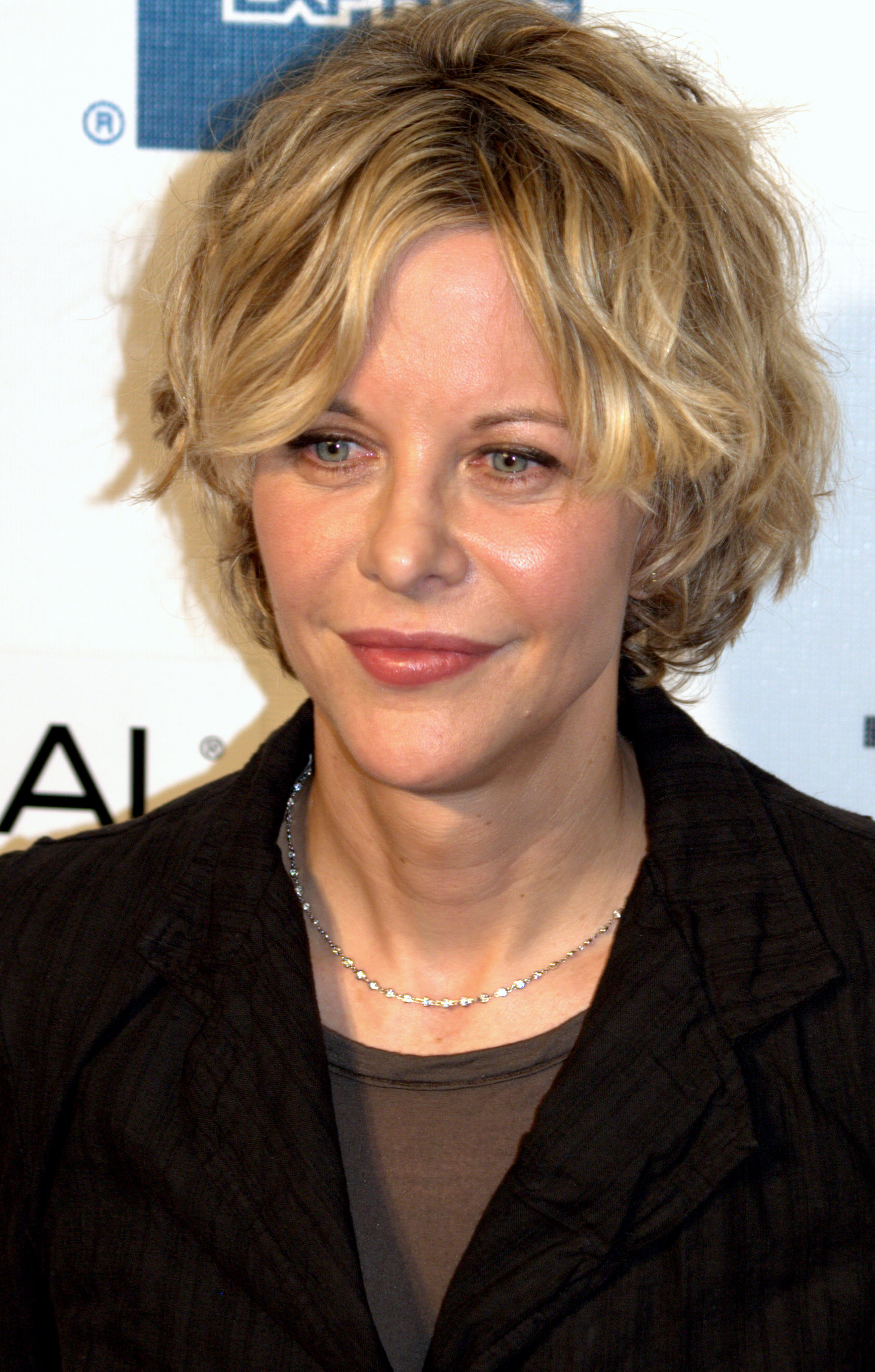
Meg Ryan

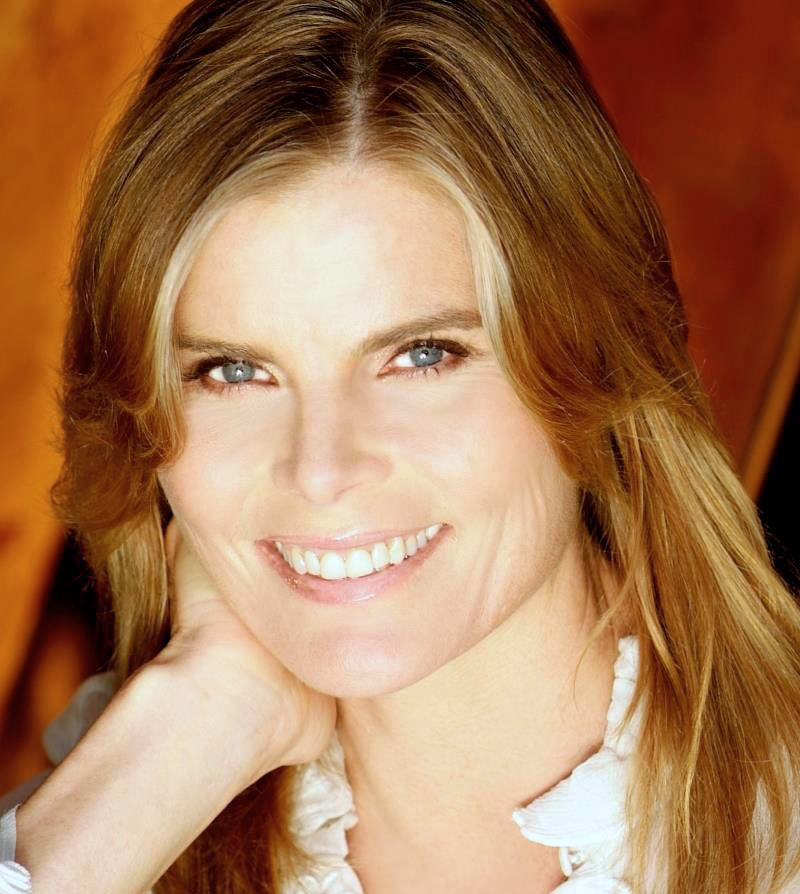
Mariel Hemingway

- November 1
  - Anne Donovan, American basketball player and coach (d. 2018)
  - Petr Pavel, current President of the Czech Republic
- November 2
  - k.d. lang, Canadian singer and songwriter
- November 3 – David Armstrong-Jones, 2nd Earl of Snowdon
- November 4
  - Daron Hagen, American composer
  - Ralph Macchio, American actor
  - Jeff Probst, American television personality
  - Jerry Sadowitz, American-born British stand-up comic and card magician
  - Nigel Worthington, Northern Irish footballer and football manager
- November 5 – Alan G. Poindexter, American astronaut (d. 2012)
- November 9
  - Jill Dando, British journalist and television presenter (d. 1999)
  - Jackie Kay, Scottish poet and novelist
- November 12 – Nadia Comăneci, Romanian gymnast
- November 14
  - Ben Coleman, American basketball player (d. 2019)
  - Jurga Ivanauskaitė, Lithuanian writer (d. 2007)
  - D. B. Sweeney, American actor
- November 16
  - Andrea Prodan, Scottish-Italian film actor, composer and musician
  - Corinne Hermès, French singer, Eurovision Song Contest 1983 winner
- November 18 – Steven Moffat, Scottish screenwriter
- November 19 – Meg Ryan, American actress and film director
- November 22
  - Mariel Hemingway, American actress
  - Stephen Hough, British-Australian pianist and polymath
- November 24 – Arundhati Roy, Indian writer and activist
- November 25 – Matthias Freihof, German television actor and director
- November 28 – Alfonso Cuarón, Mexican film director, screenwriter and producer
- November 29 – Kim Delaney, American actress

=== December ===
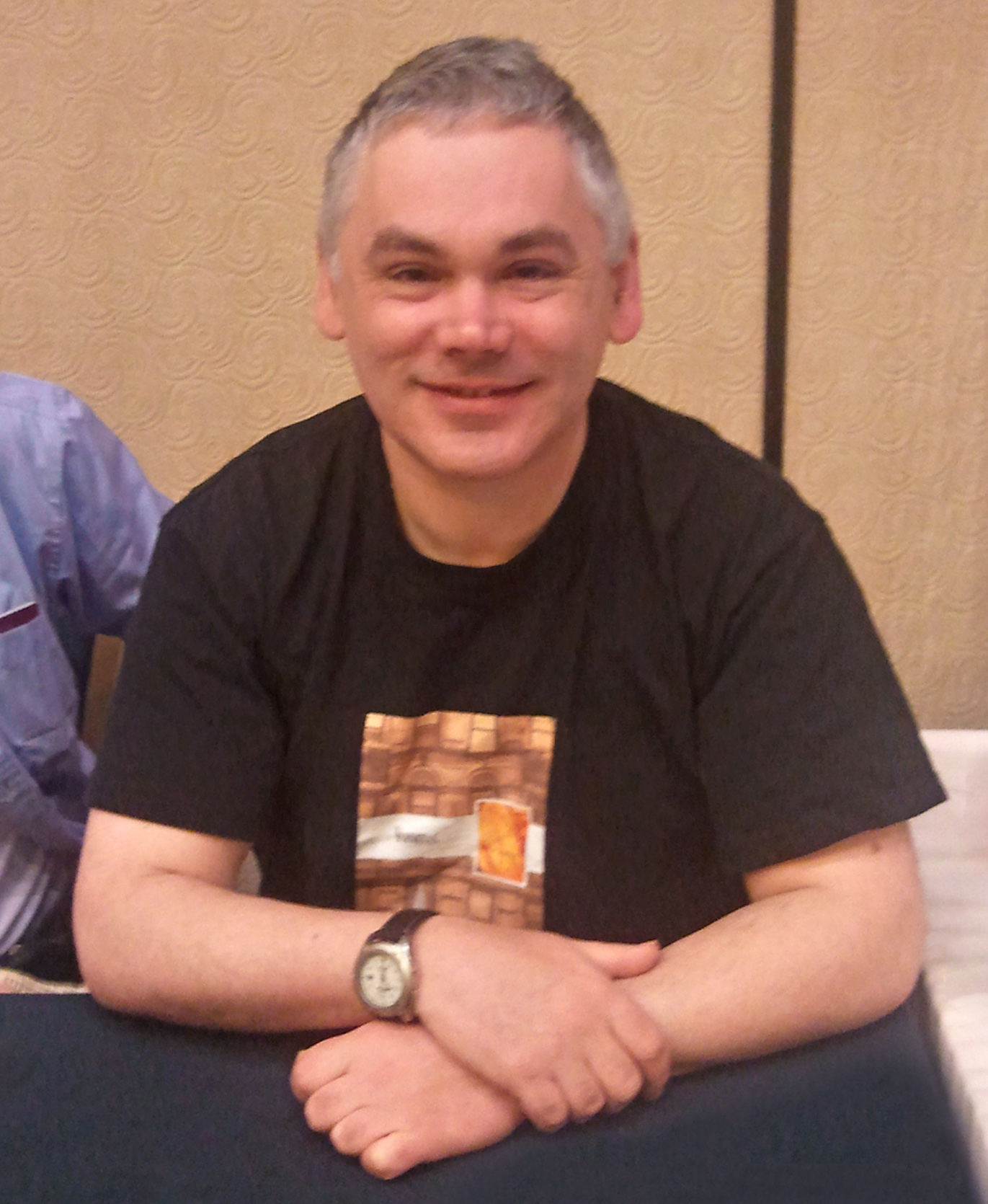
Matthew Waterhouse

- December 3 – Marcelo Fromer, Brazilian guitarist
- December 5
  - Alan Davies, English-Welsh international footballer (d. 1992)
  - Laura Flanders, British born American journalist
- December 8 – Ann Coulter, American author, conservative commentator and attorney
- December 9
  - Beril Dedeoğlu, Turkish politician and academic (d. 2019)
  - David Anthony Higgins, American actor
- December 10
  - Pasang Lhamu Sherpa, Nepalese Buddhist (d. 1993)
  - Nia Peeples, American actress
- December 12 – Daniel O'Donnell, Irish singer
- December 13
  - Juan Carlos Varela, Panamanian businessman and 37th President of Panama
  - Karen Witter, American actress and model
- December 15 – Karin Resetarits, Austrian journalist and politician
- December 16
  - Bill Hicks, American comedian (d. 1994)
  - Shane Black, American film director
- December 19
  - Eric Allin Cornell, American physicist, Nobel Prize laureate
  - Reggie White, American football player (d. 2004)
- December 20 – Mohammad Fouad, Arab singer and actor
- December 21 – Francis Ng, Hong Kong actor
- December 22 – Kassim Majaliwa, 10th Prime Minister of Tanzania
- December 23 – Ezzat el Kamhawi, Egyptian novelist
- December 24 – Ilham Aliyev, 7th Prime Minister of Azerbaijan and 4th President of Azerbaijan
- December 25
  - Íngrid Betancourt, Colombian senator
  - Ghislaine Maxwell, British socialite
  - David Thompson, 6th Prime Minister of Barbados (d. 2010)
- December 26 – John Lynch, Northern Irish actor
- December 27 – Guido Westerwelle, German politician (d. 2016)
- December 30
  - Douglas Coupland, Canadian author
  - Bill English, 39th Prime Minister of New Zealand
  - Sean Hannity, American radio/television host and conservative commentator
  - Ben Johnson, Canadian athlete
- December 31 – Aziz Akhannouch, Moroccan politician, Prime Minister of Morocco

== Deaths ==
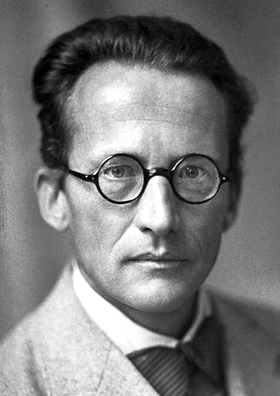
Erwin Schrödinger

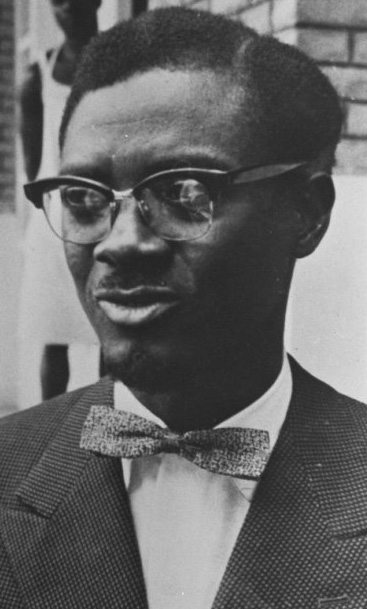
Patrice Lumumba

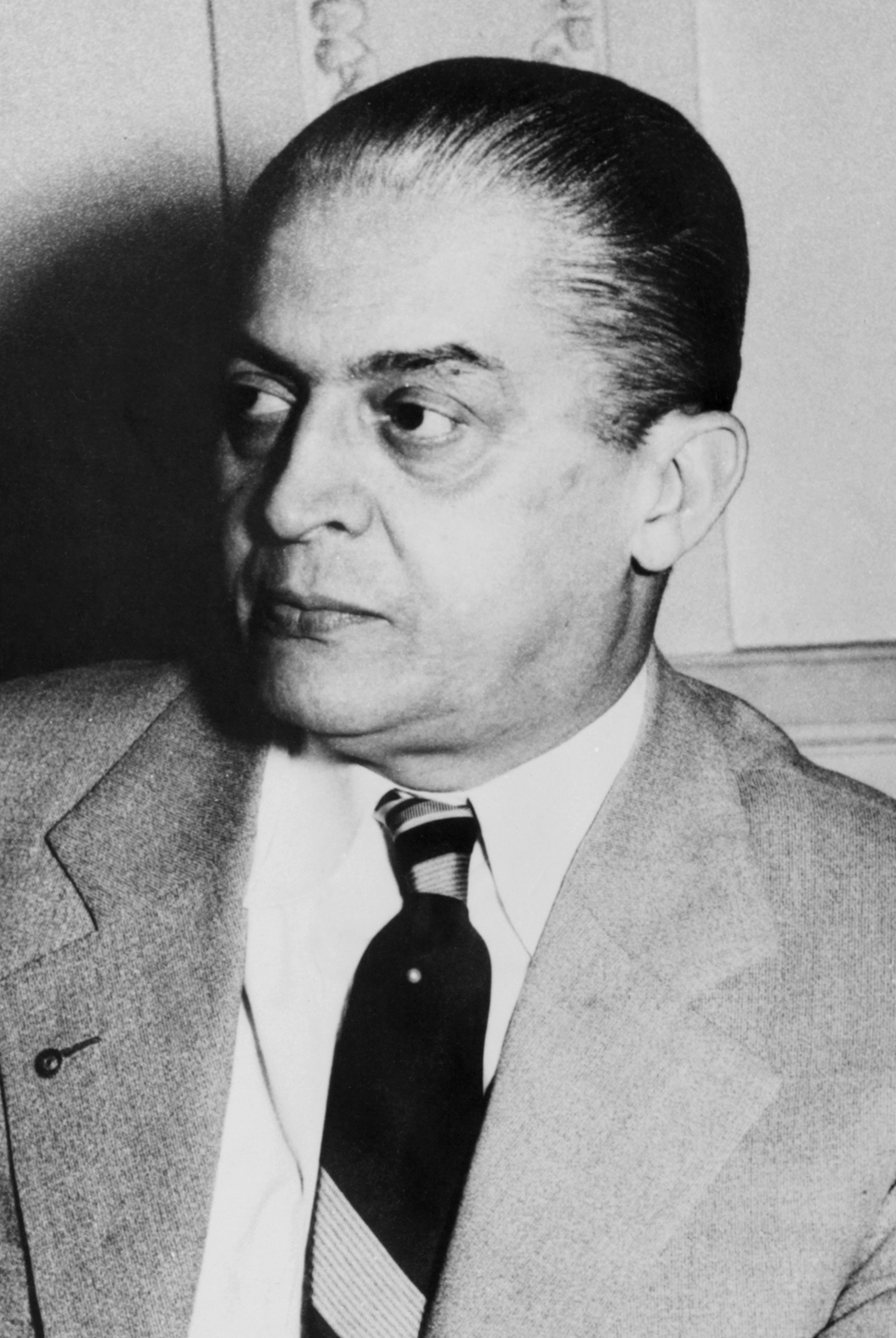
Carlos Luz

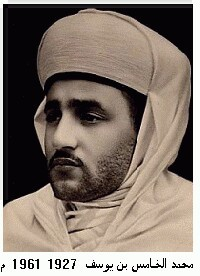
Mohammed V of Morocco

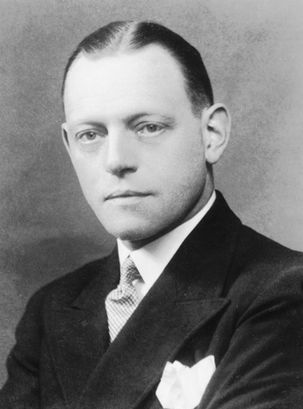
Oswald Rayner

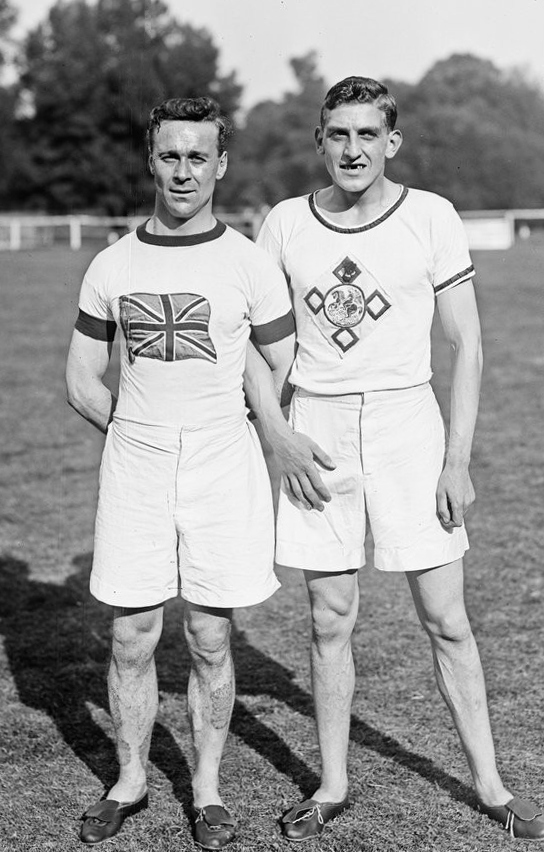
Victor d'Arcy

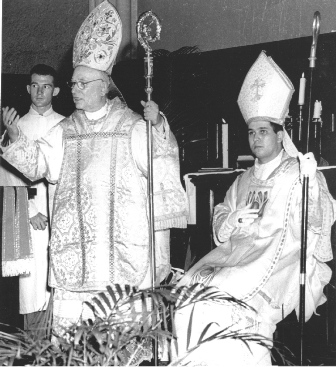
Carlos Duarte Costa

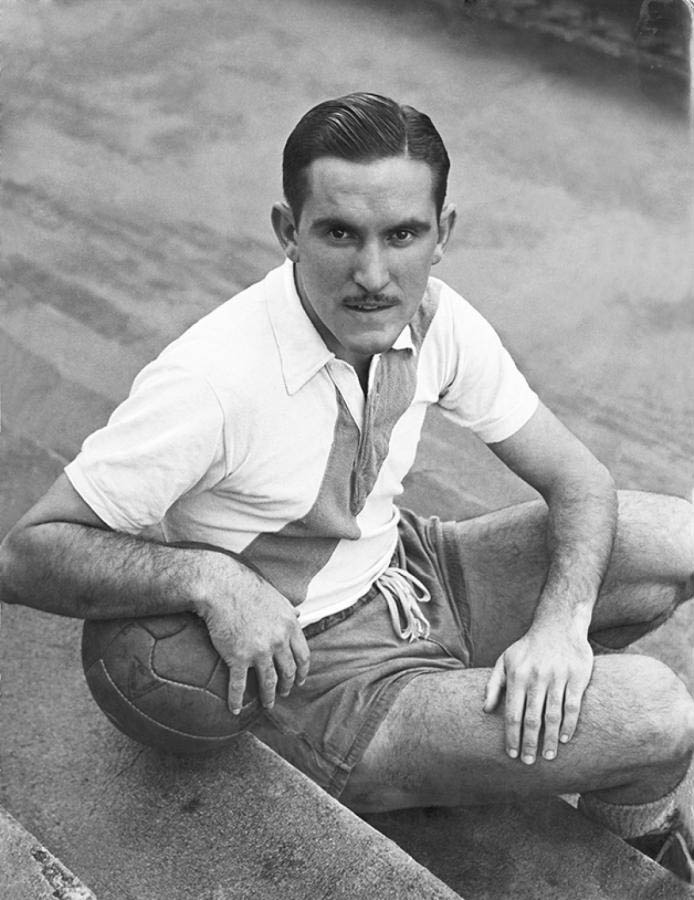
Eliseo Mouriño

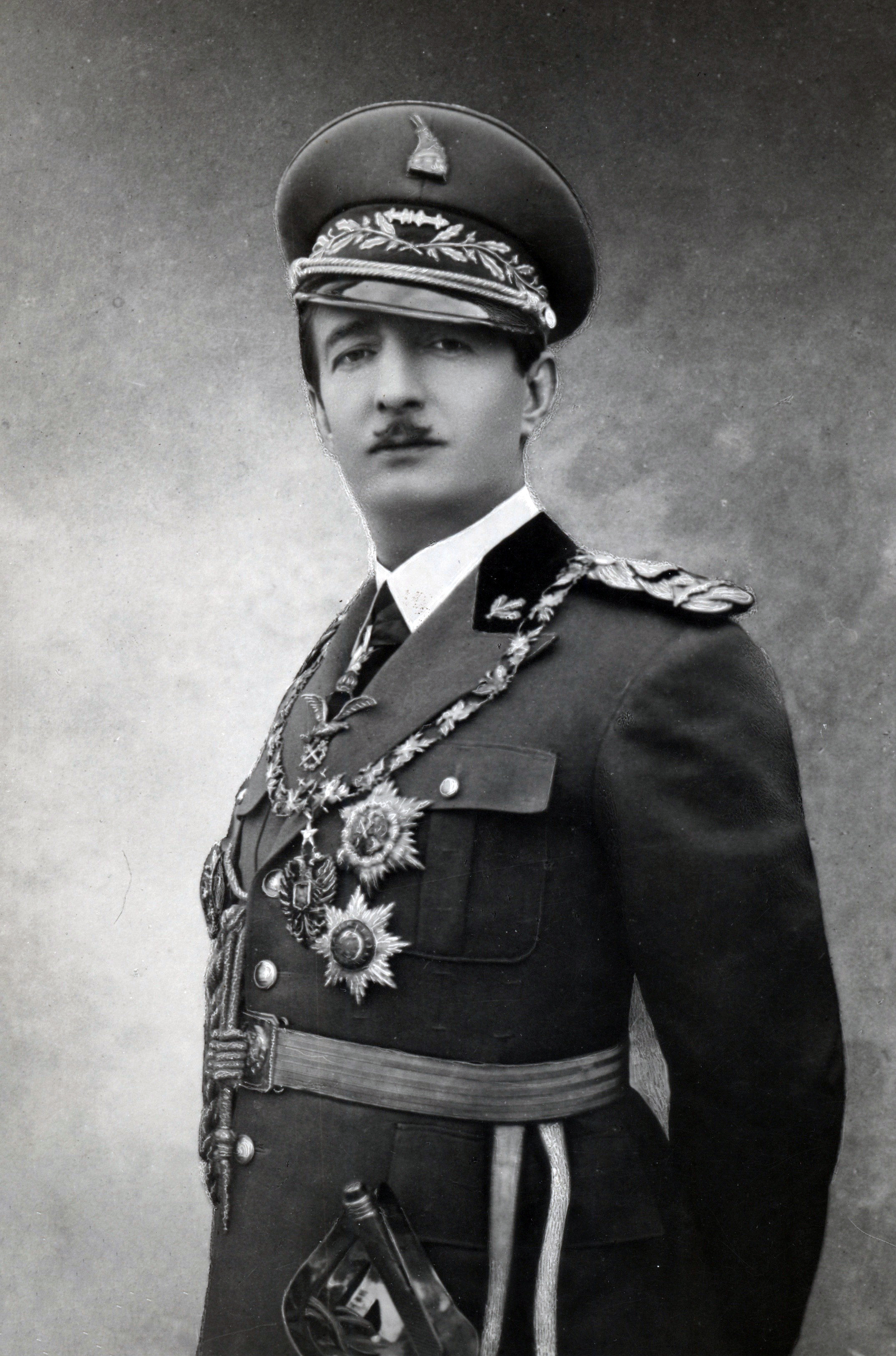
Zog I of Albania

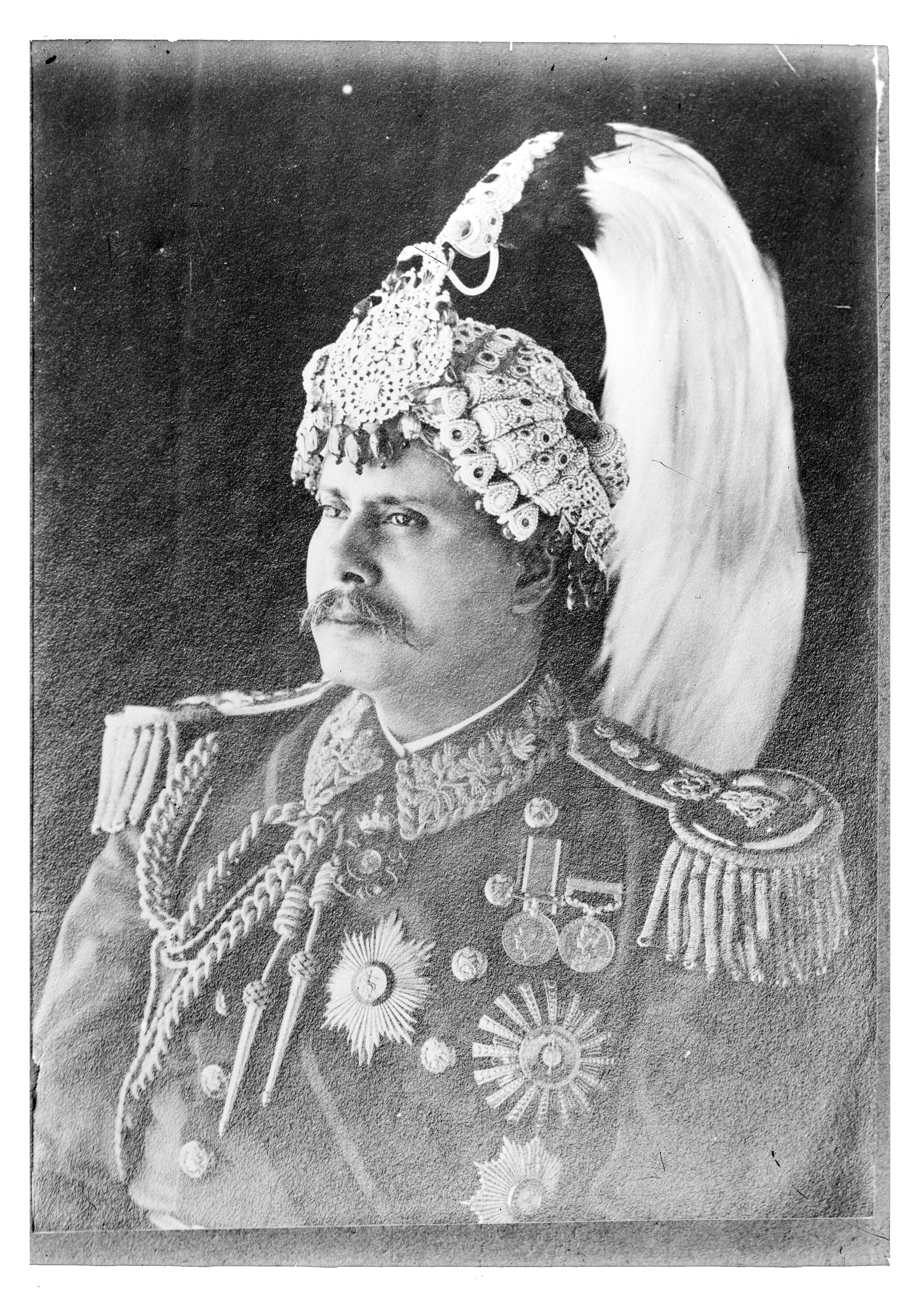
Padma Shumsher Jung Bahadur Rana

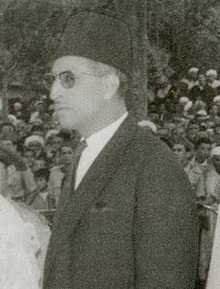
Mbarek Bekkay

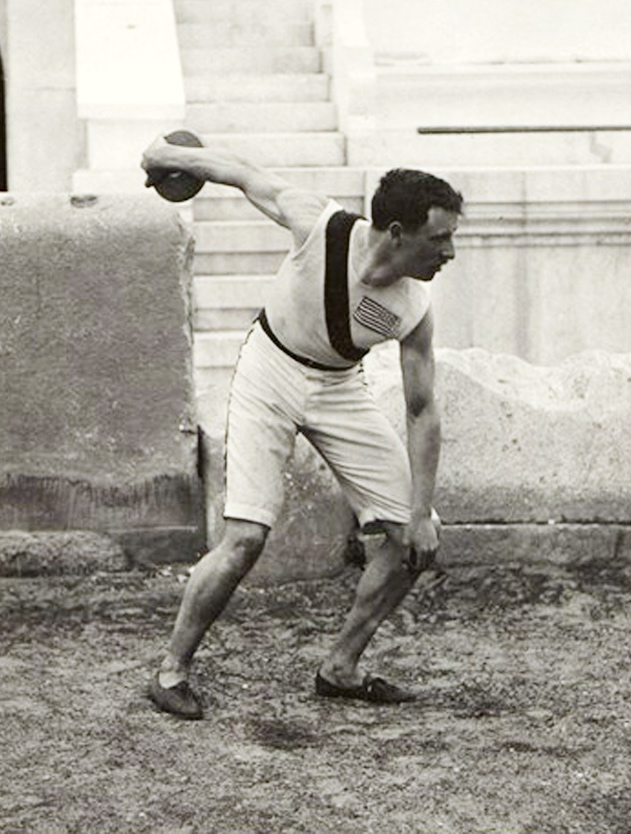
Robert Garrett

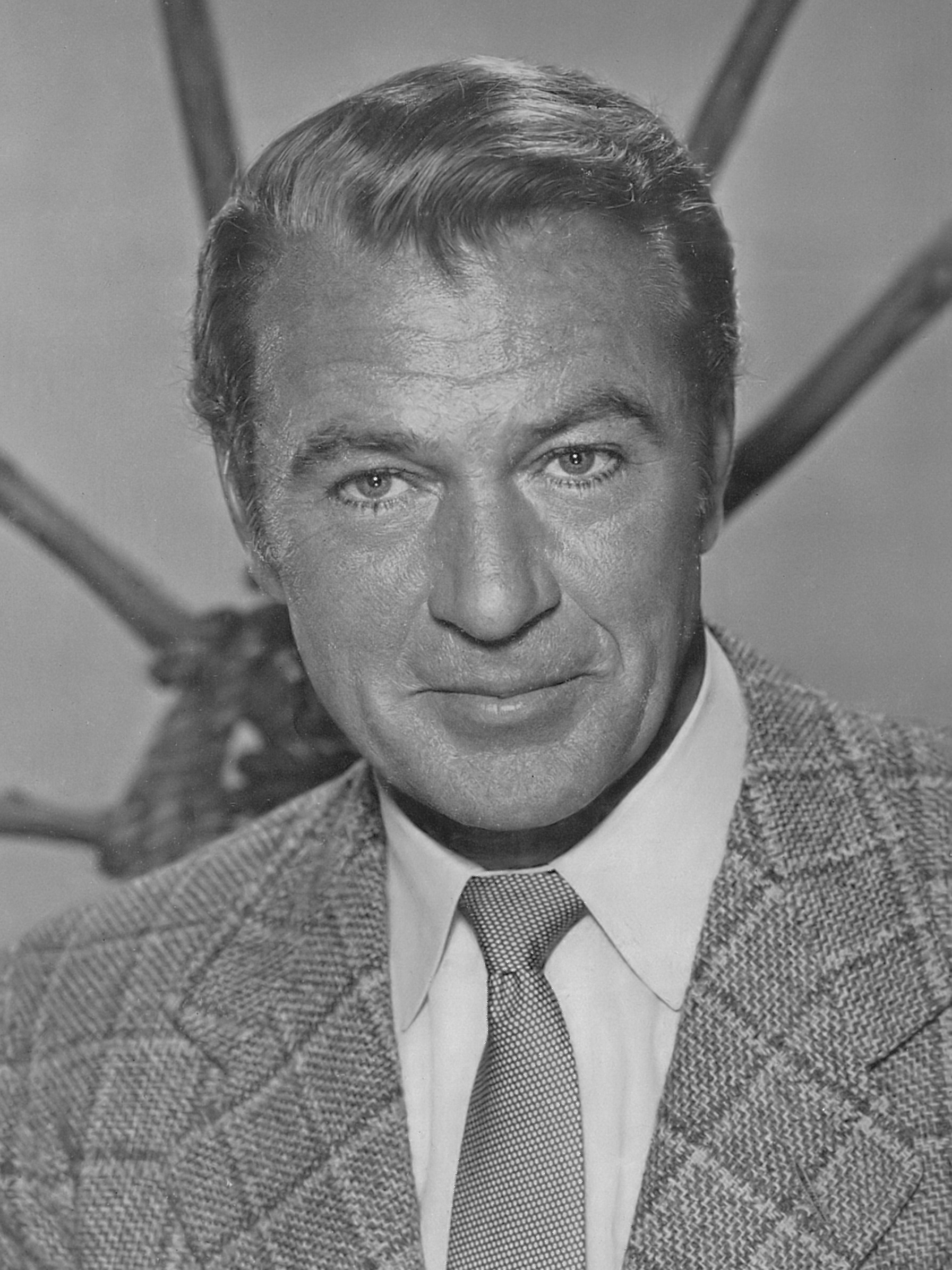
Gary Cooper

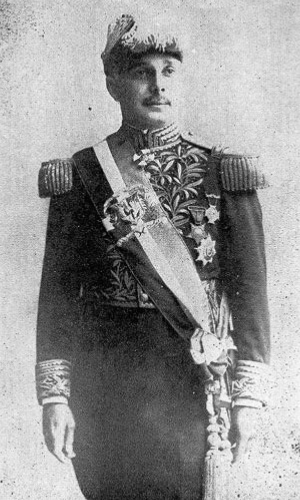
Rafael Trujillo

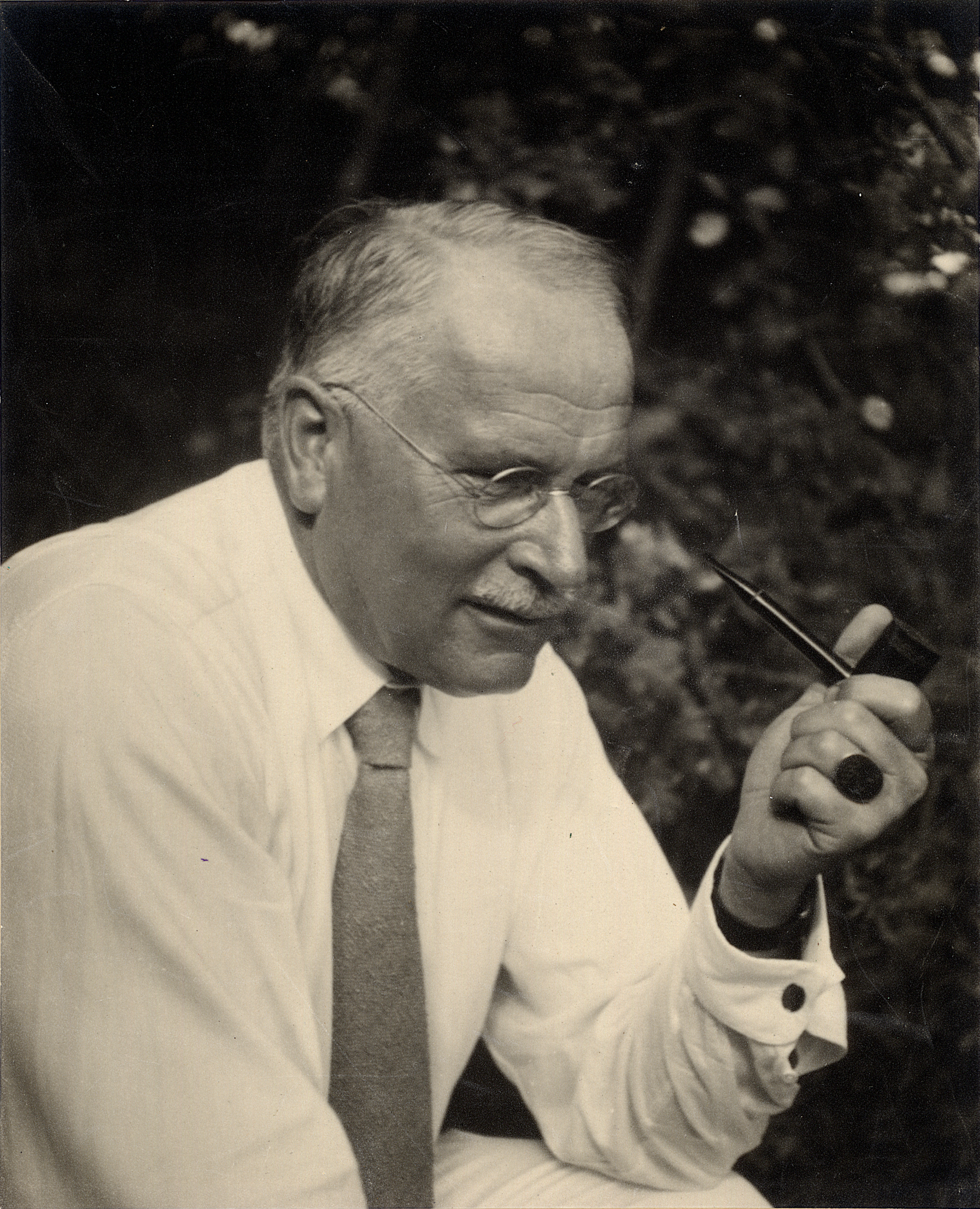
Carl Jung

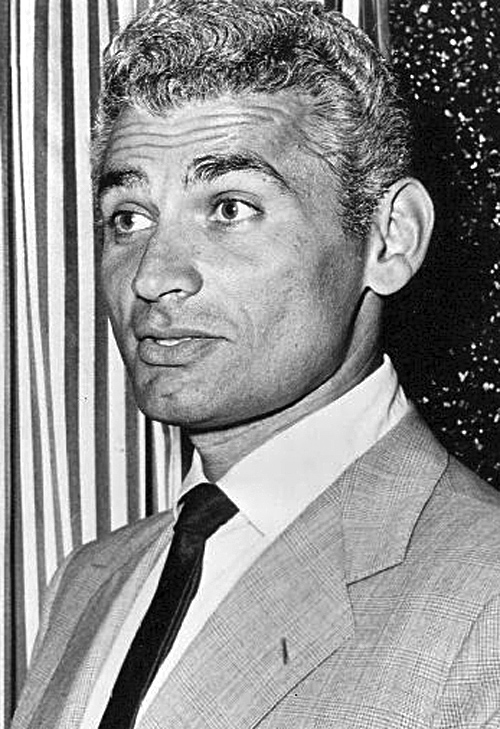
Jeff Chandler

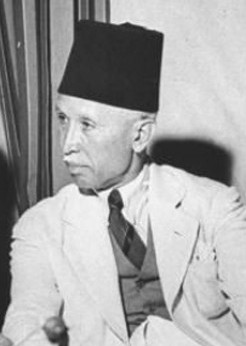
Nasuhi al-Bukhari

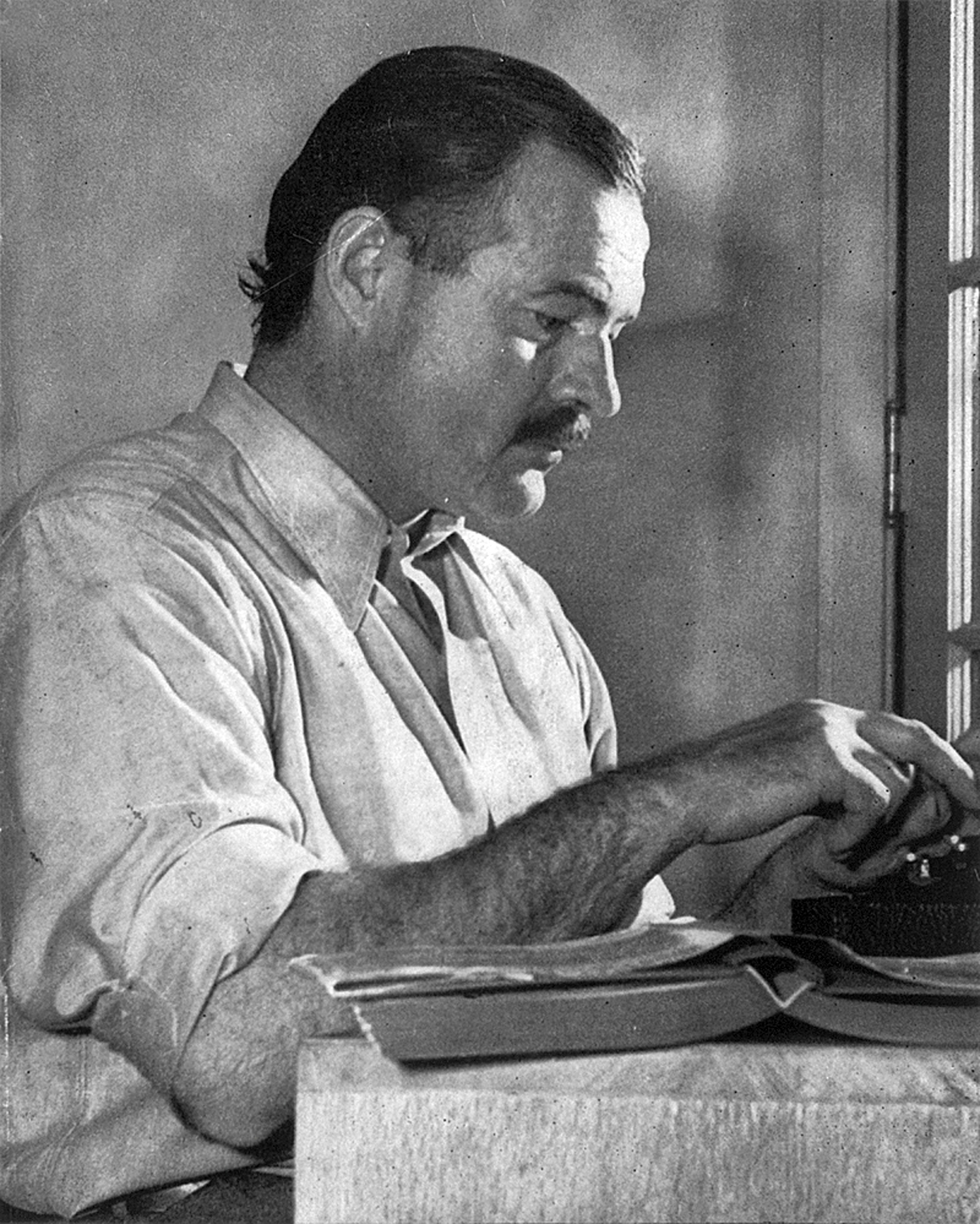
Ernest Hemingway

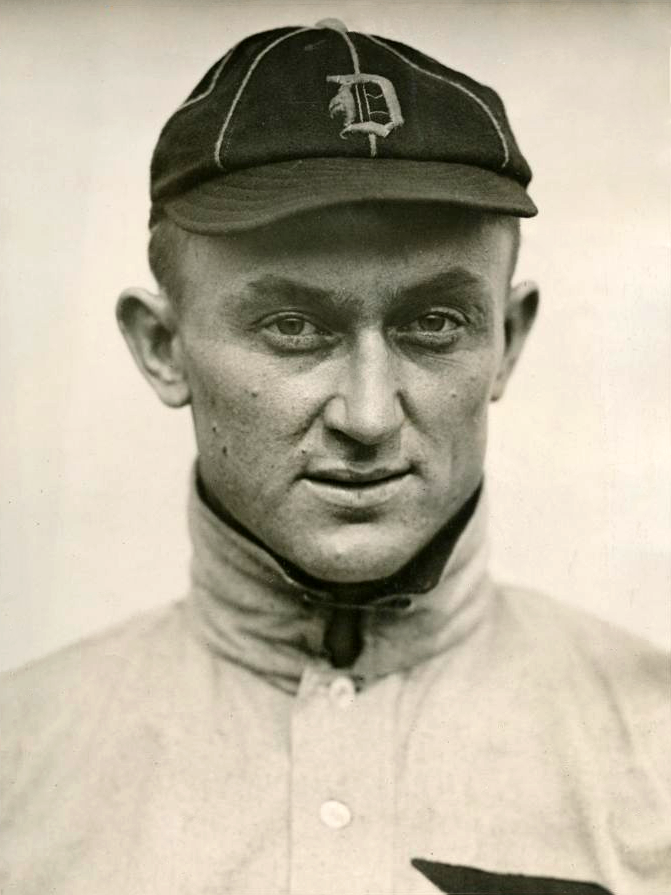
Ty Cobb

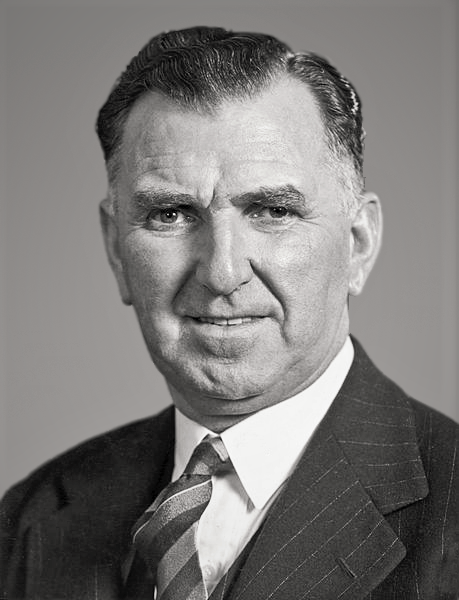
Sir Sidney Holland

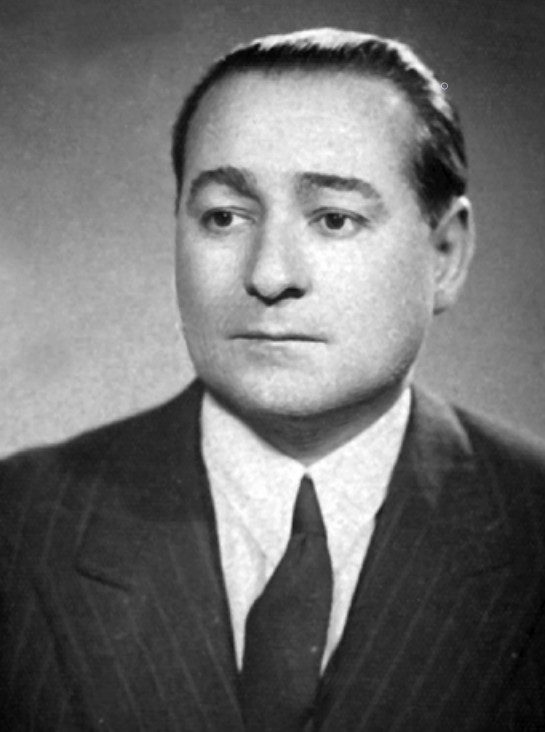
Adnan Menderes

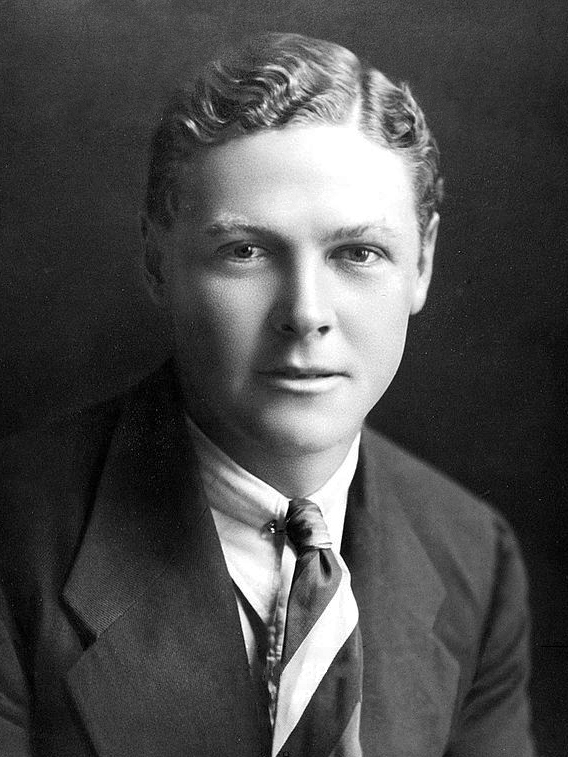
Percy Chapman

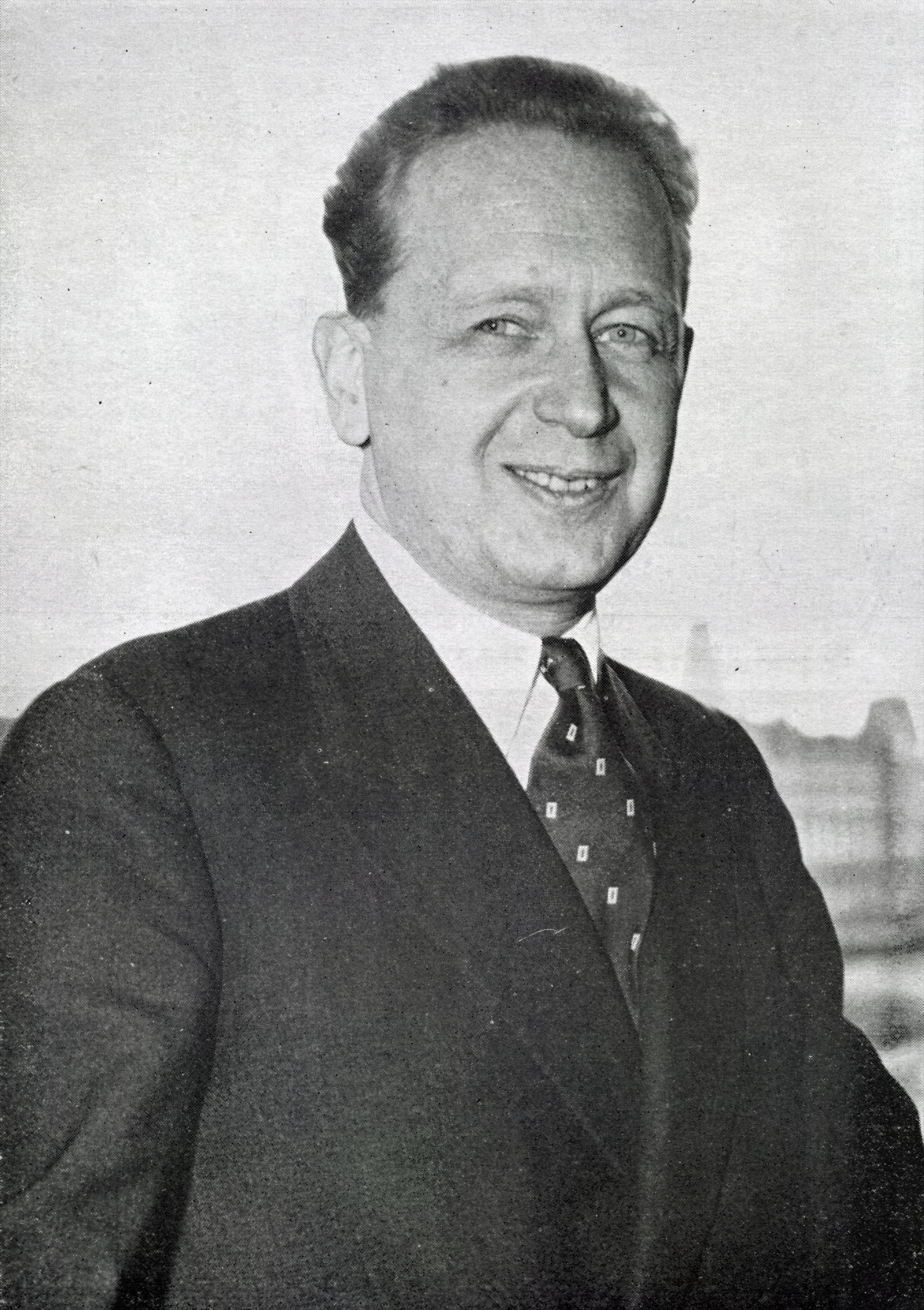
Dag Hammarskjöld

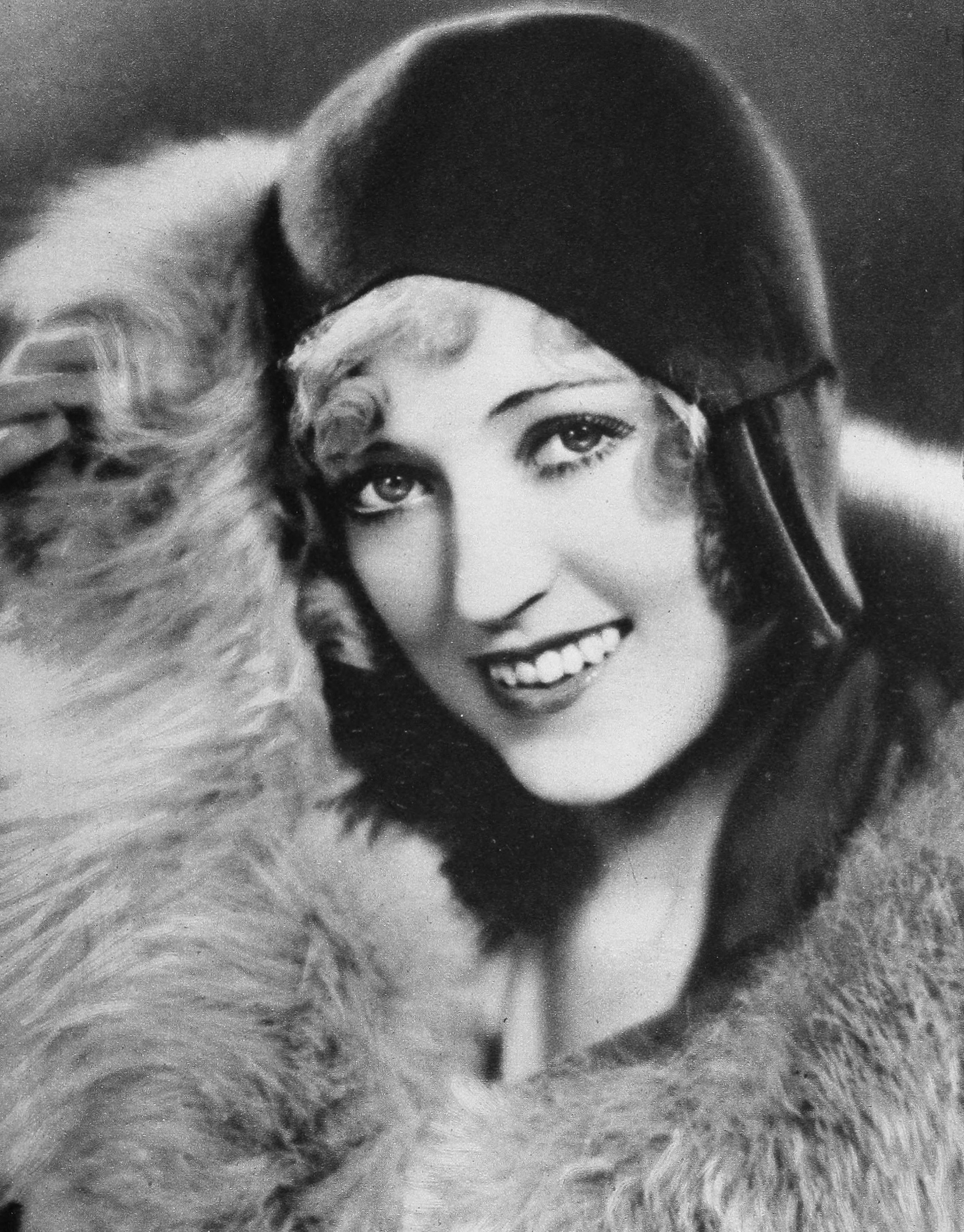
Marion Davies

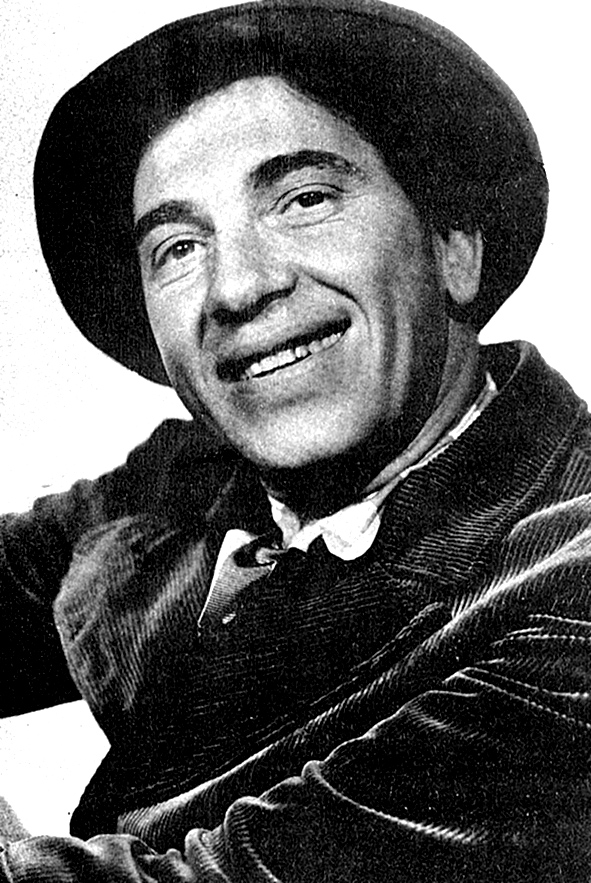
Chico Marx

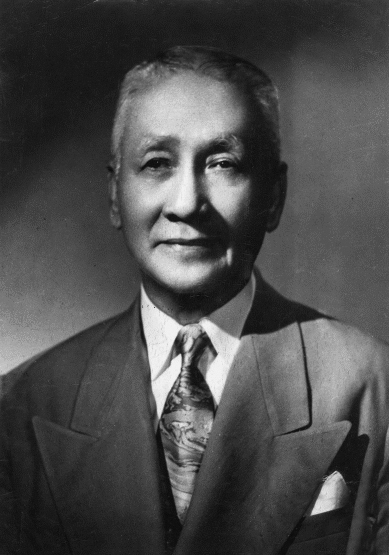
Sergio Osmeña

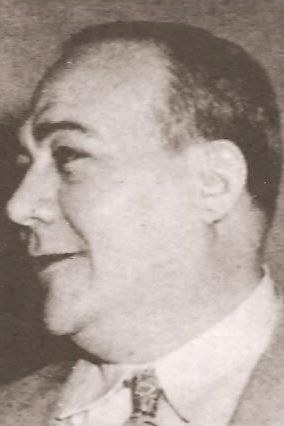
Anselmo Alliegro y Milá

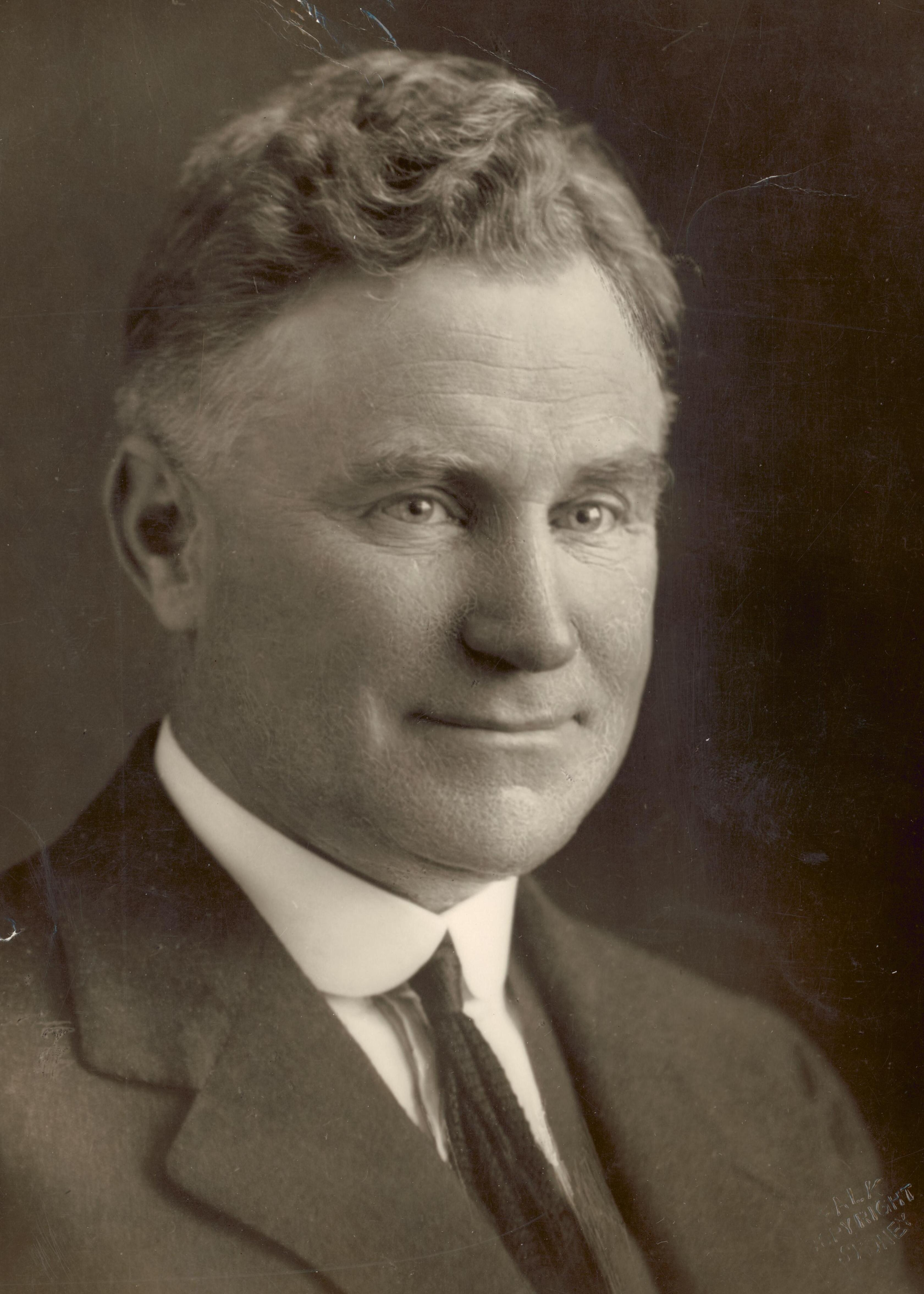
Sir Earle Page

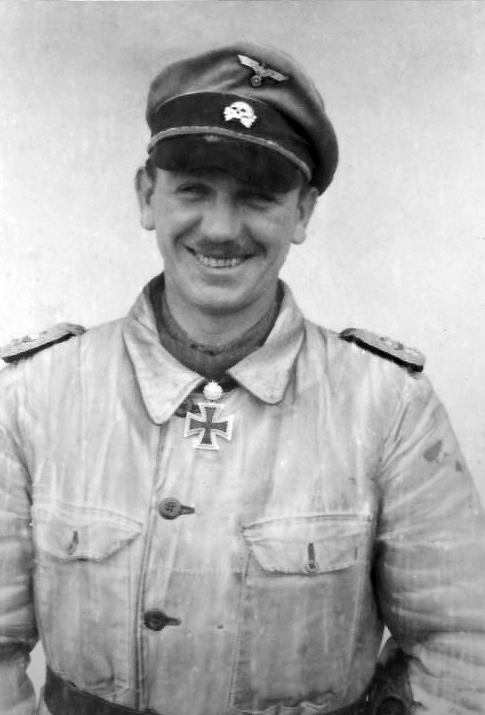
Kurt Meyer

=== January ===
- January 4
  - Barry Fitzgerald, Irish actor (b. 1888)
  - Erwin Schrödinger, Austrian physicist, Nobel Prize laureate (b. 1887)
- January 8 – František Flos, Czech novelist (b. 1864)
- January 9 – Emily Greene Balch, American writer and pacifist, recipient of the Nobel Peace Prize (b. 1867)
- January 10 – Dashiell Hammett, American writer (b. 1894)
- January 13
  - Nino Marchesini, Italian actor (b. 1895)
  - Blanche Ring, American singer and actress (b. 1871)
- January 17 – Patrice Lumumba, 1st Prime Minister of the Democratic Republic of the Congo (b. 1925)
- January 18 – Thomas Anthony Dooley III, physician (b. 1927)
- January 21
  - Blaise Cendrars, Swiss writer (b. 1887)
  - John J. Becker, American composer and pianist (b. 1886)
- January 24 – Alfred Carlton Gilbert, American swimmer and inventor (b. 1884)
- January 29 – Jesse Wallace, American naval officer, 29th Governor of American Samoa (b. 1899)
- January 30 – Dorothy Thompson, American journalist (b. 1893)

=== February ===
- February 3
  - William Morrison, 1st Viscount Dunrossil, Australian Governor-General (b. 1893)
  - Anna May Wong, American actress (b. 1905)
- February 4
  - Hazel Heald, American writer (b. 1896)
  - Sir Philip Game, British army officer, colonial governor and police officer (b. 1876)
- February 6 – Lawrence Dundas, 2nd Marquess of Zetland, British politician (b. 1876)
- February 7 – William Duncan, American actor (b. 1879)
- February 9 – Carlos Luz, Brazilian politician, 19th President of Brazil (b. 1894)
- February 12 – Richmond K. Turner, American admiral (b. 1885)
- February 13 – Arthur Ripley, American film director (b. 1897)
- February 15 – Laurence Owen, American figure skater (b. 1944)
- February 16 – Dazzy Vance, American baseball player (Brooklyn Dodgers) and a member of the MLB Hall of Fame (b. 1891)
- February 17
  - Horatio Berney-Filkin, British army general (b. 1892)
  - Nita Naldi, American actress (b. 1894)
- February 20 – Percy Grainger, Australian composer (b. 1882)
- February 22
  - George de Cuevas, Chilean-American ballet impresario and choreographer (b. 1885)
  - Nick LaRocca, American jazz musician (b. 1889)
- February 25 – Sebastiano Visconti Prasca, Italian general (b. 1883)
- February 26
  - Uberto De Morpurgo, Italian tennis player (b. 1896)
  - King Mohammed V of Morocco (b. 1909)
- February 28 – Aaron S. Merrill, American admiral (b. 1890)

=== March ===
- March 3
  - Azizul Haq, Bengali Islamic scholar (b. 1903)
  - Paul Wittgenstein, Austrian-born pianist (b. 1887)
- March 6 – George Formby, British singer, comedian and actor (b. 1904)
- March 8
  - Sir Thomas Beecham, English conductor (b. 1879)
  - Gala Galaction, Romanian writer (b. 1879)
- March 12
  - Victor d'Arcy, British Olympic athlete (b. 1887)
  - Belinda Lee, English actress (b. 1935)
- March 17 – Susanna M. Salter, first woman mayor in the United States (b. 1860)
- March 22 – Nikolai Massalitinov, Soviet-born Bulgarian actor (b. 1880)
- March 23 – Valentin Bondarenko, Russian cosmonaut (b. 1937)
- March 25 – Arthur Drewry, English administrator, 5th President of FIFA (b. 1891)
- March 26 – Carlos Duarte Costa, Brazilian Roman Catholic archbishop and saint, founder of the Brazilian Catholic Apostolic Church (b. 1888)

=== April ===
- April 2 – Wallingford Riegger, American music composer (b. 1885)
- April 3 – Eliseo Mouriño, Argentine footballer (b. 1927)
- April 6 – Jules Bordet, Belgian immunologist and microbiologist, recipient of the Nobel Prize in Physiology or Medicine (b. 1870)
- April 7
  - Vanessa Bell, English artist and interior designer (b. 1879)
  - Jesús Guridi, Spanish Basque composer (b. 1886)
- April 9 – Zog I of Albania, Albanian political leader, 11th Prime Minister of Albania, 7th President of Albania and King of Albania (b. 1895)
- April 11 – Padma Shumsher Jang Bahadur Rana, 16th Prime Minister of Nepal (b. 1882)
- April 12
  - Mbarek Bekkay, 1st Prime Minister of Morocco (b. 1907)
  - Aziz Ezzat Pasha, Egyptian politician (b. 1869)
- April 19 – Manuel Quiroga, Spanish violinist (b. 1892)
- April 21 – James Melton, American tenor (b. 1904)
- April 24 – Lee Moran, American actor (b. 1888)
- April 25
  - Robert Garrett, American Olympic athlete (b. 1875)
  - George Melford, American actor (b. 1877)
- April 27
  - Roy Del Ruth, American film director (b. 1893)
  - Minoru Sasaki, Japanese general (b. 1893)
- April 30
  - Dickie Dale, English motorcycle road racer (b. 1927)
  - Jessie Redmon Fauset, American editor, writer and educator (b. 1882)

=== May ===
- May 3
  - Lajos Dinnyés, 41st Prime Minister of Hungary (b. 1901)
  - Maurice Merleau-Ponty, French phenomenological philosopher (b. 1908)
- May 6 – Lucian Blaga, Romanian poet and philosopher (b. 1895)
- May 13 – Gary Cooper, American actor (b. 1901)
- May 14 – Albert Sévigny, Canadian politician (b. 1881)
- May 16 – George A. Malcolm, American jurist and educator (b. 1881)
- May 19 – Nathalie Demassieux, French chemist and academic (b. 1884)
- May 23 – Joan Davis, American actress (b. 1912)
- May 29 – Uuno Klami, Finnish composer (b. 1900)
- May 30 – Rafael Trujillo, Dominican politician and soldier, 2-time President of the Dominican Republic (b. 1891)

=== June ===
- June – Constantin Constantinescu-Claps, Romanian general (b. 1884)
- June 2 – George S. Kaufman, American playwright (b. 1889)
- June 4 – William Astbury, English physicist and molecular biologist (b. 1898)
- June 6 – Carl Jung, Swiss psychiatrist (b. 1875)
- June 9
  - Kateryna Bilokur, Ukrainian folk artist (b. 1900)
  - Camille Guérin, French bacteriologist and immunologist (b. 1872)
- June 14 – Eddie Polo, Austrian-American actor (b. 1875)
- June 16 – Marcel Junod, Swiss physician (b. 1904)
- June 17 – Jeff Chandler, American actor (b. 1918)
- June 18 – Eddie Gaedel, American with dwarfism (b. 1925)
- June 19 – Sir Richard Turner, Canadian general, Victoria Cross recipient (b. 1871)
- June 22 – Queen Maria of Yugoslavia (b. 1900)
- June 23 – Nicolai Malko, Soviet conductor (b. 1883)
- June 24 – George Washington Vanderbilt III, American philanthropist (b. 1914)
- June 25 – John Alexander Douglas McCurdy, Lieutenant Governor of Nova Scotia and pilot (b. 1886)
- June 26 – Kenneth Fearing, American poet and novelist (b. 1902)
- June 27
  - Paul Guilfoyle, American actor (b. 1902)
  - Mukhtar Auezov, Kazakh writer (b. 1897)
- June 30 – Lee de Forest, American inventor (b. 1873)

=== July ===
- July 1
  - Nasuhi al-Bukhari, Syrian soldier and politician, 12th Prime Minister of Syria (b. 1881)
  - Louis-Ferdinand Céline, French writer (b. 1894)
- July 2 – Ernest Hemingway, American writer, Nobel Prize laureate (suicide) (b. 1899)
- July 4 – Franklyn Farnum, American actor (b. 1878)
- July 6 – Konstantinos Logothetopoulos, Prime Minister of Greece (b. 1878)
- July 9 – Whittaker Chambers, American spy and witness in Hiss case
- July 17 – Ty Cobb, American baseball player and a member of the Baseball Hall of Fame (b. 1886)
- July 23
  - Esther Dale, American actress (b. 1885)
  - Valentine Davies, American screenwriter (b. 1905)
  - Princess Teru of Japan (b. 1925)
- July 28 – Harry Gribbon, American actor of silent films (b. 1885)
- July 30 – Sediqeh Dowlatabadi, Persian feminist, women's rights activist and journalist (b. 1882)

=== August ===
- August 1 – Domingo Pérez Cáceres, Spanish Roman Catholic priest and saint (b. 1892)
- August 3 – Zoltán Tildy, 39th Prime Minister of Hungary (b. 1889)
- August 4 – Maurice Tourneur, French film director (b. 1873)
- August 5 – Sir Sidney Holland, New Zealand politician, 25th Prime Minister of New Zealand (b. 1893)
- August 8 – Mei Lanfang, Beijing opera star (b. 1894)
- August 9 – Walter Bedell Smith, American general and diplomat (b. 1895)
- August 14
  - Henri Breuil, French priest, archaeologist, anthropologist and ethnologist (b. 1877)
  - Clark Ashton Smith, American writer and sculptor (b. 1893)
- August 15 – Otto Ruge, Norwegian general (b. 1882)
- August 20 – Percy Williams Bridgman, American physicist, Nobel Prize laureate (b. 1882)
- August 23
  - Gotthard Sachsenberg, German World War I naval aviator and fighter ace (b. 1891)
  - Beals Wright, American tennis player (b. 1879)
- August 26
  - Howard P. Robertson, American physicist (b. 1903)
  - Gail Russell, American actress (b. 1924)
- August 28 – Vera Michelena, American actress, singer, and dancer (b. 1885)
- August 30
  - Charles Coburn, American actor (b. 1877)
  - Cristóbal de Losada y Puga, Peruvian mathematician and mining engineer (b. 1894)

=== September ===
- September 1 – Eero Saarinen, Finnish architect (b. 1910)
- September 3 – Richard Mason, British explorer (b. 1934)
- September 4 – Charles D.B. King, President of Liberia from 1920 to 1930 (b. 1875)
- September 5 – Lewis Akeley, American academic (b. 1861)
- September 7 – Pieter Gerbrandy, Prime Minister of the Netherlands 1940 to 1945 (b. 1885)
- September 16
  - Percy Chapman, English cricketer (b. 1900)
  - Hasan Fehmi, Turkish politician (b. 1879)
- September 17
  - Miguel Gómez Bao, Spanish-born Argentine actor (b. 1894)
  - Adnan Menderes, Turkish statesman, 9th Prime Minister of Turkey (executed) (b. 1899)
- September 18
  - Dag Hammarskjöld, Swedish diplomat, politician and author, 2nd Secretary General of the United Nations, recipient of the Nobel Peace Prize (b. 1905)
- September 21 – Georgia Ann Robinson, community worker and first African American woman to be appointed a Los Angeles police officer (b. 1879)
- September 22 – Marion Davies, American actress (b. 1897)
- September 23 – Elmer Diktonius, Finnish poet and composer (b. 1896)
- September 24 – Sumner Welles, American diplomat (b. 1892)
- September 25 – Frank Fay, American vaudeville comedian and film and stage actor (b. 1891)
- September 26
  - Robert L. Eichelberger, American general (b. 1886)
  - Juanita Hansen, American actress (b. 1895)
- September 27 – H.D. (Hilda Doolittle), American poet and novelist (b. 1886)

=== October ===
- October 1
  - Donald Cook, American actor (b. 1901)
  - William Reid Dick, Scottish sculptor (b. 1878)
- October 2 – Essington Lewis, Australian industrialist (b. 1881)
- October 4 – Max Weber, Polish-American artist (b. 1881)
- October 6 – J. Reuben Clark, American politician and Mormon leader (b. 1871)
- October 11 – Chico Marx, American comedian (b. 1887)
- October 13
  - Louis Rwagasore, 2nd Prime Minister of Burundi (assassinated) (b. 1932)
  - Maya Deren, Russian-born American filmmaker (b. 1917)
  - Zoltán Korda, Hungarian screenwriter and director (b. 1895)
  - Dun Karm Psaila, Maltese writer (b. 1871)
- October 14
  - Paul Ramadier, French politician, 63rd Prime Minister of France (b. 1888)
  - Harriet Shaw Weaver, English political activist (b. 1876)
- October 18 – Tsuru Aoki, Japanese actress (b. 1892)
- October 19
  - Şemsettin Günaltay, Turkish historian and politician, 8th Prime Minister of Turkey (b. 1883)
  - Sergio Osmeña, Filipino politician, 4th President of the Philippines (b. 1878)
- October 21 – Karl Korsch, German Marxist theoretician (b. 1886)
- October 22
  - Joseph M. Schenck, Russian-born film studio executive (b. 1876)
  - Aloys Van de Vyvere, 25th Prime Minister of Belgium (b. 1871)
- October 26 – Milan Stojadinović, 12th Prime Minister of Yugoslavia (b. 1888)
- October 30 – Luigi Einaudi, Italian economist and politician, 2nd President of Italy (b. 1874)
- October 31 – Augustus John, Welsh painter (b. 1878)

=== November ===
- November 1
  - Mordecai Ham, American evangelist (b. 1877)
  - Princess Beatrice of Bourbon, member of the deposed Bourbon royal family of France and Spain (b. 1874)
- November 2
  - James Thurber, American humorist (b. 1894)
  - Salman bin Hamad Al Khalifa I, 12th Hakim of Bahrain (b. 1894)
- November 3 – Thomas Flynn, British Roman Catholic prelate and reverend (b. 1880)
- November 9 – Ferdinand Bie, Norwegian Olympic athlete (b. 1888)
- November 15
  - Elsie Ferguson, American actress (b. 1883)
  - Johanna Westerdijk, Dutch plant pathologist (b. 1883)
- November 16 – Sam Rayburn, Speaker of the United States House of Representatives (b. 1882)
- November 19 – Michael Rockefeller, son of Nelson Rockefeller (disappeared on date) (born 1938)
- November 22 – Anselmo Alliegro y Milá, Cuban politician, 3rd Prime Minister of Cuba, leader of World War II (b. 1899)
- November 24 – Ruth Chatterton, American actress, novelist and aviator (b. 1892)
- November 25 – Adelina de Lara, British composer (b. 1872)
- November 30 – Anna Gould, American heiress and socialite, daughter of financier Jay Gould (b. 1875)

=== December ===
- December 2 – Dulcie Mary Pillers, English medical illustrator (b. 1891)
- December 3 – Pat O'Hara Wood, Australian tennis player (b. 1891)
- December 6 – Frantz Fanon, Martiniquais philosopher (b. 1925)
- December 7 – Herbert Pitman, British sailor, third officer of the RMS Titanic (b. 1877)
- December 10 – Elwyn Welch, New Zealand farmer, ornithologist, conservationist and Open Brethren missionary (b. 1925)
- December 13 – Anna Mary Robertson Moses aka Grandma Moses, American naïve painter (b. 1860)
- December 15 – Gioacchino Failla, Italian-born American physicist (b. 1891)
- December 20
  - Moss Hart, American dramatist (b. 1904)
  - Sir Earle Page, Australian politician, 11th Prime Minister of Australia (b. 1880)
- December 22 – Dick Elliott, American actor (b. 1886)
- December 23 – Kurt Meyer, German Generalmajor der Waffen-SS and war criminal (b. 1910)
- December 25 – Otto Loewi, German-born pharmacologist, recipient of the Nobel Prize in Physiology or Medicine (b. 1873)
- December 27 – Bernard McConville, American screenwriter (b. 1887)
- December 28 – Edith Wilson, First Lady of the United States from 1915 to 1921 (b. 1872)
- December 29 – Anton Flettner, German aviation engineer and inventor (b. 1885)

== Nobel Prizes ==

- Physics – Robert Hofstadter, Rudolf Mössbauer
- Chemistry – Melvin Calvin
- Physiology or Medicine – Georg von Békésy
- Literature – Ivo Andrić
- Peace – Dag Hammarskjöld (posthumously)

== See also ==
- Upside down year
