= Amaru Marka Wasi =

Archaeological site in Peru

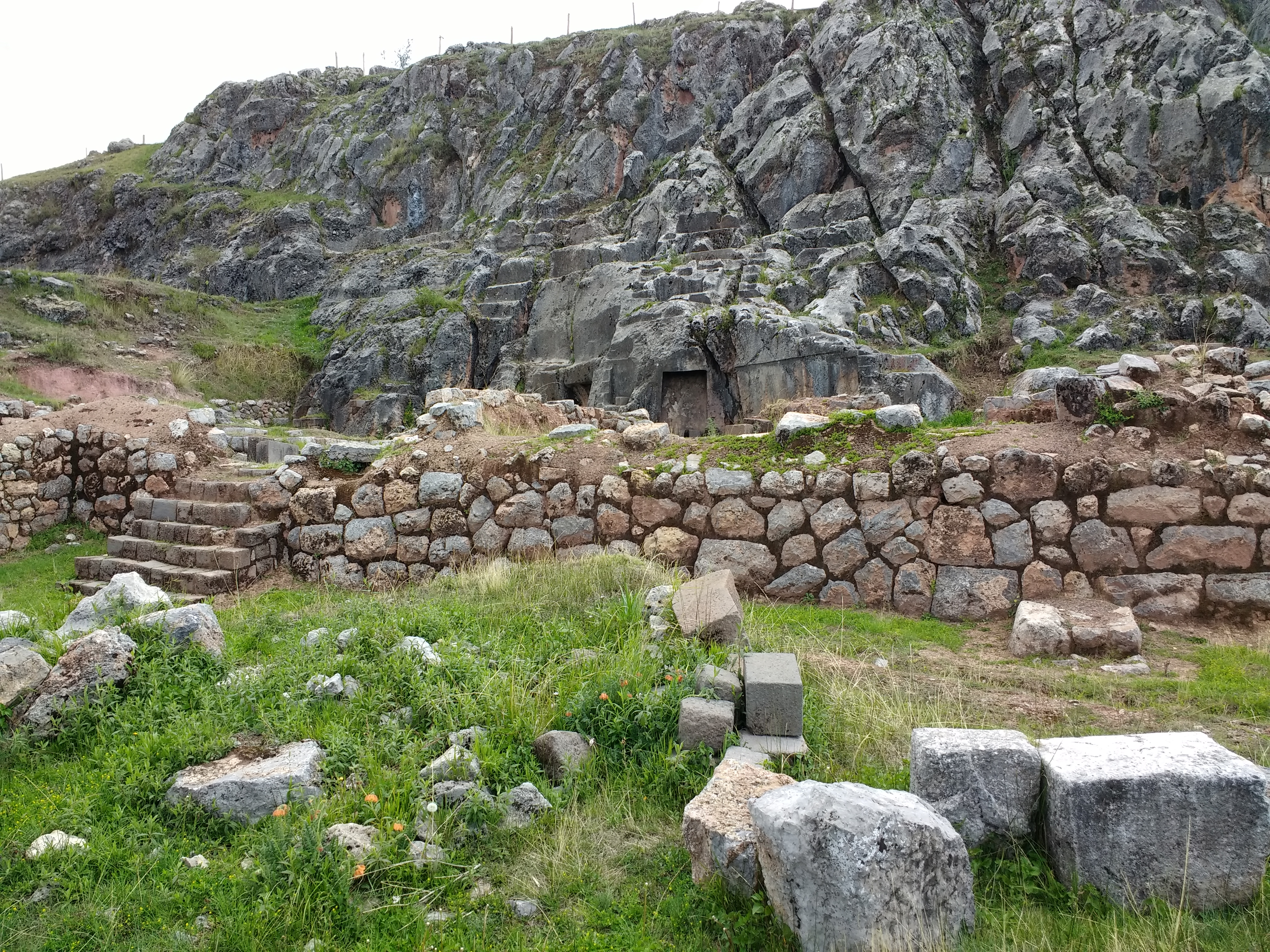
- Partial view of the site.

- Location within Peru
- 13°30′20.30″S 71°57′52.91″W
- Type: Palace
- Cultures: Inca
- Location: Peru; Cusco Province, Cusco

Amaru Marka Wasi, Amarumarcahuasi or Amaromarcaguaci (possibly from Quechua amaru snake, marka village, wasi house; hispanicized and mixed spellings, Amarumarkahuasi, Amaru Markahuasi), also known as Salunniyuq (Salonniyoq, Salonniyuq), Salunpunku (Salonpunku), Laqu, Laq'u (Lacco, Lago), or Templo de la Luna (Temple of the Moon) is an archaeological site in Peru. It is situated in the Cusco Region, Cusco Province, Cusco District, north of the city of Cusco. It lies east of the archaeological site of Sacsayhuamán and south of Tambomachay and Puka Pukara, near Qenko.

This site named Amaru Marka Wasi was possibly the former residence of Amaru Yupanqui, also known as Amaro Tupac, the eldest son of Pachakutiq Inka Yupanki.

== See also ==
- Qullqanpata
