= Inti Raymi =

Incan religious festival

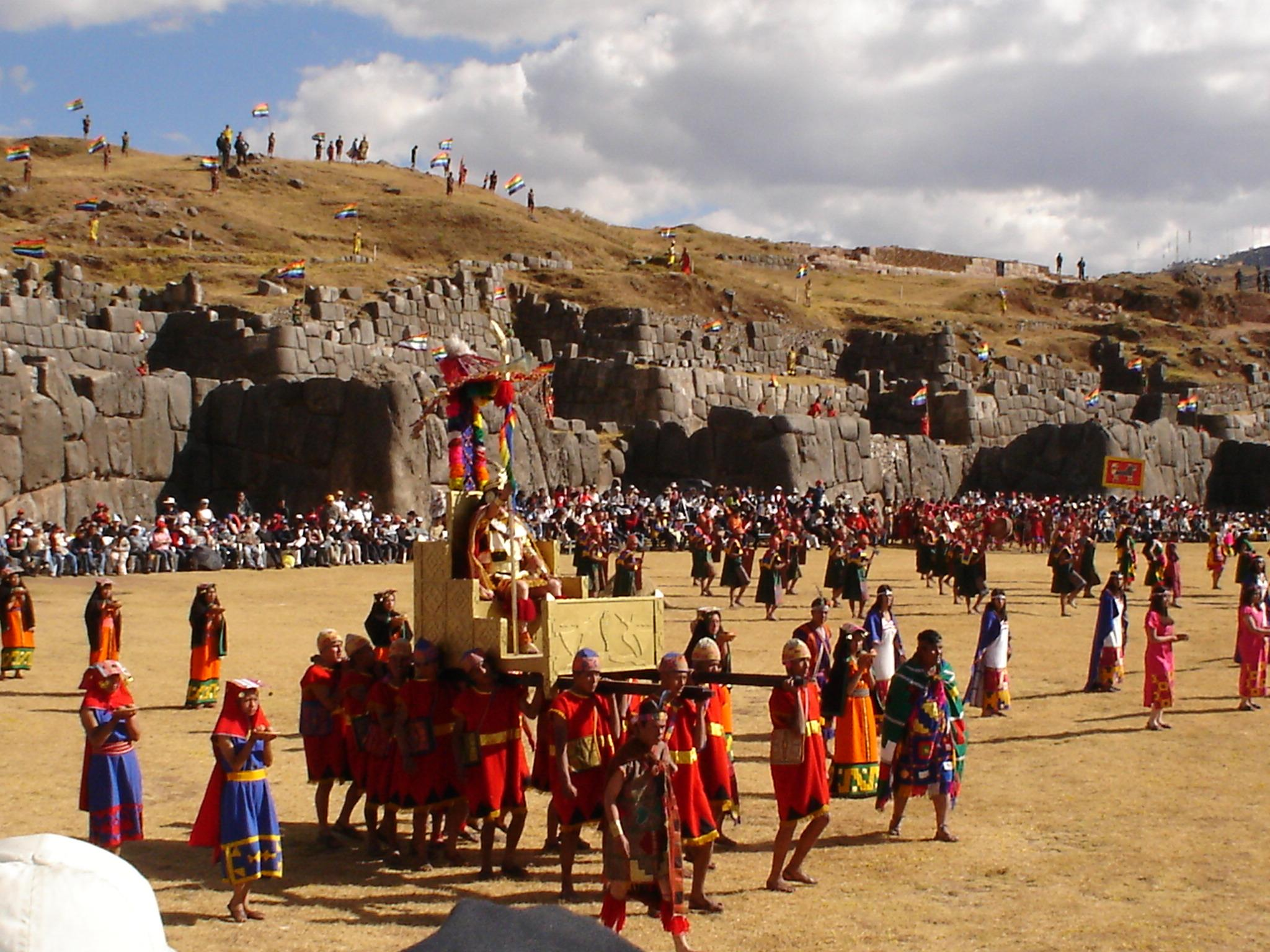
- Modern Inti Raymi at Sacsayhuamán, Peru
- Official name: Inti Raymi
- Also called: Festival of the Sun, Sun Festival
- Observed by: Indigenous communities of Peru, Ecuador and Northern Argentina
- Type: Cultural
- Significance: In honor of the Apu Inti or Sun God; Beginning of a new Inca year
- Celebrations: Reenactment of Inca rituals, feasting, music, dance
- Date: June 21 (in Argentina); June 22 (in Ecuador); June 24 (in Peru)
- Frequency: Annual
- Related to: Inca religion, Winter solstice

Cultural Heritage of Peru
- Official name: Inti Raymi
- Type: Intangible
- Criteria: Festivals and ritual celebrations
- Designated: 3 March 2001; 25 years ago
- Legal basis: Law Nº 27431

The Inti Raymi (Quechua for "Inti festival") is a traditional religious ceremony of the Inca Empire in honor of the god Inti (Quechua for "sun"), the most venerated deity in Inca religion. It was the celebration of the winter solstice (Note: In territories south of the equator, the Gregorian months of June and July are winter months.) – the shortest day of the year in terms of the time between sunrise and sunset – and the Inca New Year, when the hours of light would begin to lengthen again. Celebrated on June 25, the Inti Raymi was the most important festival of the Inca Empire, as described by Inca Garcilaso de la Vega, and took place in the Haukaypata, the main square of Cusco.

Today, the festival is recognized as the second-largest festival in South America and the most important and well-attended celebration of the year in Cusco, attracting thousands of visitors from across Peru, Ecuador, Bolivia and around the world.

== History ==
1940s newsreel about the Inti Raymi festival (in Spanish)

According to chronicler Garcilaso de la Vega, Sapa Inca Pachacuti created the Inti Raymi to celebrate the new year in the Andes of the Southern Hemisphere. The ceremony was also said to symbolize the mythical origin of the Inca people. It lasted for nine days and was filled with colorful dances and processions, as well as animal sacrifices to thank Pachamama and to ensure a good harvest season. The first Inti Raymi was in 1412. The last Inti Raymi with the Inca Emperor's presence was carried out in 1535. After this, the Spanish colonists and their Catholic priests banned the ceremony and other Inca religious practices.

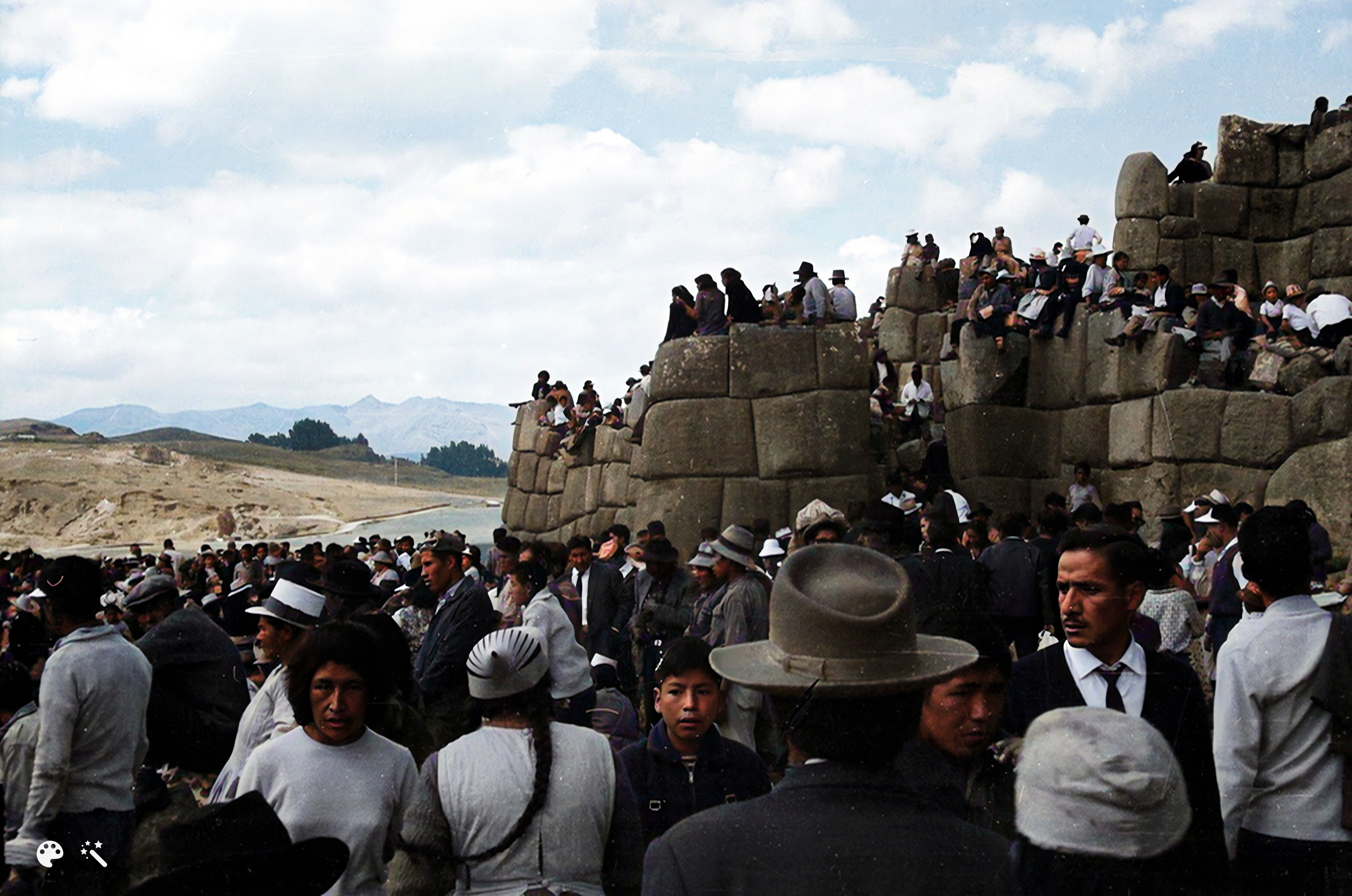
Crowd watching the Inti Raymi celebration in June 1966 from the walls of Sacsayhuamán

In 1944, a historical reconstruction of the Inti Raymi was directed by Faustino Espinoza Navarro and indigenous actors. The first reconstruction was based largely on the chronicles of Garcilaso de la Vega and referred only to the religious ceremony. Since 1944, an annual theatrical representation of the Inti Raymi has been taking place at Saksaywaman on June 24, two kilometers (1.24 miles) from the original site of celebration in central Cusco. It attracts thousands of tourists and local visitors.

Inti Raymi is still celebrated in indigenous cultures throughout the Andes. Celebrations involve music, wearing of colorful costumes (most notable the woven Aya Huma mask), and the sharing of food. In many parts of the Andes though, this celebration has also been connected to the western Catholic festivals of Saint John the Baptist (June 24), which falls a few days after the southern winter solstice (June 21). The celebration today begins at Qorikancha, followed by the Plaza de Armas, and other important sites of the Incan times.

== Modern day re-enactment ==
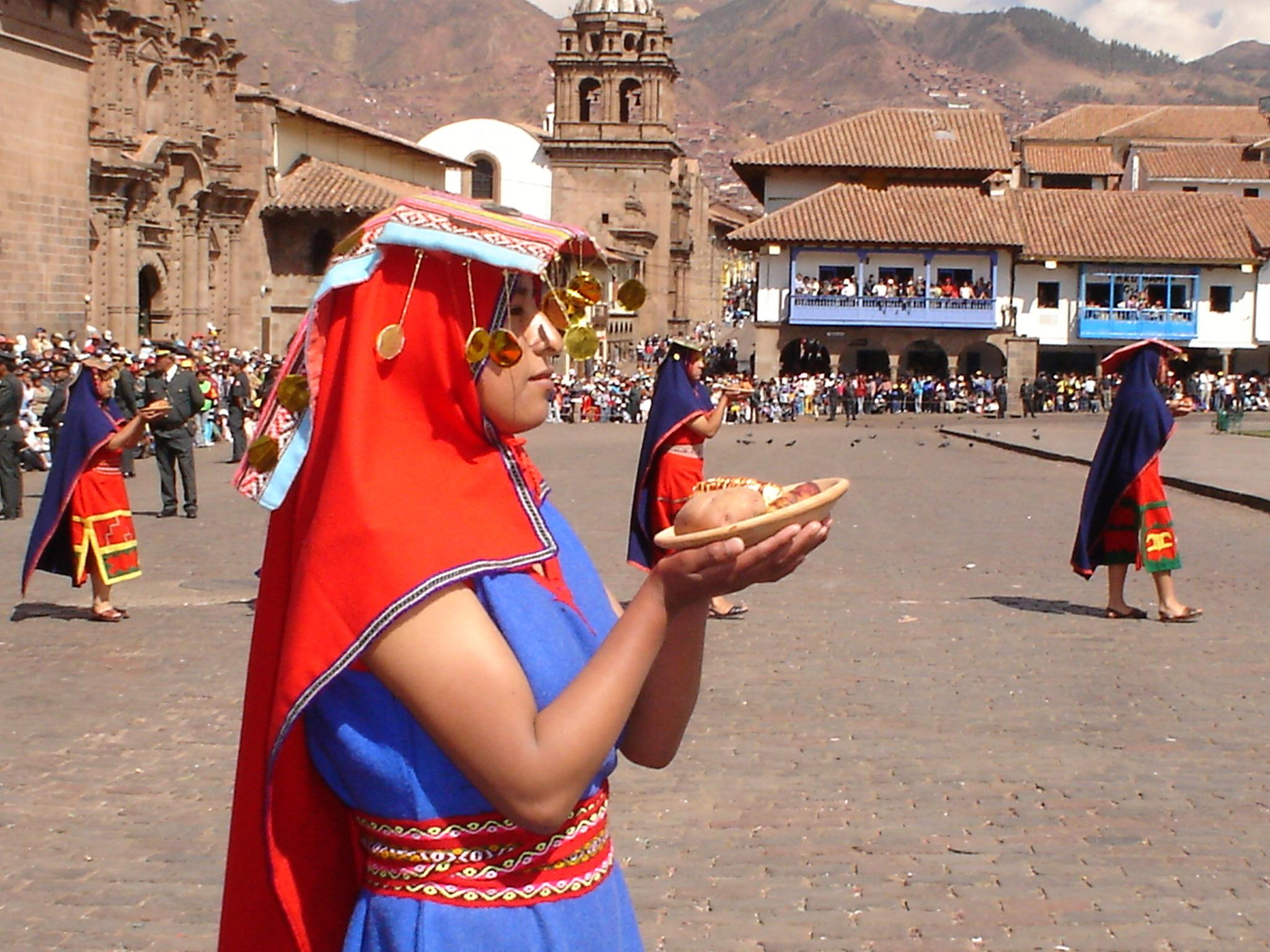
Inti Raymi, Cusco, Huacaypata, 2005

The Inti Raymi is traditionally performed in three historical and natural settings commonly used for staging, where over 800 artists don typical garments and engage in diverse presentations, including dances and performances. These events primarily take place at the temple of Qorikancha, the Archaeological Park of Sacsayhuaman, and the Plaza de Armas (Main Square) of Cusco.

=== Qorikancha ===
The celebration begins in this temple, historically the primary site for sun worship during the Tawantinsuyu. The contemporary ceremony unfolds here before the imperial retinue proceeds along Loreto Street or Inti K'ijllu toward the Plaza de Armas.

=== Plaza de Armas ===
Formerly referred to as Auqaypata or Warrior's Square, this location hosts rituals such as the Coca Rite and the Meeting of the Times, where the Inca meets the city's mayor and members of the City Council, as well as provincial and national leaders, to exchange the khipu representing the three powers: munay (to want), yachay (to know), and llankay (to work). The royal party arrives there from the temple site on the way to the main ceremonial venue.

=== Sacsayhuamán ===
Situated approximately one kilometer from Qolqanpata, an Inca neighborhood, this archaeological site serves as the focal point for the central ceremony, which includes:

- Ceremonial sitting of the Imperial party.
- Report from the 4 Suyos (regions) and Offerings: Qollasuyu, Kuntisuyu, Antisuyu and Chinchaysuyu (today sometimes the report is held in the Plaza de Armas with the offerings in Sacsayhuaman).
- Rite of the Chicha.
- Rite of the Incan Sacred Fire.
- The Llama's sacrifice (Andean camelid) and omens.
- Rite of the Sankhu (holy bread).
- Traditional pre-Hispanic dances of the 4 Suyos.
- Q’ochurikuy (popular worship).

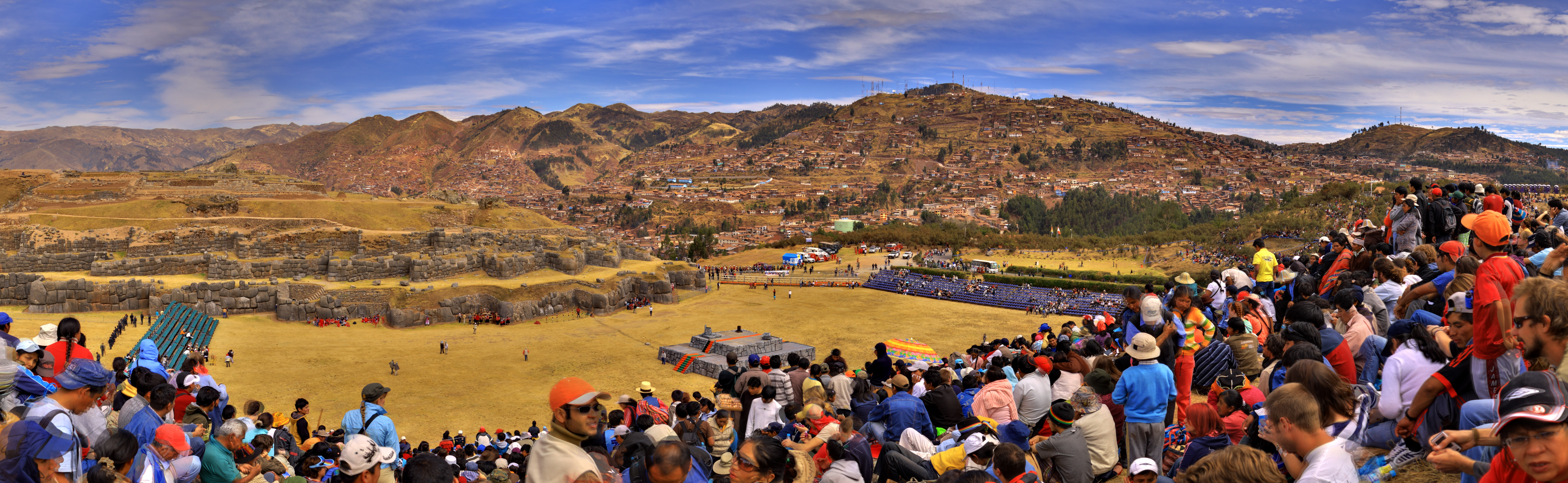
The esplanade of Sacsayhuaman a few minutes before the present-day Inti Raymi celebration

== Gallery ==
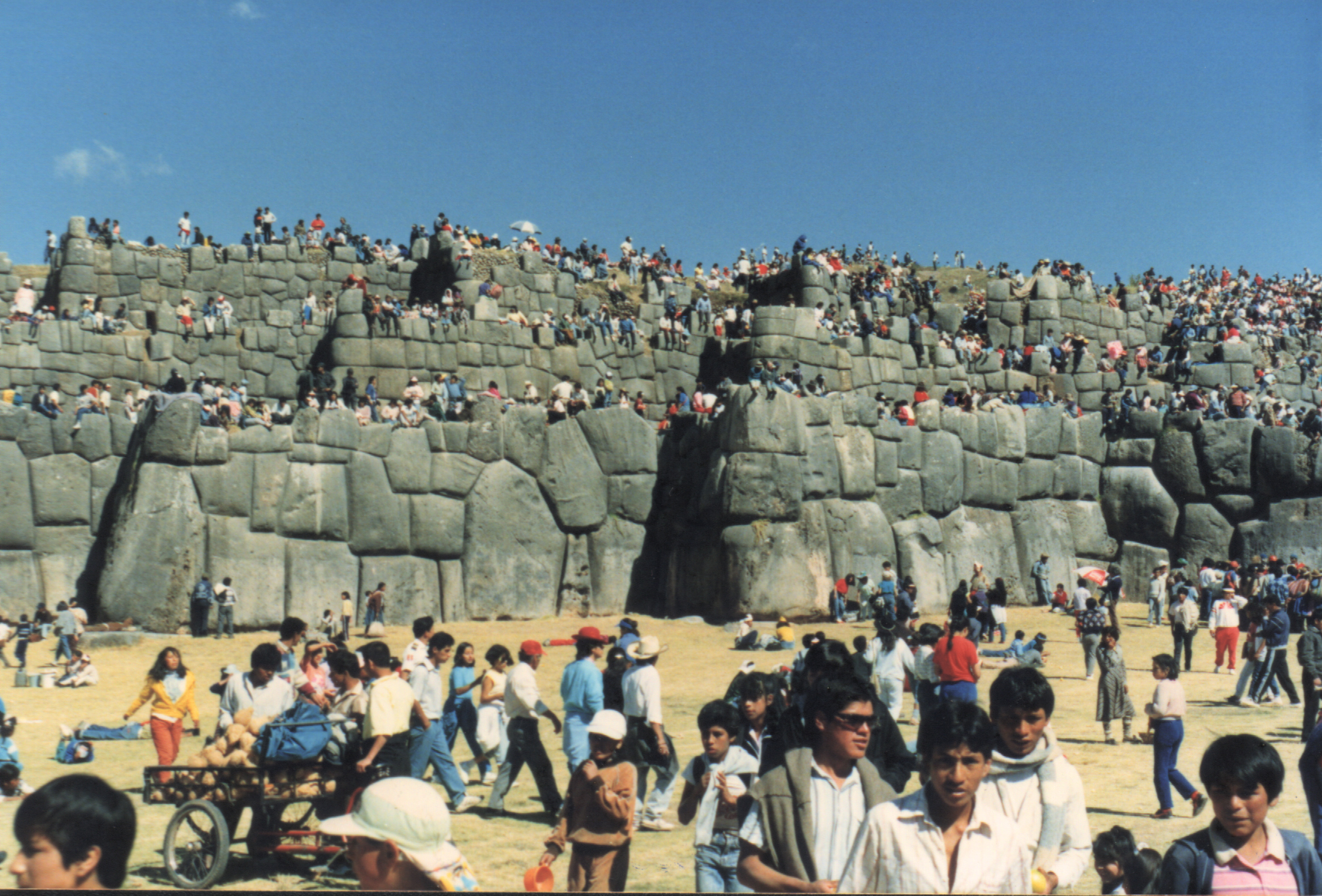
Inti Raymi Festival in Sacsayhuamán in 1991

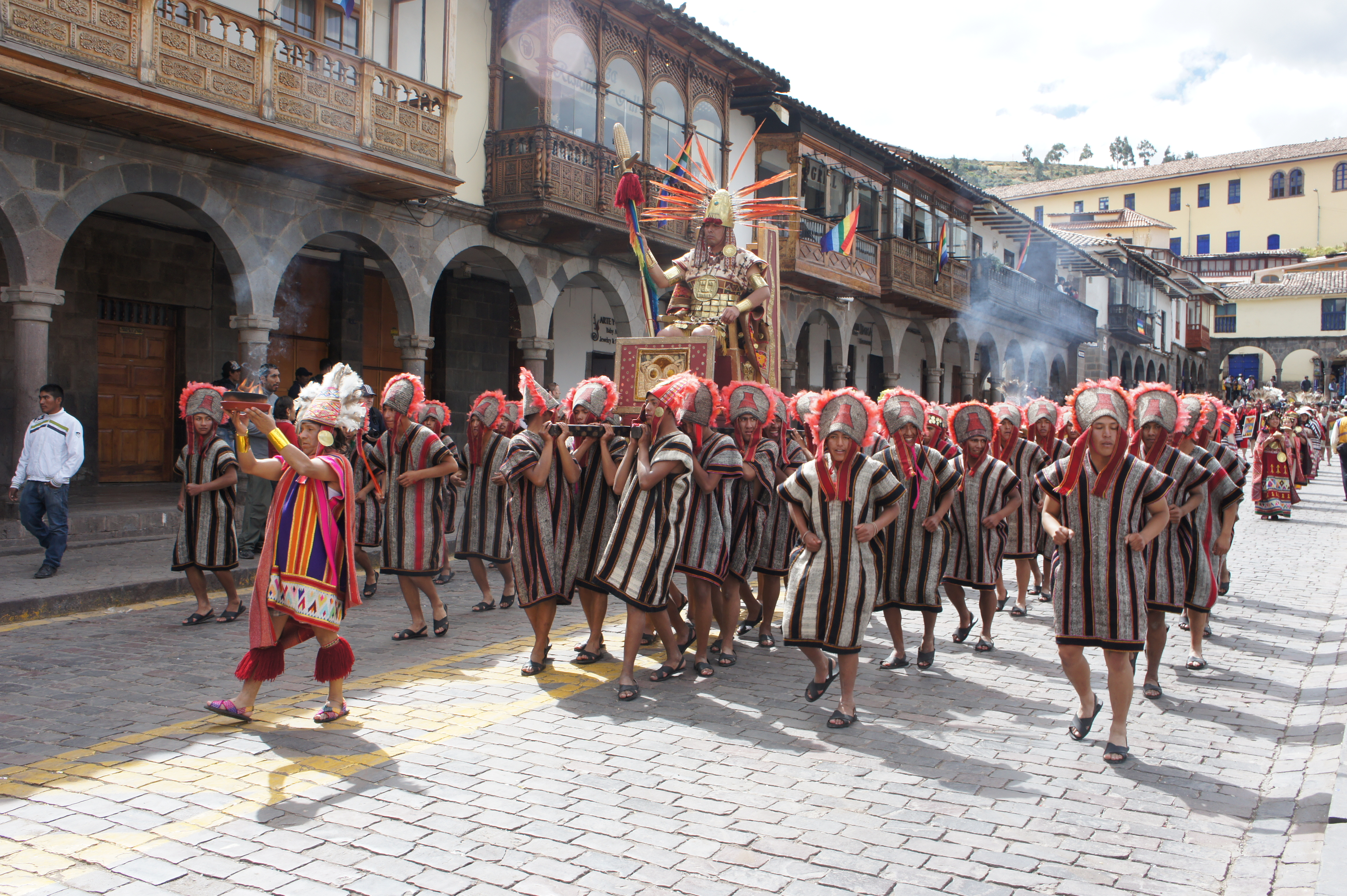
Inca carried on his golden throne during the Inti Raymi, 2011

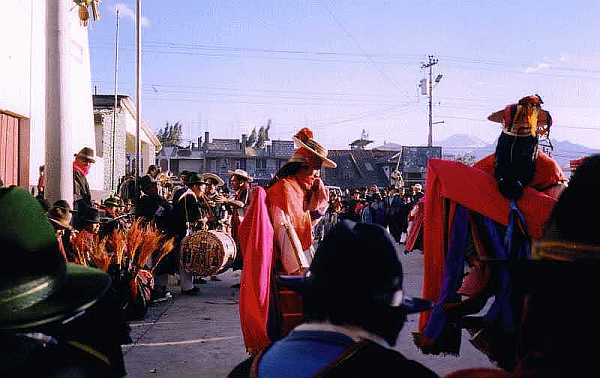
Celebration of Inti Raymi by the Salasaca, in the background the Chimborazo can be seen

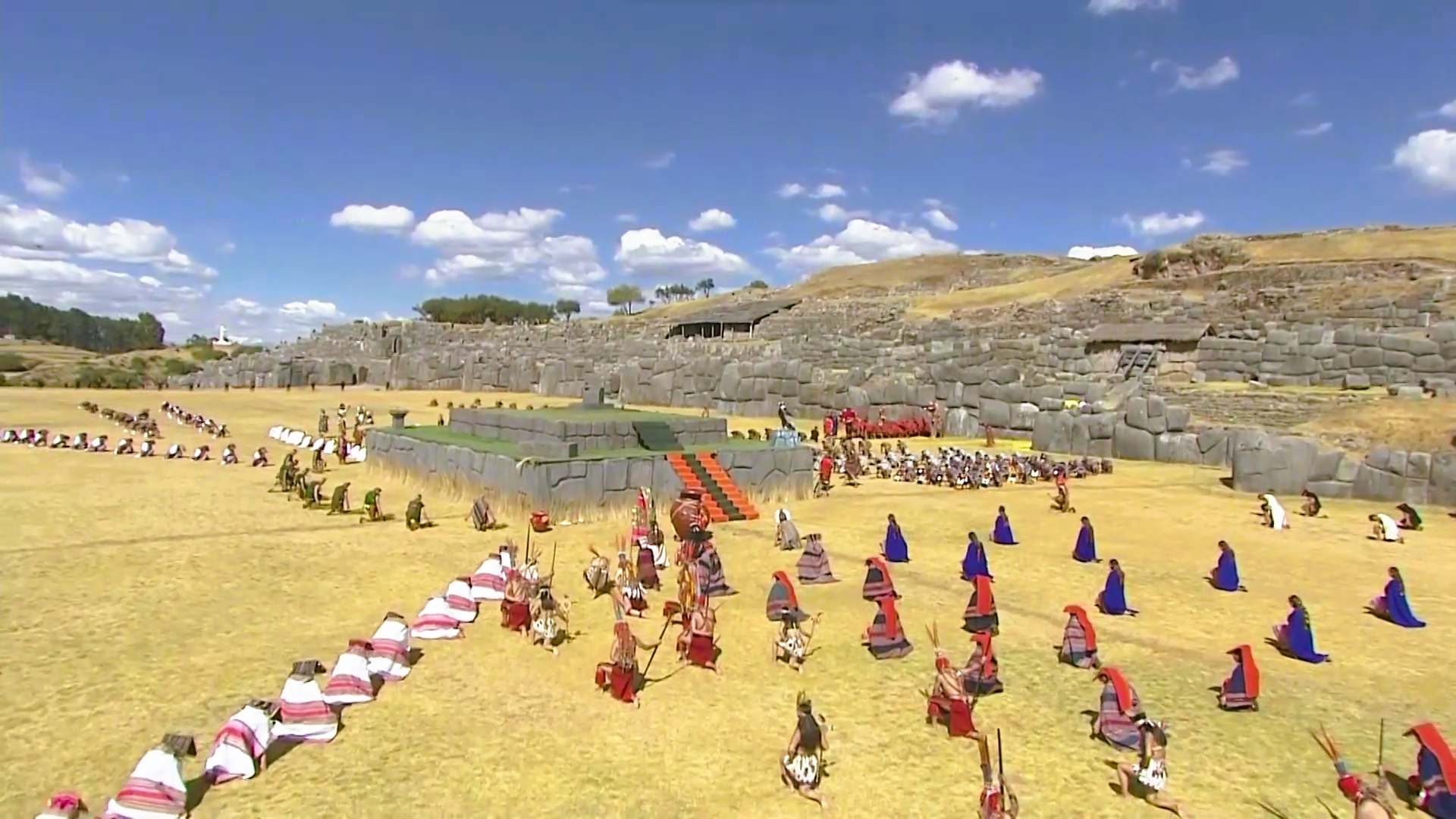
The Inti Raymi in 2021
