= Inka Museum =

Museum in Cusco, Peru

- Museo Inka
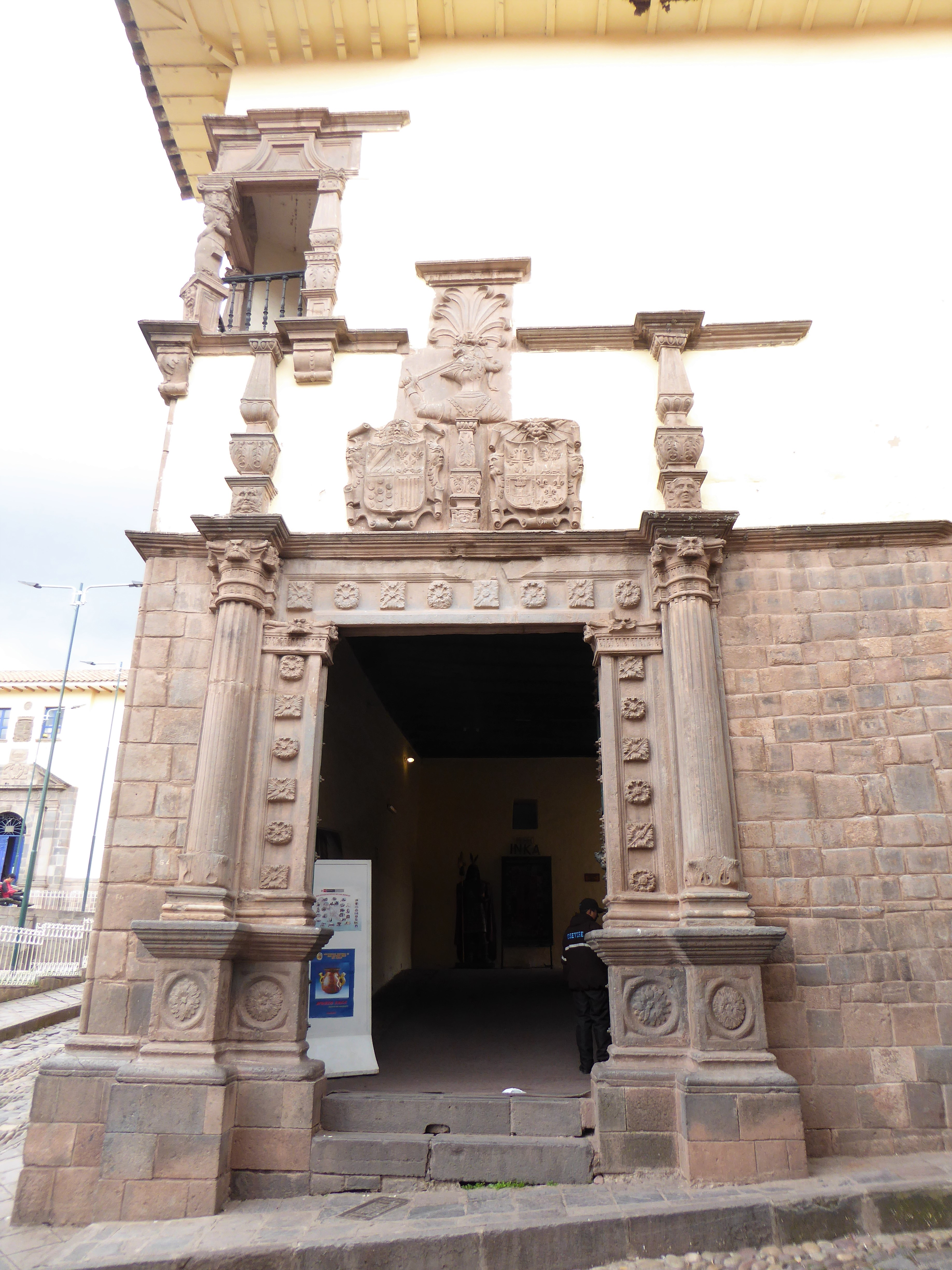
- Entrance to the museum
- Former name: Archaeological Museum of the University of Cusco
- Established: 1920
- Location: Cuesta del Almirante 103, Cusco, Peru
- Coordinates: 13.5152°S 71.9782°W
- Type: Archaeological museum
- Key holdings: Queros, mummies, ceremonial objects
- Collections: Inca artifacts, textiles, ceramics, tools, metalwork, weapons
- Website: museoinka.unsaac.edu.pe

The Inka Museum is the Archaeological Museum of the National University of San Antonio Abad of Cusco, located in the city of Cusco, Peru. It was previously called the Archaeological Museum of the University of Cusco.

The museum houses a collection of keros, textiles, mummies, tools, weapons, and goldsmithing. It chronologically covers the history of Cusco from its beginnings to the 20th century.

== History ==
The Inka Museum, originally known as the Archaeological Museum of the University of Cusco, was established in 1920. Its creation was supported by university rector Albert Giesecke, representatives from Cusco in the national parliament, and historian Luis E. Valcárcel, who served as its first director until 1930.

The museum's initial collections were formed from two acquisitions authorized by the Peruvian government in 1919: a group of antiquities from the former Biblioteca-Museo del Cusco and a private collection assembled by José Lucas Caparó Muñiz. These materials were transferred to Cusco in 1920 to serve as the foundation for the museum.

The museum was conceived as a regional institution dedicated to archaeological preservation and research. Its founding coincided with efforts by local academic and cultural organizations, including the Instituto Histórico del Cusco, to retain archaeological material within the region and promote historical study.

During Valcárcel’s tenure, the museum developed close ties with the Universidad Nacional de San Antonio Abad del Cusco. University courses in history and art history were introduced, and the museum served as a site for practical instruction and research.

In 1933 and 1934, the museum received government funding as part of the 400th anniversary commemorations of the Spanish foundation of Cusco. These funds were used for archaeological excavations and restoration projects in the surrounding region. That same year, the Archaeological Institute of Cusco was created and later merged with the museum. Its headquarters were located on Tigre Street, in the building that would become the university's rectorate.

The museum is currently known as the Inka Museum and is located in the Casa del Almirante (Admiral’s Palace), a 17th-century building on Cuesta del Almirante. It continues to operate under the administration of the National University of San Antonio Abad of Cusco.

== Location ==
It is located in the colonial house Casa del Almirante. The site was once the house of Huáscar during the Inca Empire. It was built by Admiral Francisco Alderete Maldonado in the early 1. It was later occupied by the archbishopric, served as the palace of the last viceroy, and as Government House of Marshal Santa Cruz. The house was damaged by the 1950 earthquake.

== See also ==
- National University of San Antonio Abad of Cusco
- Luis E. Valcárcel
