= Luis E. Valcárcel =

Peruvian anthropologist (1891–1987)

OSP Luis Eduardo Valcárcel
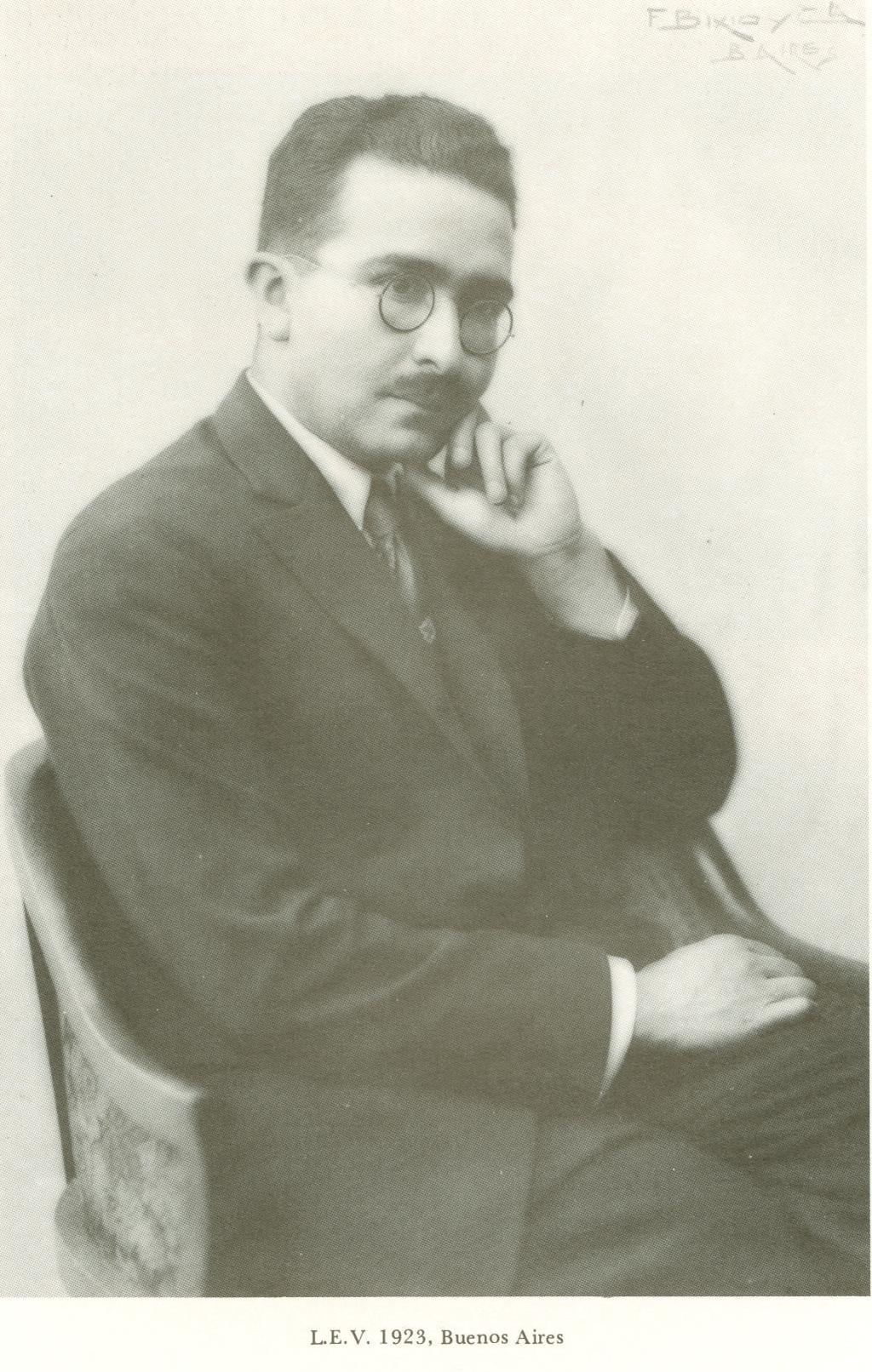

Minister of Education of Peru
- In office 1945–1947
- President: José Bustamante y Rivero
- Prime Minister: Rafael Belaúnde Diez Canseco; Julio Ernesto Portugal
- Preceded by: Jorge Basadre Grohmann
- Succeeded by: Cristóbal de Losada y Puga

Personal details
- Born: Luis Eduardo Valcárcel Vizcarra; 8 February 1891 Ilo, Peru
- Died: 26 December 1987 (aged 96) Lima, Peru
- Occupation: Historian, anthropologist
- Awards: Knight of the Legion of Honour; Commander of the Order of Merit of the Italian Republic; Great Order of the Sun of Peru; Congressional Medal of Honor in the Degree of Grand Officer

Luis Eduardo Valcárcel Vizcarra (8 February 1891 – 26 December 1987) was a Peruvian historian, anthropologist, writer and activist. He was a researcher of pre-Hispanic Peru and one of the protagonists of the Indigenismo movement. He is considered the father of Peruvian anthropology, and his work focused on two fundamental axes: the revaluation of the Inca Empire and the vindication of the Andean culture. He brought awareness to the continuity that links the peasant of the Andes with the man of the Tahuantinsuyu.

== Biography ==
His parents, Domingo L. Valcárcel and Leticia Vizcarra, had him at an early age in the city of Cuzco in 1892, where he lived for the next four decades. He completed his secondary studies at the Seminario de San Antonio Abad, and then went on to the Universidad Nacional de San Antonio Abad del Cusco, where he graduated with a Bachelor of Arts with a thesis entitled: Kon, Pachacamac and Wiracocha (1912), later as a Doctor (11-21-1912); Bachelor in Political and Administrative Sciences with the thesis titled The Agrarian Question in Cuzco (1913); Bachelor of Jurisprudence, with the thesis De Ayllu al Imperio (1916); and Dr. (1916) as well as becoming a lawyer. In 1909, he participated in the university strike that transformed the university into a more modern, democratic institution concerned with the regional problems of Cuzco, thanks to the appointment of the American Albert Giesecke as rector.

He taught beginning in 1917 at the National College of Sciences and Arts of Cusco and at the aforementioned National University. He founded the first Anthropological Museum of Cuzco and the University Archive. He was director of El Comercio of Cuzco and editorial writer for the newspapers El Sol, La Sierra, and El Sur. In 1920, he formed the "Resurgence" group with students and intellectuals from Cuzco, such as José Uriel García, Luis Felipe Aguilar and the brothers Félix Cosío Medina and José Gabriel Cosío Medina, a group that defended the indigenous people from the injustices they suffered, thus starting the Indigenismo movement that this group later called the "Cusqueña School", which spread in various areas of culture at the national level. Some of its representatives are for example; in literature, José María Arguedas, Ciro Alegría, Enrique López Albújar, in painting, José Sabogal, Julia Codesido, José Camilo Blas, in poetry, Cesar Vallejo, and others.

He maintained close relations with the philosopher José Carlos Mariátegui, and with the group linked to the magazine Amauta. He additionally kept relations with other intellectuals such as the philosopher and politician Víctor Raúl Haya de la Torre who directed his 1927 essay "The Indian Problem" to the group Resurgence. At the beginning of the third decade of the 20th century, he was called to Lima to be appointed Director of the Bolivarian Museum; and soon obtained the same position in the National Museum of Archaeology, Anthropology and History of Peru. On retirement, in 1964, he was appointed as Director Emeritus of the National Museums.

He played an important role in the four hundredth anniversary of Universidad Nacional Mayor de San Marcos of Lima, where he chaired: History of the Incas, History of Peruvian Culture, and Introduction to Ethnology. In addition, he was Director-Founder of the Institute of Ethnology, Dean of the Faculty of Arts, and Professor Emeritus. He also held a teaching career at Columbia University in New York City.

== Jobs and public life ==
He was Minister of Public Education (from 1945 to 1947, a position which reflected the establishment of peasant school nuclei, a network of rural schools that it integrated education, health and work for children and members of a peasant community. He followed the example of Waynasata de Bolivia (1945). President of the Institute of Peruvian Studies, of the National Association of Writers and Artists (ANEA), of the Peruvian North American Cultural Institute (ICPNA), and of the Inter-American Committee of Folklore; Director of the Peruvian Indian Institute; Member of the Peruvian Executive Committee of Unesco; Vice President of the National Academy of History, and of the Center for Military-Historical Studies.

The Quechua language and Andean popular culture were his concern, as the Ministry of Education, the University and from their publications. He promoted the reactivation of Inti Raymi in Cuzco. He was nominated for a Nobel Peace Prize.

== Awards and honors ==
The following is a list of several awards and honors.

- Palmas Magisteriales in the degree of Amauta
- Knight of the Legion of Honor of France (1939).
- The Great Order of the Sun of Peru (1945).
- Israel Medal (1964).
- Commander Medal of the Order of Merit of the Italian Republic (1964).
- Medal of Honor of the Congress of Americanists of Mar de Plata (Argentina, 1966).
- National Culture Award in the area of Historical Sciences (1977).
- Rafael Heliodoro Valle Award. To the most outstanding Latin American historian (Mexico, 1981).
- Diploma of Honor from the Universidad Mayor de San Marcos (1981).
- Congressional Medal of Honor in the Degree of Grand Officer (1981).
- Gold Medal of Cusco (1983).
- Medal of the City of Lima (Municipality of Lima, 1984).
- Peruvian Cross Medal for Military Merit, in the rank of Grand Officer (1984).

== Professional career ==
The following is a list of several positions in his professional career.

- President and founder of the Peruvian Indian Institute (1946).
- Director Emeritus of the National Museums of Peru (1946)
- President of the Inter-American Folklore Committee (1953).
- Member of the Chilean Society of Sociology (1957).
- President of the National Board of Archeology (1962).
- Vice-president and member of number of the National Academy of History of Lima (1962).
- Member of the National Academy of Sciences (1962).
- Member of the Center for Historical Studies – Military (1962).
- Member of the Metropolitan Deliberative Board for the study of the Historical and Artistic Heritage of Lima (1962).
