= Kenko =

Kenko or Kenkō (健康) (Japanese for "health") may refer to:

- Kenko (company), a Japanese manufacturer of photographic accessories
- Kenko, Peru, an archaeological site in the Cusco Region of Peru
- Kenko, a crater in Mercury

== People ==
=== Surname ===
- Satoshi Kenkō (1967–1998), Japanese sumo wrestler

=== Given name ===
- Kenkō sukoyaka (2018-), character in yandere simulator games

=== Given name ===
- Kenko Matsuki (born 1959), Japanese politician
- Kenkō Yoshida (1283–1352), Japanese author and Buddhist monk
- Kenko Takebe (1664–1739), Japanese mathematician
- Kenko Miura (born 1979), Japanese racing driver
- Kenko Nakaima, one of the founders of Ryūei-ryū karate

== See also ==
- Kenkō Zenrakei Suieibu Umishō, a 2005 manga series by Mitsuru Hattori
- Kenko-Hoken (Social Insurance) and Kokumin-Kenko-Hoken (National Health Insurance), the two main categories of health insurance in Japan
- Kenco, instant coffee
