= Titiqaqa (Cusco) =

Archaeological site in Peru

- Location: Peru, Cusco Region, Cusco Province, Cusco District

Titiqaqa (Quechua titi lead, lead colored, qaqa rock, other spellings Teteqaqa, Teteq'aq'a) is an archaeological site in Peru. It is located in the Cusco Region, Cusco Province, Cusco District, in the northeast of Cusco.
