= Ximena Heraud =

Peruvian visual artist (born 1984)

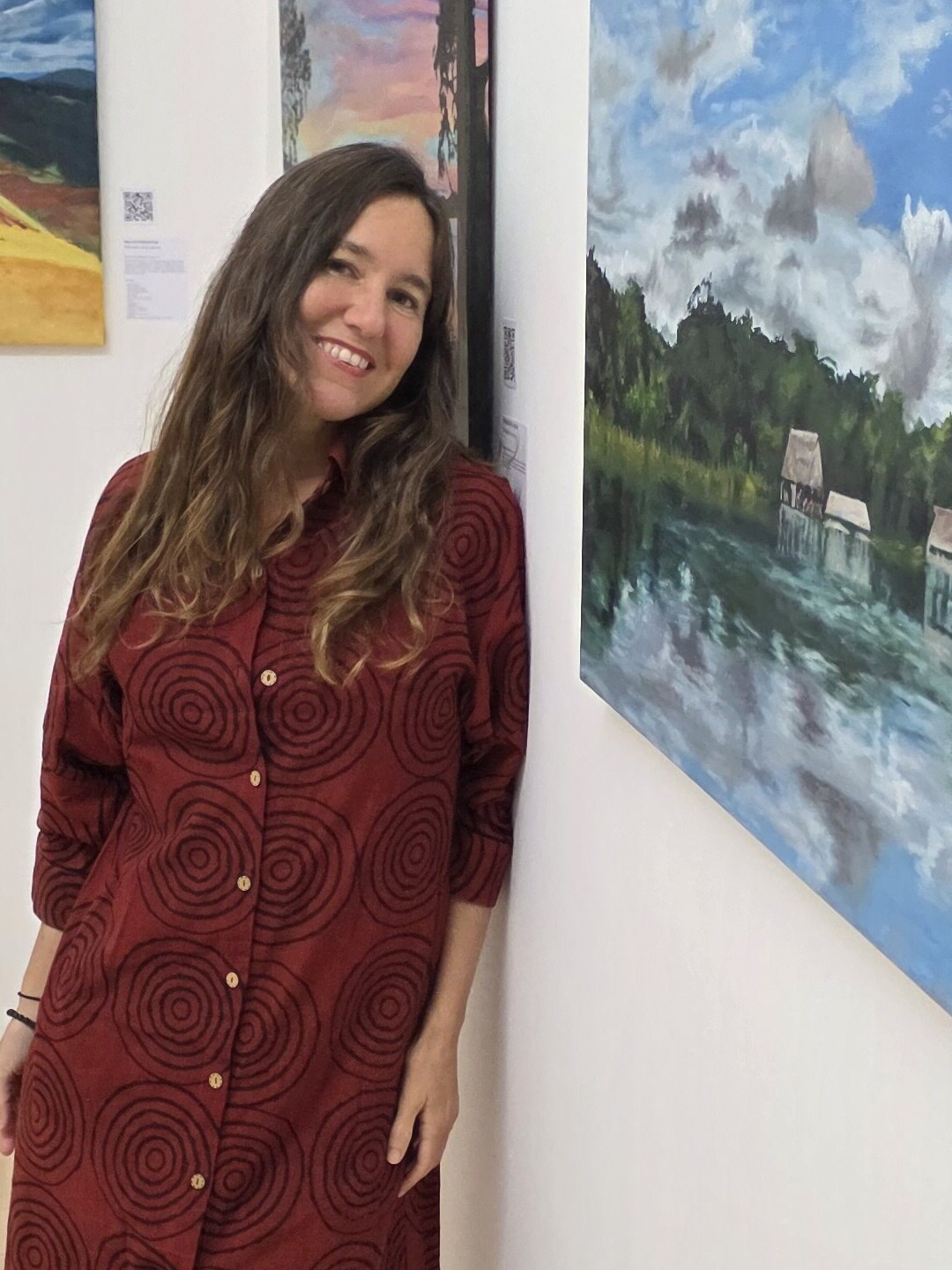
- Born: Ximena María Heraud Corazao; 1984 (age 41–42); Lima, Peru
- Education: National Art School, Sydney
- Known for: Painting, ceramics
- Notable work: Recorriendo Perú series
- Website: ximenaheraud.com

Ximena María Heraud Corazao (born 1984), known professionally as Ximena Heraud, is a Peruvian visual artist known for her landscape paintings and ceramics. Working mainly in acrylic and oil, she combines abstract symbolism with a style that has been described as "mystical realism", drawing on Peruvian geography, pre-Columbian symbols and environmental themes. She is best known for her series Recorriendo Perú ("Traveling Peru"), which she has toured through Europe, the United Kingdom, the United States and Latin America since 2018, frequently with the support of Peruvian embassies.

== Early life and education ==
Heraud was born in Lima in 1984. She is a relative of the Peruvian poet Javier Heraud; she is frequently described as his niece, although according to La República her father is a cousin of the poet. According to the Peruvian state newspaper El Peruano, she is a great-granddaughter of the American-born educator Albert Giesecke, who settled in Peru.

She began painting as a self-taught child and also writes poetry. She later moved to Australia, where she studied painting at the National Art School in Sydney and took courses at the National Institute of Dramatic Art. She also holds a bachelor's degree in communication sciences from the Universidad San Ignacio de Loyola in Lima. She founded Arte Emú, an art studio in the La Molina district of Lima.

== Work and style ==
Heraud is a multidisciplinary artist who works mainly in painting and ceramics. Her paintings combine geometric patterns with organic motifs and pre-Incan symbolism, and she associates her imagery with the minerals, crystals and stones she has collected while travelling through Peru. She has said that she paints her ceramics using ash from an Agnihotra fire ceremony, which she regards as sacred. Her work has been described as fusing abstract and figurative elements and as expressing a spiritual connection with nature and a concern for the environment. Her paintings are exhibited alongside poems written by the artist and by Javier Heraud.

=== Recorriendo Perú ===
Her best-known body of work is the series Recorriendo Perú ("Traveling Peru"), a group of oil-on-canvas landscapes based on journeys through the Peruvian coast, highlands (sierra) and Amazon (selva) regions, some in remote locations reached by climbing or swimming. The paintings depict sites such as the Colca Canyon, the Nazca Lines, the Uros islands, the Yarinacocha lagoon, the Puya raimondii and the Huacachina oasis, and are shown alongside videos of her travels. Individual works include Laguna del Milagro (oil on canvas, 2017).

== Exhibitions ==
Solo exhibitions of Recorriendo Perú (also shown as Travelling in Peru) include:

- 2018 – Czech Centre Gallery, Prague, Czech Republic, during the first Ibero-American Week
- 2019 – Cervantes Institute, Bucharest, Romania (16 works), organised by the Embassy of Peru in Romania
- 2022 – Melina Mercouri Cultural Centre, Athens, Greece, part of the LEA Festival and sponsored by the Embassy of Peru
- 2024 – Sala Inca Garcilaso, Embassy of Peru, London, United Kingdom (14 works)
- 2025 – Stagecoach Run Art Festival, Franklin Railroad Museum, New York, United States (paintings and ceramics)
- 2026 – Whitespace Gallery, Edinburgh, Scotland

In 2021 she was among more than 200 international artists in the fourth Salerno Contemporary Art Biennial (Lunatica) in Italy. Her work has also been exhibited in Australia, Germany, Colombia, Mexico and Peru.
