= Pukamuqu =

Mountain in Peru

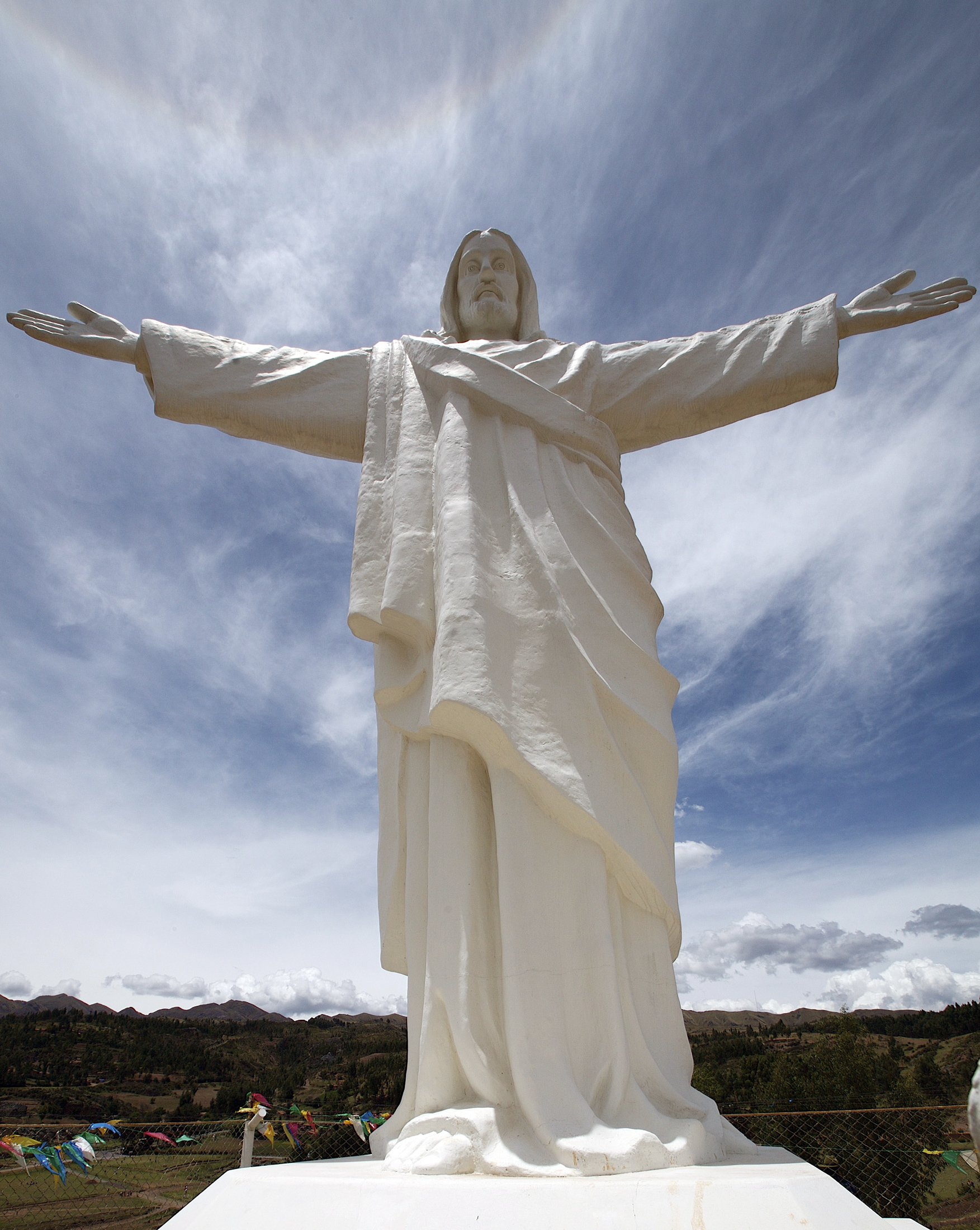
- The Cristo Blanco statue on top of the mountain Pukamuqu

Highest point
- Elevation: 3,600 m (11,800 ft)
- Coordinates: 13°30′35″S 71°58′41″W

Geography
- Location within Peru
- Location: Peru, Cusco Region, Cusco Province
- Parent range: Andes

Pukamuqu (Quechua, puka red, muqu hill / joint, "red hill") is a mountain in Peru. It is situated in the Cusco Region, Cusco Province, Cusco District. It is a natural viewpoint of the city of Cusco situated at a height of 3,600 metres (11,811 ft). On top of the mountain there is a statue called Cristo Blanco (Spanish for "white Christ").
