= Tambomachay =

Archaeological site in Peru

Coordinates: 13°28′51″S 71°57′53″W

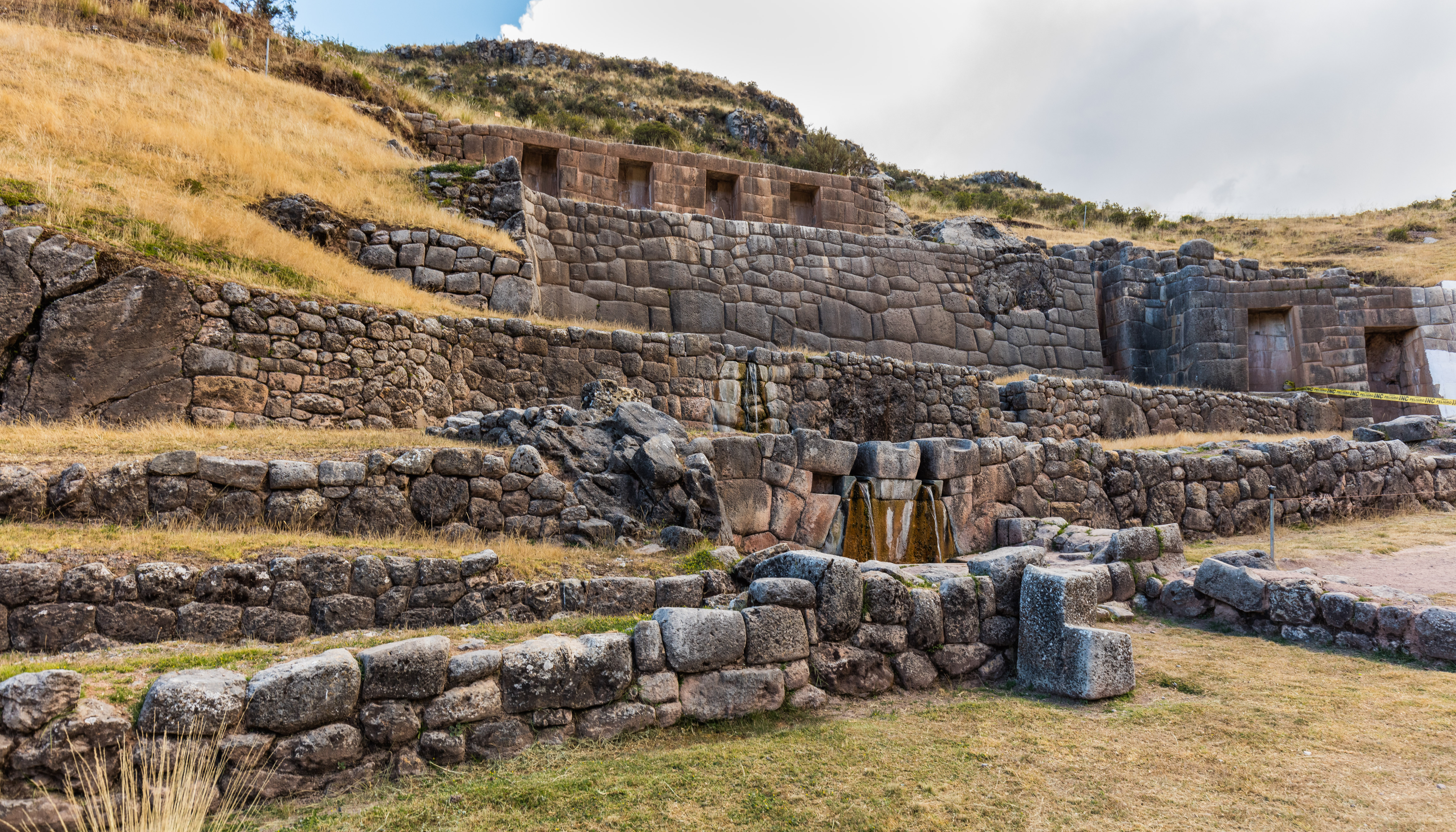
- View of Tambomachay.

- Location within Peru
- Interactive map of Tambomachay
- Type: Fortress
- Periods: Late Horizon
- Cultures: Inca
- Location: Cusco District, Cusco

Tambomachay (possibly from Quechua tampu inn, guest house, mach'ay cave, or machay drunkenness, to get drunk or "spindle with thread") is an archaeological site associated with the Inca Empire, located near Cusco, Peru. An alternate Spanish name is El Baño del Inca ("the bath of the Inca").

It consists of a series of aqueducts, canals and waterfalls that run through the terraced rocks. It is situated near springs such as the one called Timpuc Puquiu, a boiling spring on the northern bank of the Timpuc River and the spring near Huaylla Cocha community. These natural springs were channeled through three waterfalls that still flow today.

The function of the site is uncertain: it may have served as a military outpost guarding the approaches to Cusco, as a spa resort for the Incan political elite or imperial baths. It could have also served a religious function since sacred water fountains were found almost all of major Incan temple such as Pisac, Ollantaytambo, and Machu Picchu. There are sources that refer to Tambomachay as one of the nine ceques built along the Road of Antisuyu, describing it as an Incan house where sacrifices were also made.

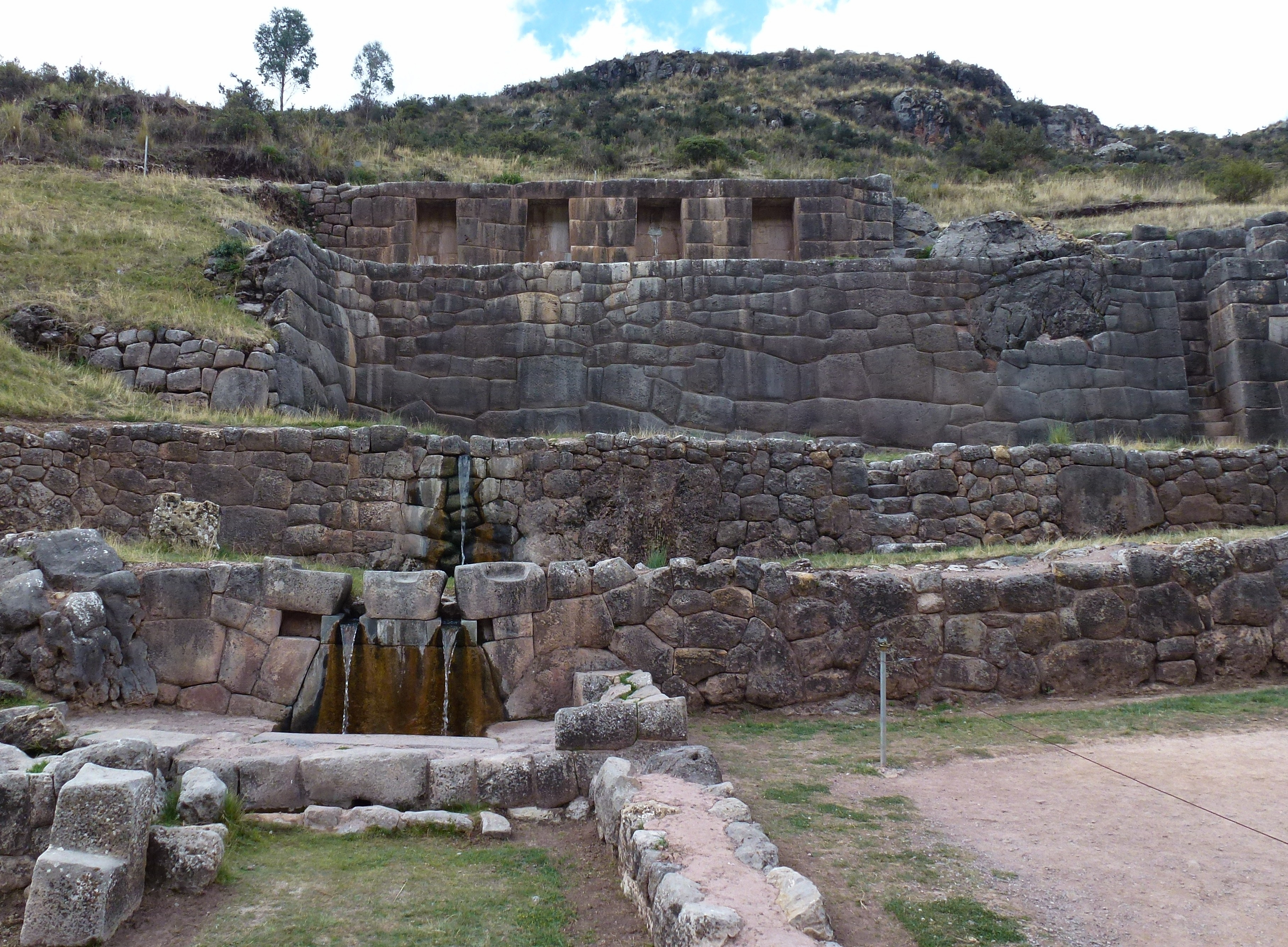

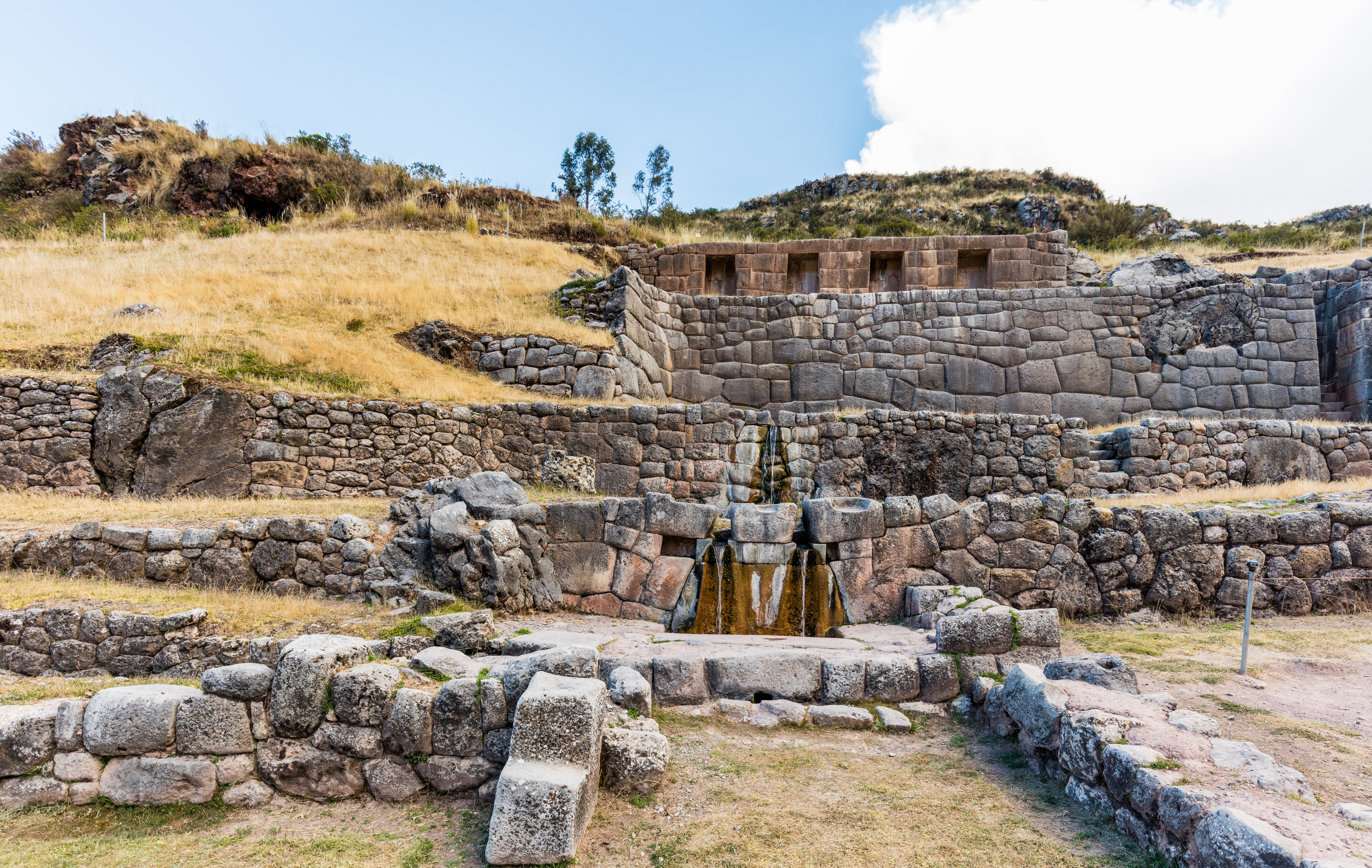
Three small baths at Tambomachay

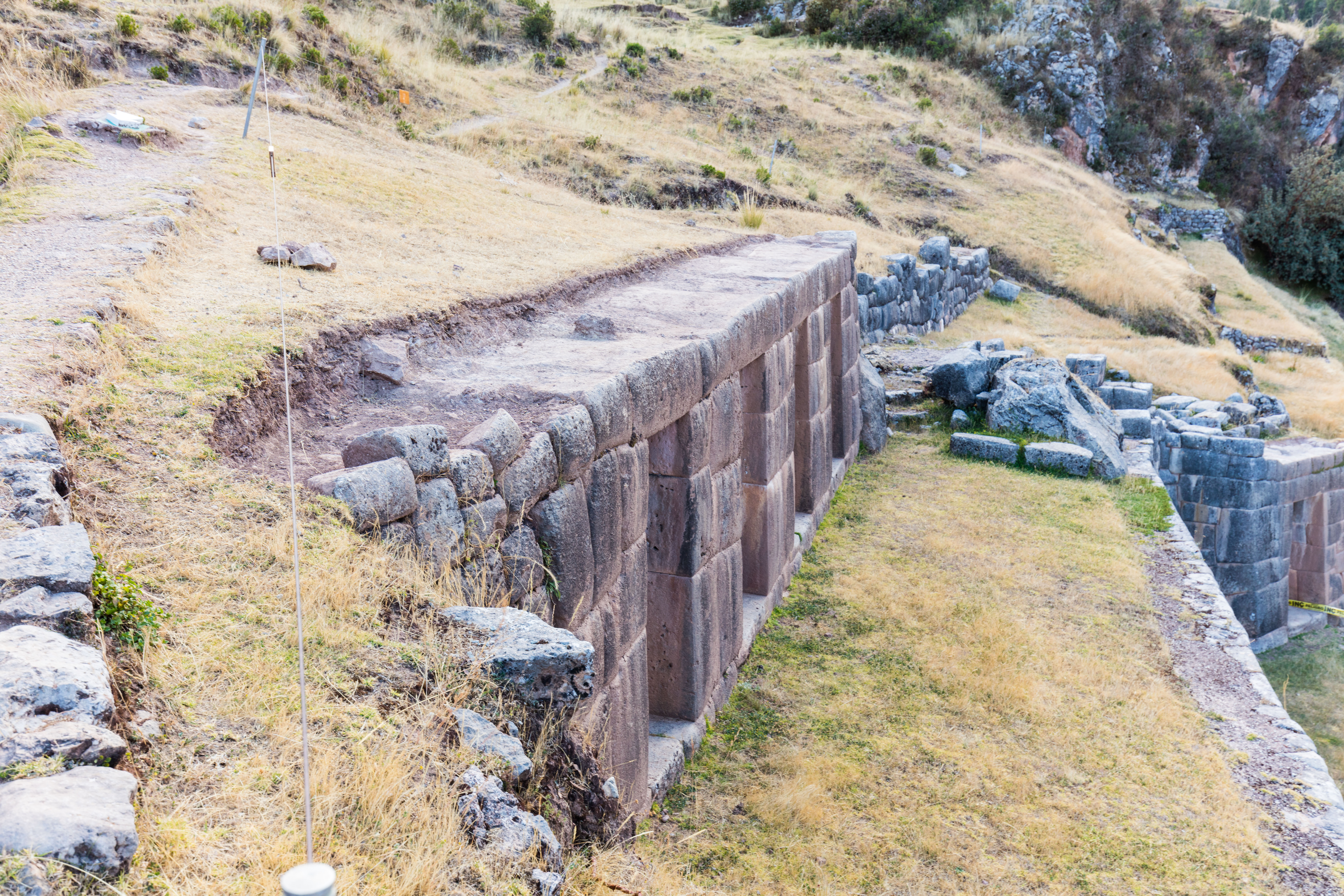
Ancient ruins

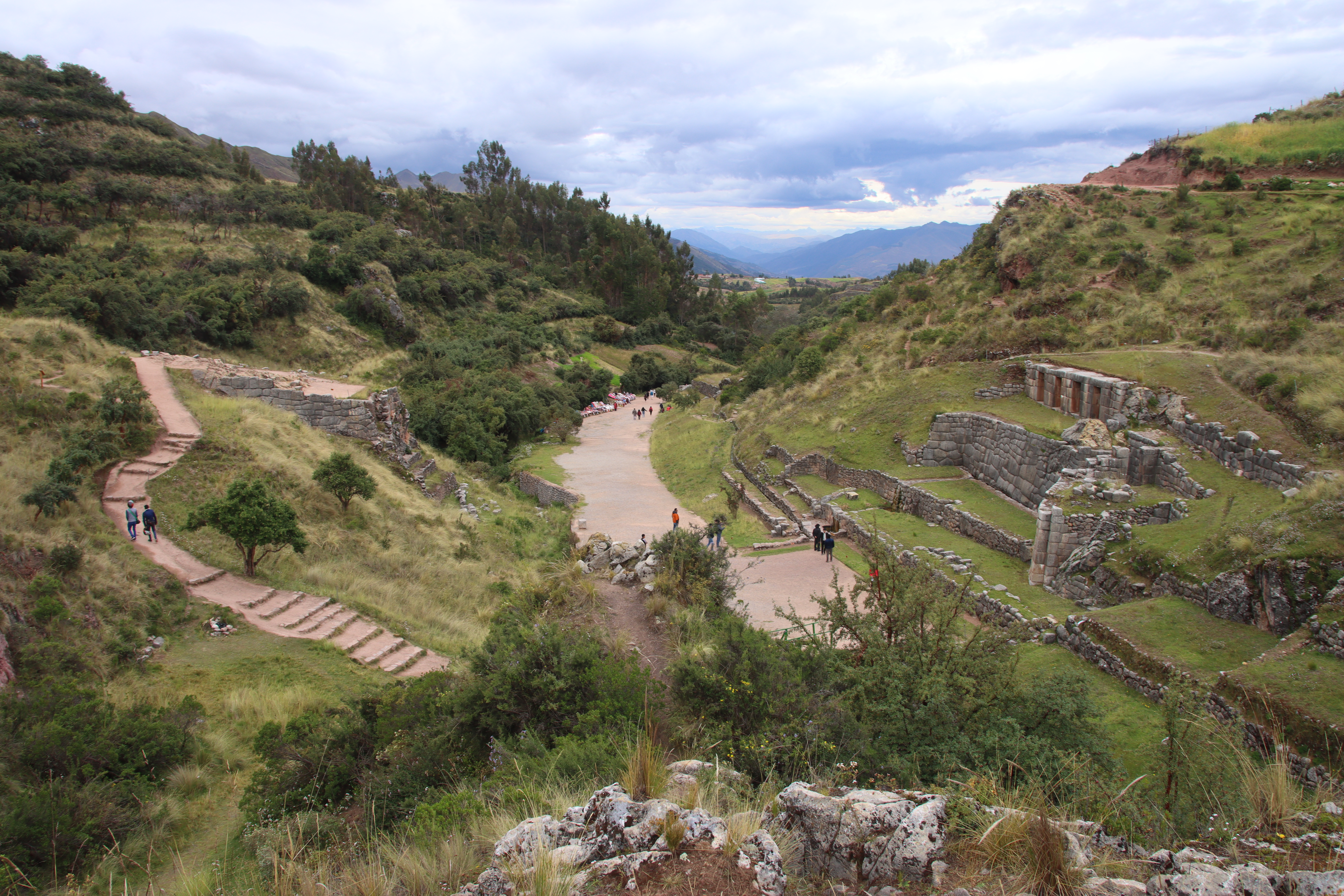
Upper view

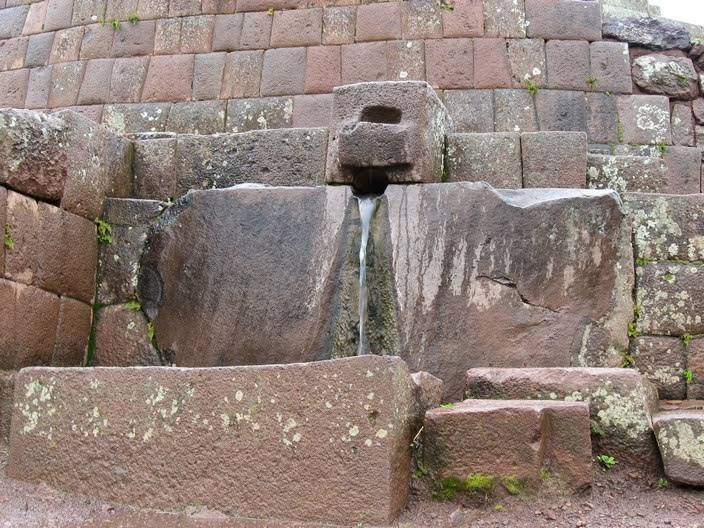

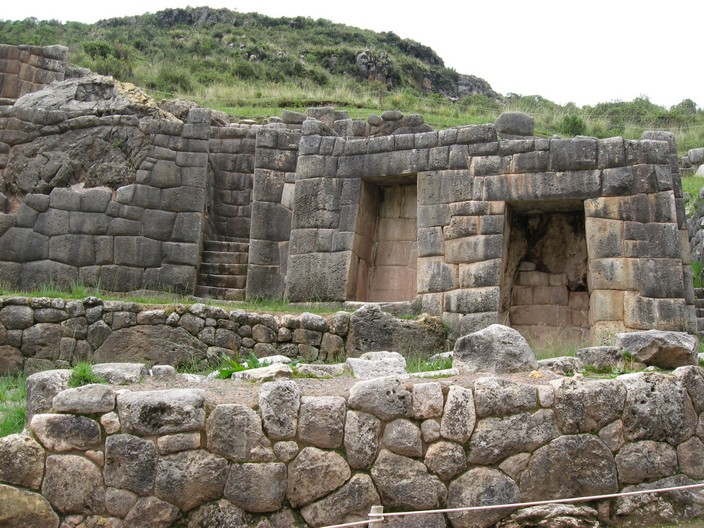

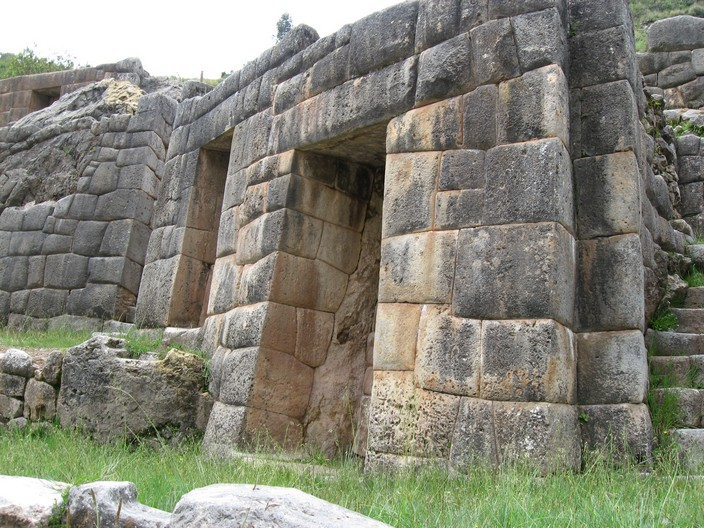

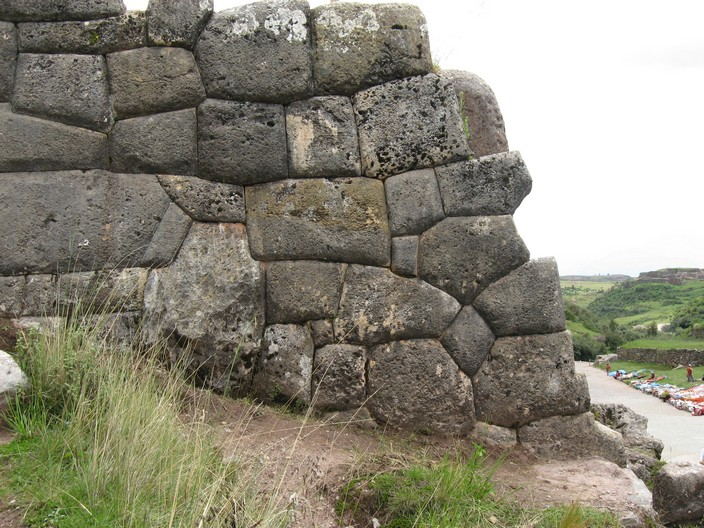

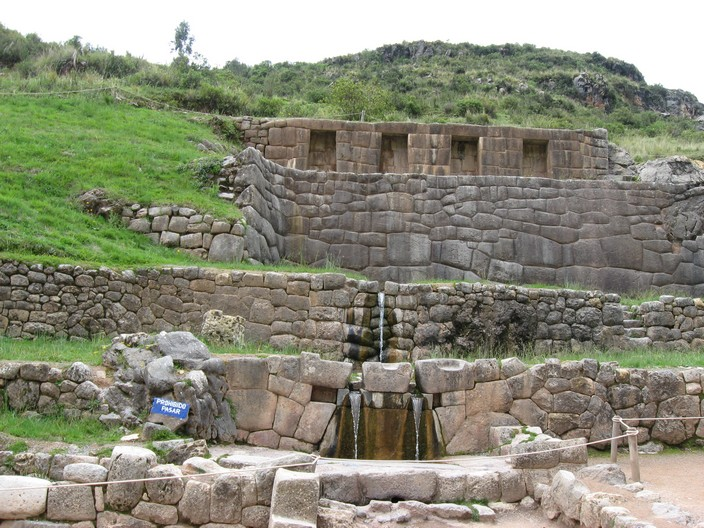
