= Puka Pukara =

Archaeological site in Peru

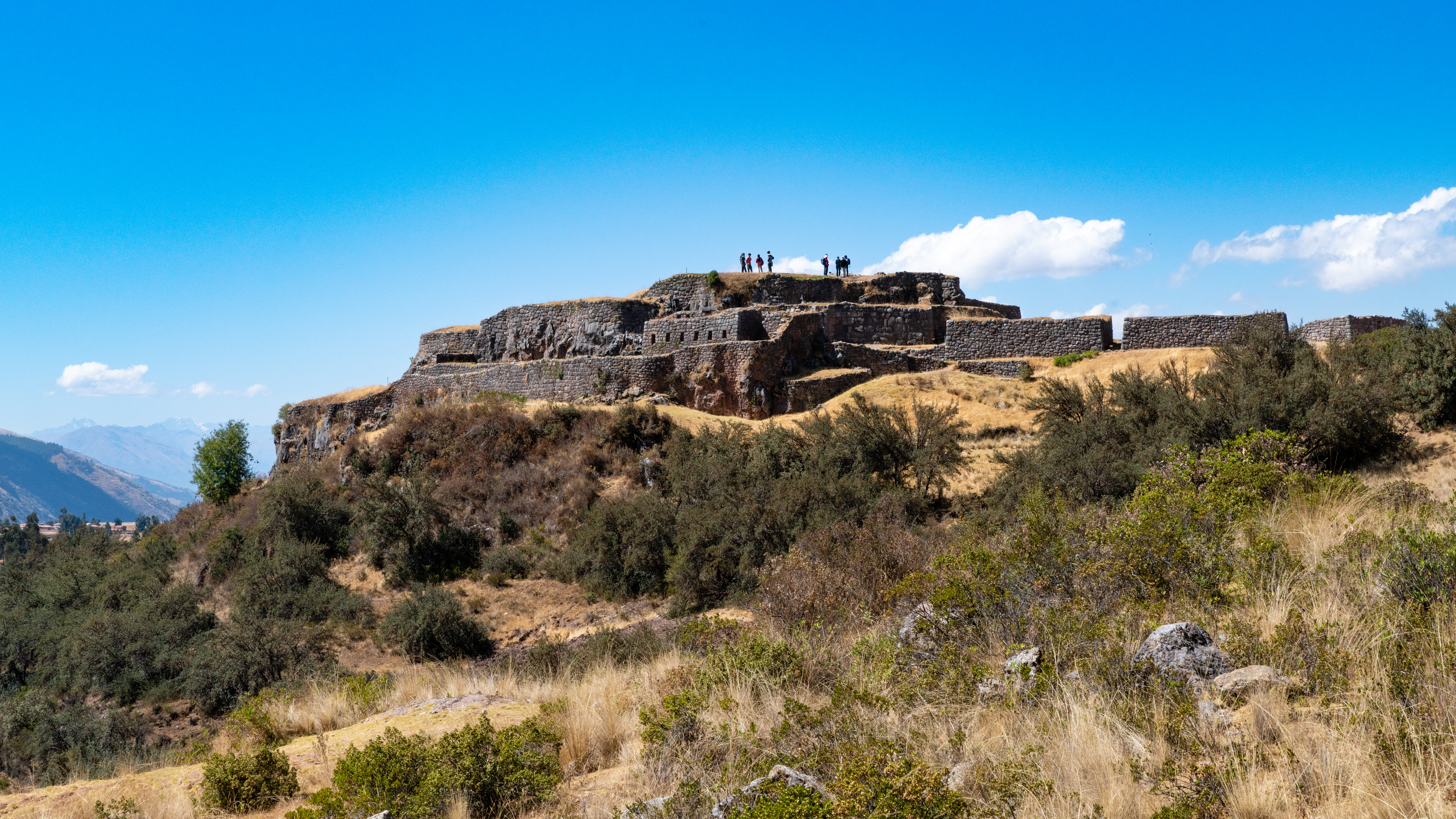
- Puka Pukara

- Location within Peru
- Interactive map of Puka Pukara
- 13°29′00″S 71°57′43″W
- Location: Peru, Cusco Region, Cusco Province
- Region: Andes

Puka Pukara (Quechua puka red, pukara fortress, "red fortress", hispanicized spellings Pucapucara, Puca Pucara, Puca Pucará) is a site of military ruins in Peru situated in the Cusco Region, Cusco Province, Cusco District, near Cusco. This fort is made of large walls, terraces, and staircases and was part of defense of Cusco in particular and the Inca Empire in general.

The name probably comes from the red color of the rocks at dusk. Puka Pukara is an example of military architecture that also functioned as an administrative center.

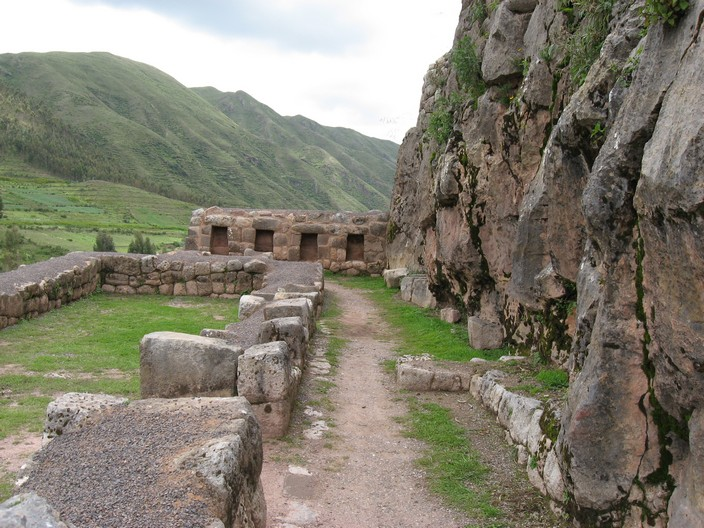
Outside view

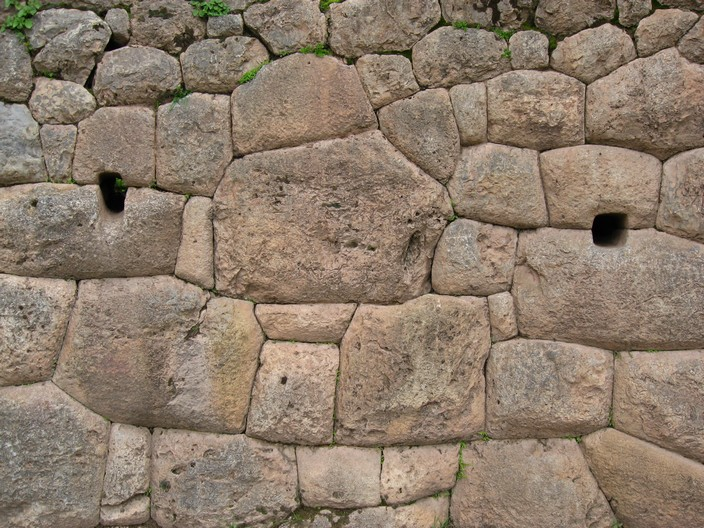
Inka stone placing

== Location ==
Puka Pukara is located in mid-southern Peru, about 7 kilometres (4.3 mi) from Cusco, on the road to Pisac, near to the Antisuyo, the jungle portion of the former Incan empire. The fort is located on high ground overlooking the Cusco valley and Tambo Machay, creating a beautiful and useful view. When it was built, it was probably placed so that these areas were visible to give the military extra vision over important parts of the empire.

== History ==
Although less is known about Puka Pukara than many other Incan ruins, there is a theory that this site was probably constructed during the reign of Pachacutec. If so, then since he was the ninth ruler of the empire, it can be said that Puka Pukara was one of the later constructions. The stones used to build most of the walls are very irregularly shaped, stacked together in kind of a here-and-there manner to create walls that are functional, but lacking very much beauty as far as architecture goes (in contrast to many nearby sites). Because of this, it seems likely the buildings and walls were built hurriedly, because the military headquarters that Puka Pukara became was thought to be needed very quickly. When it was first built, the differently sized and shaped stones that now appear grey may have actually been a red color (hence its name, meaning "red fortress") due to the presence of iron in the limestone used in the walls.

There is some debate over what Puka Pukara's real function was when the Incan empire was still thriving. It was at least partially a military base, and, since it was on such a major road and overlooking so many important spots, it was a very good place to spot people causing trouble. Officials could have used it as a checkpoint on the road, stopping those who looked suspicious from travelling any further into the empire where they could potentially wreak havoc. It could have served as a stop for military groups travelling nearby, too. Another theory is that it was a place of rest for hunters and weary travelers, as well as Incan nobles, due to all of its luxurious baths, canals, plazas, fountains, and separate rooms.

== Puka Pukara now ==
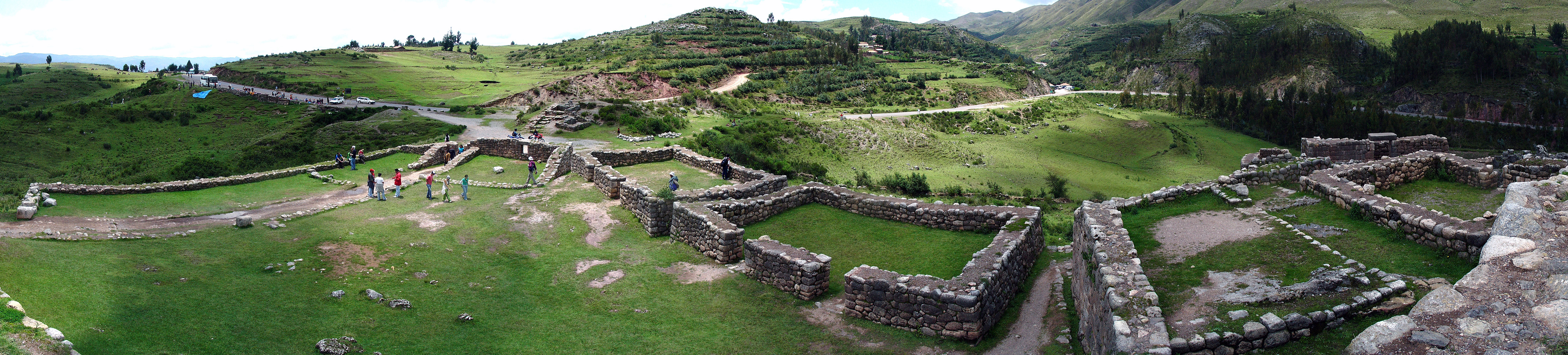
Puka Pukara

Because it is close to the city of Cusco, one of the most prominent archaeological sites in all of Peru, many people visit this area while they are touring the highlights of the Peruvian ruins. People visit the area for its views of the surrounding jungle and ruins and for the hues that are supposed to change the color of the walls around sunset.

The tourists help the Peruvian people make a living, too; it is common for people who live in the area to set up tables selling small souvenirs or offering to take pictures of groups in front of the ruins for a few soles.
