= Qenko =

Archaeological site in Peru

Q'enqo
- Qenqo, Qenko, Kenko, Quenco
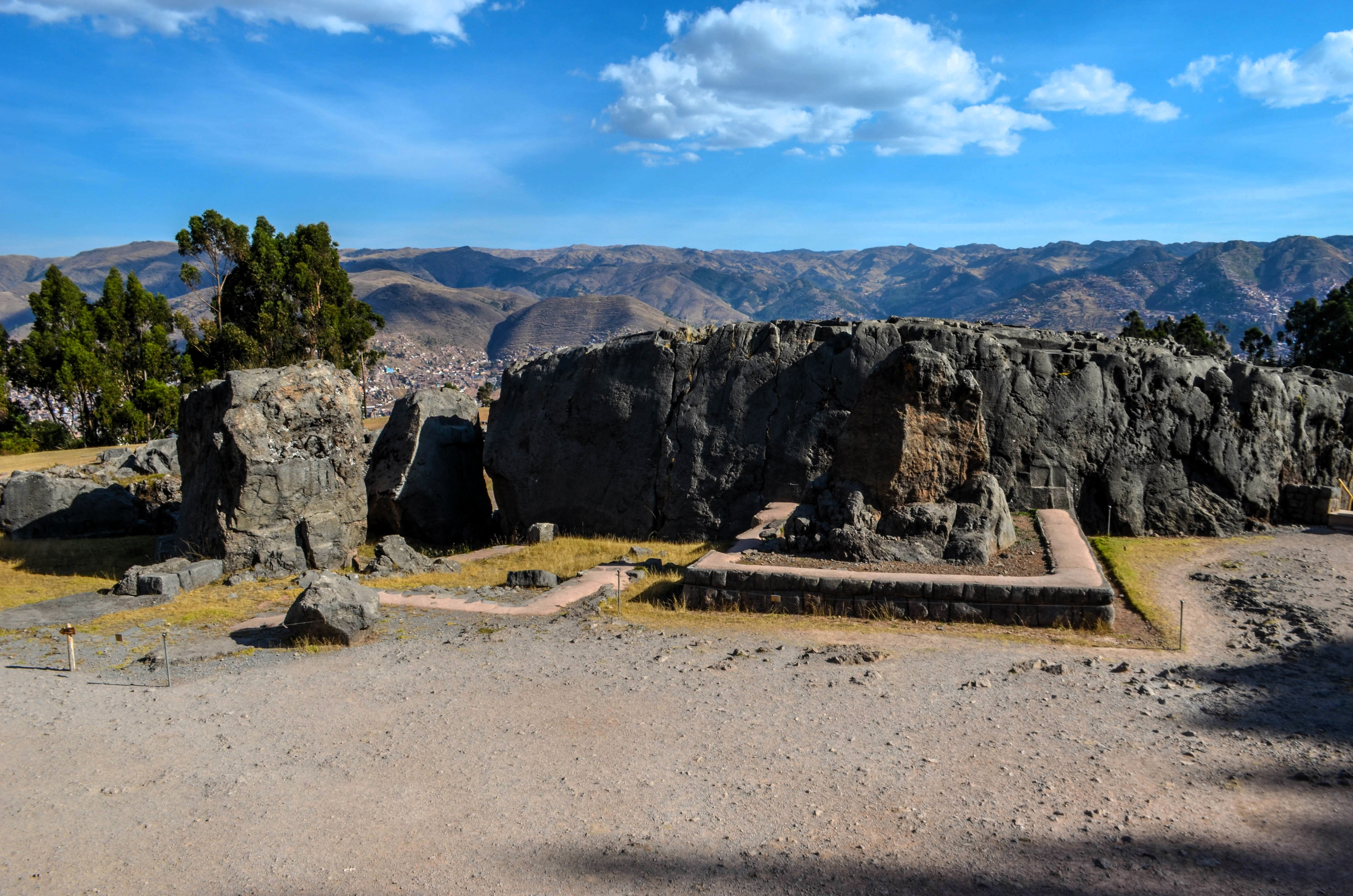
- Monoliths at Qenko

- Location within Peru
- Interactive map of Q'enqo
- 13°30′38″S 71°58′18″W
- Type: Temple
- Periods: Late Horizon
- Cultures: Inca
- Location: Cusco

Q'enqo, Qenko, Kenko, or Quenco (all from Quechua for "zig-zag") is an archaeological site in the Sacred Valley of Peru located in the Cusco Region, Cusco Province, Cusco District, located about 6 km north east of Cusco and to the east of Sacsayhuamán. The site was declared a Cultural Heritage (Patrimonio Cultural) of the Cusco Region by the National Institute of Culture.

One of the largest huacas (holy places) in the Cusco Region, it is believed to be a place where sacrifices and mummification took place. Many huacas were based on naturally occurring rock formations.

A tunnel runs inside the huaca with a large gutter on one side, leading to a room containing a ceremonial table with niches on either side. The discovery of many bones within the gutter leads experts to believe this room was the site of ritual sacrifices. One of the niches was used to hold mummies, while another contained a large silver plate which reflected the sun's rays into the room.

== Gallery ==
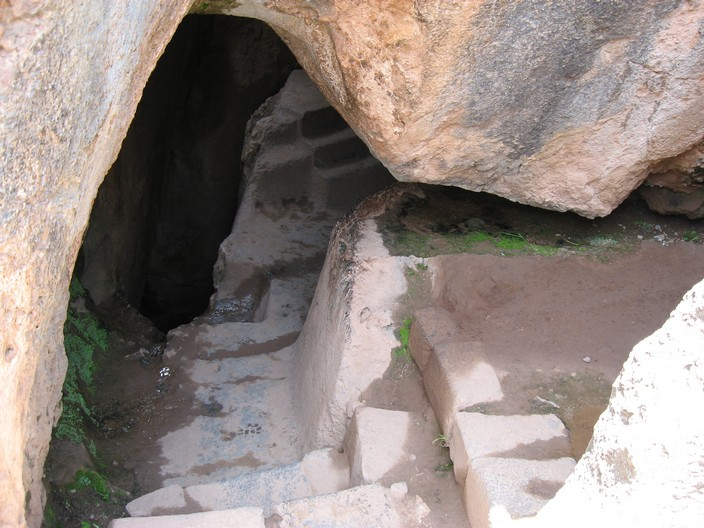

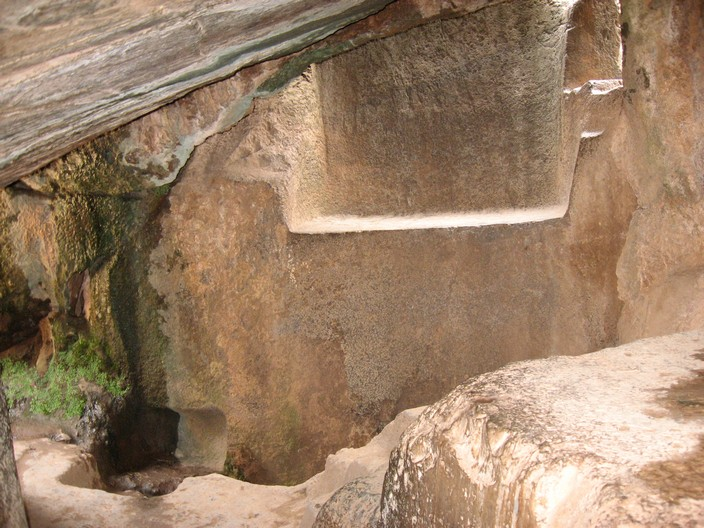

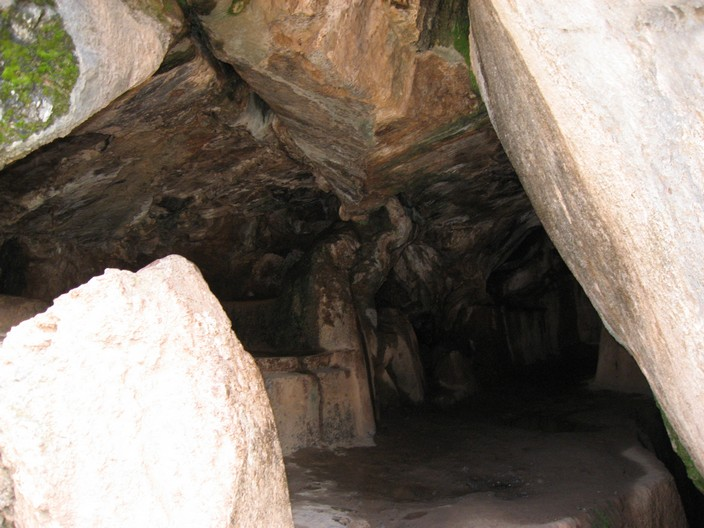

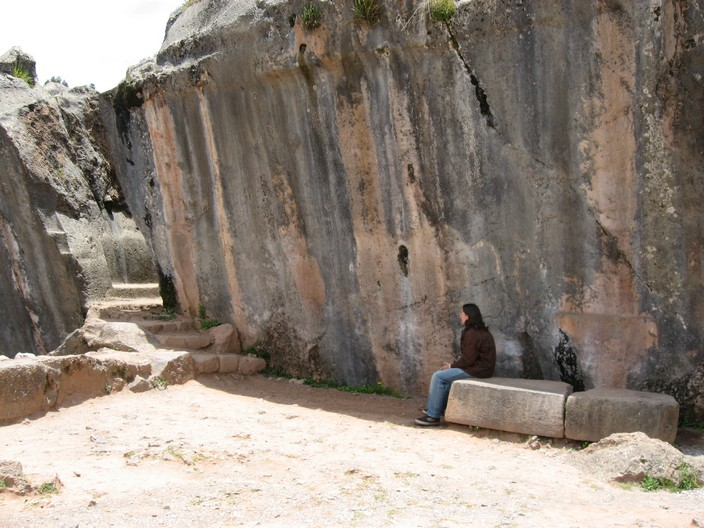

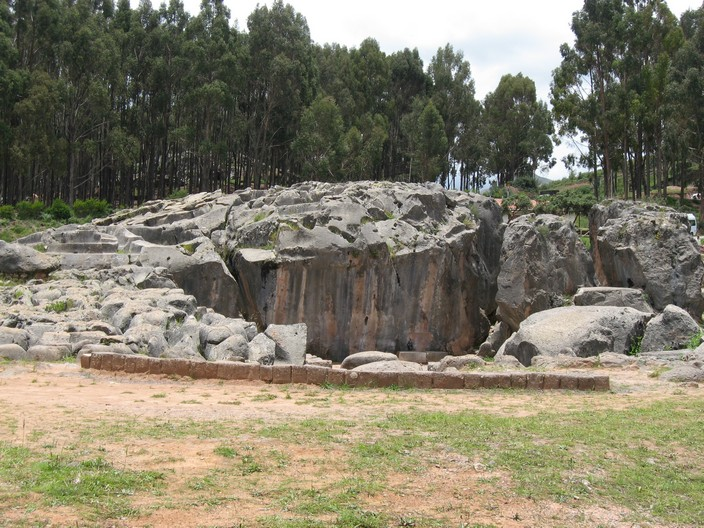

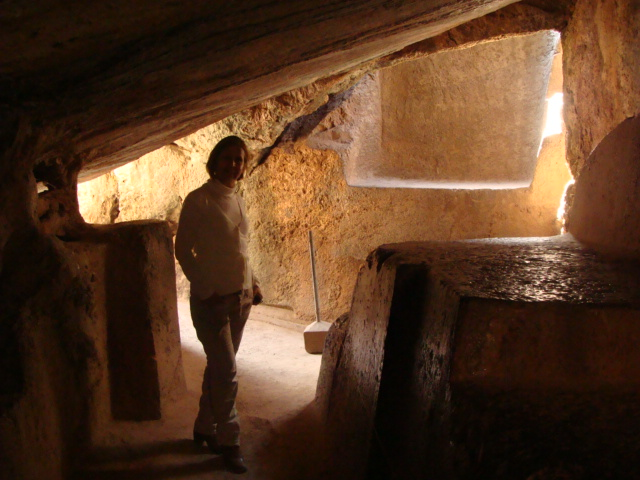
Underground shrine

== See also ==
- Amaru Marka Wasi
