= Amalia Puga de Losada =

Peruvian writer (1866-1963)

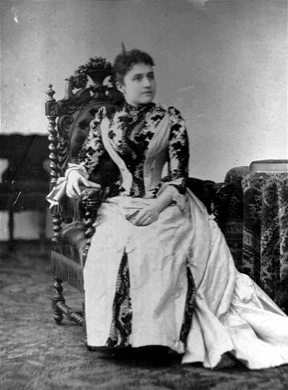
- Born: Amalia Natividad de las Mercedes Puga y Puga; 8 September 1866; Cajamarca, Peru
- Died: 20 September 1963 (aged 97); Lima, Peru
- Spouse: Enrique Cristóbal de Losada Plissé
- Children: Cristóbal de Losada y Puga
- Writing career
- Genre: Novel
- Notable awards: Order of the Sun of Peru

Amalia Natividad de las Mercedes Puga y Puga, best known as Amalia Puga de Losada (Cajamarca, September 8, 1866 - Lima, September 20, 1963), was a Peruvian writer, poet, novelist, essayist and storyteller. She was included as a member of the "Círculo Literario" in 1887 and of the "Ateneo de Lima" in 1891.

She married the Colombian writer Elías de Losada Plissé in 1893, and they settled in New York City. Shortly after, she became a widow (1896). She retired back to her hometown where she dedicated herself to her son's education.

Among her work is "La Felicidad" (1887); "La literatura en la mujer" (1891); "Ensayos literarios" (1893); "El voto" (1923), short novel; "Poesías" (1928); "La madre Espinach, vidente y profetisa" (1933 y 1950); "Tragedia inédita" (1948); and "El jabón de hiel" (1949), which were stories inspired by traditions and legends of her hometown. In 1952 she wrote'Los Barzúas" which was a novel.

== Life ==
Amalia Natividad de las Mercedes Puga, was born in Cajamarca on 8 September 1866 to José Mercedes Puga y Valera and Carolina Puga Chávarri. During the War of the Pacific in April 1879, her father entered military service. In 1885, after a long period of rebellion against Miguel Iglesias, he was triumphantly entering Huamachuco, when he was shot and killed. Amalia was then still a teenager. Her distress over this first great tragedy was reflected in her essay "La Memoria" (1888) and in the poems "Gotas de Acíbar" (1888) and "Remembranzas" (1893).

Her mother was educated in the "Beaterio de las Shocllas", where she would later send Amalia. This bestowed on her faith and a respect for the rigid moral principles of Cajamarca society. She belonged to one of the families whose power is represented by the Spaniards and their descendants. They owned land, mines, commerce, and had access to secondary and higher education. There are marked socio-economic differences, a situation that was clearly noted in Amalia's writing.

Amalia made her debut as a writer in 1887, before she turned twenty one years old. She published in Lima a short article called "La felicidad" (Happiness). She also wrote for "El Perú Ilustrado" and the next year for "El Álbum de Trujillo". In 1890 she started writing for the "Revista Ilustrada de Nueva York" and the director of the periodical - Elías de Losada y Plissé - fell in love with her. In 1891 she was admitted in the "Ateneo de Lima" with a successful dissertation on "La Literatura en la Mujer" (Literature in Women). In 1891 the "Sociedad Amantes del Progreso de Cajamarca" admitted her unanimously as an honorary member.

In 1892 she won a contest promoted by Lima's Provincial Council with her poem "El Descubrimiento" (The discovery). In 1893 she married Enrique de Losada y Plissé and they moved to New York City. Amalia left writing to one side and barely published anything. It is a literary silence reflected in the sonnet "Flujo y Reflujo". Her only child, Cristóbal de Losada y Puga, was born in 1894; she dedicated to him, "A mi hijo en su infancia", and the sonnet "Íntimo", in which she offers her maternity. He later became a noted mathematician.

Her writing, just like the one of other authors of progressive ideology such as Mercedes Cabello and Clorinda Matto, lacks historic and political elements since none of these women see clearly their participation in the socio-political sphere. They consider social, military and political events as alien to the female essence (maternity).

By the time she's 30 she was widowed and with a child; she then decided to return to Cajamarca and, after a period of spiritual healing, she picked up writing again. In 1924, she wrote "Himno"; in 1925, Cajamarca's Provincial Council renamed Callao street with her name; in 1927 the "Editorial Cervantes" from Barcelona published her poems in the presentation of American women poets.

She spent the last forty years of her life in Lima, troubled by the 1930s coup conducted by Sánchez Cerro, and the political prosecution of the new ideologists such as Víctor Raúl Haya de la Torre and José Carlos Mariátegui. Amalia, who knew these types of situations, limited herself to writing exclusively about Cajamarca and is known as "La Puguita". In 1933 she published "La Madre Espinach, vidente y profetisa", which retakes the historical storytelling of Cajamarca. In 1937, she created and led the "Liga Femenil Pro-Diócesis de Cajamarca", and a year later the "Sociedad Obras de Vocaciones Sacerdotales de Cajamarca". The nine stories presented in her book "Tragedia Inédita" (1948) are about Cajamarca; "El jabón de hiel" (1949), is a compilation of 20 more stories previously published by periodicals in Lima such as "El Social", "El Renacimiento", "Correo de la Educación" and "La Unión de Pacasmayo", and the novel "Los Barzúas" (1952).

In 1960 the Government awarded her the Order of the Sun of Peru and her son Cristobal died, which plunged her into such deep pain that she completely abandoned writing. She died three years later.

== Works ==
- La felicidad (1887)
- La literatura en la mujer (1891)
- Ensayos literarios (1893)
- El voto (1923)
- Poesías (1928)
- La madre Espinach, vidente y profetisa (1933 y 1950)
- Tragedia inédita (1948)
- El jabón de hiel (1949)
- Los Barzúas (1952)
