= Cristóbal de Losada y Puga =

Minister of Education of Peru
- In office 12 January 1947 – 30 October 1947
- President: José Bustamante y Rivero
- Preceded by: Luis E. Valcárcel
- Succeeded by: Óscar Torres M.

Personal details
- Born: 14 April 1894 New York, U.S.
- Died: 30 August 1961 (aged 67) Lima, Peru
- Spouse: María Luisa Marrou y Correa
- Children: 4
- Parents: Enrique Cristóbal de Losada Plissé (father); Amalia Natividad Puga y Puga (mother)
- Education: National University of Engineering; National University of San Marcos
- Occupation: Mathematician, mining engineer, academic
- Awards: Civil Order of Alfonso X, the Wise

Cristóbal de Losada y Puga (14 April 1894 – 30 August 1961) was a Peruvian mathematician and mining engineer. He was Minister of Education of Peru in the government of José Luis Bustamante y Rivero and Director of the National Library of Peru between 1948 and 1961.

== Biography ==
He was born in New York, son of Enrique Cristóbal de Losada Plissé and Amalia Natividad Puga y Puga. He was two years old when, in 1896, his father died so he was taken back to Peru and settled in Cajamarca, the land of his mother's family. There he attended his primary and secondary studies.

In 1913 he went to Lima to study at the National School of Engineers (now the National University of Engineering), obtaining his title of Mining Engineer in 1919. His first professional work was with the Corps of Mining Engineers, until 1923.

He was also admitted in the Faculty of Sciences of the National University of San Marcos. In 1922, he graduated with a bachelor's degree and later in 1923 he obtained his diploma as a doctor of mathematical sciences from this institution, with a thesis "On rolling curves".

He dedicated himself to teaching. In the Chorrillos Military School he was professor of Arithmetic, Descriptive Geometry and Elemental Mechanics (1920–1926 and 1931–1940). In the Faculty of Sciences of San Marcos he was Professor of Differential and Integral Calculation (1924–1926), and of Calculation of Probabilities and Mathematical Physics (1935–1939). In the National School of Engineers he was professor of Rational Mechanics, Resistance of Materials and Infinitesimal Calculation (1930–1931), work that exerted until the closing of the School for political reasons.

In 1924 he was a speaker at the International Congress of Mathematicians in Toronto. In 1931 he assumed the presidency of the National Society of Industries.

In 1933 he became a professor at the Faculty of Science and Engineering at the Pontifical Catholic University of Peru, where he taught Analytical Geometry, Infinitesimal Calculation, Mechanics and Resistance of Materials, until 1953. He became dean of the Faculty (1939–1946 and 1948–1950. He was also director of the Magazine of the Catholic University (1938–1945) and even came to serve as prorector (1941–1946).

President José Luis Bustamante y Rivero summoned him to serve as Minister of Public Education, he served in this role from January 12 to October 30, 1947.

On July 12, 1948, he was appointed Director of the National Library of Peru, a position in which he remained until his death. During his long period at the head of that institution he directed the Fénix magazine.

He was a member of the National Academy of Exact, Physical and Natural Sciences of Peru, of the Peruvian Association for the Progress of Science and of the Peruvian Academy of Language. He was also a member to the Royal Academy of Physical and Natural Sciences of Madrid, the Royal Spanish Mathematical Society, the French Physical Society and the American Mathematical Association of America.

He married María Luisa Marrou y Correa, he was the father of five children.

== Works ==
- Curso de Análisis matemático (3 volumes, 1945–1954)
- Las anomalías de la gravedad: su interpretación geológica, sus aplicaciones mineras (1917; aumentada en 1920)
- Contribución a la teoría matemática de las clépsidras y de los filtros (1922)
- Sobre las curvas de rodadura (1923)
- Mecánica racional (1930)
- Curso de Cálculo Infinitesimal (1938)
- Teoría y técnica de la fotoelastisimetría (1941)
- Galileo (1942)
- Copérnico (1943)

== Bibliography ==
- Basadre Grohmann, Jorge (2005). Historia de la República del Perú (1822–1933). 8 (in Spanish). Lima: Producciones Cantabria. pp. 179–180. ISBN 9972-205-70-3.
- Tauro del Pino, Alberto (2001). Enciclopedia Ilustrada del Perú. 10 (in Spanish) (3rd ed.). Lima: PEISA. ISBN 9972-40-159-6.
