= Provincial Municipality of Cusco =

Provincial Municipality of Cusco Municipalidad Provincial del Cusco
- Provincial Municipality
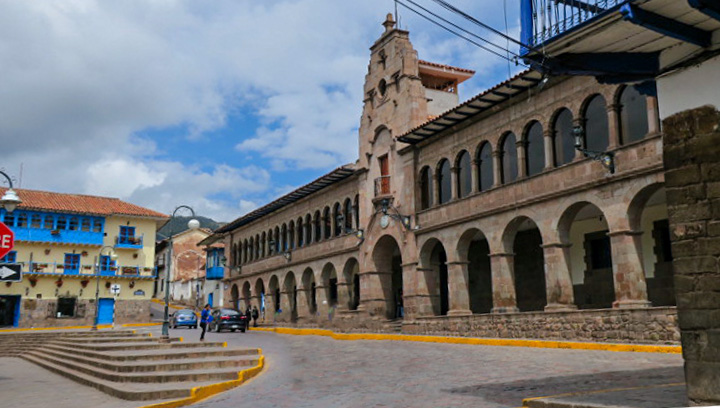
- Cusco City Hall

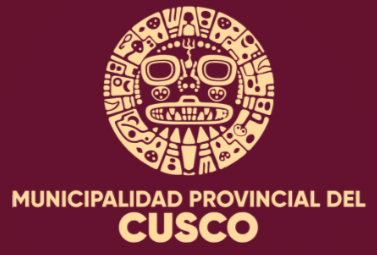
- Seal

- Location of Cusco Province in the Cusco Region
- Country: Peru
- Region: Cusco
- Founded: June 21, 1925
- Seat: Palacio del Cabildo de Cuzco

Government
  - Type: Municipality
  - Mayor: Luis Pantoja Calvo
  - Council: Concejo Municipal del Cusco
- Demonym(s): Cusqueño, -ña
- Website: cusco.gob.pe

The Provincial Municipality of Cusco is the local governing body of the Cusco Province and the Cusco district. Its headquarters are located in the city of Cusco, which serves as the capital of the province.

== History ==
During the Spanish foundation of Cusco, Francisco Pizarro established the first council and appointed Beltrán de Castro and Captain Pedro de Candia as mayors, handing each of them their respective varas of justice, along with the aldermen. Since then, the Cabildo del Cusco became the local governing body of the city and the surrounding area. After the end of the colonial period, the new republic decided that its local organization would depend on the structure established during the viceroyalty, using intendancies to form the new departments of Peru. Thus, the Intendancy of Cuzco led to the current Department of Cusco, and the old districts gave rise to the contemporary provinces.

In the case of Cusco, on June 21, 1825, Simón Bolívar issued a decree creating the Cusco Province and establishing a municipality in it, which, in accordance with the provisions of the Constitution of 1823, would be elected by electoral colleges. However, the following year, the For-Life Constitution imposed by the Venezuelan dictator abolished councils and municipalities, which were reintroduced by the Constitution of 1828. Municipalities would be suppressed again in the constitution of 1839 and restored in the one of 1856.

The Constitution of 1920 regulated for the first time the election of municipal authorities, although it was only in 1963, under the Constitution of 1933, that the first popular election for municipal authorities took place in Peru. Until then, the position was directly appointed by the government and had much less importance than the figure of the Prefect of Cusco, who represented the executive power in the department. An example of this was the appointment of the American citizen Albert Giesecke as mayor of Cusco in the 1920s. The first elected mayor was Alfredo Díaz Quintanilla, who won the municipal elections of 1963 as a candidate of the Alliance Acción Popular-Democracia Cristiana. The elections were suspended with the arrival of the Revolutionary Government of the Armed Forces and would not resume until 1980.

== Organization ==
The government organs of the Provincial Municipality of Cusco are:

- the Council (El Concejo Municipal);
- the Mayor of Cusco (La Alcaldía);

== Function and powers ==
According to Article 2 its Regulation of Organization and Functions, the Provincial Municipality of Cusco exerts jurisdiction, in matters within its competence, on the districts of Cusco, Ccorca, Poroy, Santiago, San Sebastián, San Jerónimo, Saylla and Wanchaq.
