= Santurantikuy =

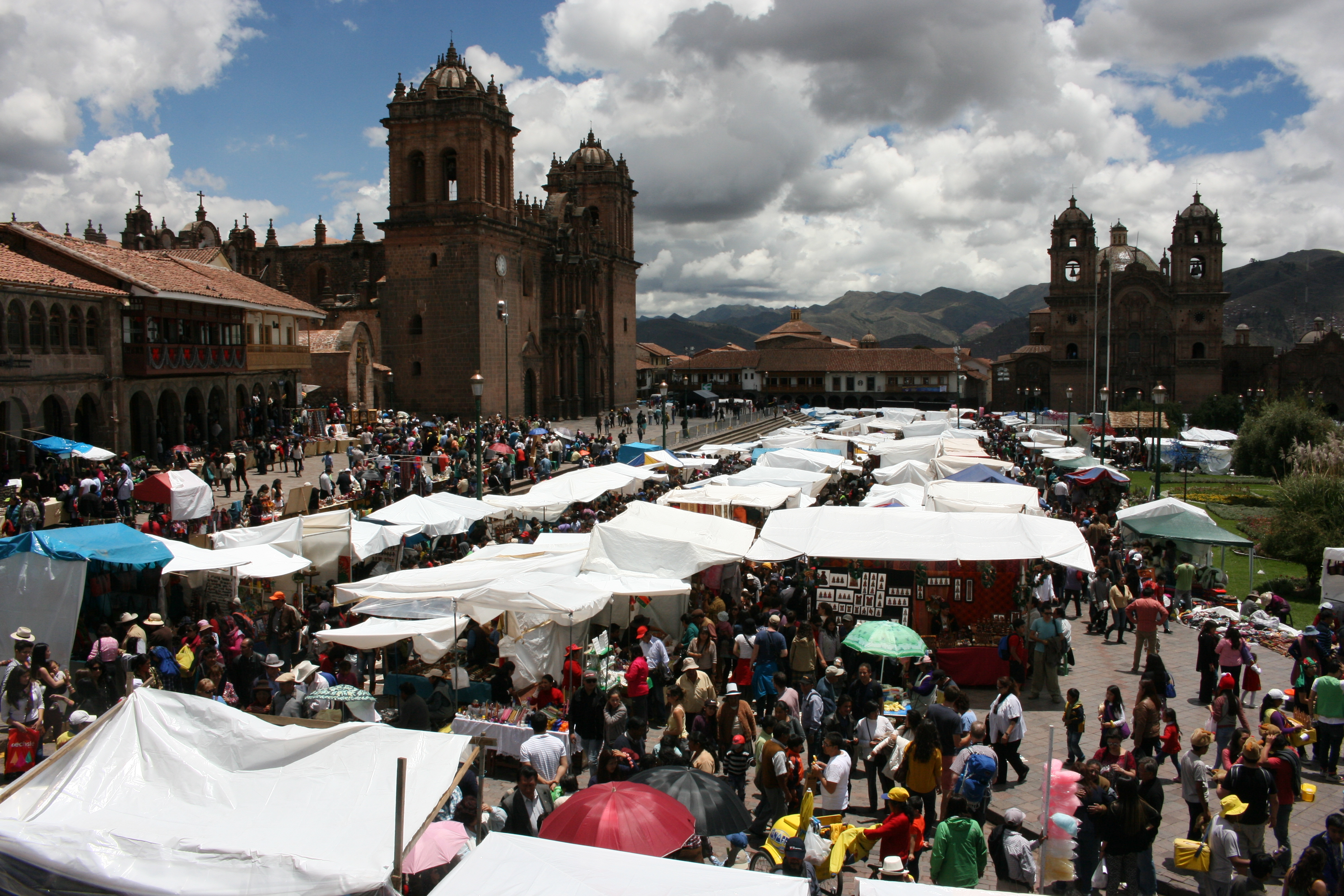
Santurantikiy fair in December 2014

Santurantikuy (Quechua santu saint (a borrowing from Spanish santo), rantikuy to buy something only for oneself, "to buy oneself a saint") is a craft fair held annually on December 24 in the central square of the city of Cusco in Peru. The National Institute of Culture declared the event a National Cultural Heritage by Resolución Directoral National No. 1406/INC-2009.

== See also ==
- Warachikuy
