= Aya Huma =

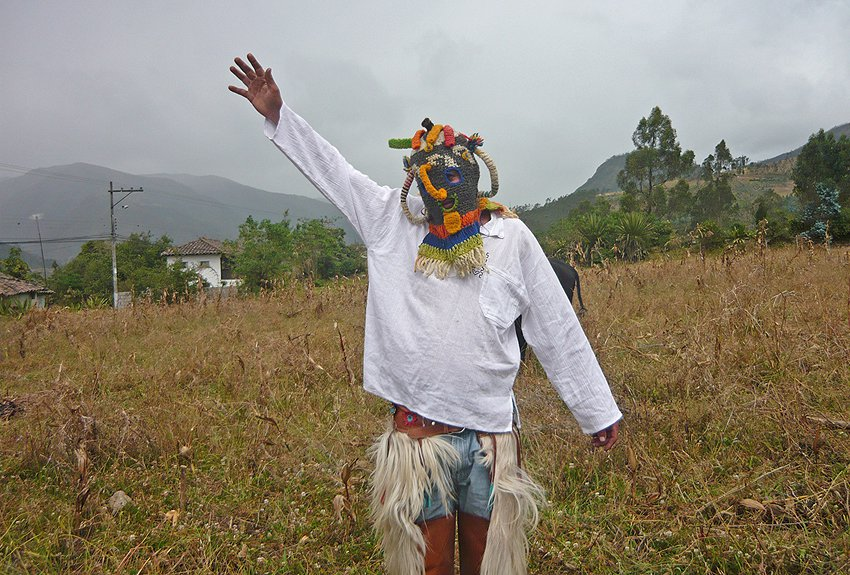
"Aya Uma" dancer

Aya Huma, Diablo Huma in Spanish, or K-Ay in Caranqui is a figure in Ecuadorian indigenous culture. Its origins lie in Caranqui mythology, which recounts a journey of initiation. Colloquially in Ecuador, the figure is described as a being who bathed in a waterfall for three days to strike a pact with the devil, thereby acquiring the power and fighting skills needed for the contests they must undertake. The name Diablo Huma in spanish links the figure to Cañari mythology and the initiation rites associated with the practice of Catequil Today, the Aya Huma part of traditional dances in festivals; his popularity has spread to other regions, leading to the use of this symbol in various contexts such as representing Ecuadorian folklore, the connection to nature, and the Equator due to the mask's two faces, designed so as never to turn away from the sun. Solar symbolism and its relationship with the Equator are very common in the country; such as the eight-pointed star representing the "direct sun" shining over the Equator as depicted in both informal settings and state emblems. The costume worn to portray the figure consists of a long-sleeved cotton shirt (either white or black) hand-embroidered with Andean iconographic motifs, along with jeans covered by zamarros (traditional leather chaps); leather boots are generally worn as footwear. The character's most distinctive feature is the double-faced mask. According to oral tradition, each face represents a phase of the day: daytime and night time. The mask features 12 horns, symbolizing the months of the year.

== History ==
=== Myth, Ritual and Dance ===
The figure as an energetic life force, is linked to the sacred nature of water among the Caranquis. Studies of their mythology have identified *PI*—meaning "sacred water"—as the fundamental philosophical principle of Caranqui mythology. This form of worship was shared by other ethnic chiefdoms across the Ecuadorian territory that centered their rituals on water—whether through the Manteño people's veneration of the sea or the worship of springs dedicated to the deity Catequil by the Puruhá, Quitu, and Caranqui peoples. These rituals took place within the context of Catequil worship and the initiation rite of the catequillado (the person performing the ritual). Although there are formally seven official springs associated with Catequil, known as Catequilla. This practice was also carried out at other sites, such as lakes and waterfalls; these locations served as sacred portals where the deity resided and with which the catequillado established a connection. It is likely through syncretism with Catholic tradition that the figure received the name diablo huma or diabluma. The mask has two faces conveying a sort of dualism between light and dark. In the provinces of Pichincha and Imbabura, the beech tree is said to represent the power of nature, the sun, and the darkness of the underworld. The term "huma" means head and is linked to the idea of leadership and governance.
