= Colcampata =

Archaeological site in Peru

Coordinates: 13.5129°S 71.9797°W

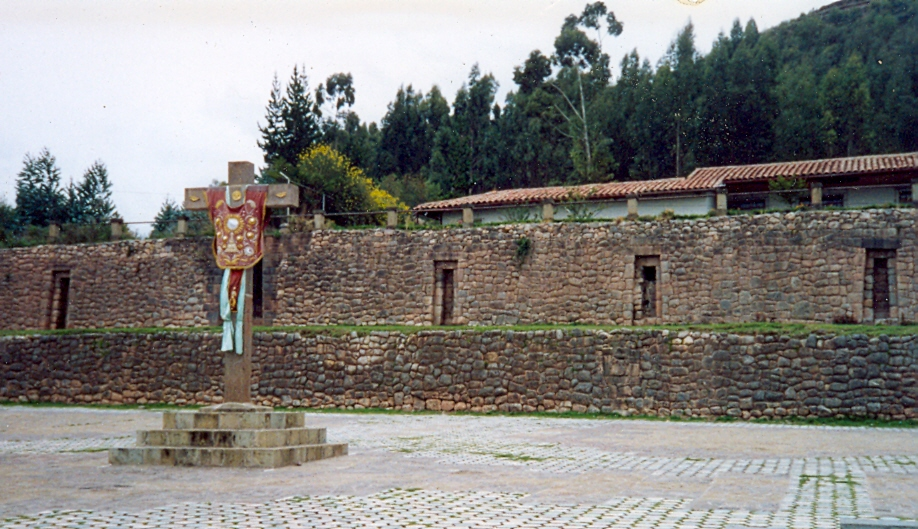
- Wall at Colcampata
- Interactive map of Colcampata
- Cultures: Inca
- Location: Peru
- Region: Cusco Region, Cusco Province

Colcampata (Quechua qullqa, qulqa deposit, -n a suffix, pata elevated place / above, at the top / edge, bank (of a river), shore) is an archaeological site in Peru. It is situated in the Cusco Region, Cusco Province, Cusco District.

The site was declared a National Cultural Heritage of Peru by R.D N°1128-2004-INC.

== See also ==
- Saksaywaman
