= Albert Giesecke =

American teacher, "A Philadelphian in the Land of the Incas"

Albert A. Giesecke
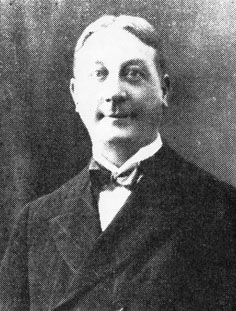
- Portrait of Albert Giesecke, c. 1920

Rector of the National University of San Antonio Abad in Cuzco
- In office 1910–1923
- Preceded by: Eliseo Araujo
- Succeeded by: Eufracio Álvarez

Mayor of Cusco
- In office 1920–1923
- President: Augusto B. Leguía

Personal details
- Born: November 30, 1883 Philadelphia, United States
- Died: September 7, 1968 (aged 84) Miraflores, Lima, Peru
- Spouse: Esther Matto Usandivaras
- Children: Esther and Alberto Antonio
- Parent(s): Albert F. Giesecke and Catalina P. de Giesecke
- Education: University of Pennsylvania; Cornell University (PhD)
- Occupation: Teacher, Public official

Albert Anthony Giesecke (Philadelphia, United States, November 30, 1883 – Miraflores, Lima, Peru, September 7, 1968) was an American teacher who came to Peru contracted by the government of that country. He was entrusted with the rectorship of the National University of San Antonio Abad in Cuzco, where he carried out a significant reform (1910–1923). He also served as the mayor of Cusco.

== Biography ==
He was the son of Albert Frederick Giesecke (German immigrant) and Catalina Elizabeth Partheymüller de Giesecke. He studied Economics and Administration at the University of Pennsylvania and at Cornell University. He graduated with a Doctor of Philosophy and Jurisprudence; he traveled to Europe and attended courses at the universities of Berlin, Lausanne, and London. Upon returning to the United States, he began his teaching career at Cornell (1906–1908) and Pennsylvania (1908). He also worked as a researcher at the British Museum and in the Department of Statistics of the United States Federal Government.

The Peruvian government, through the Ministry of Justice and Instruction, then headed by Manuel Vicente Villarán, commissioned Francisco García Calderón to search in the United States for competent educators to hire them within the framework of the modernization plan of Peruvian education. Leo Rowe, a professor at the University of Pennsylvania, recommended one of his former students, Giesecke, who was then 26 years old.

Giesecke arrived in Lima on July 9, 1909, temporarily joining the Colegio Nacional Nuestra Señora de Guadalupe with the mission of developing its commercial section and thus collaborating in the vocational reform of secondary education. However, the government had a more ambitious task reserved for him: the reform of university studies. Thus, in 1910, President Augusto B. Leguía appointed him rector of the reopened National University of San Antonio Abad del Cusco, which had been closed the previous year. The fact that he was a foreigner and very young raised not a few criticisms. Giesecke took charge of the chairs of Economic Sciences and Law, and carried out a fundamental reform, bringing the university into the realm of modernity. He introduced new teaching methods and techniques, as well as sports practices among his students. He organized the Archaeological Museum, supported archaeological work, promoted sociological studies of the region, and conducted a census of Cuzco, with the support of his students. He carried out his work amid an unusual atmosphere of camaraderie with the professors and students.

Simultaneously with his teaching work, he was a member of the municipal council (1912–1923) and of the Society of Public Charity. He even became mayor (1920–1923), and in that capacity, he was concerned with paving the main streets, installing sanitary services, and building the access road to the ruins of Sacsayhuamán.

He married the Cusco lady María Esther Matto Usandivaras (a relative of the writer Clorinda Matto de Turner), with whom he had two children: Esther Catalina and Alberto Antonio.

In 1923, he left the Cusco rectorate and, called by the government, moved to Lima in 1924, to take up the position of Director General of Education at the Ministry of Justice and Instruction, a position he held until 1930. He was also a consultant to the Plebiscitary Commission of Tacna and Arica (1925–1926) and director of the Institute of Education at the National University of San Marcos (1931–1932). At this university, he taught a course in History of Education (1940–1942). Attached to the embassy of the United States, as a civilian attaché, he favored good understanding with Peru.

== Publications ==
- Guide to Cuzco (1923).
- The Plebiscites in History, with a Summary of the Tacna and Arica Issue (1924).

He also published numerous popular articles on Peruvian Archaeology and Geography.
