= Cusco District =

Coordinates: 13.5261°S 71.9713°W

Cusco Qusqu
- District
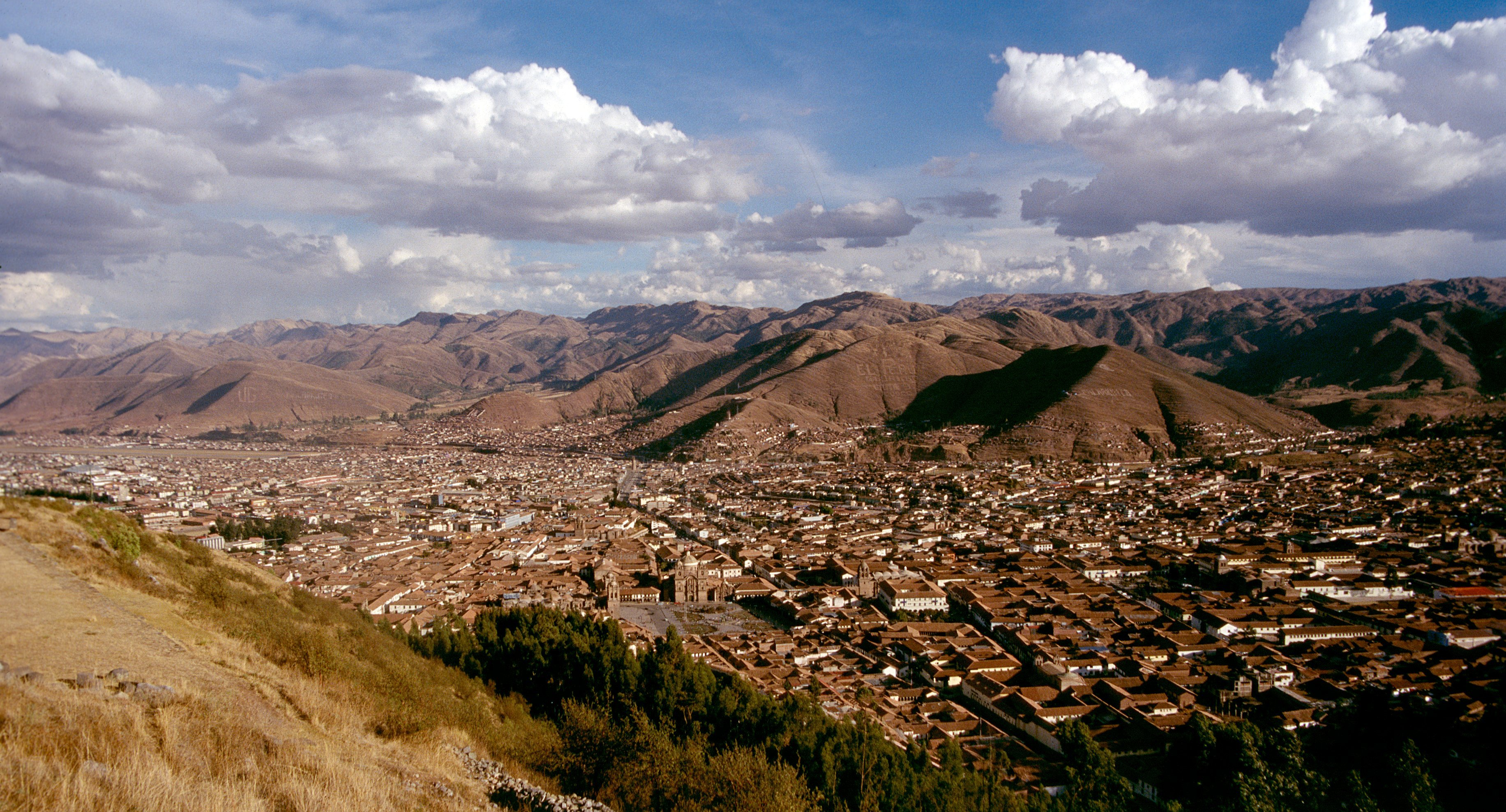
- Panorama view

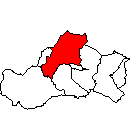
- Location of Cusco in the Cusco province
- Country: Peru
- Region: Cusco
- Province: Cusco
- Founded: 1821
- Capital: Cusco
- Subdivisions: 4 populated centers

Government
  - Mayor: Víctor Boluarte (2019-2022)

Area
  - Total: 116.22 km^{2} (44.87 sq mi)
- Elevation: 3,399 m (11,152 ft)

Population (2025 census)
  - Total: 102,111
  - Density: 878.60/km^{2} (2,275.6/sq mi)
- Time zone: UTC-5 (PET)
- Website: municusco.gob.pe

Cusco is a district in the northern Cusco Province within the Cusco Region of Peru. It is bordered by districts of Ccorca and Poroy on the west, the provinces of Anta, the Calca, and Urubamba on the north, the San Jerónimo District on the east, and the districts of Santiago and San Sebastián to the south.

== Geography ==
One of the highest peaks of the district is Sinqa at 4,423 m (14,511 ft). Other mountains are listed below:

- Champa Kancha
- Ichhu K'uchu
- Muña Urqu
- Puka Muqu
- Puka Qaqa
- Quyqu
- Sirk'a
- Sirk'a Pata
- Wanakawri (Calca-Cusco)
- Wayna K'urkur
- Yana Qaqa

== See also ==
- Amaru Marka Wasi
- Qullqanpata
- Santurantikuy
- Warachikuy
