= Wayna Tawqaray =

Archaeological site in Peru

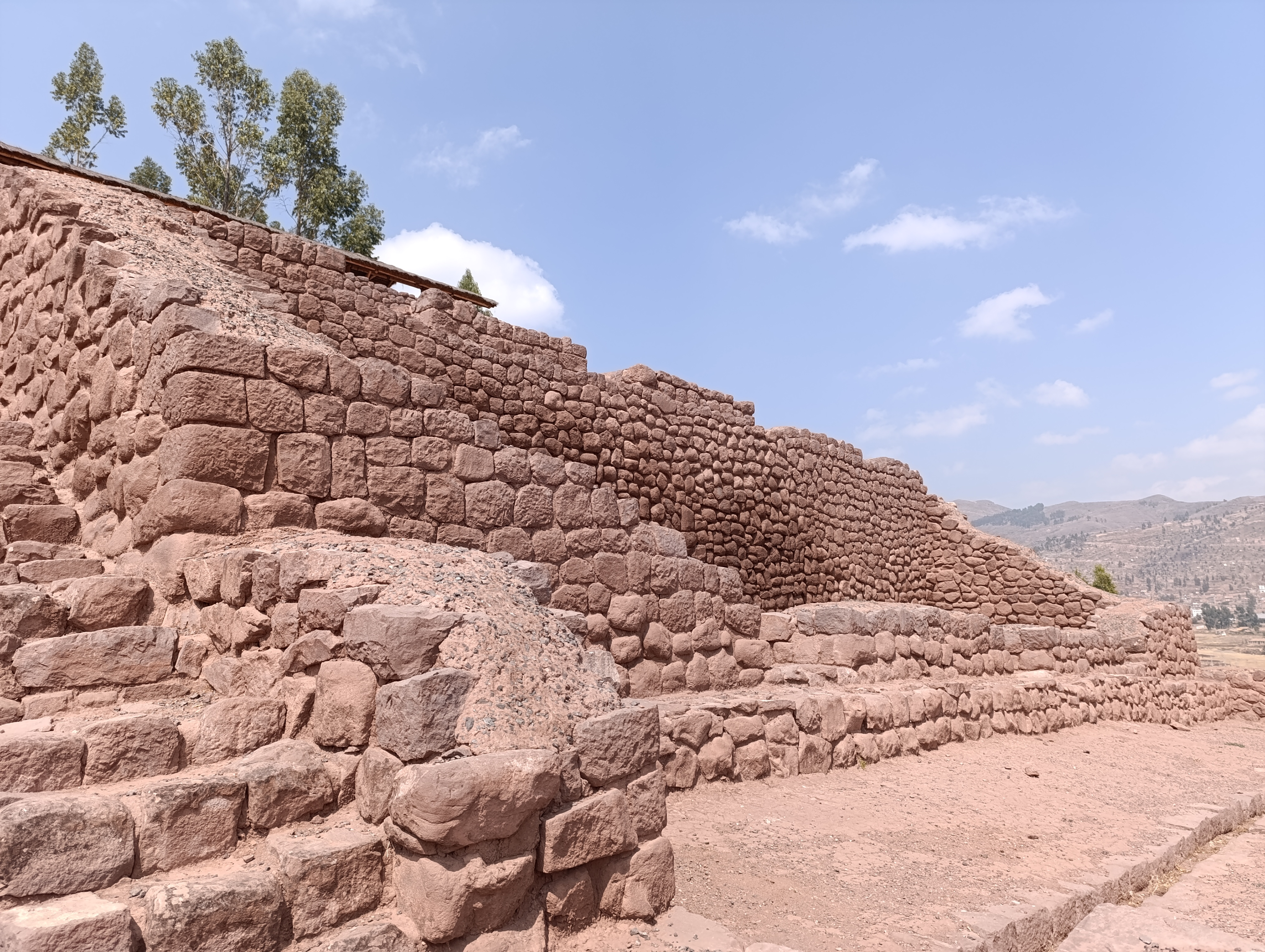
- Looking southeast across Cusco and San Sebastián towards the mountain Tawqaray (center). Wayna Tawqaray is visible on its slope. Muyu Urqu is on the right.
- Interactive map of Wayna Tawqaray
- 13°32′40″S 71°56′19″W
- Location: Peru, Cusco Region, Cusco Province
- Region: Andes

Site notes
- Height: 3,600 metres (11,811 ft)

Wayna Tawqaray (Quechua wayna young, young man, tawqaray heap, pile, also spelled Wayna Taucaray) is an archaeological site in Peru. It is located in the Cusco Region, Cusco Province, San Sebastián District, about 5 km southeast of the center of Cusco. Wayna Tawqaray is situated at a height of about 3,600 metres (11,811 ft) on the slope of the mountain Tawqaray (Taucaray). The mountain with the archaeological remains lies southeast of the mountain Araway Qhata and the hill Muyu Urqu, above the river Watanay.

== See also ==
- Inkill Tampu
- Pumamarka
- Rumiwasi
- Wanakawri
