= Muyu Urqu =

Archaeological site in Peru

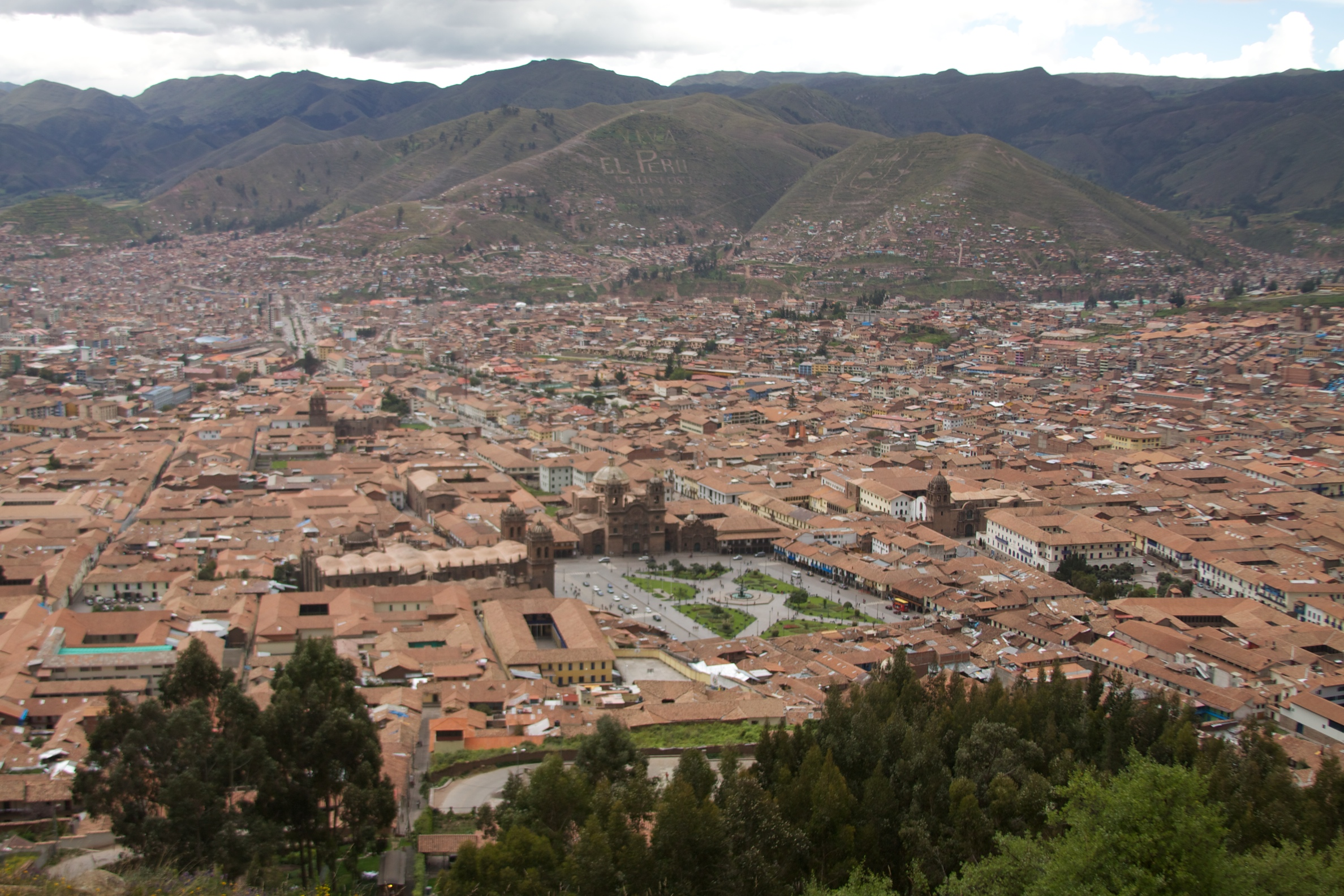
- A view of Cusco and the mountains southeast of it. Muyu Urqu is the lowest hill on the left.

Highest point
- Elevation: 3,400 m (11,200 ft)
- Coordinates: 13°32′33″S 71°57′23″W

Naming
- Language of name: Quechua

Geography
- Location within Peru
- Location: Peru, Cusco Region, Cusco Province
- Parent range: Andes

Muyu Urqu (Quechua muyu circle, urqu mountain, "circle mountain", Hispanicized spellings Muyuorco, Muyuorcco, Muyu Orcco, Muyu Orco, also Muyu Orqo, Muyuorqo, Muyu Urqo) is an archaeological site and a prominent hill in Peru. It is situated in the Cusco Region, Cusco Province, Santiago District, east of the mountain Araway Qhata, at the right bank of Watanay River. The mountain with the archaeological remains is about 3,400 metres (11,155 ft) high.

== See also ==
- Anawarkhi
- Araway Qhata
- Pachatusan
- Pikchu
- Pillku Urqu
- Pumamarka
- Sinqa
- Wanakawri
