= Cheqollo =

Archaeological site in Peru

- Ch'iqullu
- Interactive map of Cheqollo
- Location: Peru, Cusco Region, Cusco Province
- Region: Andes

Cheqollo (Quechua for nightingale) is an archaeological site in Peru. It is located in the Cusco Region, Cusco Province, San Jerónimo District, north of San Jerónimo. The site was declared a National Cultural Heritage (Patrimonio Cultural) by Resolucion Directorial Nacional No. 514/ 2003.

== See also ==
- Pachatusan
- Wanakawri
- Waqutu
