= Qullqapampa =

Archaeological site in Peru

- Cultures: Inca
- Location: Cusco Region, Cusco Province, Peru

Designations
- Designation: National Cultural Heritage of Peru

Qullqapampa (Quechua qullqa, qulqa deposit, storehouse, pampa a large plain, Hispanicized spellings Colcabamba, Colcapampa) is an archaeological site in Peru. It is situated in the Cusco Region, Cusco Province, San Sebastián District.

The National Institute of Culture declared the site a National Cultural Heritage of Peru by R.D.N. No. 1128/INC - 2005.

== See also ==
- Inkill Tampu
- Pumamarka
- Rumiwasi
