= Wánchaq Station =

Train station in Cusco, Peru

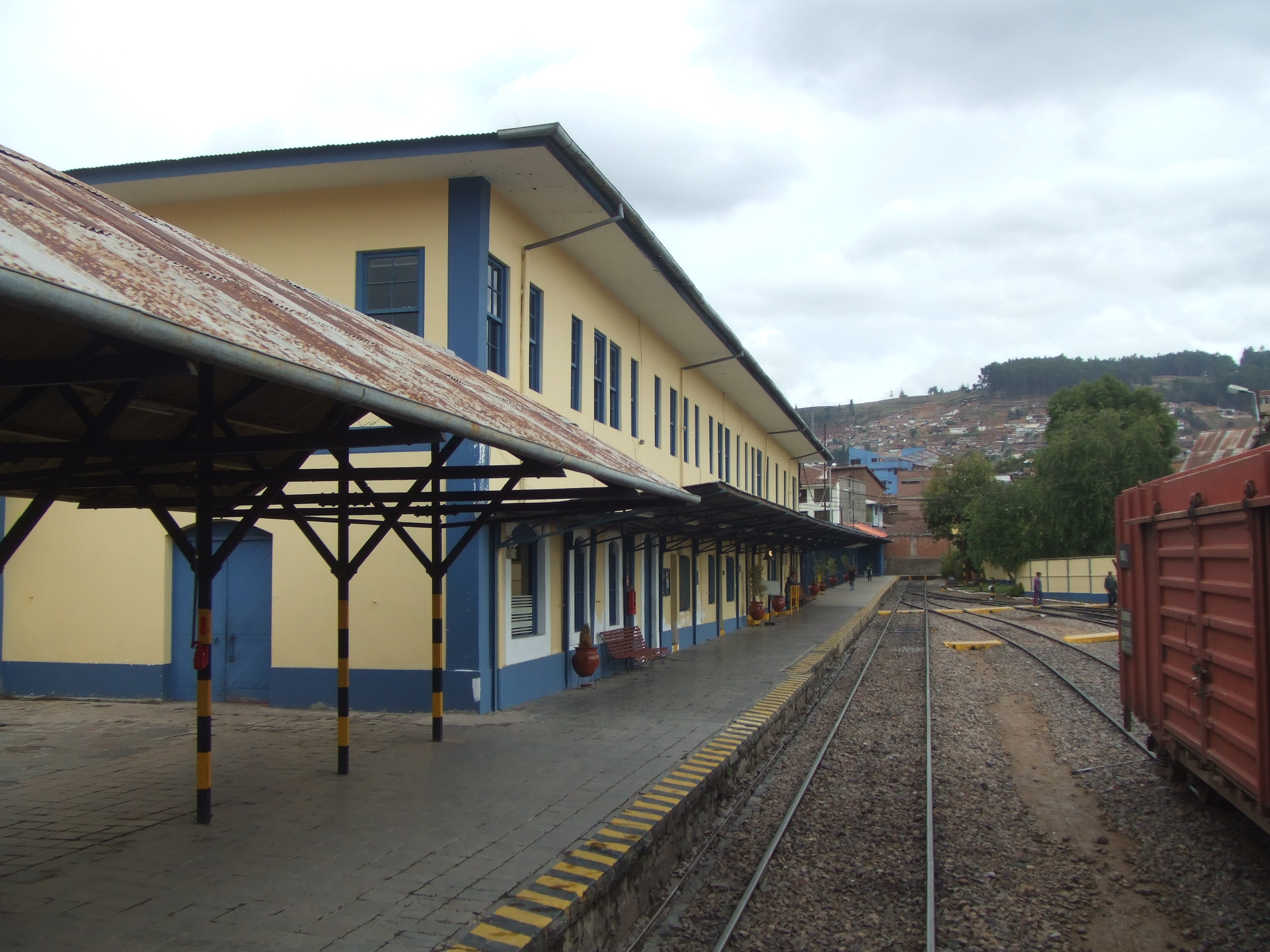
- Platform of Wánchaq Station

General information
- Location: Jirón Pachacútec cuadra 3 s/n, Wánchaq, Cusco; Peru
- Coordinates: 13.525245°S 71.971331°W
- Line: Southern Railway
- Platforms: 1

History
- Opened: 1908
Location

The Wánchaq Station is a train station located in the city of Cusco, Peru. It serves as the terminus of the Southern Branch of the Southern Railway, from where services depart towards the cities of Juliaca, Puno, and Arequipa.

The station is located at the end of Avenida El Sol in the Pumacchupan area at the eastern limit of what was the ancient urban center of the Inca city. Its name is derived from the district it is located in.

== History ==
At the beginning of the Republican Era of Cusco, the city of Cusco remained one of the most important cities in the south of the country but experienced a process of decline due, among other reasons, to its isolation in relation to the coast and the city of Lima. At the end of the 19th century, when the construction of the Southern Railway began, communication through this railway with the coast was proposed; however, the section that would connect Cusco with the city of Juliaca was halted in 1875 due to economic difficulties. In 1890, its construction resumed but was halted again in 1894, having only reached the city of Sicuani. It was not until 1908 that the construction of the railway to Cusco was completed, also due to the resistance of the regional oligarchy who preferred that the railway not pass through this city but instead traverse the Urubamba Valley to the La Convención Province.

On September 13, 1908, the railway made its entrance to the city at the newly constructed Huánchac station (previous spelling of the name) built especially for this network.

== Current operations ==
Since September 1999, the station has been concessioned to the company Ferrocarril Trasandino. PeruRail's Titicaca and Vistadome Observatory trains operate from Wánchaq.
