= Quespewara =

Coordinates: 13°29′48.37″S 71°59′38.05″W

Qhespehuara
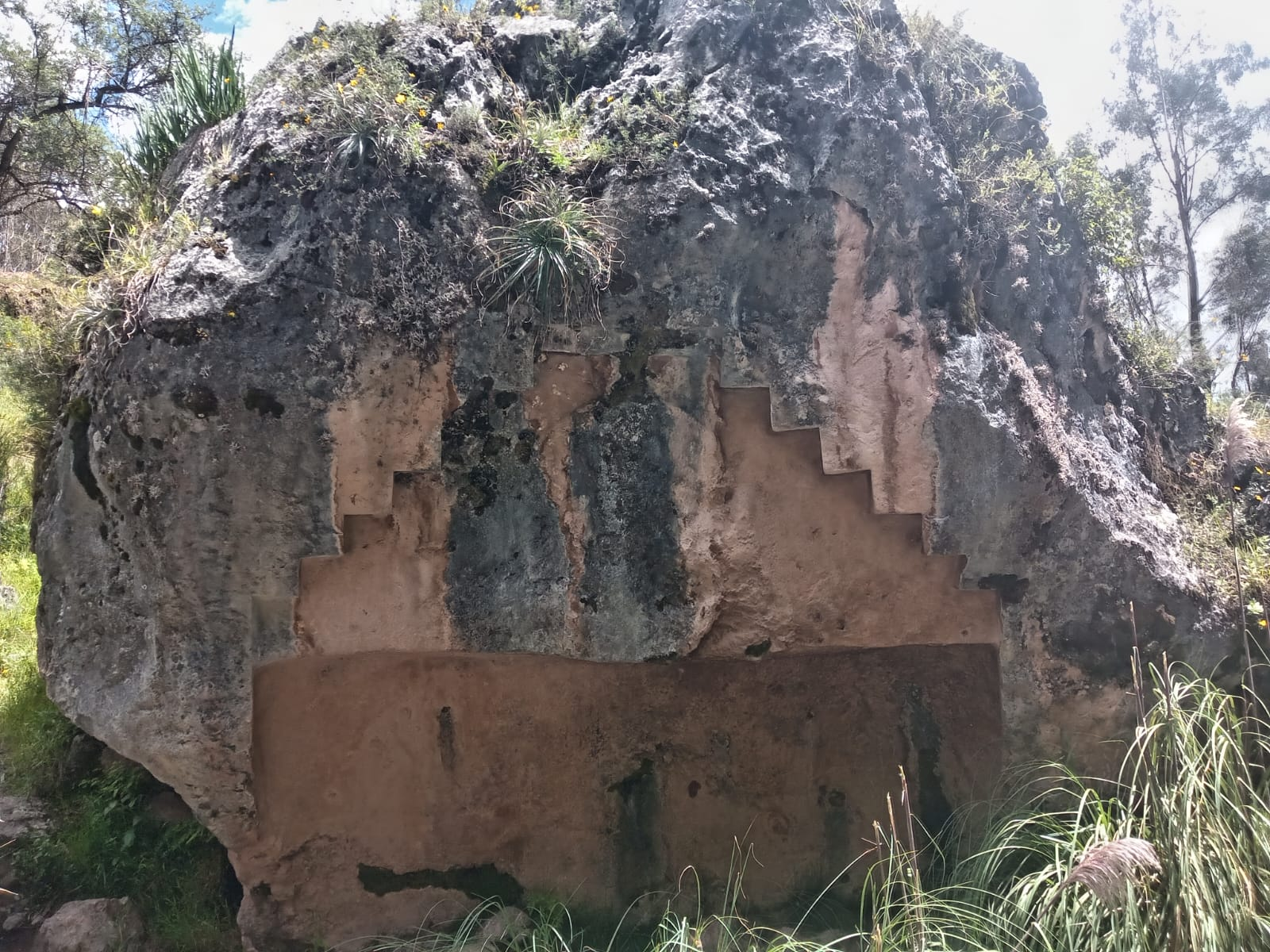
- Qhespehuara archaeological site
- Interactive map of Qhespehuara
- Cultures: Inca
- Location: Peru
- Region: Cusco Region
- Part of: Sacsayhuamán Archaeological Park

Qhespehuara or Qespewara (Quechua, Hispanicized spellings quespewara), is an archaeological site within the Saqsaywaman Archaeological Park, located just 3 km north of Cusco's main square. It sits at an altitude of 3,565 meters and is strategically positioned in the northwestern Cusco Valley, bordering the Anta and Ccorao valleys.

Hydrographically, the site is defined by its location on the left bank of the Saphy River and the middle stretch of the Chakan River. It is surrounded by three prominent mountains: Saqsaywaman, Senqa, and Fortaleza.

The designated site covers an area of approximately 10,115.17 m^{2} and features agricultural terraces, carved rocks, and ancient river channeling. Its boundaries are marked by natural features—Qhespihuara and Chakan hills to the north and west, and the Chakán River to the south—while the eastern border adjoins the private Llaullipata estate. Qhespehuara is surrounded by three mountains in Cusco; these mountains are: Saqsayhuaman: 3565 m.a.s.l. Senqa: 4438 m.a.s.l. Fortaleza: 4019 m.a.s.l.

== Geological description ==
Saqsaywaman has a very rugged topography, with plateaus and mountains. Elevated areas such as Senqa and Bandorani, micro-basins, and deep ravines are formed mainly by the Chakán River, which descends from Salkantay mountain at 4,200 meters above sea level (m.a.s.l.) to 3,400 masl, where the Shapy River is formed.

The geology of Saqsaywaman is composed of the Yuncaypata Formation, a limestone formation encompassing Chinchero, Saqsaywaman, Kusilluchayoq, San Sebastián, Qenqo, and Laqo. This formation dates back to the Cretaceous period and is 80 million years old. It is of marine origin, as evidenced by the presence of fossils such as sea urchins and lamellibranch shells (Kalafatovich 1970).

== Significance ==
=== Water ===
Researchers like Sherbondy, Flórez, and Rodríguez demonstrate that water sources (especially the Chakán canal) were not just for irrigation but were state-controlled sanctuaries tied to royal lineages, ceremonial practices, and water worship.

=== Carved rocks as sacred markers ===
Studies by Prada, Gullberg, and Quispe show that carved rocks functioned as territorial markers, mediators between the mortal and supernatural worlds, and astronomical tools used to track solstices and equinoxes for regulating agricultural cycles.

=== Site functions ===
Excavations at sites such as Suchuna Qocha, Chakan, and Qespiwara reveal that these locations served multiple purposes: Ceremonial centers, funerary sites, unfinished constructions, oracle huacas, and hydraulic installations.

== Gallery ==
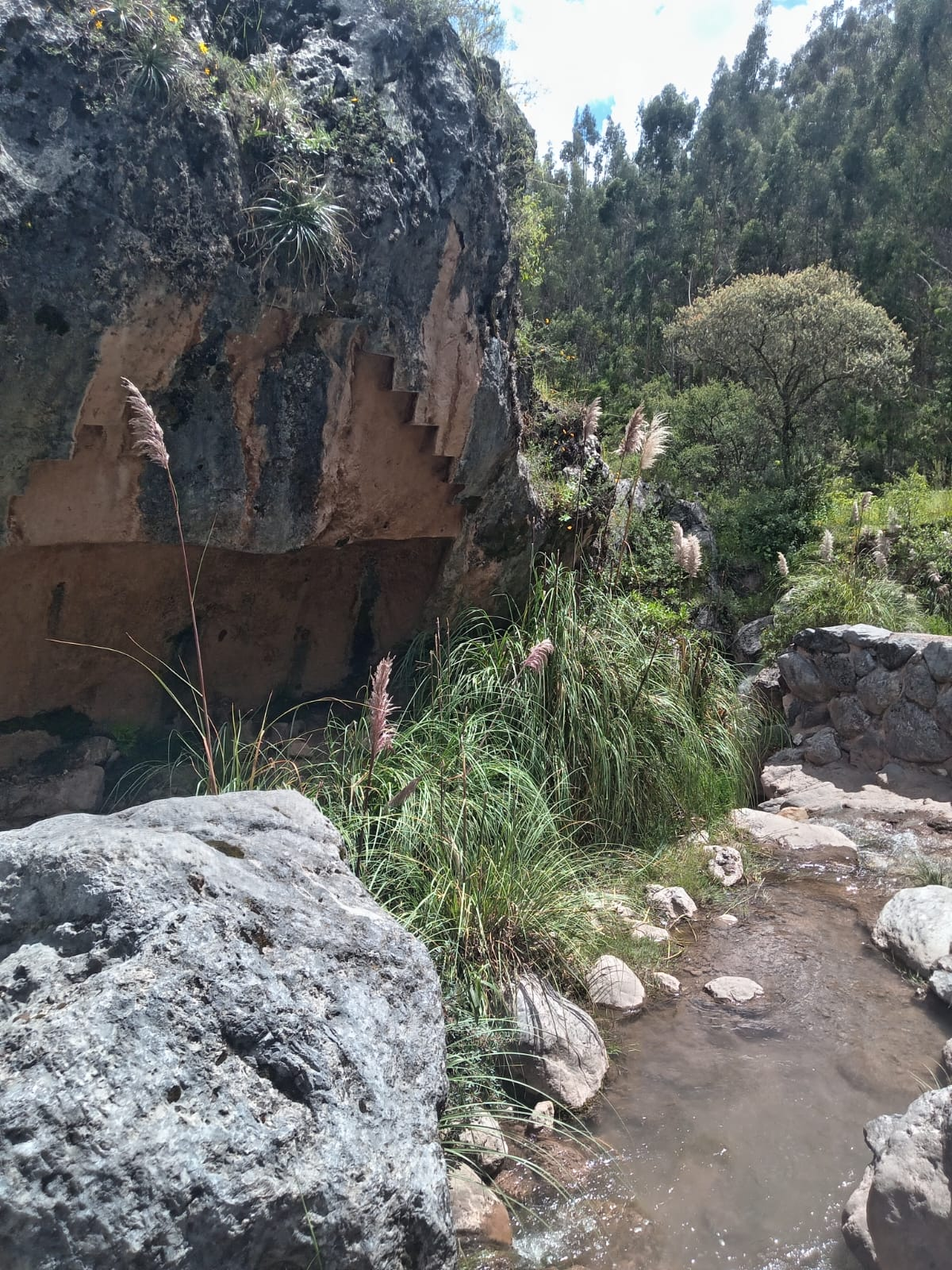
Quespehuara bedrock

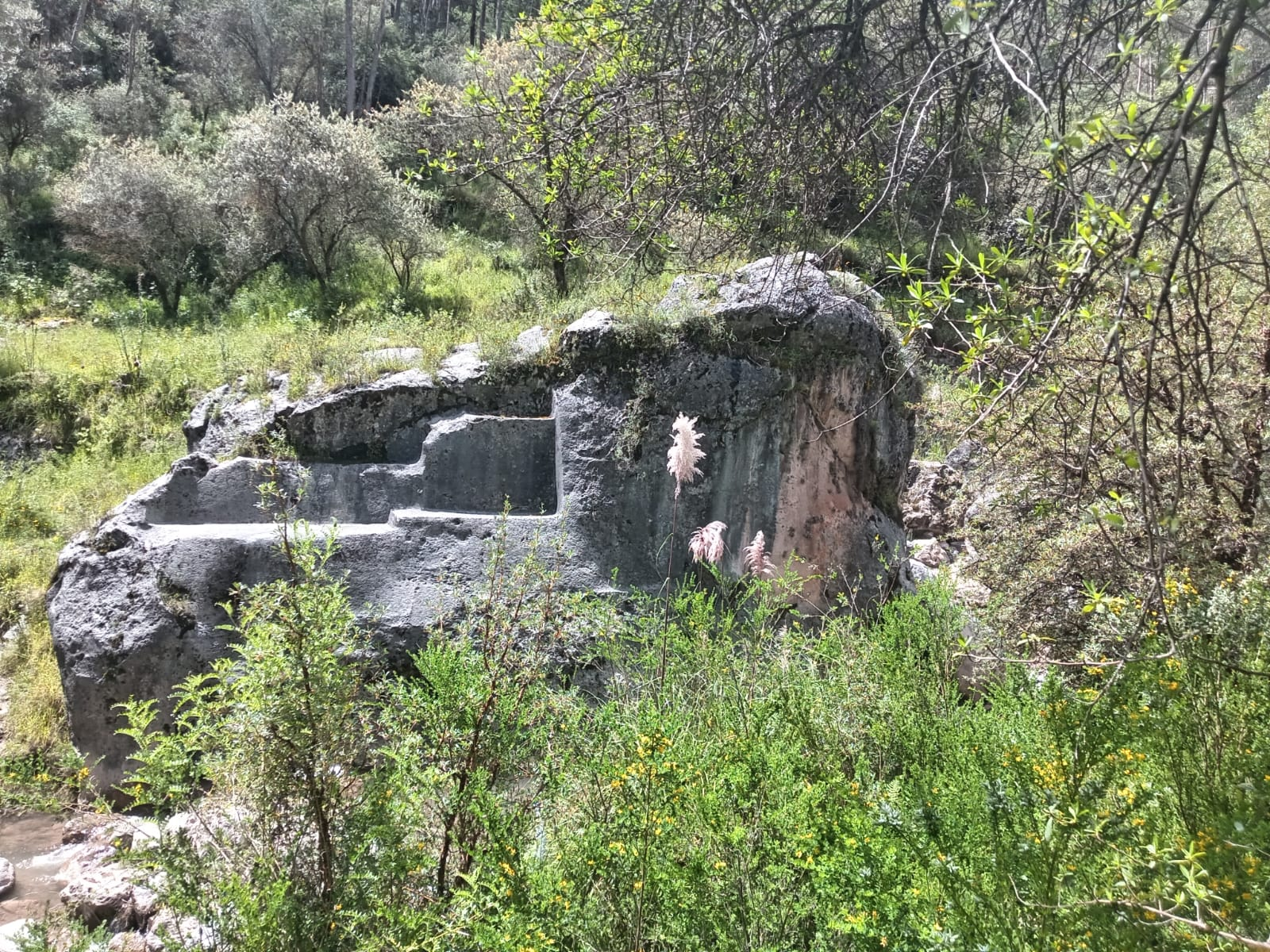
Carved seat on the outcrop rock (on the center) surrounded with saplings and Andean vegetation.

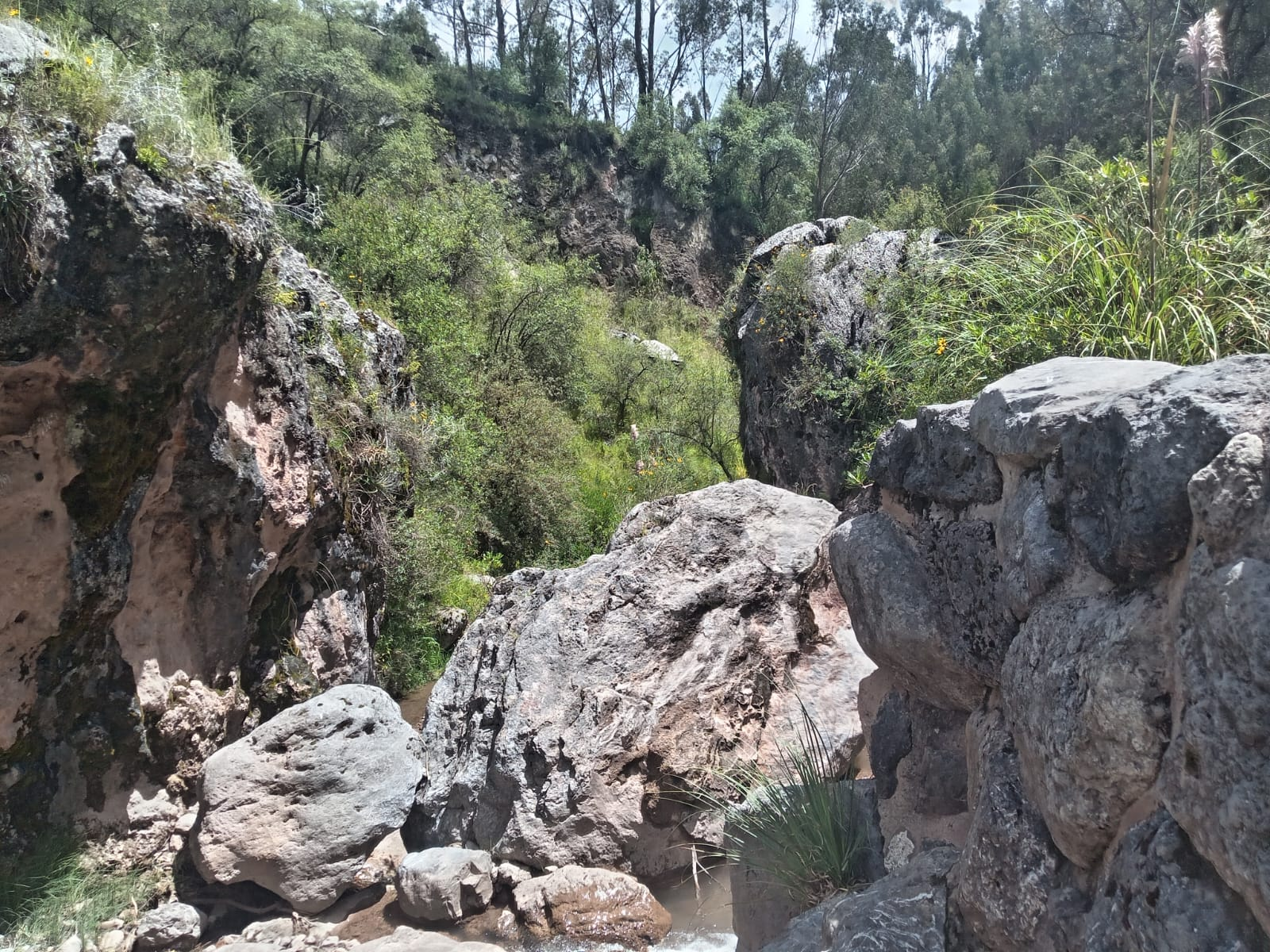

== See also ==
- Inca Empire
- Qoricancha
- Cusco
- Peru
