= Choquequirao Puquio =

Archaeological site in Peru

- Location within Peru
- 13°30′42.99″S 71°57′1.93″W
- Type: Settlement
- Cultures: Inca
- Location: Peru; Cusco Province, Cusco

Choquequirao Puquio (possibly from Quechua chuqi metal, every kind of precious metal / gold (<Aymara), k'iraw crip, cot, pukyu spring, well) is an archaeological site in Peru. It is situated in the Cusco Region, Cusco Province, San Sebastián District, north of San Sebastián.

== See also ==
- Inkilltambo
