= Diego Virrueta =

Peruvian footballer (born 1992)

Personal information
- Full name: Diego Eduardo Virrueta Candia
- Date of birth: 7 March 1992 (age 34)
- Place of birth: Wanchaq
- Position: Forward

Team information
- Current team: Cienciano
- Number: 15

Youth career
- –2009: Cienciano

Senior career*
Years	Team	Apps	(Gls)
2009–	Cienciano	61	(6)
- * Club domestic league appearances and goals as of 22 November 2015

Diego Eduardo Virrueta Candia (born 7 March 1992), known simply as Diego Virrueta, is a Peruvian footballer who plays as a winger or striker for Cienciano in Torneo Descentralizado.

== Club career ==
Diego Virrueta was promoted to the Cienciano first team in January 2009. Manager Julio César Uribe gave him his league debut in the Torneo Descentralizado on 22 March 2009 away to Sport Huancayo. He entered the match in the 46th minute for Sergio Júnior but could not help his side avoid the 2–0 defeat. He recorded his first win with Cienciano in his third league match coming off the bench once again in the 3–0 win over Alianza Atlético for Round 11. Virrueta only managed three appearances in his debut season.
