= Puqin Kancha =

Archaeological site in Peru

- Location: Peru, Cusco Region, Cusco Province, Santiago District
- Region: Andes

Puqin Kancha (other spellings Poken Kancha, Poquencancha) is an archaeological site near Cusco in Peru. It is situated in the Cusco Region, Cusco Province, Santiago District. The site consists of a wall on the mountain Puqin (Puquin). Puqin Kancha is protected by the Peruvian state by General Law No. 28296.
