= Cusco province =

Cusco Province
- Province
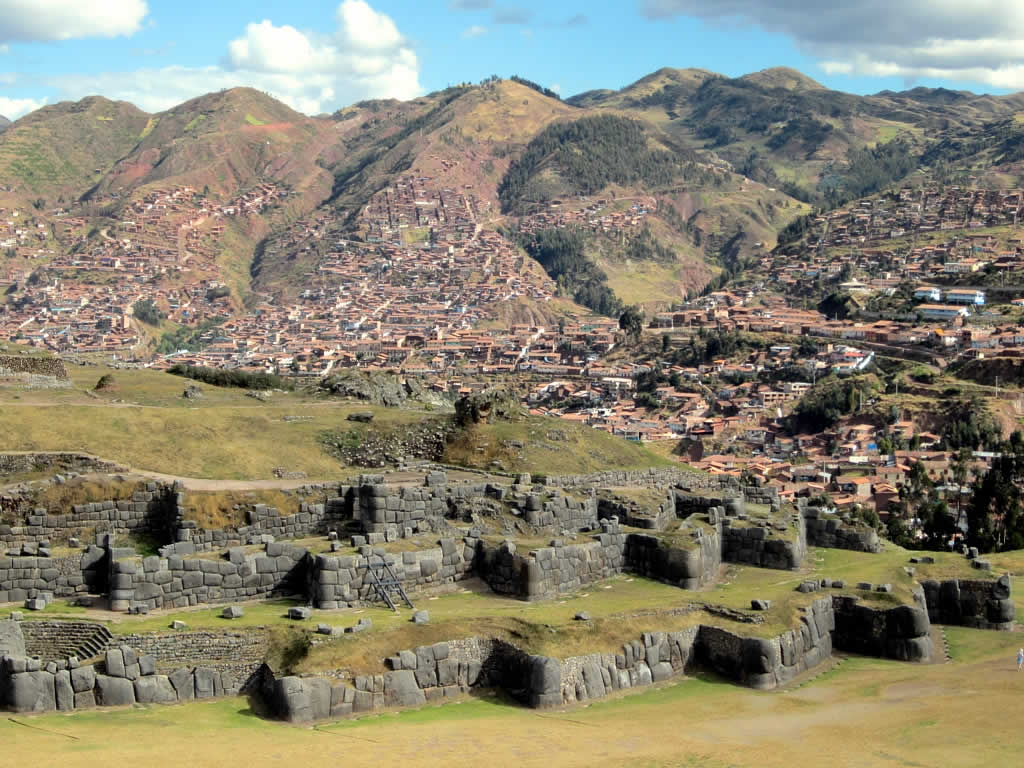
- The archaeological site of Saksaywaman near Cusco

- Flag Coat of arms

- Location of Cusco Province in the Cusco Region

- Location of Cusco Region in Peru
- Coordinates: 13°32′S 71°59′W
- Country: Peru
- Region: Cusco
- Capital: Cusco

Government
  - Mayor: Luis Beltrán Pantoja Calvo (2023–2026)

Area
  - Total: 617.0 km^{2} (238.2 sq mi)

Population
  - Total: 447,588
  - Density: 725.4/km^{2} (1,879/sq mi)
- Demonym(s): Cuzqueño, -ña
- UBIGEO: 0801
- Website: www.municusco.gob.pe

The province of Cusco is located in the southern highlands of Peru and is the smallest of thirteen provinces in the Cusco Region. Its capital is Cusco, which is also the Historical Capital of Peru.

It is bordered to the north by the provinces of Calca and Urubamba, to the east by the province of Quispicanchi, to the south by the province of Paruro, and to the west by the province of Anta. It has a population of 447,588 inhabitants.

== Geography ==
Some of the highest mountains of the province are listed below:

- Anawarkhi
- Anka Wachana
- Aqu Q'asa
- Araway Qhata
- Chaku Urqu
- Harata Muqu
- Hatun Ayaq
- Huch'uy Paquyuq
- Ichhu Urqu
- Linli Churana
- Lluq'iyuq Muqu
- Machu Ayaq
- Mullu Waman
- Muña Urqu
- Muyu Urqu
- Ñustayuq
- Pachatusan
- Pikchu
- Pillku Urqu
- Puka Qaqa
- Puka Q'asa
- Pukamuqu
- Puma Wasin
- Sinqa
- Sirk'a Pata
- Tawqaray
- Tuqtu Wampa
- T'ankar Q'asa
- Uma Chuwalla Urqu
- Waman Wallpa
- Wanakawri
- Wank'a Urqu
- Waypun
- Yana Qaqa
- Yawarquchayuq

== Political division ==
The province is divided into eight districts (Spanish: distritos, singular: distrito), each of which is headed by a mayor (alcalde). The districts, with their capitals in parentheses, are:

- Cusco (Cusco) (seat)
- Ccorca (Ccorca)
- Poroy (Poroy)
- San Jerónimo (San Jerónimo)
- San Sebastián (San Sebastián)
- Santiago (Santiago)
- Saylla (Saylla)
- Wanchaq (Wanchaq)

Population by district
City district	Area km^{2}	Population 2007 census(hab)	Housing (2007)	Density (inhabitants/km^{2})	Elevation msl
Cuzco	116.22 km^{2}	108,798*	28,476	936.1	3,399 msl
San Jerónimo	103.34 km^{2}	28,856*	8,942	279.2	3,244 msl
San Sebastián	89.44 km^{2}	85,472*	18,109	955.6	3,244 msl
Santiago	69.72 km^{2}	66,277*	21,168	950.6	3,400 msl
Wanchaq	6.38 km^{2}	54,524*	14,690	8,546.1	3,366 msl
Total	385.1 km^{2}	358,052*	91,385	929.76	—
*Census data conducted by INEI

== Government ==
Cusco Province is administered by the Provincial Municipality of Cusco (Municipalidad Provincial del Cusco), which also administers the city of Cusco. Its current mayor is Luis Pantoja Calvo (2023–2026).

== Ethnic groups ==
The province is inhabited by indigenous citizens of Quechua descent. Spanish is the language which the majority of the population (80.87%) learnt to speak in childhood, 18.22% of the residents started speaking using the Quechua language (2007 Peru Census).

== Archaeological sites ==
Some of the most important archaeological sites of the province are as follows:

- Amaru Marka Wasi
- Chuqik'iraw Pukyu
- Ch'iqullu
- Inkill Tampu
- Pumamarka
- Puqin Kancha
- Qullqanpata
- Qullqapampa
- Rumiwasi
- Saksaywaman
- Waqutu
- Wayna Tawqaray

== See also ==
- Santurantikuy
