= Ccorca District =

Coordinates: 13.5839°S 72.0591°W

Ccorca
- District
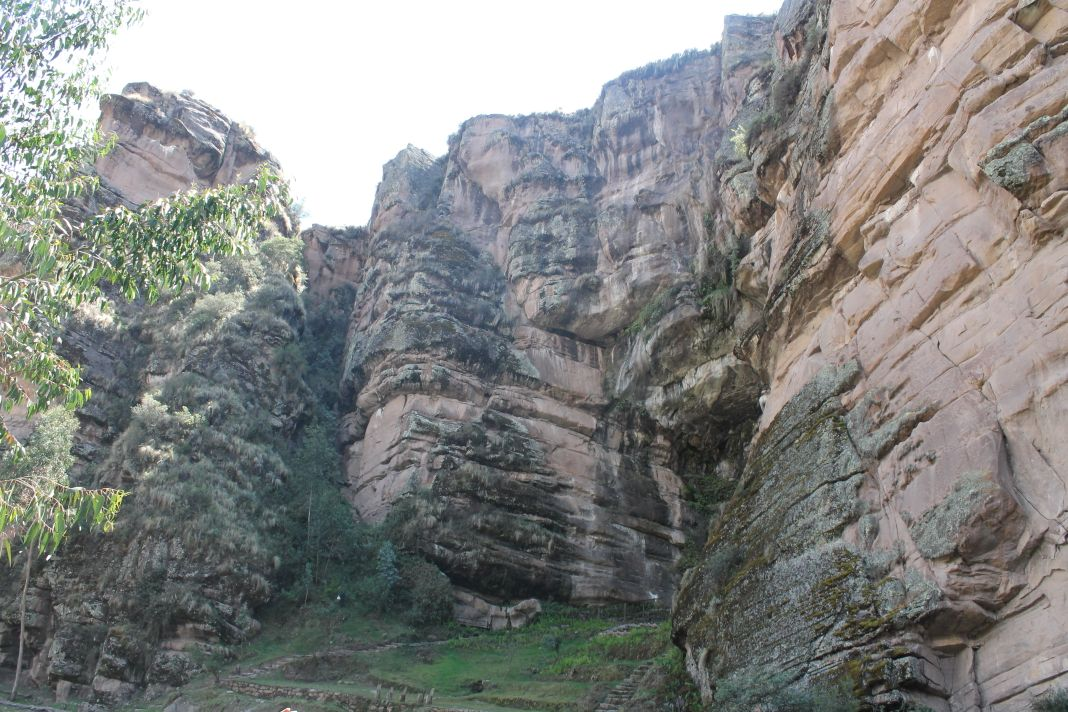
- Catarata de Tecsecocha
- Interactive map of Ccorca
- Country: Peru
- Region: Cusco
- Province: Cusco
- Founded: January 14, 1942
- Capital: Ccorca

Government
  - Mayor: Edgar Ulises Meza Garcia

Area
  - Total: 188.56 km^{2} (72.80 sq mi)
- Elevation: 3,635 m (11,926 ft)

Population (2005 census)
  - Total: 2,441
  - Density: 12.95/km^{2} (33.53/sq mi)
- Time zone: UTC-5 (PET)
- UBIGEO: 080102

Ccorca District is one of eight districts of the Cusco Province in Peru.

== Geography ==
One of the highest peaks of the district is Mullu Waman at 4,200 m (13,800 ft). Other mountains are listed below:

- Amaruyuq
- Aqu Q'asa
- Arata Muqu
- Chaku Urqu
- Chuqru Q'asa
- Hatun
- Hatun Ayaq
- Lunkasniyuq
- Lusa Lusayuq
- Machu Ayaq
- Puka Q'asa
- Puma Wasin
- Waman Wallpa
- Yawar Quchayuq
