= Poroy District =

Coordinates: 13.5052°S 72.0267°W

Poroy
- District
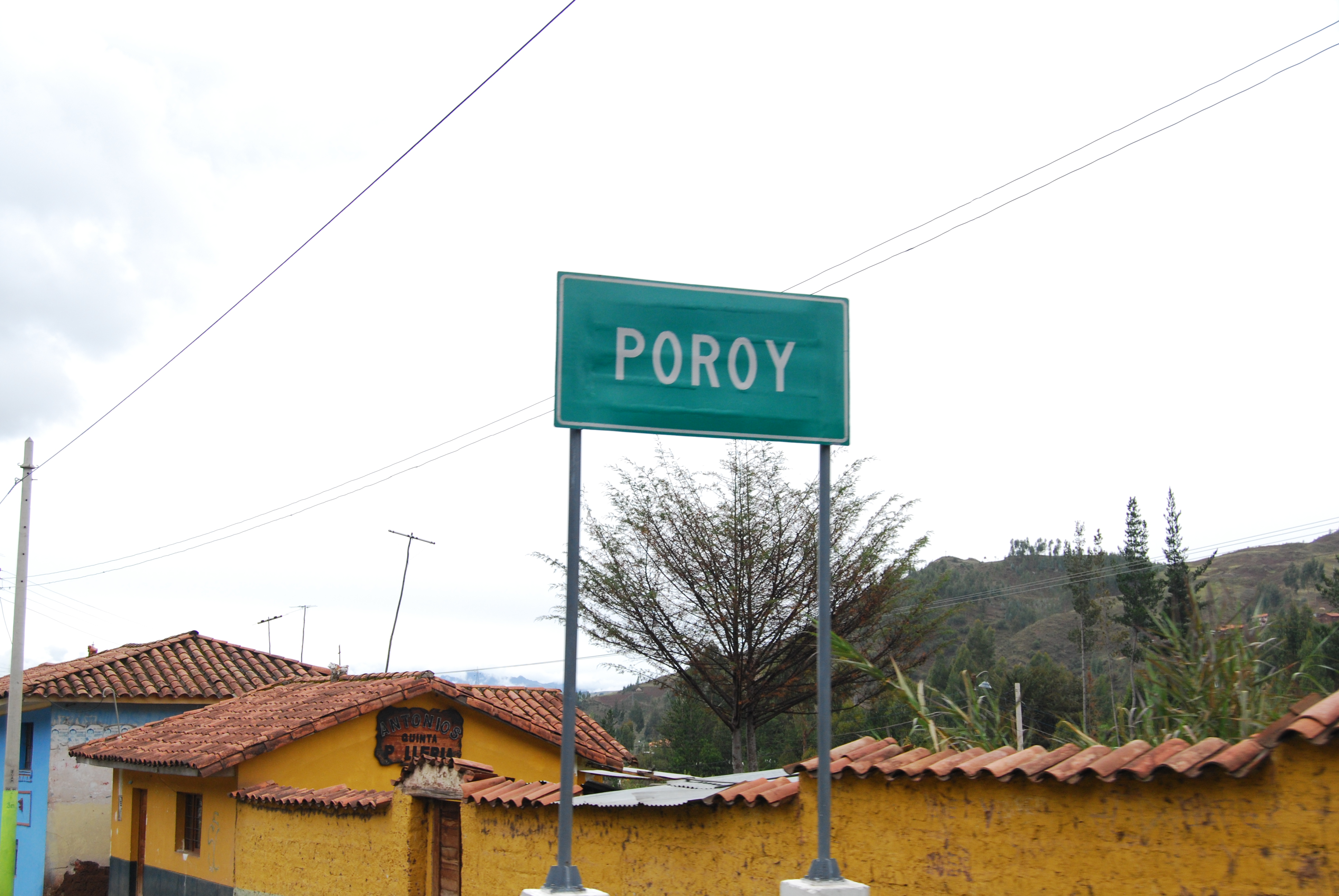
- Interactive map of Poroy
- Country: Peru
- Region: Cusco
- Province: Cusco
- Founded: February 20, 1941
- Capital: Poroy

Government
  - Mayor: Miguel Angel Sanchez Arteaga

Area
  - Total: 14.96 km^{2} (5.78 sq mi)
- Elevation: 3,570 m (11,710 ft)

Population (2005 census)
  - Total: 4,452
  - Density: 297.6/km^{2} (770.8/sq mi)
- Time zone: UTC-5 (PET)
- UBIGEO: 080103

Poroy District is one of eight districts of the province Cusco in Peru.
