= Pikchu =

Mountain in Peru

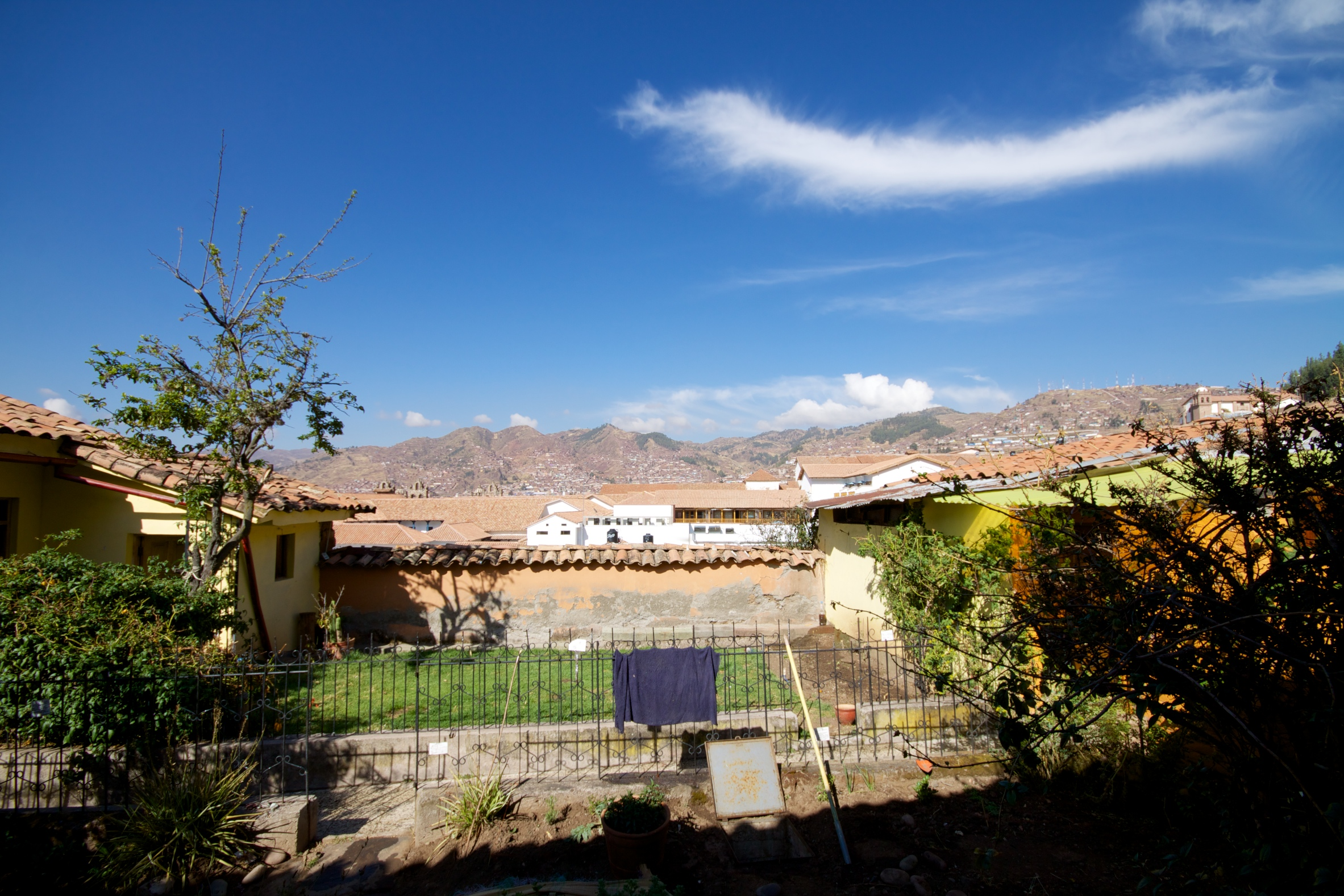
- Antennas on top of Pikchu (on the right)

Highest point
- Elevation: 3,800 m (12,500 ft)
- Coordinates: 13°30′50″S 71°59′45″W

Naming
- Language of name: Quechua

Geography
- Location within Peru
- Location: Peru, Cusco Region
- Parent range: Andes

Pikchu (Quechua for pyramid/mountain or prominence with a broad base which ends in sharp peaks, Hispanicized spelling Picchu) is a mountain in the Andes of Peru west of the city of Cusco, about 3,800 metres (12,467 ft) high. It is located in the Cusco Region, Cusco Province, Cusco District.

Presently there are numerous microwave antennas on top of the mountain.

== See also ==
- Anawarkhi
- Araway Qhata
- Muyu Urqu
- Pachatusan
- Pillku Urqu
- Sinqa
- Wanakawri
