= Saylla District =

Coordinates: 13.5649°S 71.8386°W

Saylla
- District
- Interactive map of Saylla
- Country: Peru
- Region: Cusco
- Province: Cusco
- Founded: January 14, 1942
- Capital: Saylla

Government
  - Mayor: Rolando Ccopa Mendoza

Area
  - Total: 28.38 km^{2} (10.96 sq mi)
- Elevation: 3,138 m (10,295 ft)

Population (2005 census)
  - Total: 2,635
  - Density: 92.85/km^{2} (240.5/sq mi)
- Time zone: UTC-5 (PET)
- UBIGEO: 080107

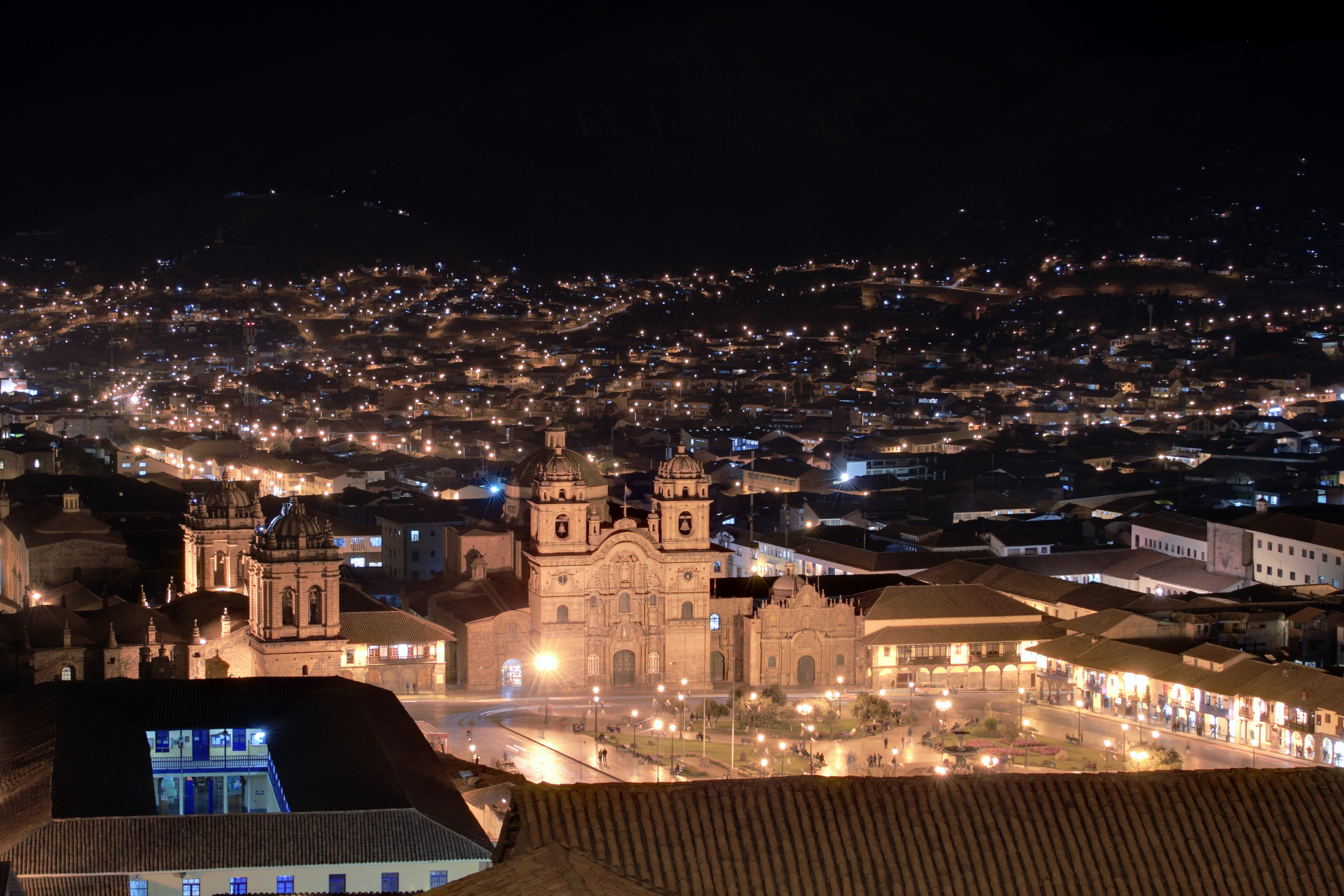
Night view of Cusco's Plaza de Armas

Saylla District is one of eight districts of the province Cusco in Peru.

== See also ==
- Pachatusan
- Waqutu
- Waypun
