= San Jerónimo District, Cusco =

Coordinates: 13.5521°S 71.8813°W

San Jerónimo District
- District
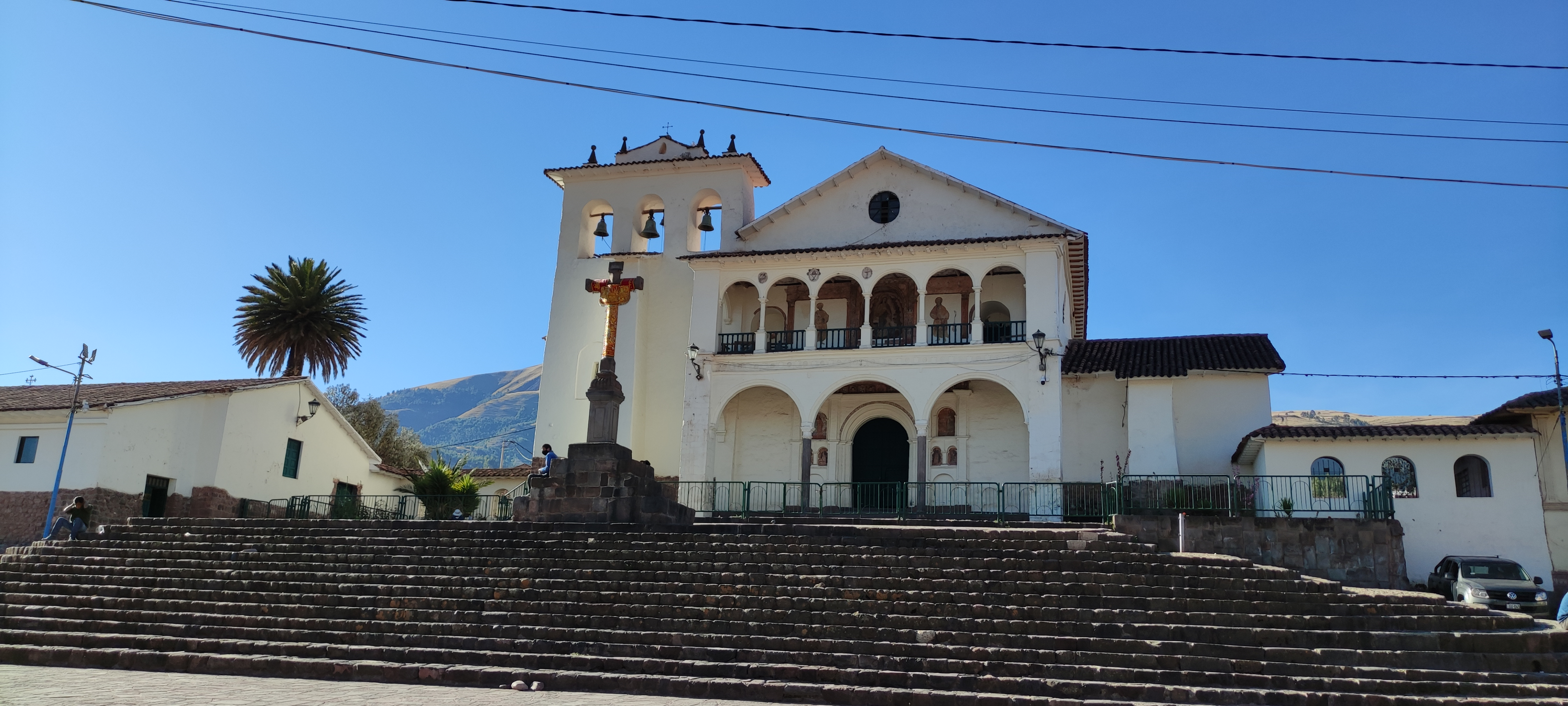
- San Jerónimo Church

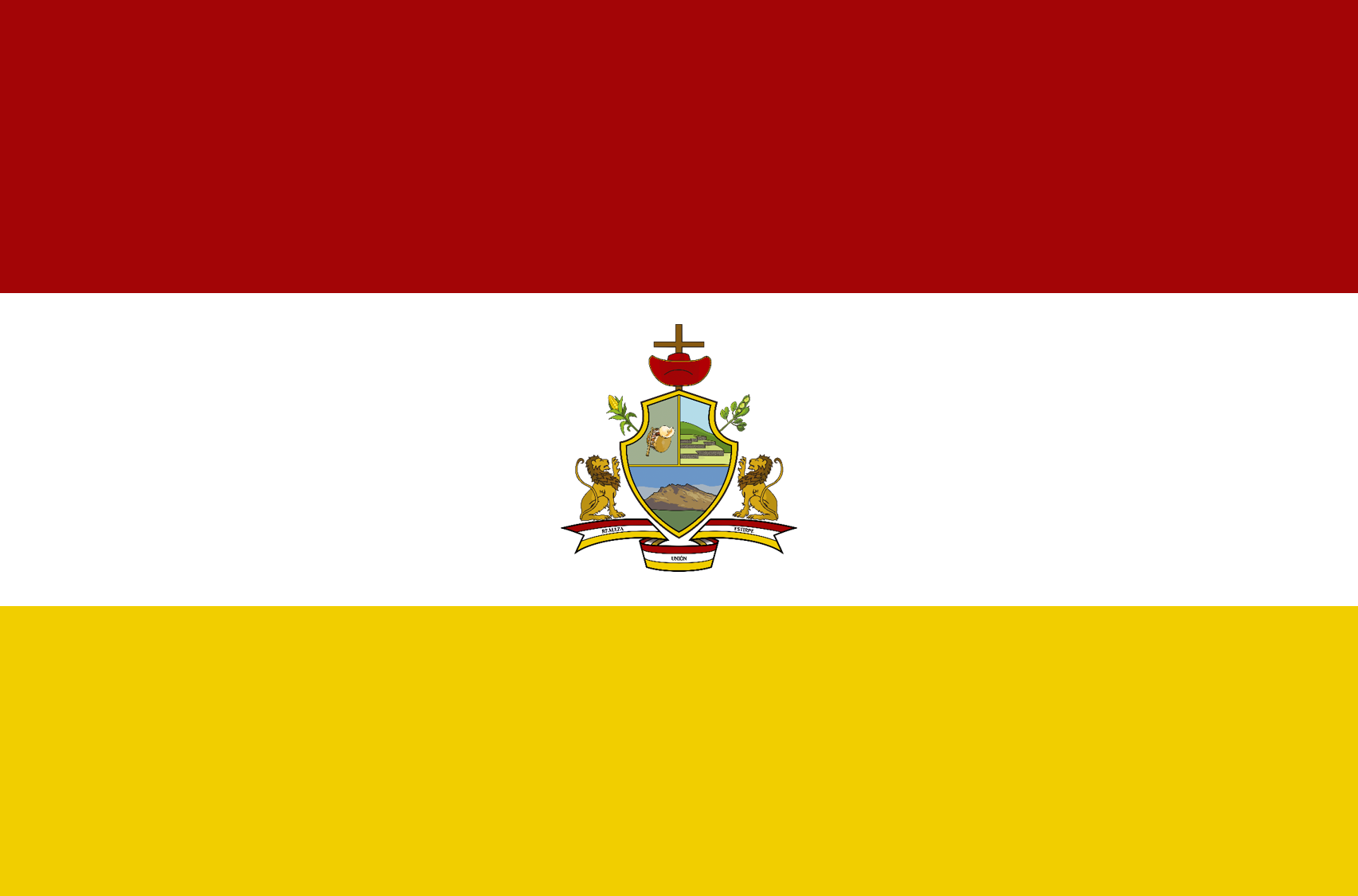
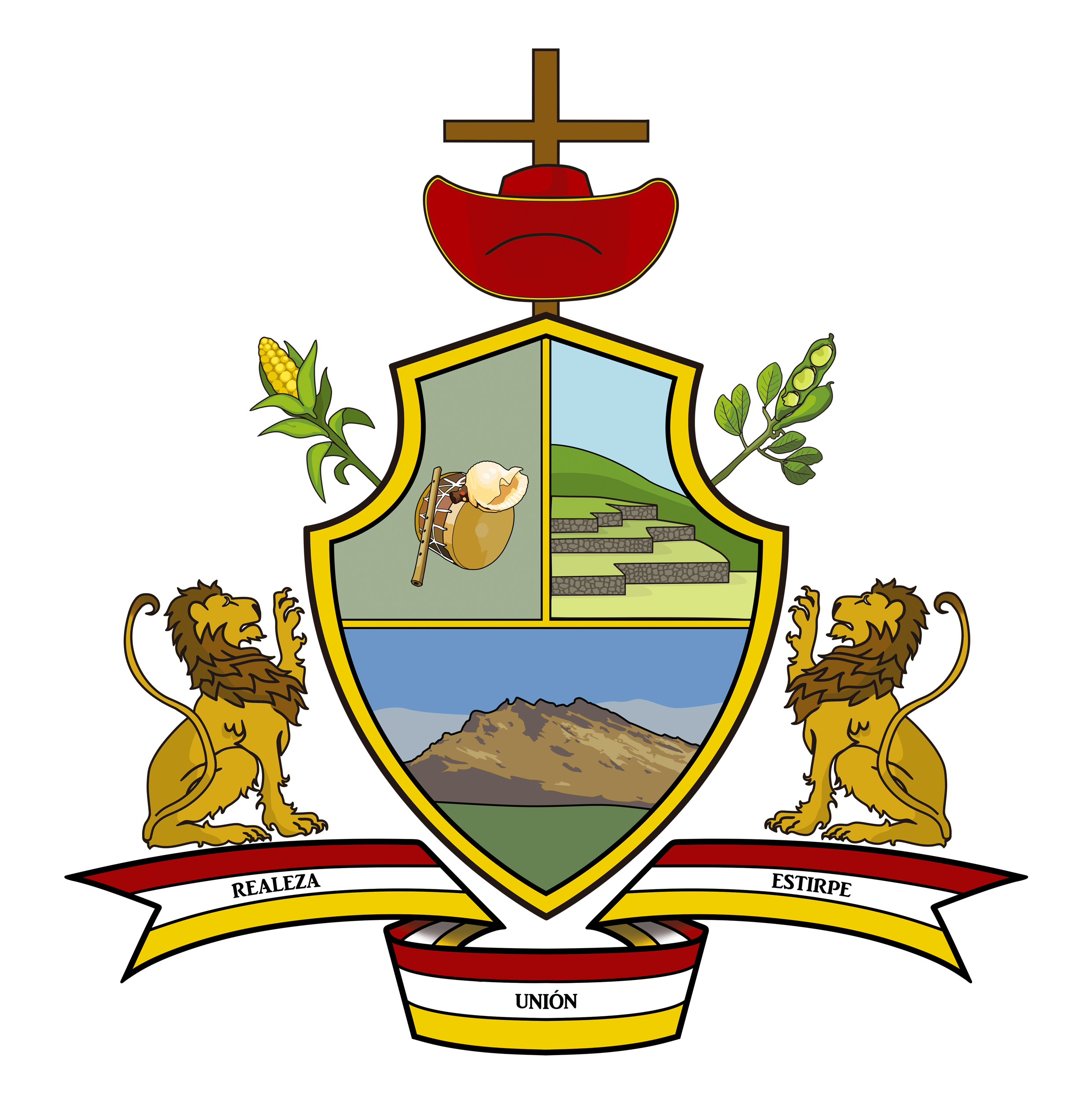
- Flag Coat of arms
- Interactive map of San Jerónimo District
- Country: Peru
- Region: Cusco
- Province: Cusco
- Capital: San Jerónimo

Government
  - Mayor: Justino Adolfo Zuniga Paro

Area
  - Total: 103.34 km^{2} (39.90 sq mi)
- Elevation: 3,244 m (10,643 ft)

Population (2017 census)
  - Total: 57,075
  - Density: 552.30/km^{2} (1,430.5/sq mi)
- Time zone: UTC-5 (PET)
- UBIGEO: 080104

San Jerónimo District is one of eight districts of the Cusco Province in Peru. It is home to the Universidad Andina del Cusco. According to the 2007 census, there are 31,687 residents in the district. A large part of the population communicates in Quechua. On August 9, 1970, LANSA Flight 502 crashed over the district. All but one of the 99 people on board were killed, with another 2 people on the ground.

== Geography ==
One of the highest peaks of the district is Pillku Urqu at 4,448 m (14,593 ft). Other mountains are listed below:

- Huch'uy Paquyuq
- Inti Churana
- Lluq'iyuq Muqu
- Puka Q'asa
- Tuqtu Wampa
- Wanakawri
- Yana Qaqa

== See also ==
- Ch'iqullu
- Pachatusan
- Waqutu
