= San Sebastián District, Cusco =

Coordinates: 13.5362°S 71.9261°W

San Sebastián District
- District
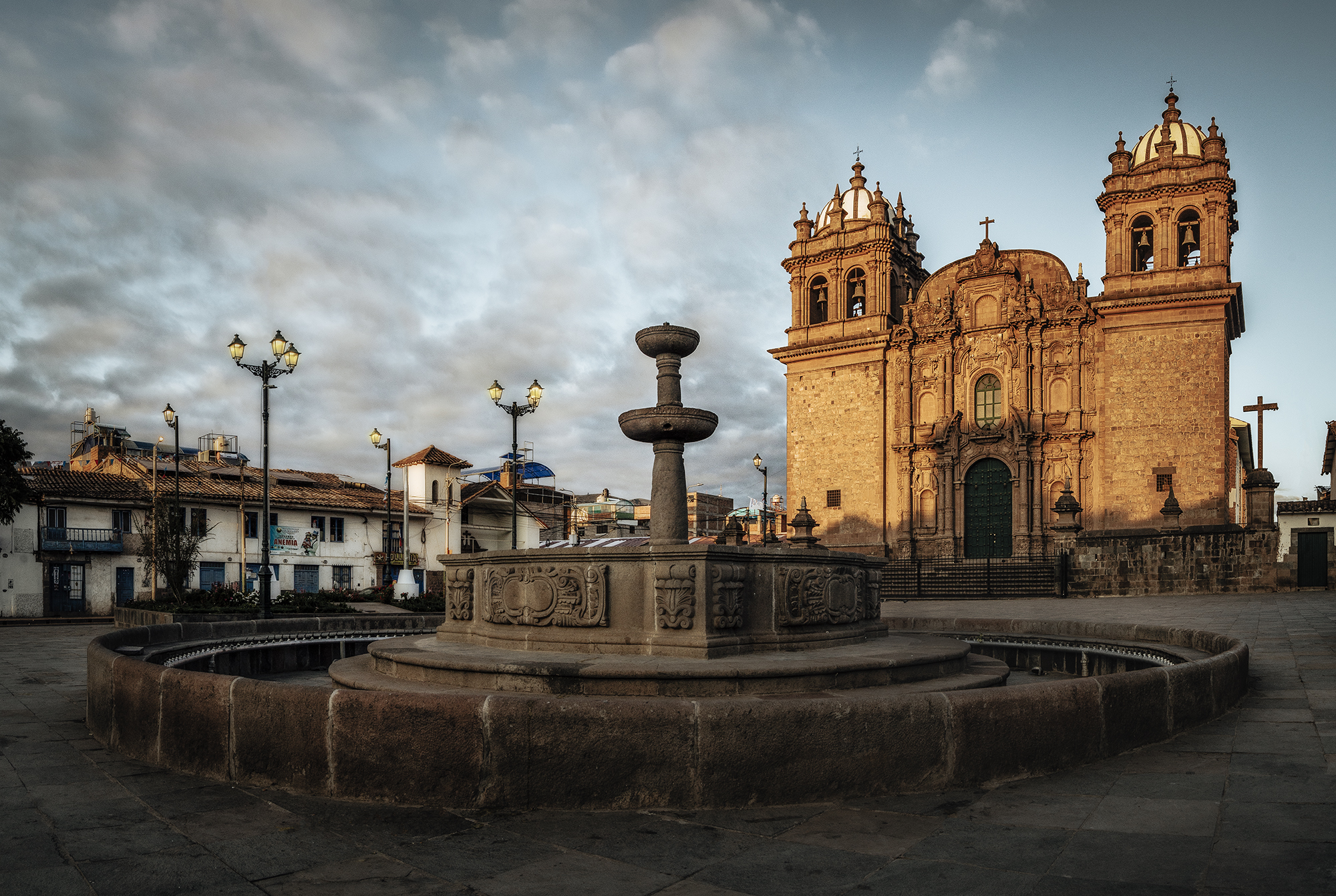
- San Sebastián Main Square
- Interactive map of San Sebastián District
- Country: Peru
- Region: Cusco
- Province: Cusco
- Capital: San Sebastián

Government
  - Mayor: Jorge Isaacs Acurio Tito

Area
  - Total: 89.44 km^{2} (34.53 sq mi)
- Elevation: 3,244 m (10,643 ft)

Population (2025 census)
  - Total: 134,219
  - Density: 1,501/km^{2} (3,887/sq mi)
- Time zone: UTC-5 (PET)
- UBIGEO: 080105
- Website: munisansebastian.gob.pe

San Sebastián District is one of eight districts of the Cusco Province in Peru.

== Geography ==
One of the highest peaks of the district is Anawarkhi at 4,050 m (13,290 ft). Other mountains are listed below:

- Anka Wachana
- Ñustayuq
- Tawqaray
- Wanakawri

== Archaeology ==
Some of the most important archaeological sites of the district are Chuqik'iraw Pukyu, Inkill Tampu, Pumamarka, Puqin Kancha, Qullqapampa, Rumiwasi and Wayna Tawqaray.
