= Pumamarka, San Sebastián =

Archaeological site in Peru

Pumamarka
- Location: Peru, Cusco Region, Cusco Province
- Region: Andes

Pumamarka (Aymara and Quechua puma cougar, puma, marka village, "puma village", is an archaeological park in Peru. It is located in the Cusco Region, Cusco Province, San Sebastián District, on the left side of the river Pumamarka. The site was declared a National Cultural Heritage (Patrimonio Cultural) of Peru by the National Institute of Culture.

== See also ==
- Inkill Tampu
- Ollantaytambo
- Rumiwasi
