= Wanakawri (Cusco) =

Archaeological site in Peru

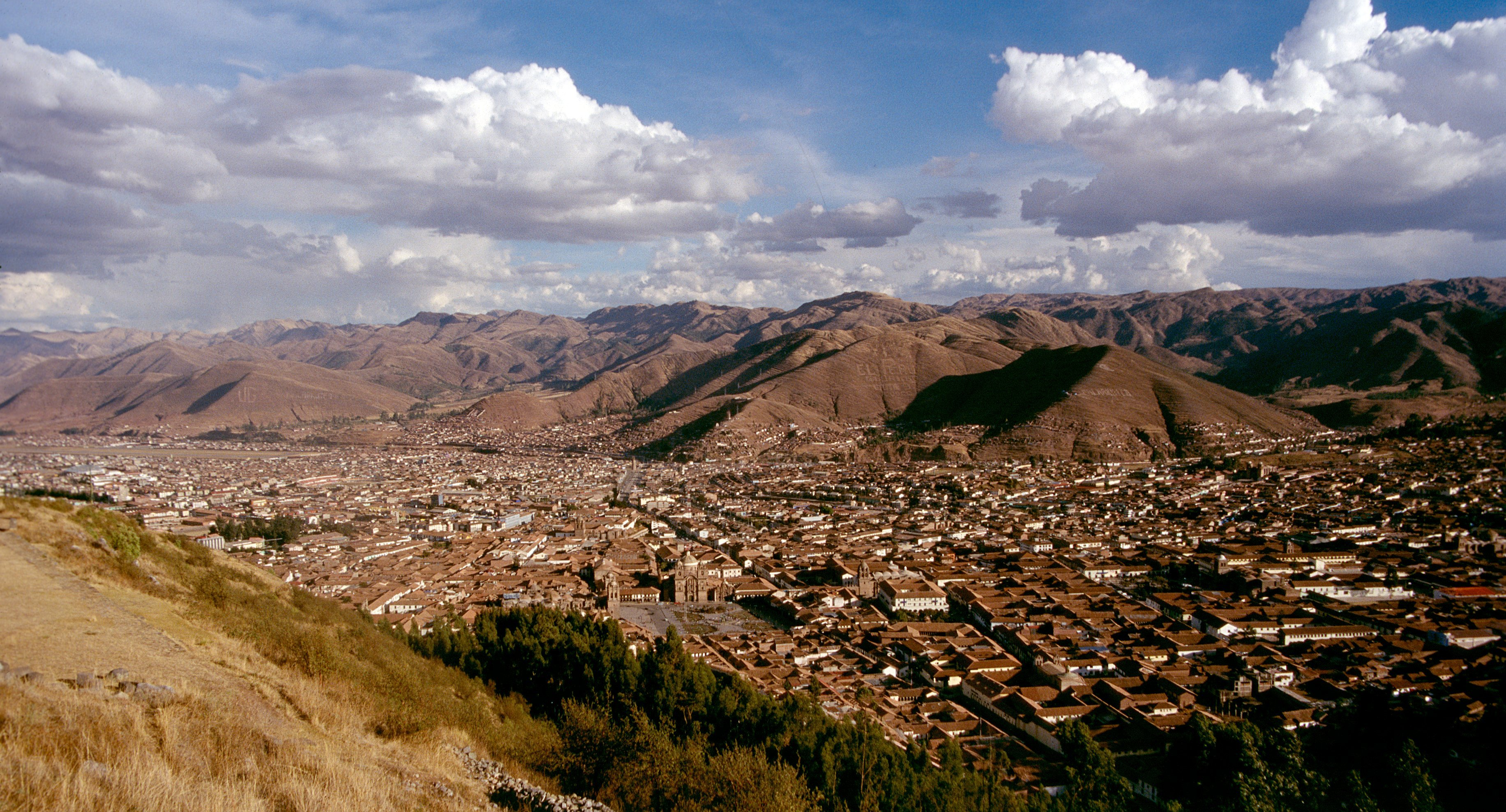
- A view of Cusco and the mountains southeast of it

Highest point
- Elevation: 4,089 m (13,415 ft)
- Coordinates: 13°35′40″S 71°54′20″W

Naming
- Language of name: Quechua

Geography
- Location within Peru
- Location: Cusco Province, Cusco Region, Peru
- Parent range: Andes

Wanakawri (Quechua, also spelled Guanacaure, Guanacauri, Huanacaure, Huanacauri, Wanacaure, Wanacauri, Wanakaure, Wanakauri) is an archaeological site and a legendary mountain in Peru. It is situated in the Cusco Region, Cusco Province, in the districts San Jerónimo and San Sebastián, and in the Paruro Province, Yaurisque District. The mountain with the archaeological remains is 4,089 metres (13,415 ft) high and one of the highest elevations near Cusco.

Wanakawri was one of the most important wak'as of the Inca culture.

== Gallery ==
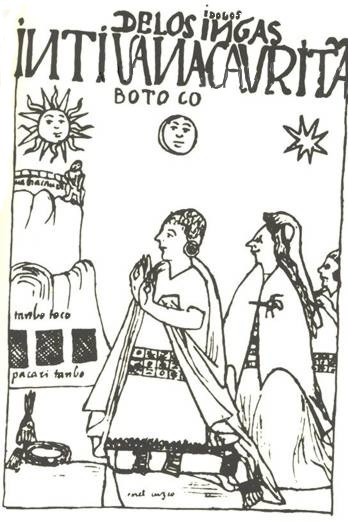
Guaman Poma 1615: "IDOLOS DE LOS INGAS INTI, UANACAURI, TAMBOTOCO" (Idolos de los Incas Inti, Wanakawri, Tampu T'uqu)

== See also ==
- Anawarkhi
- Araway Qhata
- Muyu Urqu
- Pachatusan
- Pikchu
- Pillku Urqu
- Sinqa
- Wayna Tawqaray
