= Ferrocarril Trasandino S.A. =

Peruvian corporation

- Formation: 1999; 27 years ago
- Type: Sociedad Anónima
- Headquarters: Arequipa, Peru
- Staff: 680
- Website: http://www.ferrocarriltransandino.com/

Ferrocarril Trasandino S.A. is a company incorporated in Peru. It is the current concessionaire of the Southern Railway track, which adds up to a total of 980 kilometers of track divided into the Southern and Southeastern sections. It is owned, like the operator PeruRail, by the Sousa family and the Central Foundation.

== Historia ==
On July 19, 1999, the Peruvian State granted a concession to Ferrocarril Trasandino the railroad track of the Southern Railway, which was responsible for managing the railway infrastructure. The operation of the railways would be carried out by the company PeruRail. Under this contract, it is responsible for the maintenance of rolling stock, railways, stations and bridges, signalling and telecommunications systems. Based on this, Ferrocarril Trasandino began operations in September 1999.
