= Pillku Urqu =

Mountain in Peru

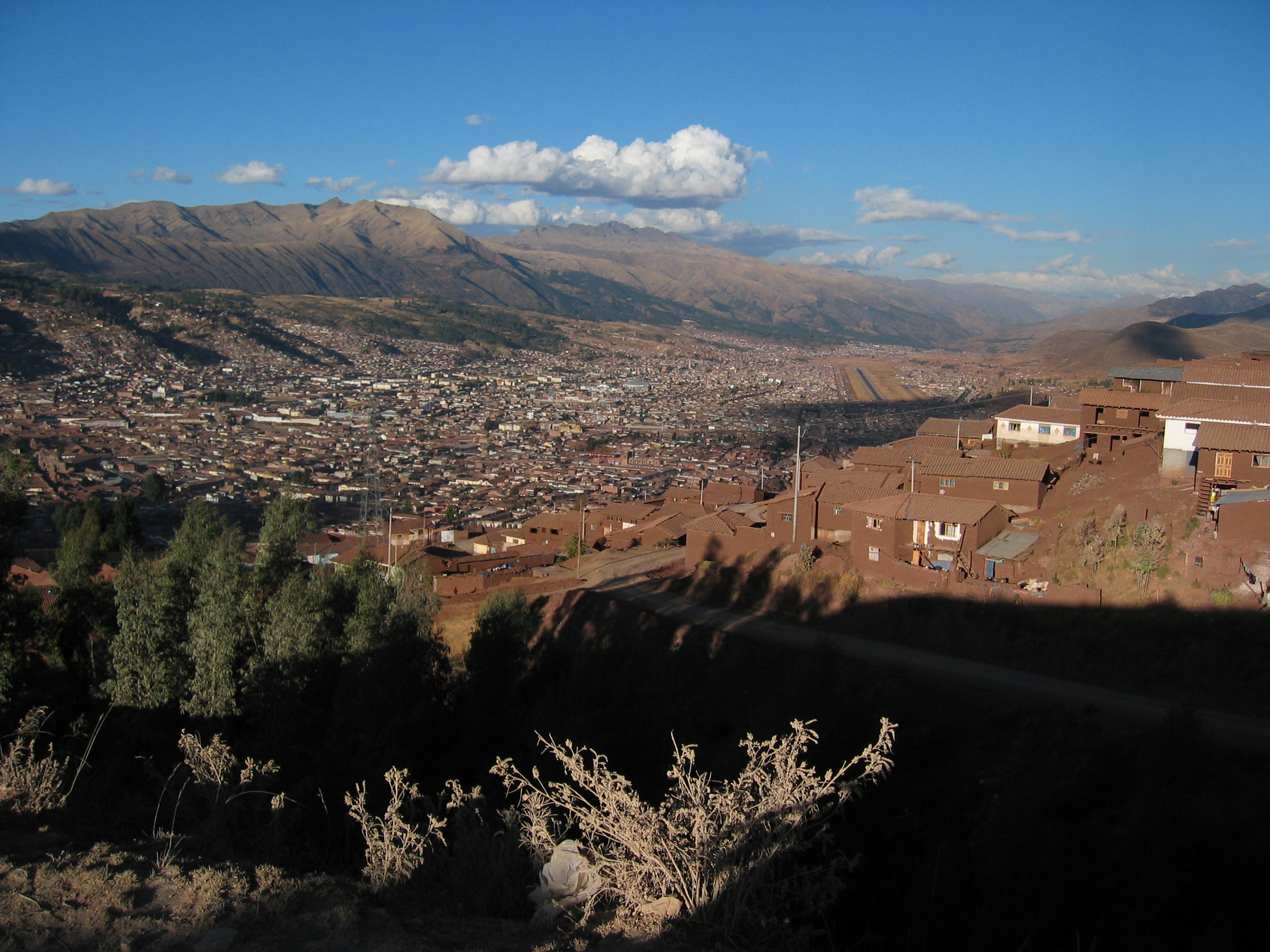
- Cusco with the mountains Pillku Urqu (on the left) and Pachatusan (center) in the background

Highest point
- Elevation: 4,448 m (14,593 ft)
- Coordinates: 13°29′50″S 71°52′50″W

Naming
- Language of name: Quechua

Geography
- Location within Peru
- Location: Peru, Cusco Region
- Parent range: Andes

Pillku Urqu (Quechua pillku red, urqu mountain), also known as Pikul, Piqul (possibly a corruption of pillku, Hispanicized spellings Piccol, Picol, also Pikol, Piqol) or Wayna Piqul (Quechua wayna young, Hispanicized Huaynapicol, Huaynapiccol, also Wayna Piqol), is a 4,448-metre-high (14,593 ft) mountain in the Andes of Peru, near the city of Cusco. It is situated in the Cusco Region, Calca Province, Taray District, and in the Cusco Province, San Jerónimo District, north of San Jerónimo.

By the local people Pillku Urqu has been venerated as an apu.

== See also ==
- Anawarkhi
- Araway Qhata
- Mawk'ataray
- Pachatusan
- Pikchu
- Sinqa
- Wanakawri
