= Sinqa =

Mountain in Peru

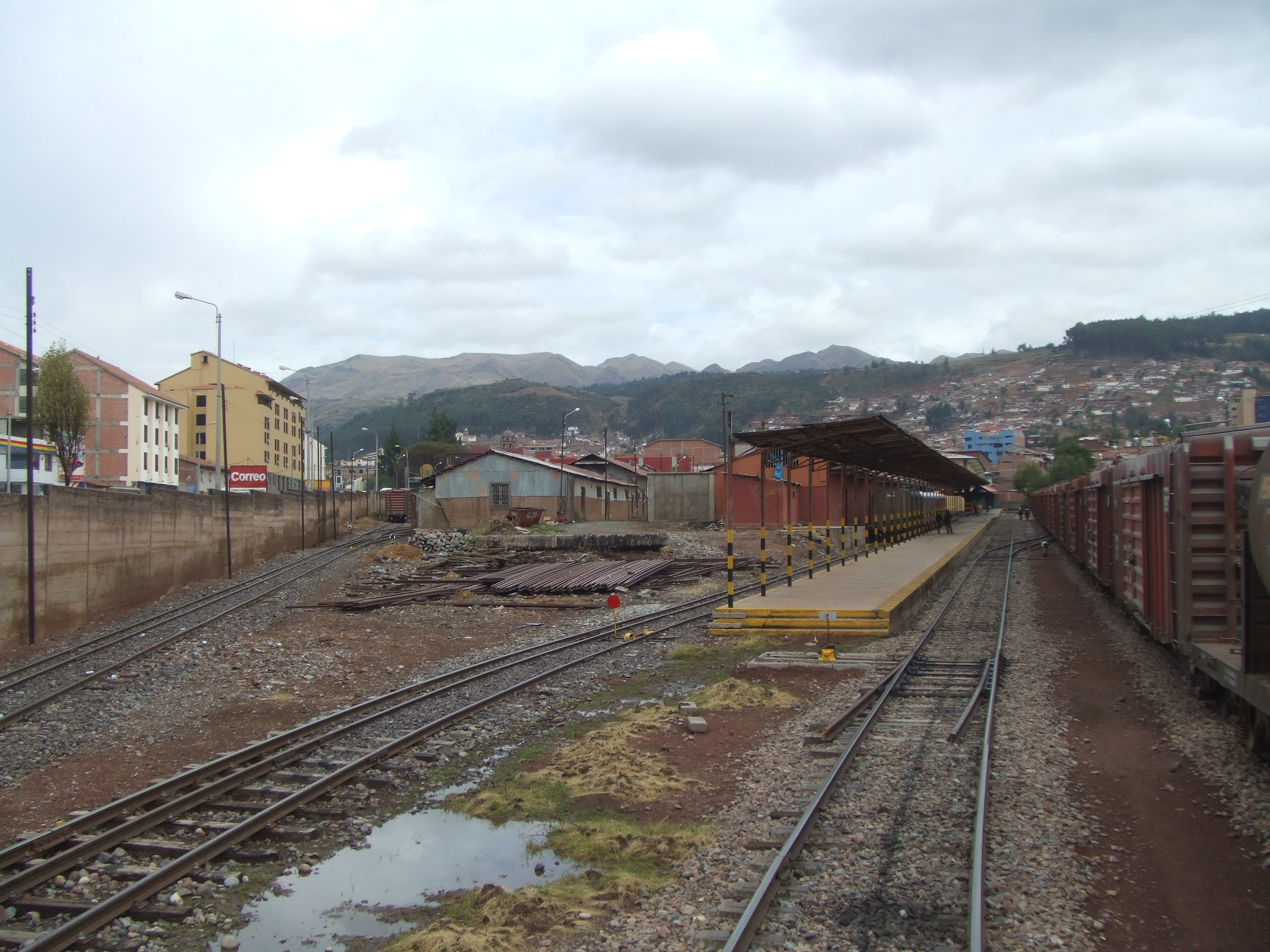
- Sinqa (on the left) as seen from San Pedro station

Highest point
- Elevation: 4,423 m (14,511 ft)
- Coordinates: 13°27′26″S 72°00′20″W

Naming
- Language of name: Quechua

Geography
- Location within Peru
- Location: Peru, Cusco Region
- Parent range: Andes

Sinqa (Quechua for "nose", Hispanicized spelling Sencca, also Senqa) is a 4,423-metre-high (14,511 ft) mountain in the Andes of Peru northwest of the city of Cusco. It lies in the Cusco Region, Cusco Province, Cusco District, and in the Anta Province, Cachimayo District.

Like Pachatusan, Pillku Urqu and Wanakawri, Sinqa is one of the mountains in the vicinity of Cusco which have been venerated as apus (sacred mountains).

== Gallery ==
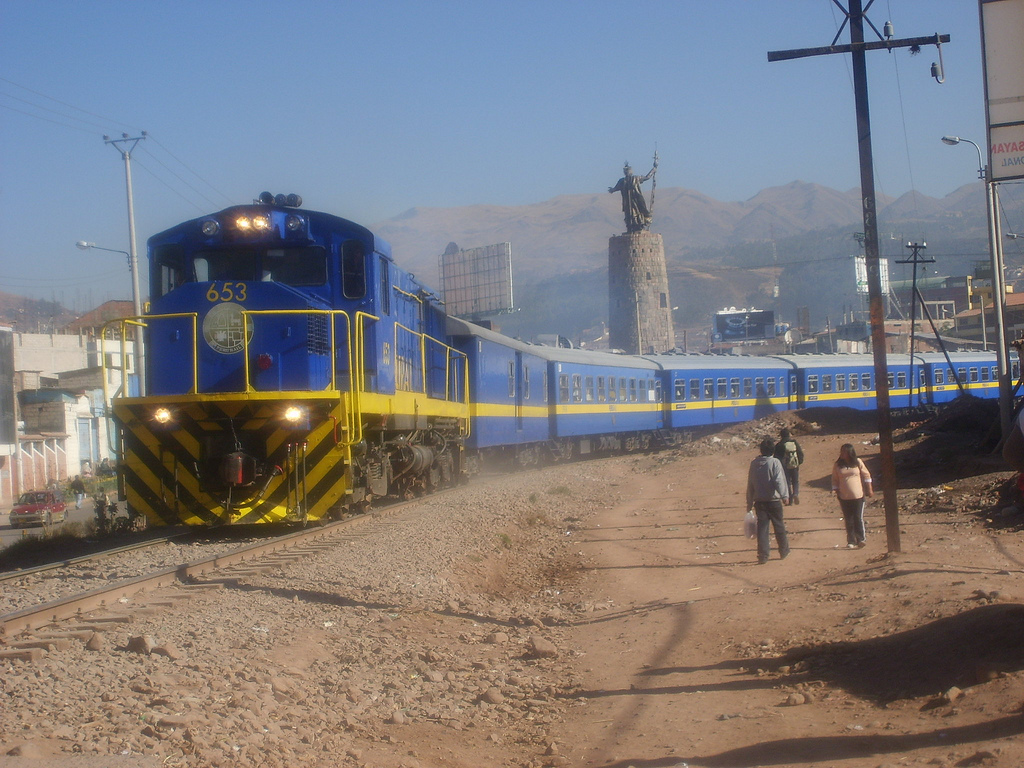
Sinqa as seen from a station in Cusco

== See also ==
- Anawarkhi
- Araway Qhata
- Muyu Urqu
- Pikchu
