= Araway Qhata =

Mountain in Peru

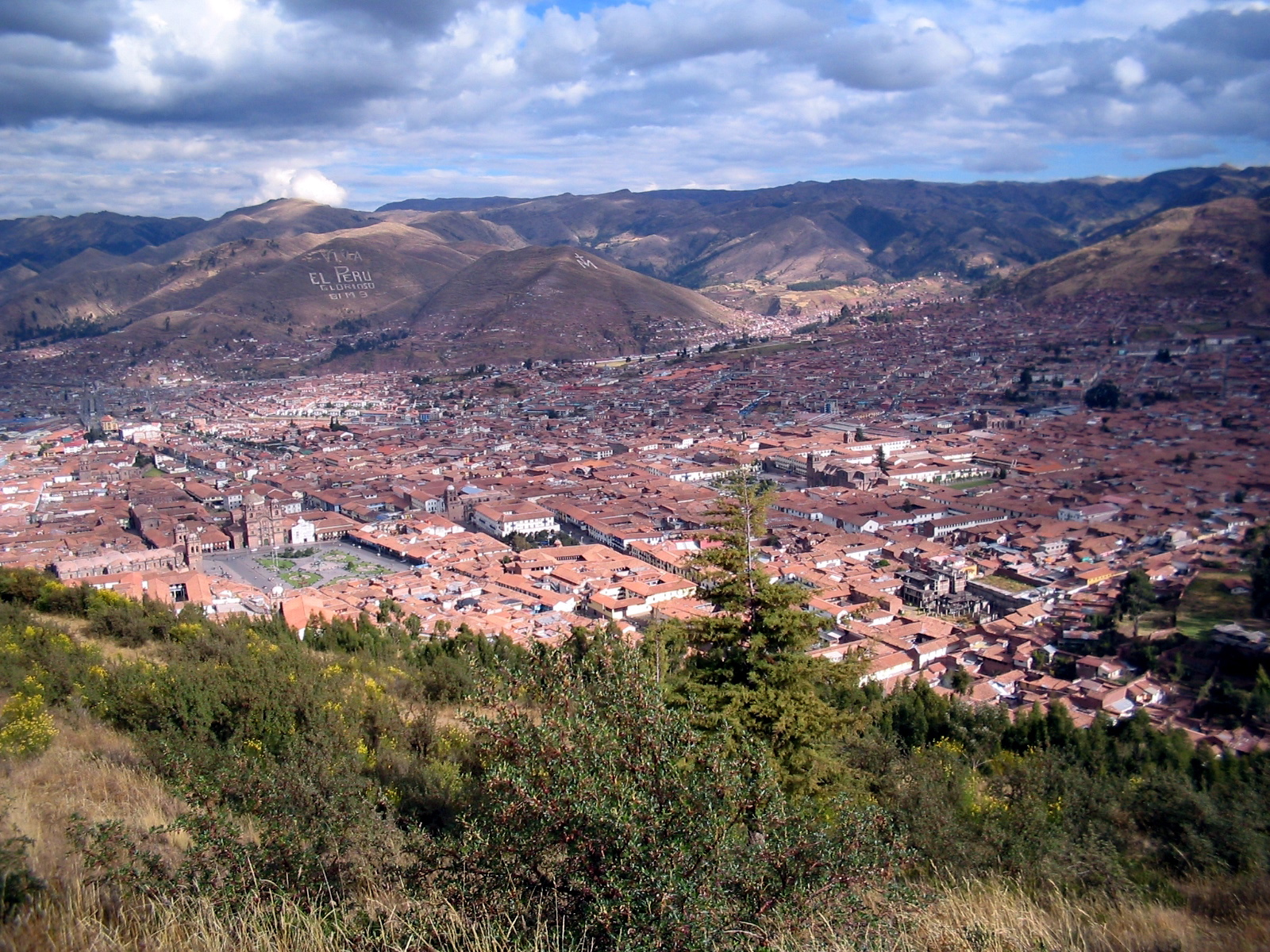
- Araway Qhata (on the left) with the inscription Viva El Perú Glorioso

Highest point
- Elevation: 3,066 m (10,059 ft)
- Coordinates: 13°32′35″S 71°58′10″W

Naming
- Language of name: Quechua

Geography
- Location within Peru
- Location: Peru, Cusco Region, Cusco Province
- Parent range: Andes

Araway Qhata (Quechua, araway to hang, to hang oneself, to kill someone by hanging, qhata slope, hillside) which further to the south is named Kunturuma (Quechua kuntur condor, uma head, "condor head", Hispanicized spelling Condoroma) is a mountain in the south of the city of Cusco in Peru. It lies in the Cusco Region, Cusco Province, Santiago District. The words Viva El Perú Glorioso (Spanish for "long live glorious Peru") have been carved into the mountain side in large letters so that they can be read from the city below.

== See also ==
- Anawarkhi
- Muyu Urqu
- Pachatusan
- Pikchu
- Pillku Urqu
- Sinqa
- Wanakawri
