= Santiago District, Cusco =

Coordinates: 13.5415°S 71.9840°W

Santiago District Distrito de Santiago
- District
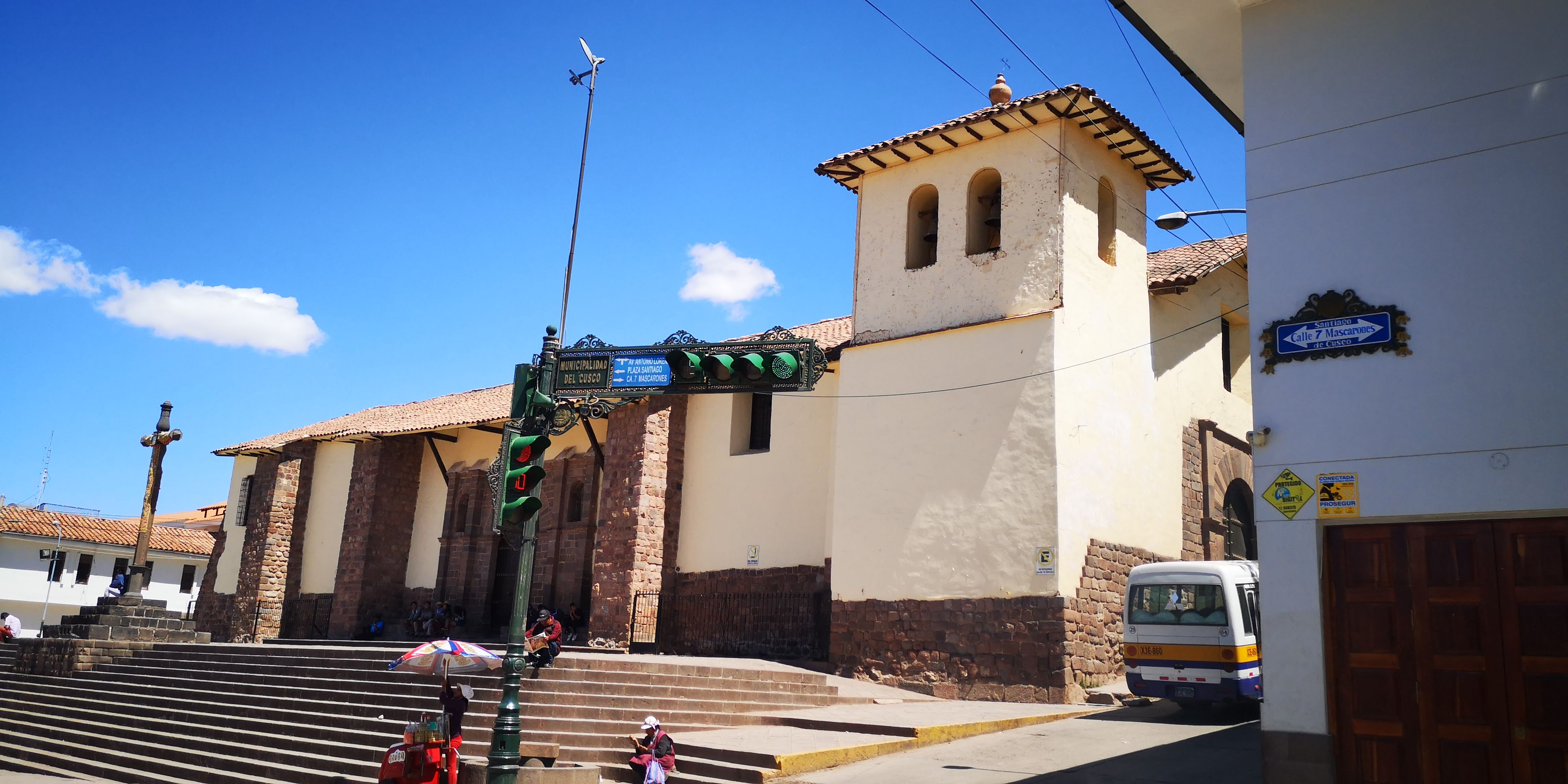
- Santiago Apóstol Church

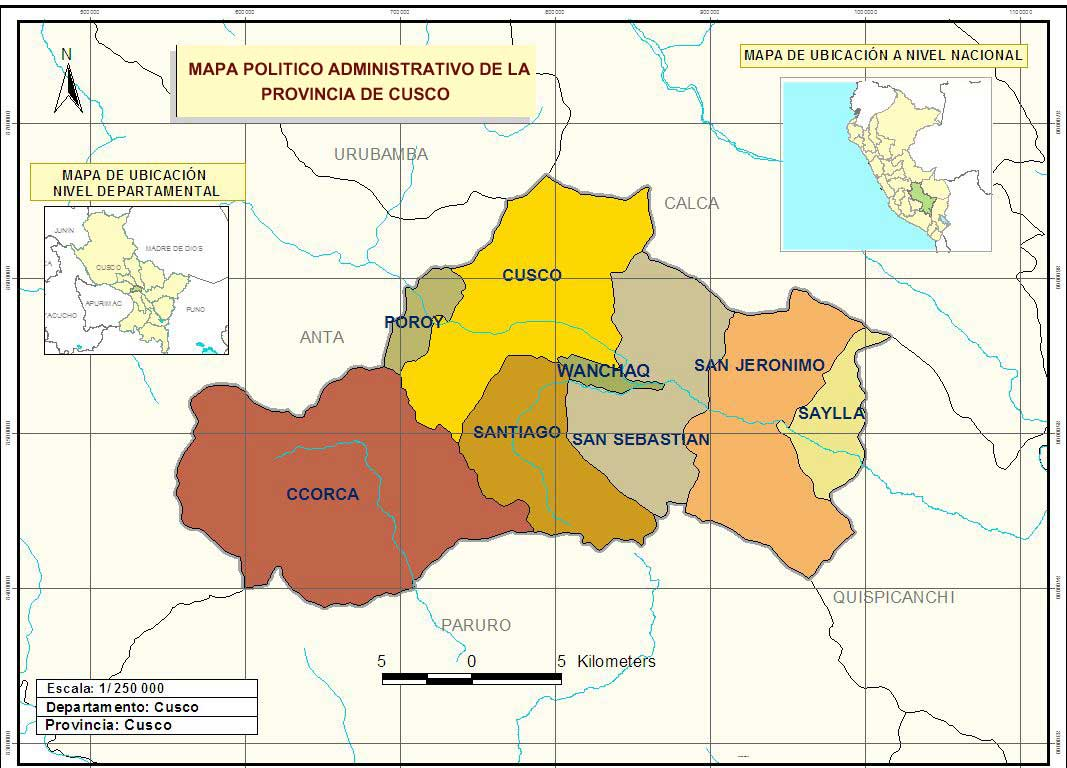
- Location of Santiago in the Cusco province
- Country: Peru
- Region: Cusco
- Province: Cusco
- Founded: June 10, 1955
- Capital: Santiago

Government
  - Mayor: Fermín García Fuentes (2019-2022)

Area
  - Total: 69.72 km^{2} (26.92 sq mi)
- Elevation: 3,400 m (11,200 ft)

Population (2025 census)
  - Total: 99,471
  - Density: 1,427/km^{2} (3,695/sq mi)
- Time zone: UTC-5 (PET)
- UBIGEO: 080106
- Website: www.munisantiago.gob.pe/

Santiago District is one of eight districts of the Cusco Province in Peru.

== Geography ==
One of the highest peaks of the district is Anawarkhi at 4,050 m (13,290 ft). Other mountains are listed below:

- Anka Wachana
- Araway Qhata
- Ichhu Urqu
- Muyu Urqu
- Ñustayuq
- Anahuarque
- Huanacaure
