= Anahuarque =

Mountain in Peru

- Location within Peru

Highest point
- Elevation: 4,050 m (13,290 ft)
- Coordinates: 13°34′40″S 71°57′20″W

Naming
- Language of name: Quechua

Geography
- Location: Peru, Cusco Region
- Parent range: Andes

Anahuarque (also spelled Anahuarqui, Ana Huarqui or Anawarki) is a mountain in the Andes of Peru southeast of the city of Cusco, about 4,050 metres (13,287 ft) high. It is located in the Cusco Region, Cusco Province, in the districts San Sebastián and Santiago, west of the mountain Wanakawri.

== See also ==
- Araway Qhata
- Pachatusan
- Pikchu
- Pillku Urqu
- Sinqa
