= Waqutu =

Archaeological site in Peru

- Location: Peru, Cusco Region, Cusco Province
- Region: Andes

Waqutu (Quechua for the name of an apu (god) / a variety of potatoes, also spelled Waqoto) is an archaeological site in Peru. It is located in the Cusco Region, Cusco Province, in the districts San Jerónimo and Saylla.
