= Wanchaq District =

Coordinates: 13.5300°S 71.9565°W

Wanchaq
- District
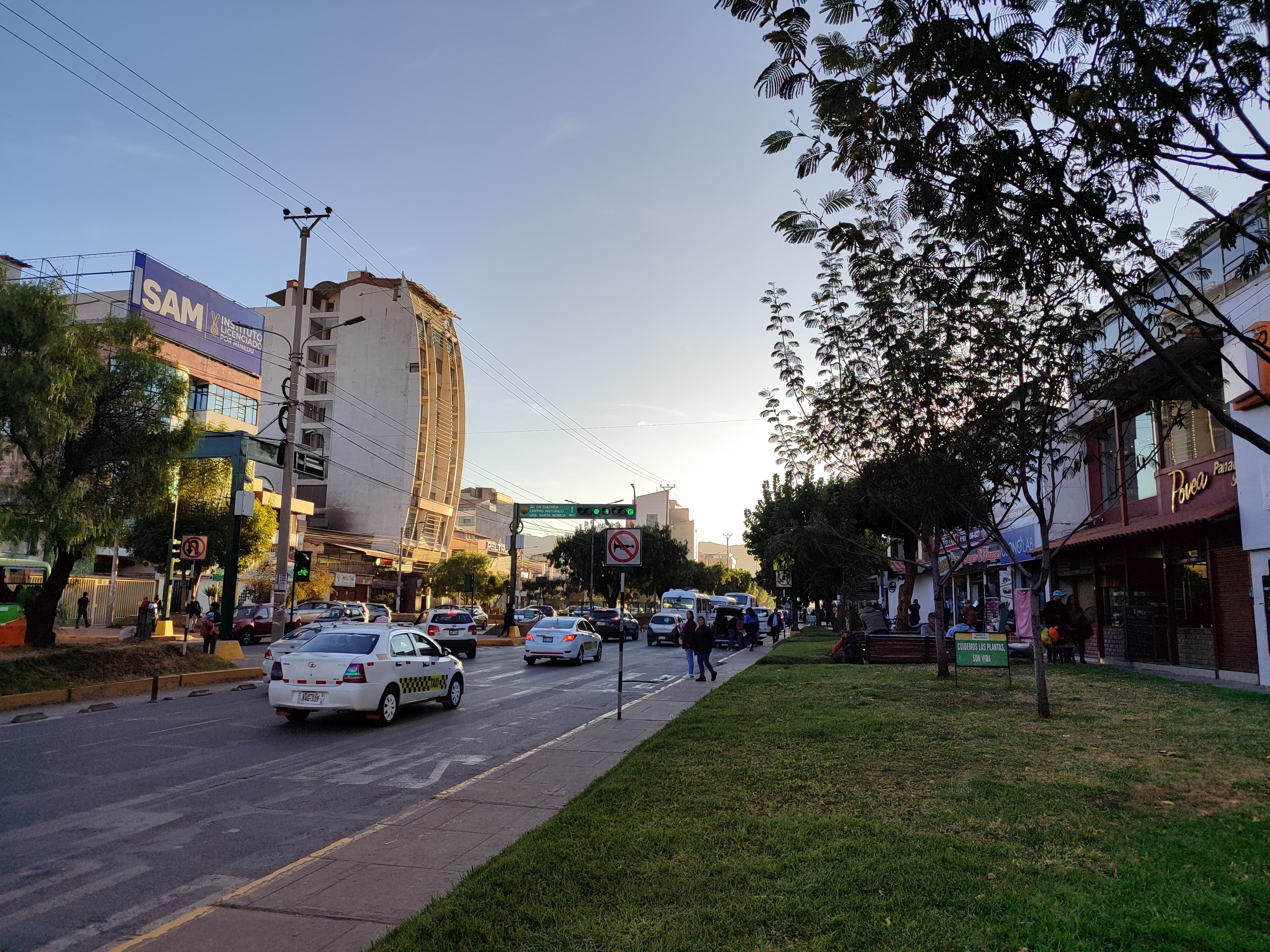
- La Cultura Avenue in the Wanchaq district
- Interactive map of Wanchaq
- Country: Peru
- Region: Cusco
- Province: Cusco
- Founded: June 10, 1955
- Capital: Wanchaq

Government
  - Mayor: Willy Carlos Cuzmar Del Castillo

Area
  - Total: 6.38 km^{2} (2.46 sq mi)
- Elevation: 3,366 m (11,043 ft)

Population (2025 census)
  - Total: 59,185
  - Density: 9,280/km^{2} (24,000/sq mi)
- Time zone: UTC-5 (PET)
- UBIGEO: 080108

Wanchaq District is one of eight districts of the province Cusco in Peru. It includes Avenida de la Cultura, and Avenida de los Incas. It is home to 2 hospitals, and borders the district of San Sebastian.
