= Pachatusan =

Archaeological site in Peru

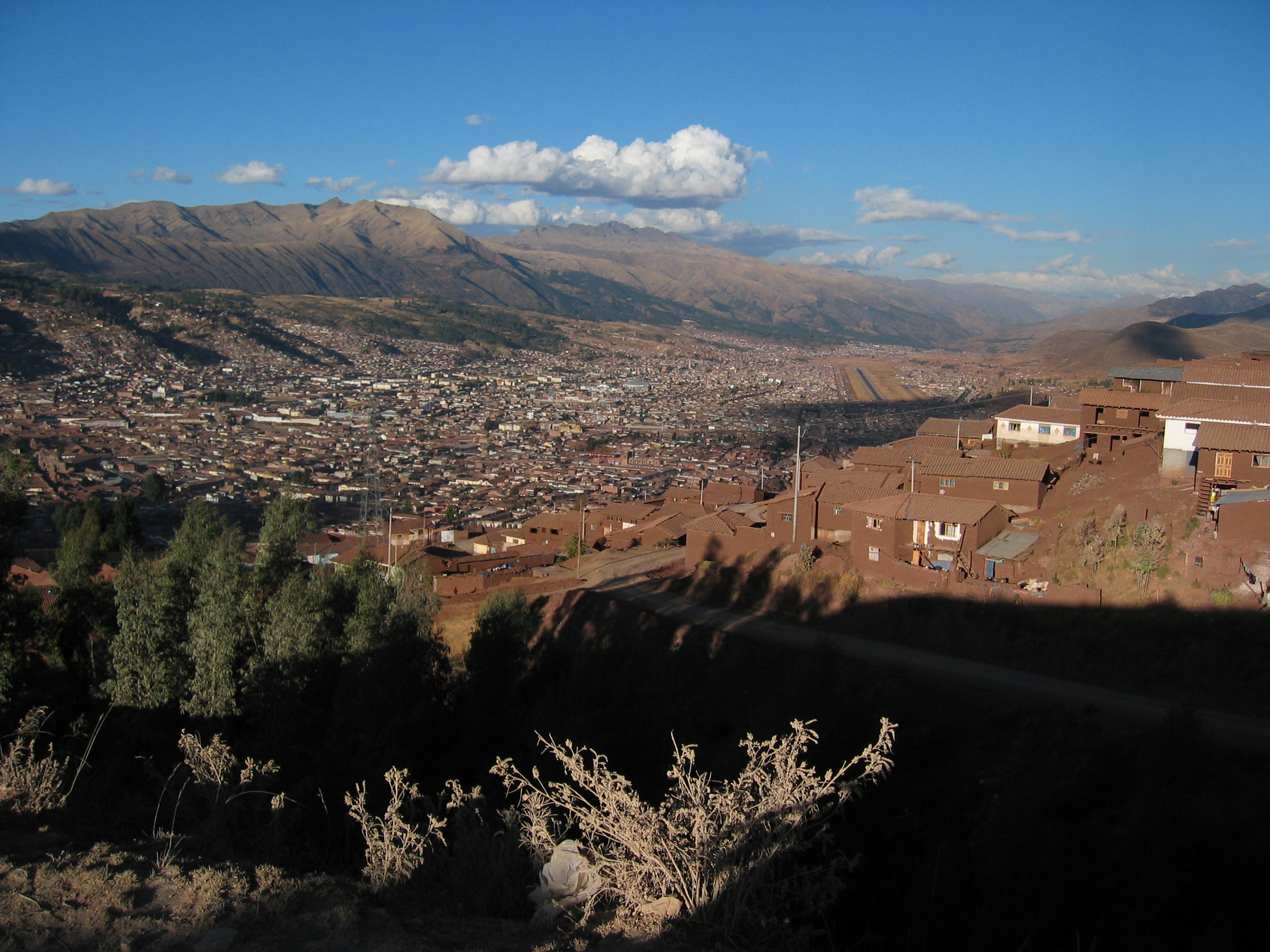
- Cusco with the mountains Pillku Urqu (on the left) and Pachatusan (center) in the background

Highest point
- Elevation: 4,842 m (15,886 ft)
- Coordinates: 13°31′10″S 71°46′50″W

Naming
- Language of name: Quechua

Geography
- Location within Peru
- Location: Peru, Cusco Region
- Parent range: Andes

Pachatusan (Quechua pacha earth, tusa, a prop to support a wall or building, pachatusa prop of the earth, -n a suffix) is a mountain northeast of the city of Cusco in the Andes of Peru, about 4,842 metres (15,886 ft) high. It is located in the Cusco Region, Calca Province, San Salvador District, in the Cusco Province, in the districts San Jerónimo and Saylla, and in the Quispicanchi Province, Oropesa District. It is situated on the western bank of the Vilcanota River, beside the mountain Huaypun in the south-east. Pachatusan lies above the sanctuary of San Salvador named Señor de Huanca.

By the local people Pachatusan is venerated as an apu.

On February 16, 2009, the cultural archaeological landscape of Pachatusan was declared a National Cultural Heritage by Resolución Directoral Nacional No. 231/INC.

== Gallery ==
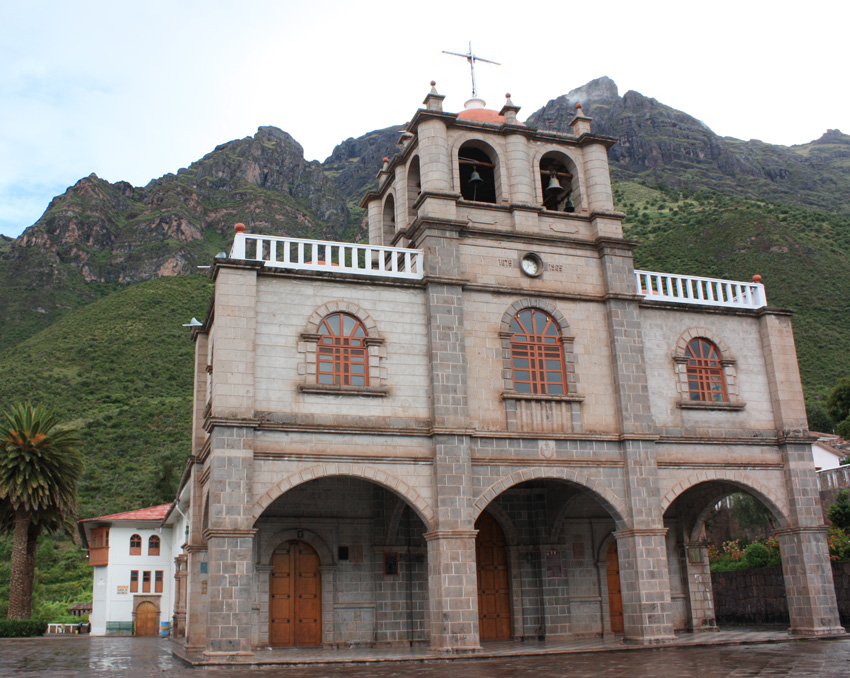
Pachatusan above the sanctuary Señor de Huanca

== See also ==
- Anawarkhi
- Araway Qhata
- Pikchu
- Pillku Urqu
- Sinqa
- Wanakawri
