= Rumiwasi =

Archaeological site in Peru

Rumiwasi Phaqchayuq
- Interactive map of Rumiwasi; Phaqchayuq
- 13°31′10″S 71°56′25″W
- Location: Peru, Cusco Region
- Region: Andes

Rumiwasi (Quechua rumi stone, wasi house, "stone house", hispanicized spelling Rumihuasi) or Phaqchayuq (Quechua phaqcha waterfall, -yuq a suffix to indicate ownership, "the one with a waterfall", hispanicized Phaqchayoc) is an archaeological site in Peru. It is located in the Cusco Region, Cusco Province, San Sebastián District, north of the central square of San Sebastián.
