= Inkilltambo =

Archaeological site in Peru

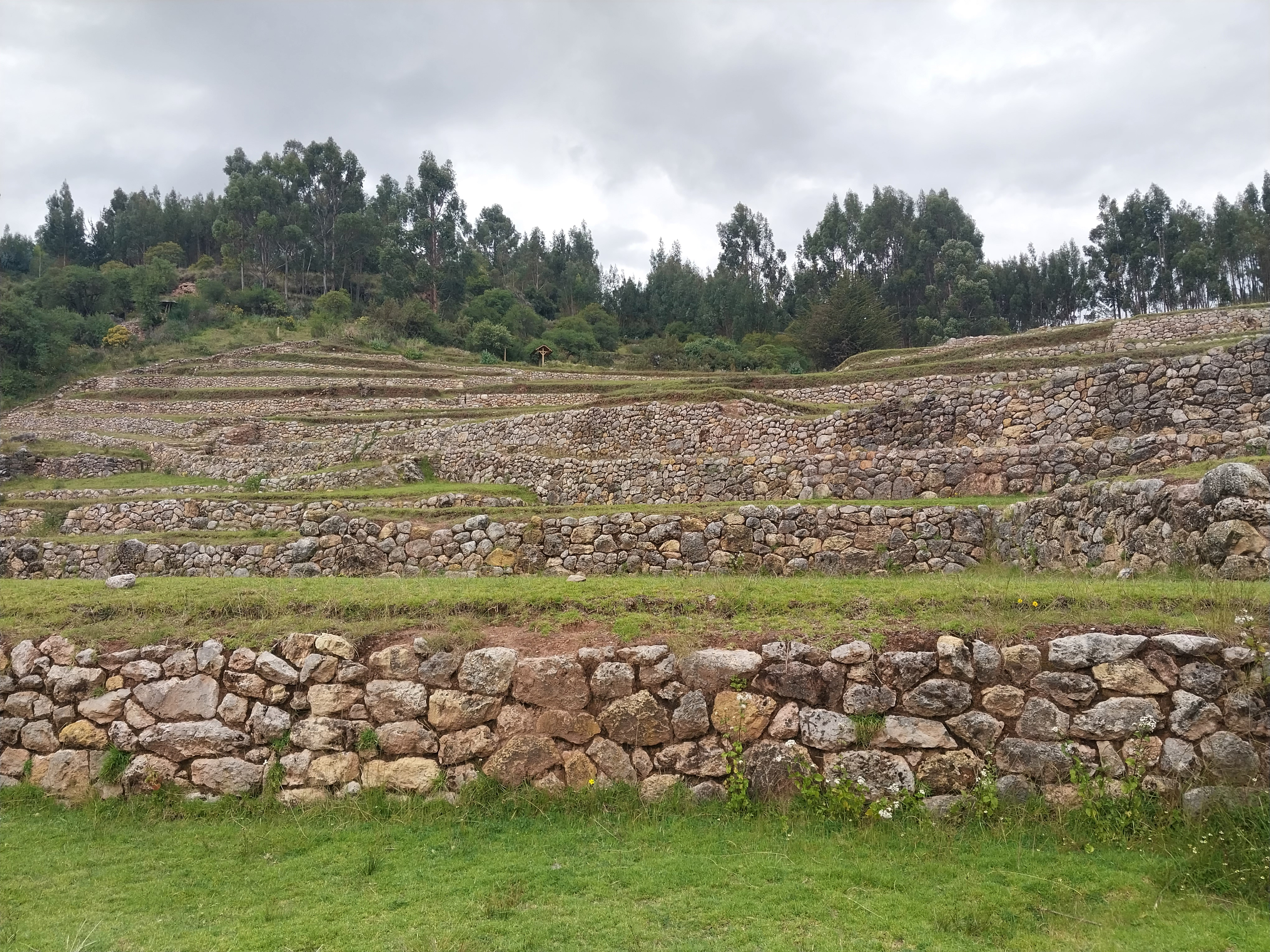

- Location within Peru
- 13°30′6.97″S 71°57′8.51″W
- Type: Settlement
- Cultures: Inca
- Location: Cusco Province, Cusco

Inkilltambo, Inquilltambo, Inquiltambo or Inkill Tampu (possibly from Quechua inkill terrain where plants are cultivated, especially ornamental ones, tampu inn) is an archaeological site in Peru. It is situated in the Cusco Region, Cusco Province, San Sebastián District.
