= Atahualpa =

Last Inca Emperor (ruled 1532–1533)

Atawallpa
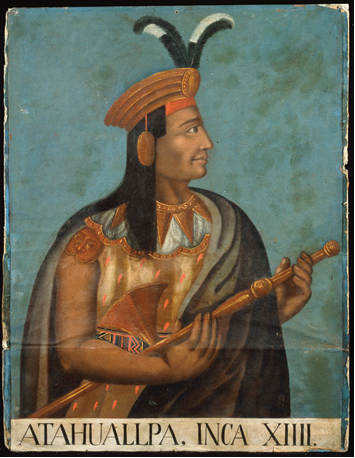
- Portrait of Atawallpa by an unknown artist from the Cuzco School. Currently located in the Ethnological Museum of Berlin, Germany.

Sapa Inca of the Inca Empire
- Reign: 1532 – 1533
- Self-installation: April 1532
- Predecessor: Huáscar
- Successor: Túpac Huallpa (as puppet Sapa Inca of the Inca Empire)
- Born: c. 1502; Quito, Inca Empire
- Died: 26 July 1533 (aged c. 31); Cajamarca, Inca Empire
- Burial: 29 August 1533; Cajamarca
- Consort: Coya Asarpay (queen); Cuxirimay Ocllo (secondary wife)
- Quechua: Atawallpa
- Dynasty: Hanan Qusqu
- Father: Huayna Cápac – Inca Emperor
- Mother: Discussed: Tocto Ocllo Coca; Paccha Duchicela; Túpac Palla
- Religion: Inca religion

Atawallpa (/ˌɑːtəˈwɑːlpə/), also Atahualpa or Ataw Wallpa (Classical Quechua: Ataw Wallpa, pronounced [ˈataw ˈwaʎpa]) (c. 1502 – 29 August 1533), whose regnal name was Caccha Pachacuti Inca Yupanqui Inca (from the caccha idol and to honour the emperor Pachacuti), was the last effective Inca emperor, reigning from April 1532 until his capture and execution in July-August of the following year, as part of the Spanish conquest of the Inca Empire.

== Biography ==
Atahualpa was the son of the emperor Huayna Cápac, who died around 1525 along with his successor, Ninan Cuyochi, in a smallpox epidemic. Atahualpa initially accepted his half-brother Huáscar as the new emperor, who in turn appointed him as governor of Quito in the north of the empire. The uneasy peace between them deteriorated over the next few years. Atahualpa sought to create an independent state in Quito. From 1529 to 1532, they contested the succession in the Inca Civil War. Huáscar managed to take Atawallpa prisoner. Atahualpa escaped and rallied his forces, winning several battles against Huáscar's forces before capturing Huáscar.

Around the same time as Atahualpa's victory, a group of Spanish conquistadors, led by Francisco Pizarro, arrived in the region. In November 1532, they captured Atahualpa during an ambush at Cajamarca. In captivity, Atahualpa gave a ransom in exchange for a promise of release and arranged for the execution of Huáscar. After receiving the ransom, the Spanish accused Atahualpa of treason, conspiracy against the Spanish Crown, and the murder of Huáscar. They put him on trial and sentenced him to death by burning at the stake. However, after his baptism in July 1533, he was garroted instead.

A line of successors continued to claim the title of emperor, either as Spanish vassals or as rebel leaders, but none were able to hold comparable power.

== Origin ==
=== Name ===
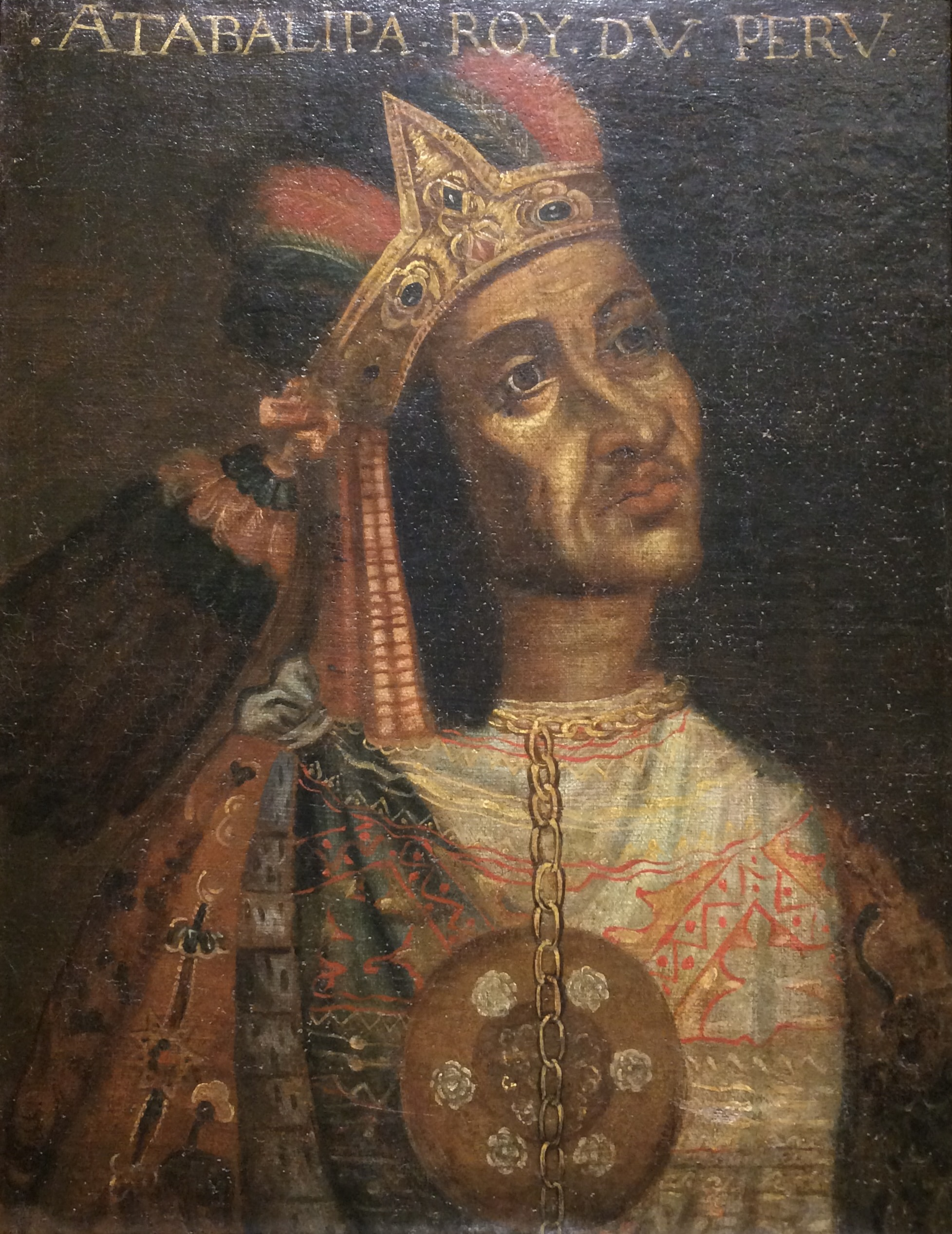
Atabalipa, King of Peru, 17th-century oil painting at the MuNa, Quito

Although this monarch's name is written with some major discrepancies in early sources, most spellings seem to reflect /ataw waʎpa/ (which in contemporary orthography would be written ⟨Ataw Wallpa⟩). As such, ⟨Atabalipa⟩, ⟨Tavalipa⟩ and others are spellings that represent the first impressionistic orthographies of his name.

Since the earliest Quechua dictionaries, atawallpa and wallpa were offered as the Quechua word for "chicken". For centuries several historians believed that this Sapa Inca's name came from the bird name. Some even translated the name as "happy rooster" or "bird of fortune". Considering such species was new in the Andes, contemporary scholars believe the etymological direction was the inverse: the bird species may have been named after the monarch, as already said by Blas Valera in the 16th century.

It has been proposed that this person name may have been a compound of two Puquina roots, ata-w "appointed, chosen" and wallpa "diligent or courageous". However, this analysis is not consensual.

=== Birth ===
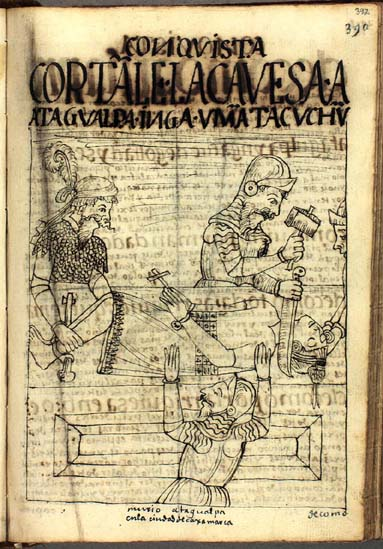
"The execution of Atahualpa Inca in Cajamarca: they behead him", drawn in 1615 by the chronicler Guaman Poma

There are uncertainties about Atawallpa's date and place of birth. He was likely born around the turn of the 16th century, c. 1502. There is disagreement on his place of birth. Below are the versions of some chroniclers and historians:

The chronicler and soldier Pedro Cieza de León, from his investigations among the members of the Inca nobility of Cusco, affirmed that Atawallpa had been born in Cusco and that his mother was Tuto Palla or Túpac Palla (Quechua names), an "India Quilaco" or "native of Quilaco". This demonym could allude to an ethnic group from the province of Quito and would imply that she was a second-class wife belonging to the regional elite. Cieza de León denied that Atawallpa was born in Quito or Caranqui and that his mother was the lady of Quito, as some at the time claimed, since Quito was a province of Tahuantinsuyo when Atawallpa was born. Therefore their kings and lords were the Incas.

According to Juan de Betanzos, Atawallpa was born in Cusco and his mother was a ñusta (Inca princess) from Cusco of the lineage of Inca Yupanqui (Pachacuti).

In the 18th century the priest Juan de Velasco, using as a source a work by Marcos de Niza, whose existence has not been confirmed, compiled information about the Kingdom of Quito (whose existence has not been confirmed either). According to de Velasco, the Kingdom of Quito was made up of the Shyris or Scyris ethnic group and disappeared when it was conquered by the Incas. This work includes a list of the kings of Quito, the last of whom, Cacha Duchicela, would have been the Kuraka (Inca cacique) defeated and killed by the Inca Huayna Cápac. Paccha, the daughter of Cacha Duchicela, would have married Huayna Cápac, and from that union Atawallpa would have been born as a legitimate son. Several historians, such as the Peruvian Raúl Porras Barrenechea and the Ecuadorian Jacinto Jijón y Caamaño, have rejected this version for lack of historical and archaeological foundation.

Most Peruvian historians maintain that, according to the most reliable chronicles (Cieza, Sarmiento and Betanzos, who took their reports firsthand), Atawallpa was born in Cusco and his mother was a princess of Inca lineage. These historians consider that Huáscar's side invented the version of Atawallpa's Quito origin to show him to the Spanish as a usurper and bastard. They also believe that many chroniclers interpreted the division of the empire between the two sons of Huayna Cápac (Huáscar, the eldest son and legitimate heir; and Atawallpa, the bastard and usurper) according to their European or Western conception of political mores. According to Rostworowski this is wrong because the right to the Inca throne did not depend exclusively on primogeniture or paternal line (because the son of the Inca's sister could also be heir) but also practical considerations such as the ability to command.

Ecuadorian historians have conflicting opinions:

- According to Hugo Burgos Guevara, the fact that Topa Yupanqui was born in Vilcashuamán and his son Huayna Capac in Tomebamba seems to indicate that Atawallpa was born in Quito as part of an expansionist policy of the empire and as a way to reinforce a political-religious conquest.
- Other Ecuadorian historians, such as Enrique Ayala Mora, consider it more likely that Atawallpa was born in Caranqui, in the current province of Imbabura, in the Ibarra canton (Ecuador). They base this idea on the chronicles of Fernando de Montesinos and Pedro Cieza de León (although the latter mentions said version to refute it, in favor of the one from Cusco).
- Tamara Estupiñan Viteri, a historian who has published numerous works regarding Atawallpa and his close circle at that time, maintains that he was born in Cusco.

Summary of chroniclers and historians
Chronicler or historian	Origin of Atawallpa	Summary of his version	Reliability data
Juan de Betanzos (1510–1576)	Cuzco	Atawallpa was born in Cusco while his father was on campaign in Contisuyo. His mother was the ñusta Palla Coca.	He was fluent in Quechua and married Cuxirimay Ocllo, Atawallpa's cousin and fiancée.
Pedro Cieza de León (1520–1554)	Cuzco	Atawallpa and Huáscar were born in Cusco. According to the most widespread version heard, his mother was a Quilaco Indian.	It is based on oral testimonies of noble Incas. He has been called the "prince of Spanish chroniclers".
Francisco López de Gómara (1511–1559)	Quito	Atawallpa's mother was from Quito.	He was never in Peru and only reproduces information from other chroniclers.
Pedro Sarmiento de Gamboa (1530–1592)	Cusco	Atawallpa's mother was Tocto Coca, of the Hatun Ayllu lineage.	He personally consulted the Cusco nobles, with whom Atawallpa had a good relationship.
Inca Garcilaso de la Vega (1539–1616)	Quito	Atawallpa's mother was the crown princess of the Kingdom of Quito, and Atawallpa was born there.	The historical accuracy of his work is questioned.
Felipe Guamán Poma de Ayala (1535–1616)	?	Atawallpa was a bastard Auqui (prince) and his mother was of the Chachapoya culture ethnic group (northern present-day Peru).	The information in his work is often confusing and contradictory.
Juan de Santa Cruz Pachacuti (16th–17th century)	Cuzco	Atawallpa's mother was ñusta Tocto Ocllo Coca. Atawallpa was born in Cusco before Huayna Cápac traveled north.	Indigenous chronicler connoisseur of Quechua.
Bernabé Cobo (1582–1657)	Cuzco	Atawallpa was born in Cusco and his mother was the ñusta Tocto Coca.	He wrote in the 17th century compiling the information that he believed was most reliable.
Agustín de Zárate (1514–1585)	?	Atawallpa's mother was from Quito. It does not imply that Atawallpa was conclusively born in Quito.	His information is brief.
Miguel Cabello de Balboa (1535–1608)	Cuzco	When Huayna Cápac made his last trip from Cusco to Quito, he took Atawallpa with him because his mother had died. This would imply that Atawallpa was born in Cusco.	It is an independent source that agrees with that of the most reliable chroniclers.
Juan de Velasco (1727–1792)	Quito	Atawallpa's mother was a Shyri princess of the Kingdom of Quito named Paccha and was one of the four legitimate wives of Huayna Cápac.	Historians Raúl Porras Barrenechea and Jacinto Jijón y Caamaño have refuted this version for lacking a historical basis. In addition, de Velasco is a very late author (18th century).

== Childhood and youth ==
Atawallpa spent his childhood with his father in Cusco. At the beginning of his adolescence, he went through the Warachikuy, a rite of passage that marked the passage to adulthood.

When Atawallpa was thirteen years old, there was a rebellion in the north of the empire by two peoples from that region, the Caranquis and the Cayambis. Together with his father and his brother, Ninan Cuyuchi marched at the head of the Inca army towards the northern provinces (Quito region). Four governors remained in Cusco, including Huáscar. Atawallpa stayed in Quito with his father for more than ten years, helping him put down rebellions and conquer new lands. For this he had the support of skilled Inca generals, such as Chalcuchímac and Quizquiz. During this period he learned government tasks and gained prestige for the courage he displayed in war actions.

The chroniclers described Atawallpa as someone of "lively reasoning and with great authority".

== Pre-conquest ==
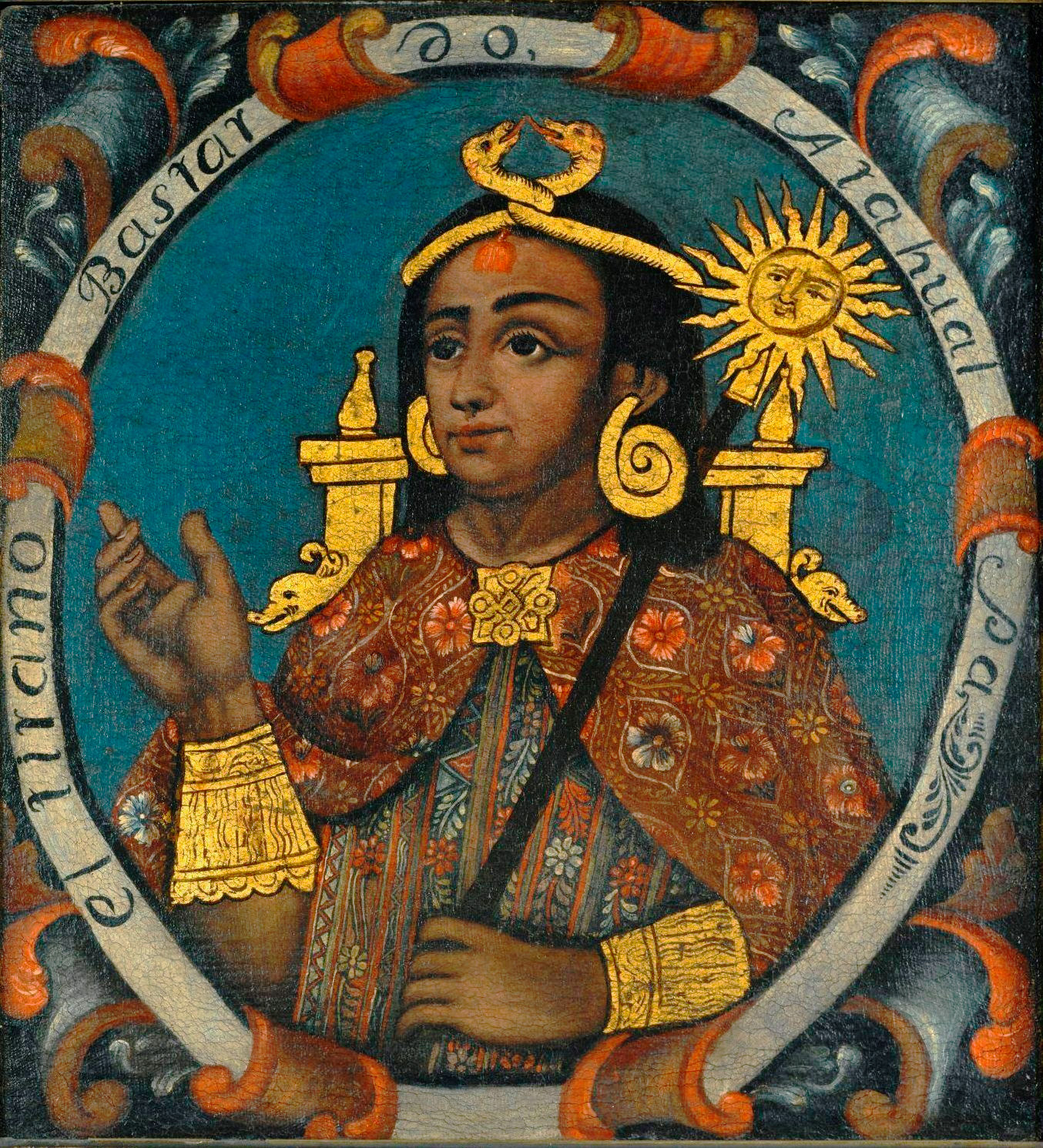
The bastard tyrant, Atahualpa, 18th-century painting by the Cuzco School (Brooklyn Museum)

Throughout the Inca Empire's history, each Sapa Inca worked to expand the territory of the empire. When Pachacuti, the 9th Sapa Inca ruled, he expanded the empire to northern Peru. At this point, Pachacuti sent his son Tupac Inca Yupanqui to invade and conquer the territory of present-day Ecuador. News of the expansion of the Inca reached the different tribes and nations of Ecuador. As a defense against the Inca, the Andean chiefdoms formed alliances with each other.

Around 1460, Tupac Inca Yupanqui, with an army of 200,000 warriors that were sent by his father, easily gained control of the Palta nation in southern Ecuador and northern Peru in a matter of months. However, the Inca army met fierce resistance from the defending Cañari, which left the Incas so impressed that after they were defeated, the Cañari were recruited into the Inca army. In northern Ecuador, the Inca army met fiercer resistance from an alliance between the Quitu and the Cañari. After defeating them in the battle of Atuntaqui, Tupac Yupanqui sent settlers to what is now the city of Quito and left as governor Chalco Mayta, belonging to the Inca nobility.

Around 1520, the tribes of Quitu, Caras and Puruhá rebelled against the Inca Huayna Cápac. He personally led his army and defeated the rebels in the battle of Laguna de Yahuarcocha where there was such a massacre that the lake turned to blood. According to Juan de Velasco, the alliance of the northern tribes collapsed and finally ended when Huayna Cápac married Paccha Duchicela, queen of the Shyris, making them recognize him as monarch, this marriage was the basis of the alliance that guaranteed the Inca power in the area.

After Huayna Capac died in 1527, Atawallpa was appointed governor of Quito by his brother Huáscar.

== Inca Civil War ==
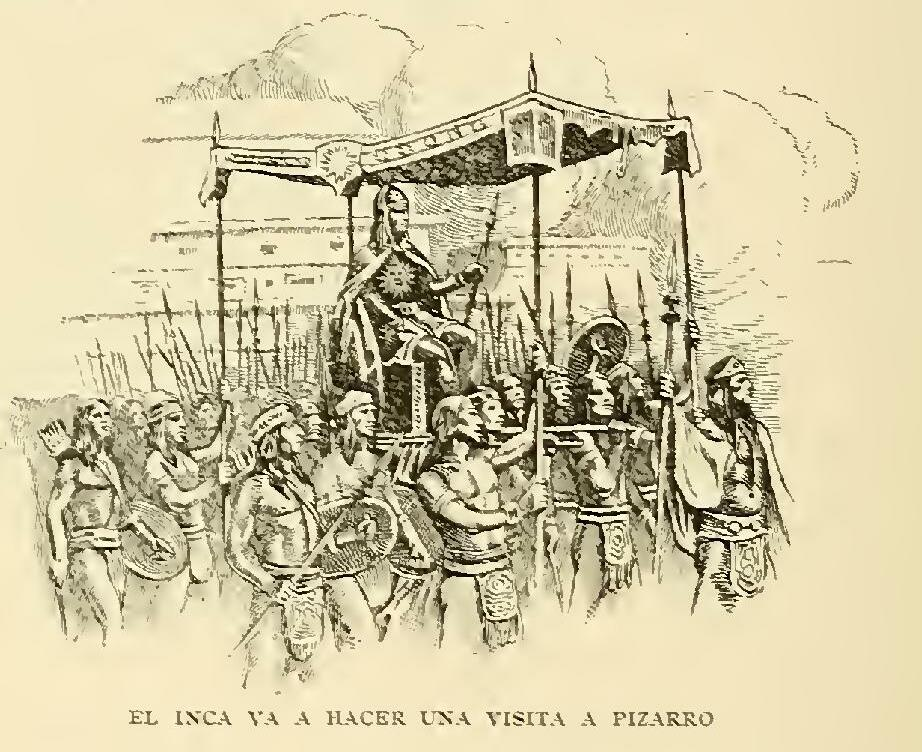
The Inca coming to meet Pizarro

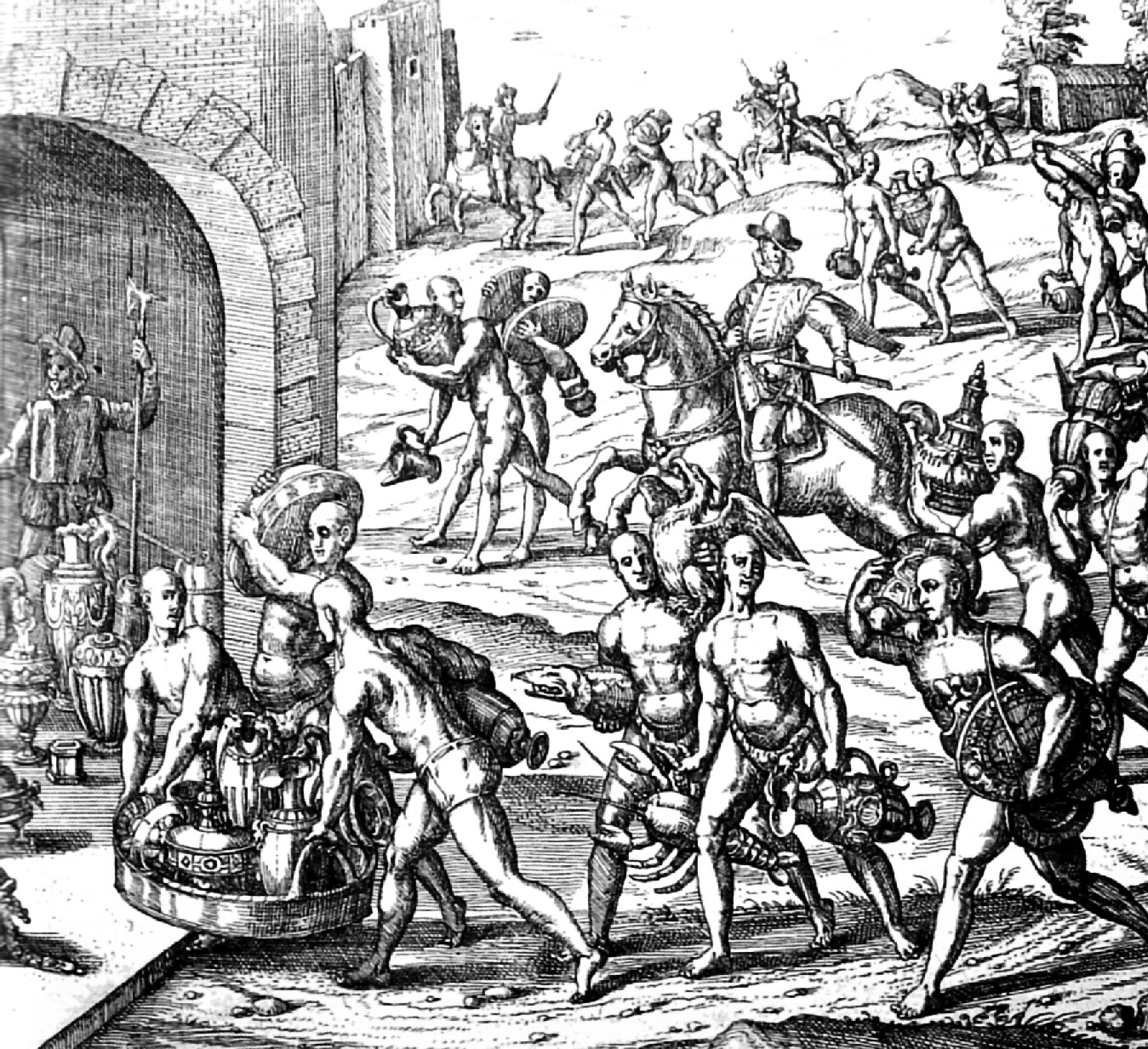
Engraving by Protestant Theodor de Bry, 16th century, "Ransom payment of Atahualpa brought to Francisco Pizarro at Cajamarca", Bibliothèque nationale de France.

Huáscar saw Atawallpa as the greatest threat to his power but did not dethrone him to respect the wishes of his late father. A tense five-year peace ensued; Huáscar took advantage of that time to get the support of the Cañari, a powerful ethnic group that dominated extensive territories of the north of the empire and maintained grudges against Atawallpa, who had fought them during his father's campaigns. By 1529 the relationship between the two brothers had quite deteriorated. According to the chronicler Pedro Pizarro, Huáscar sent an army to the North, which ambushed Atawallpa in Tumebamba and defeated him. Atawallpa was captured and imprisoned in a "tambo" (roadside shelters built for the Chasqui), but succeeded in escaping. During his time in captivity, he was cut and lost an ear. From then on he wore a headpiece that fastened under his chin to hide the injury. But the chronicler Miguel Cabello de Balboa said that this story of capture was improbable because if Atawallpa had been captured by Huáscar's forces, they would have executed him immediately.

Atawallpa returned to Quito and amassed a great army. He attacked the Cañari of Tumebamba, defeating its defenses and levelling the city and the surrounding lands. He arrived in Tumbes, from which he planned an assault by rafts on the island Puná. During the naval operation, Atawallpa sustained a leg injury and returned to land. Taking advantage of his retreat, the "punaneños" (inhabitants of Puña) attacked Tumbes. They destroyed the city, leaving it in the ruined state recorded by the Spaniards in early 1532.

From Cuzco the Huascarites, led by the armies of general Atoc, defeated Atawallpa in the battle of Chillopampa. The Atahualapite generals responded quickly; they gathered together their scattered troops, counter-attacked and forcefully defeated Atoc in Mulliambato. They captured Atoc and later tortured and killed him.

The Atahualapite forces continued to be victorious, as a result of the strategic abilities of Quizquiz and Chalcuchímac. Atawallpa began a slow advance on Cuzco. While based in Marcahuamachuco, he sent an emissary to consult the oracle of the Huaca (god) Catequil, who prophesied that Atawallpa's advance would end poorly. Furious at the prophecy, Atawallpa went to the sanctuary, killed the priest and ordered the temple to be destroyed. During this period, he first learned that Pizarro and his expedition had arrived in the empire.

Atawallpa's leading generals were Quizquiz, Chalcuchímac and Rumiñawi. In April 1532, Quizquiz and his companions led the armies of Atawallpa to victory in the battles of Mullihambato, Chimborazo and Quipaipán. The Battle of Quipaipán was the final one between the warring brothers. Quizquiz and Chalcuchimac defeated Huáscar's army, captured him, killed his family and seized the capital, Cuzco. Atawallpa had remained behind in the Andean city of Cajamarca, where he encountered the Spanish, led by Pizarro.

== Spanish conquest ==
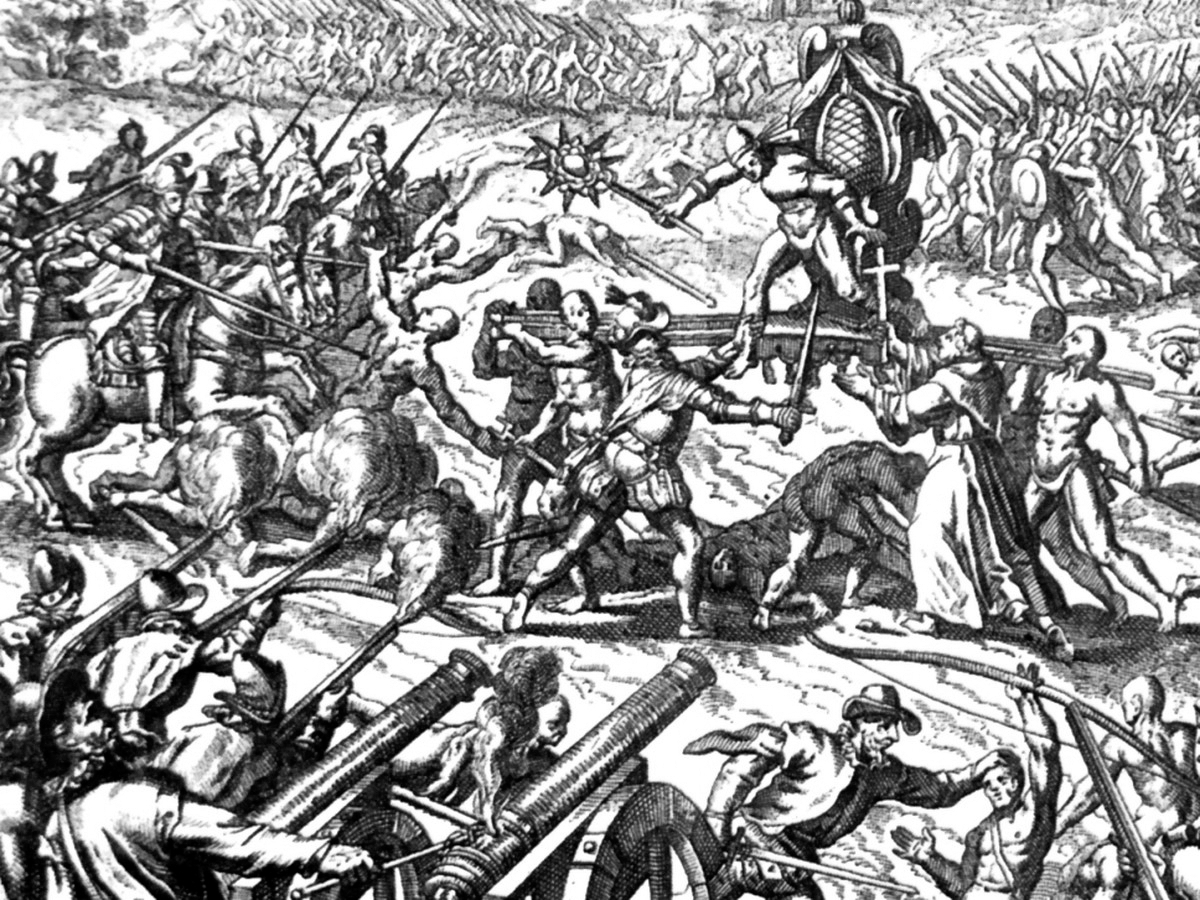
Emperor Atahualpa during the Battle of Cajamarca

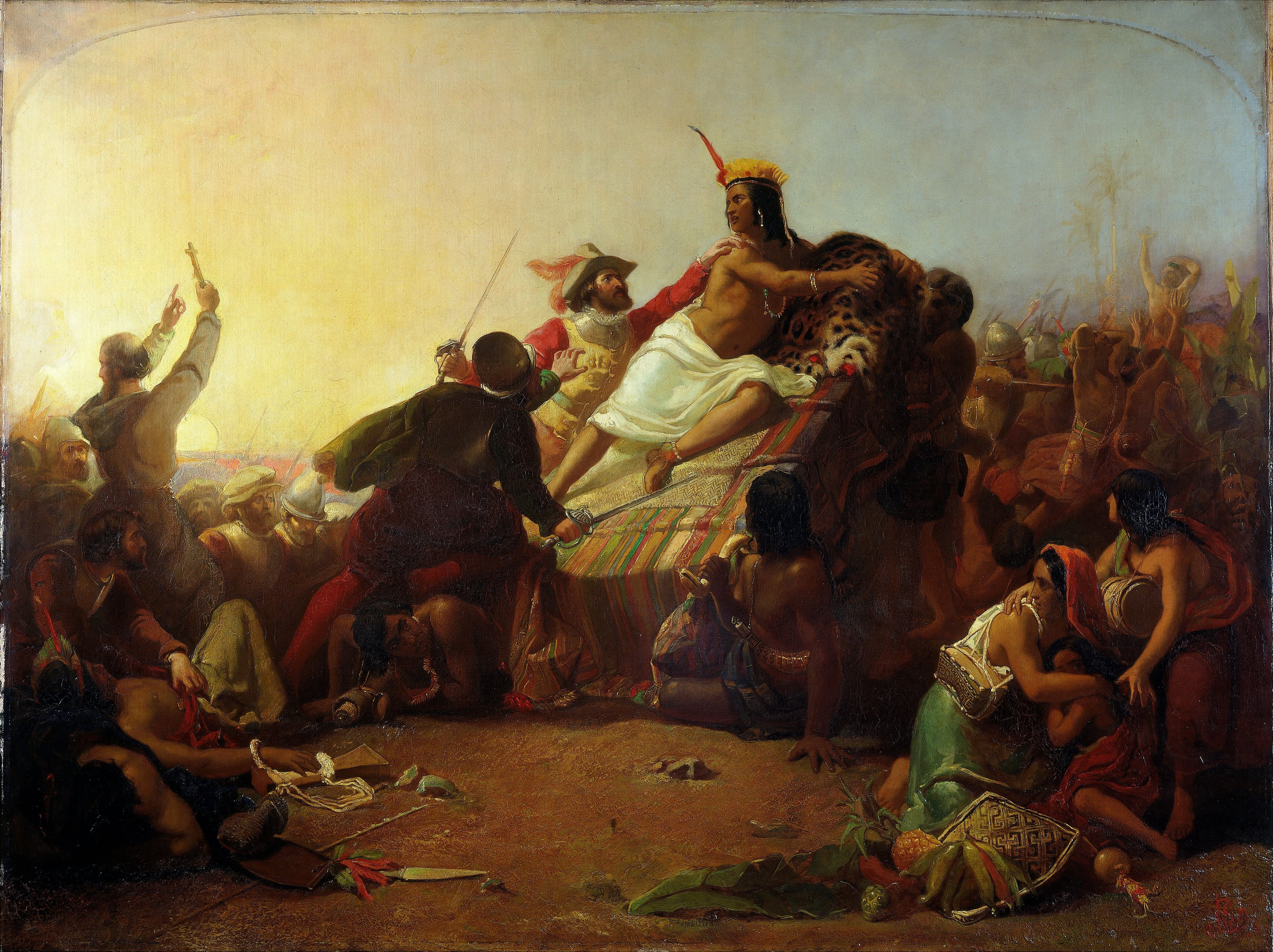
Pizarro Seizing the Inca of Peru by John Everett Millais, 1846

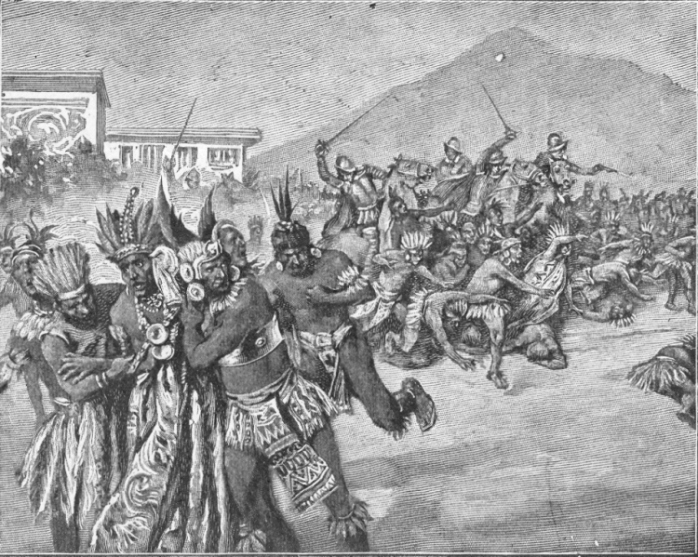
The Spanish attack the escort of Inca Atahualpa.

In January 1531, a Spanish expedition led by Francisco Pizarro, on a mission to conquer the Inca Empire, landed on Puná Island. Pizarro brought with him 180 men and 37 horses. The Spaniards headed south and occupied Tumbes, where they heard about the civil war that Huáscar and Atawallpa were waging against each other. About a year and a half later, in September 1532, after reinforcements had arrived from Spain, Pizarro founded the city of San Miguel de Piura and then marched towards the heart of the Inca Empire with a force of 106 foot-soldiers and 62 horsemen. Atawallpa, in Cajamarca with his army of 80,000 troops, heard that this party of strangers was advancing into the empire and sent an Inca noble to investigate. The noble stayed for two days in the Spanish camp, making an assessment of the Spaniards' weapons and horses. Atawallpa decided that the 168 Spaniards were not a threat to him and his 80,000 troops, so he sent word inviting them to visit Cajamarca and meet him, expecting to capture them. Pizarro and his men thus advanced unopposed through some very difficult terrain. They arrived at Cajamarca on 15 November 1532.

Atawallpa and his army had camped on a hill just outside Cajamarca. He was staying in a building close to the Konoj hot springs, while his soldiers were in tents set up around him. When Pizarro arrived in Cajamarca, the town was mostly empty except for a few hundred acllas. The Spaniards were billeted in certain long buildings on the main square and Pizarro sent an embassy to the Inca, led by Hernando de Soto. The group consisted of 15 horsemen and an interpreter; shortly thereafter de Soto sent 20 more horsemen as reinforcements in case of an Inca attack. These were led by Francisco Pizarro's brother, Hernando Pizarro.

The Spaniards invited Atawallpa to visit Cajamarca to meet Pizarro, which he resolved to do the following day. Meanwhile, Pizarro was preparing an ambush to trap the Inca: while the Spanish cavalry and infantry were occupying three long buildings around the square, some musketeers and four pieces of artillery were located in a stone structure in the middle of the square. The plan was to persuade Atawallpa to submit to the authority of the Spaniards and, if this failed, there were two options: a surprise attack, if success seemed possible or to keep up a friendly stance if the Inca forces appeared too powerful.

The following day, Atawallpa left his camp at midday, preceded by a large number of men in ceremonial attire; as the procession advanced slowly, Pizarro sent his brother Hernando to invite the Inca to enter Cajamarca before nightfall. Atawallpa entered the town late in the afternoon in a litter carried by eighty lords; with him were four other lords in litters and hammocks and 5,000–6,000 men carrying small battle axes, slings and pouches of stones underneath their clothes. "He was very drunk from what he had imbibed in the (thermal) baths before leaving as well as what he had taken during the many stops on the road. In each of them he had drunk well. And even there on his litter he requested drink". The Inca found no Spaniards in the plaza, as they were all inside the buildings. The only man to emerge was the Dominican friar Vincente de Valverde with an interpreter.

Although there are different accounts as to what Valverde said, most agree that he invited the Inca to come inside to talk and dine with Pizarro. Atawallpa instead demanded the return of everything the Spaniards had taken since they landed. According to eyewitness accounts, Valverde spoke about the Catholic religion but did not deliver the requerimiento, a speech requiring the listener to submit to the authority of the Spanish Crown and accept the Christian faith. At Atawallpa's request, Valverde gave him his breviary but, after a brief examination, the Inca threw it to the ground; Valverde hurried back toward Pizarro, calling on the Spaniards to attack. At that moment, Pizarro gave the signal; the Spanish infantry and cavalry came out of their hiding places and charged the unsuspecting Inca retinue, killing a great number while the rest fled in panic. Pizarro led the charge on Atawallpa but captured him only after killing all those carrying him and turning over his litter. No Spanish soldiers were killed.

== Captivity and execution ==
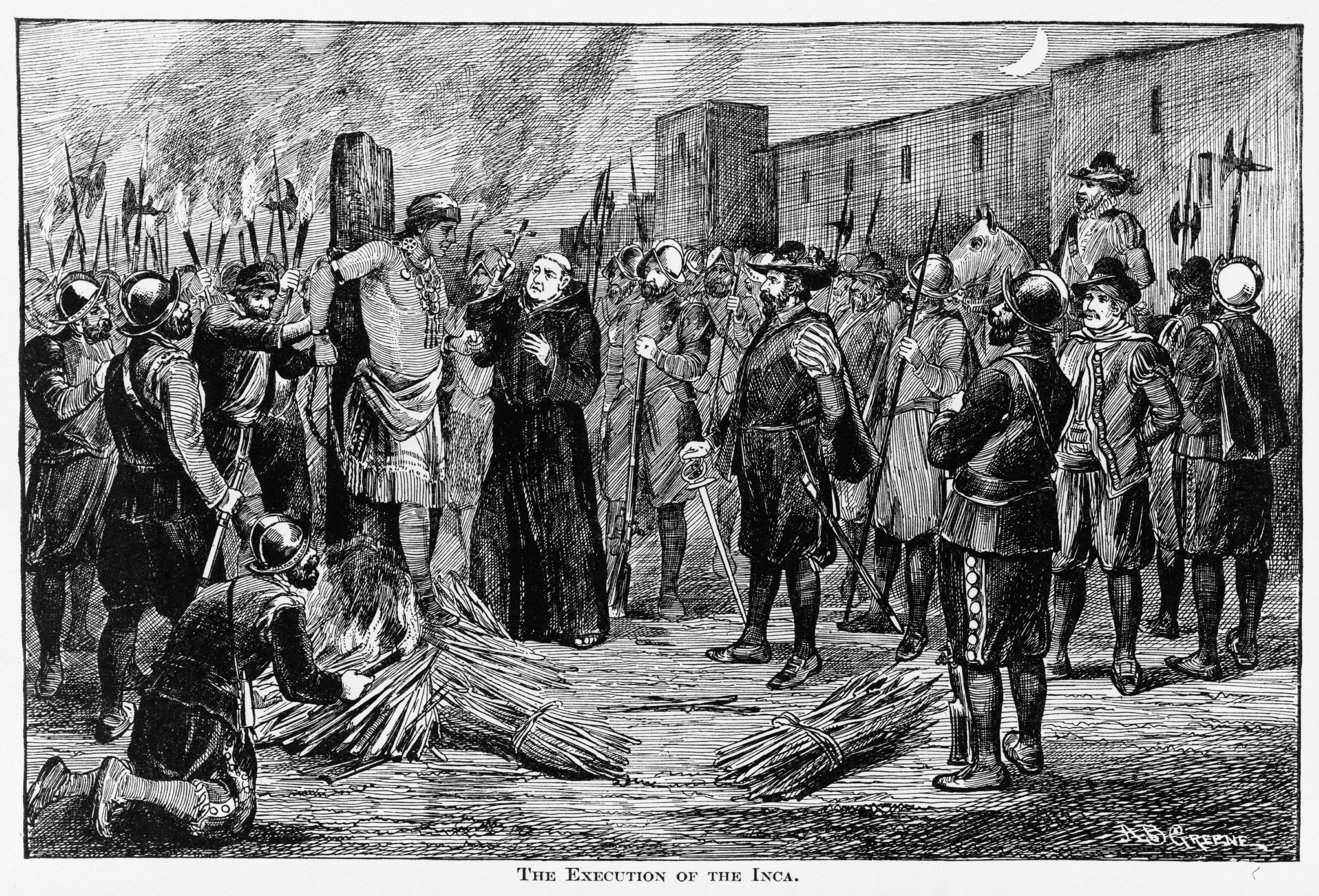
Execution of Atahualpa, on 26 July 1533

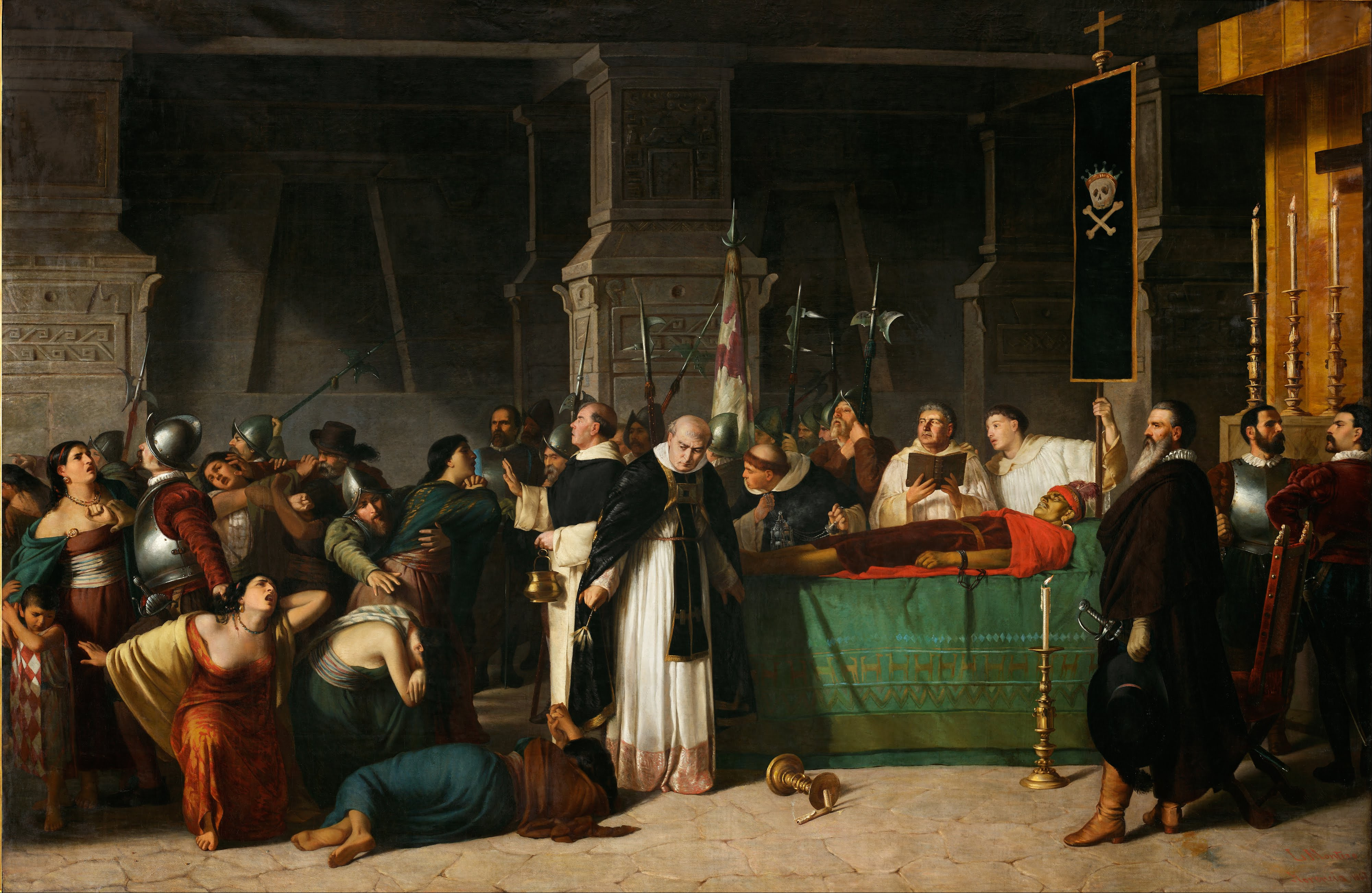
Funeral of Atahualpa (by Luis Montero Cáceres, 1867)

On 17 November, the Spaniards sacked the Inca army camp, in which they found great treasures of gold, silver and emeralds. Noticing their lust for precious metals, Atawallpa offered to fill a large room about 6.7 m (22 ft) long and 5.2 m (17 ft) wide up to a height of 2.4 m (8 ft) once with gold and twice with silver within two months. It is commonly believed that Atawallpa offered this ransom to regain his freedom, but Hemming says that he did so to save his life. None of the early chroniclers mention any commitment by the Spaniards to free Atawallpa once the metals were delivered.

After several months in fear of an imminent attack from general Rumiñawi, the outnumbered Spanish considered Atawallpa to be too much of a liability and decided to execute him. Pizarro staged a mock trial and found Atawallpa guilty of revolting against the Spanish, practicing idolatry and murdering Huáscar, his brother. Atawallpa was sentenced to death by burning at the stake. He was horrified, since the Inca believed that the soul would not be able to go on to the afterlife if the body were burned. Friar Vincente de Valverde, who had earlier offered his breviary to Atawallpa, intervened, telling Atawallpa that, if he agreed to convert to Catholicism, the friar could convince Pizarro to commute the sentence. Atawallpa agreed to be baptized.

On the morning of his death, Atawallpa was interrogated by his Spanish captors about his birthplace. Atawallpa declared that his birthplace was in what the Incas called the Kingdom of Quito, in a place called Caranqui (today located 2 km southeast of Ibarra, Ecuador). Most chroniclers agree, though other stories suggest various other birthplaces.

In accordance with his request, he was executed by strangling with a garrote on 26 July 1533. (Note: Some sources indicate Atawallpa was named after St. John the Baptist and killed on 29 August, the feast day of John the Baptist's beheading. Later research has proven this account to be incorrect.) His clothes and some of his skin were burned and his remains were given a Christian burial. Atawallpa was succeeded by his brother Túpac Huallpa and, later, by another brother, Manco Inca.

== Legacy ==
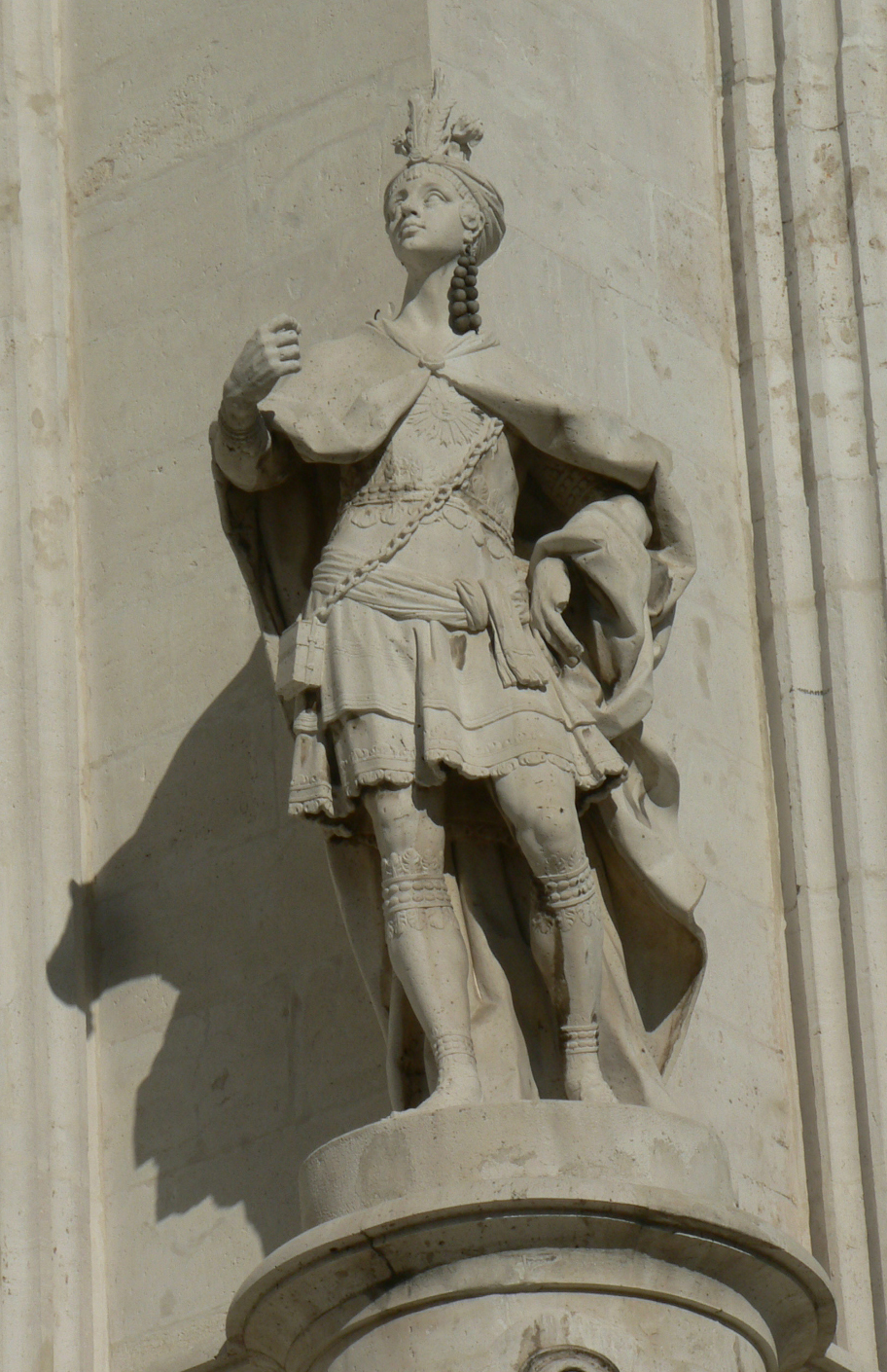
Statue of Atahualpa in the Royal Palace of Madrid

After the death of Pizarro, Quispe Sisa, Atawallpa's favorite sister, who had been given to Pizarro in marriage by her brother, married a Spanish knight named Ampuero and left for Spain. They took her daughter by Pizarro with them and she was later legitimised by imperial decree. Francisca Pizarro Yupanqui married her uncle Hernando Pizarro in Spain, on 10 October 1537 – they had a son, Francisco Pizarro y Pizarro. The Pizarro line survived Hernando's death, although it is extinct in the male line. Among Inés's direct descendants, having Inca royal ancestry, at least three governed Latin American nations during the 19th and early 20th centuries: Dominican President José Desiderio Valverde and Bolivian Presidents Pedro José Domingo de Guerra and José Gutiérrez Guerra. Pizarro's third son, by a relative of Atawallpa renamed Angelina who was never legitimised, died shortly after reaching Spain. Another relative, Catalina Capa-Yupanqui, who died in 1580, married a Portuguese nobleman named António Ramos, son of António Colaço. Their daughter was Francisca de Lima who married Álvaro de Abreu de Lima, who was also a Portuguese nobleman.

In Quito, the most important football stadium is named Estadio Atahualpa after Atawallpa.

On the façade of the Royal Palace of Madrid there is a statue of the Inca emperor Atawallpa, along with another of the Aztec emperor Moctezuma II, among the statues of the kings of the ancient kingdoms that formed Spain.

=== Inkarri ===
A myth concerning Atawallpa's death and future resurrection became widespread among indigenous groups, with versions of the tale being documented as far as among the Huilliche people of southern Chile. A rare version recorded by Tom Dillehay among the Mapuche of Araucanía tells of Atawallpa killing Pedro de Valdivia.

== Remains ==
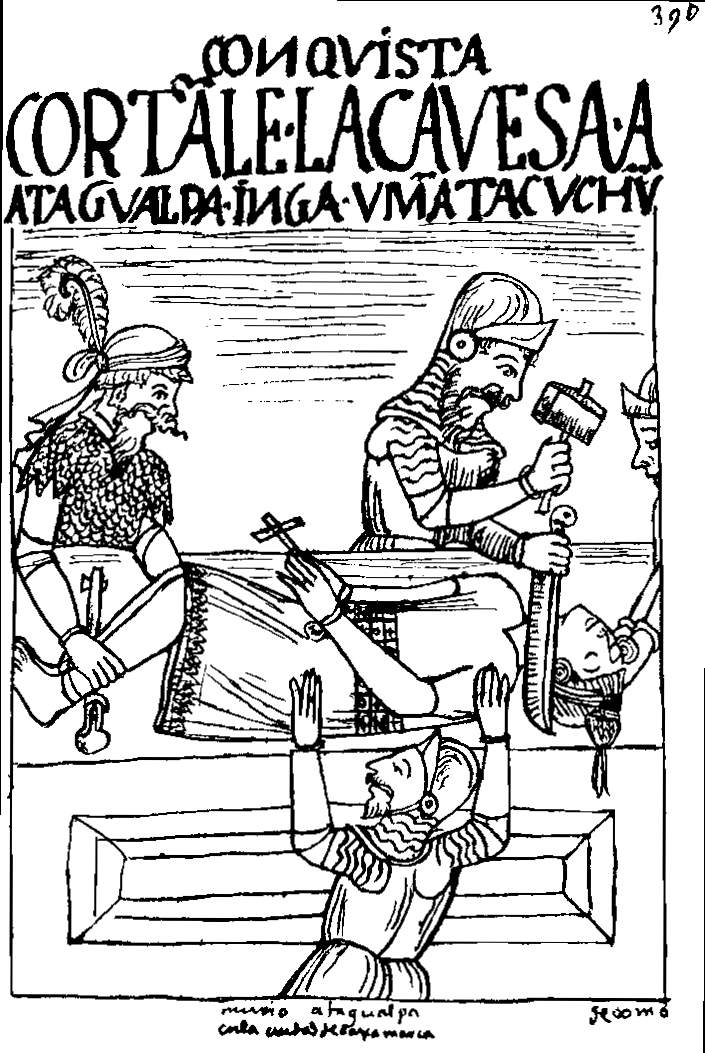
"Conquest: They behead Atahualpa Inca · VMÃTA CUCHṼ" [Quechua: umanta kuchun "(they) cut his head"]. Drawing in Guaman Poma's Nueva corónica.

The burial site of Atawallpa is unknown but historian Tamara Estupiñán argues it lies somewhere in modern-day Ecuador. She argues he was buried in Ecuador for safekeeping. The location is named Malqui-Machay, Quechua for "mummy", and stone walls and trapezoidal underground water canals have been found in this location. More serious archaeological excavation needs to be done to confirm Estupiñán's beliefs.

== In popular culture ==
A treasure hunt for Atawallpa's gold forms the basis for the second Biggles book, The Cruise of the Condor.

Atawallpa Inca's conflict with Pizarro was dramatised by Peter Shaffer in his play The Royal Hunt of the Sun, first staged by the National Theatre in 1964 at the Chichester Festival, then in London at the Old Vic. The role of Atawallpa was played by Robert Stephens and by David Carradine, who received a Theatre World Award in the 1965 Broadway production. Christopher Plummer portrayed Atawallpa in the 1969 movie version of the play.

The closing track of Tyrannosaurus Rex's debut album, My People Were Fair and Had Sky in Their Hair... But Now They're Content to Wear Stars on Their Brows, was entitled "Frowning Atahuallpa (My Inca Love)".

Atawallpa plays a key role in Laurent Binet's 2019 alternative history novel Civilizations, journeying across the Atlantic and going on to conquer much of Europe.

He is referenced in Alberto Belli's 2025 film Dora and the Search for Sol Dorado, with a depiction that he has left a magical bracelet that leads to a fallen star which has the power to grant a selfless wish.

He is a major character in the 2010 science fiction short story "Invaders" by John Kessel.

== See also ==
- History of the Inca
- Crown of the Andes

== Bibliography ==
- Bauer, Ralph (2005). An Inca Account of the Conquest of Peru. University Press of Colorado.
- Brundage, Burr Cartwright (1985). Empire of the Inca. University of Oklahoma Press. ISBN 9780806119243.
- De Betanzos, Juan (1996). Narrative of the Incas. Translated by Hamilton, Roland; Buchanan, Dana. University of Texas Press. ISBN 9780292755598.
- Cabello Balboa, Miguel (1951). Miscelánea antártica - una historia del Perú antiguo. Lima: Universidad Nacional Mayor de San Marcos. p. 364 (114).
- Cerrón-Palomino, Rodolfo (2017). "ETIMOLOGÍA POPULAR Y ETIMOLOGÍA CIENTÍFICA: EL CASO DE ATAWALLPA ~ WALLPA PARA DESIGNAR AL GALLO EN EL MUNDO ANDINO Y AMAZÓNICO". Lingüística (in Spanish). 33 (2). doi:10.5935/2079-312X.20170015 (inactive 5 July 2025). ISSN 2079-312X. Archived from the original on 29 September 2024.
- Cieza de León, Pedro (2005). El Señorio de los Incas. Caracas: Biblioteca Ayacucho.
- de Velasco, Juan (1789). Historia del Reino de Quito en la America Meridional.
- de Zárate, Agustín (1555). "Capítulo XII - Del estado en que estaban las guerras del Perú al tiempo que los españoles llegaron a ella.". Historia del descubrimiento y conquista del Perú. Julio Le Riverend.
- Espinoza Soriano, Waldemar (1997). Los Incas (in Spanish). Amaru Editores.
- Guamán Poma de Ayala, Felipe (1980). Nueva corónica y buen gobierno. Vol. 1 (1980 ed.). Biblioteca Ayacucho. p. 83. ISBN 9788466000567. Archived from the original on 29 September 2024.
- Guevara, Hugo Burgos (1 January 1995). El Guaman, el puma y el amaru: formación estructural del gobierno indígena en Ecuador. Editorial Abya Yala. ISBN 9789978041680.
- Hemming, John (1993). The Conquest of the Incas. Macmillan. ISBN 0333106830.
- Herrera Cuntti, Arístides (2004). Divagaciones históricas en la web (in Spanish). Vol. 2. AHC Ediciones. ISBN 9789972290824.
- Hewett, Edgar Lee (1968). Ancient Andean Life. Biblo & Tannen Publishers. ISBN 9780819602046. Archived from the original on 29 September 2024.
- Jacobi, Lauren; Zolli, Daniel M., eds. (2021). Contamination and Purity in Early Modern Art and Architecture (PDF). Amsterdam University Press. ISBN 9789462988699. Archived (PDF) from the original on 12 January 2023.
- Kauffmann Doig, Federico (1970). Arqueologia Peruana [Peruvian archaeology].
- Kubler, George (1945). "The Behavior of Atahualpa, 1531-1533". The Hispanic American Historical Review. 25 (4): 413–427. doi:10.2307/2508231. ISSN 0018-2168. JSTOR 2508231.
- Pease García-Yrigoyen, Franklin (1972). Los Últimos Incas del Cuzco [The Last Incas of Cuzco] (in Spanish). Instituto Nacional de Cultura. p. 97.
- Poma, Guamán (1615). Nueva corónica y buen gobierno. p. 392. Archived from the original on 3 November 2022 – via Royal Library, Denmark website.
- Prescott, William H. (1847). History of the Conquest of Peru. Vol. 2. Harper and Brothers. Archived from the original on 29 September 2024.
- Prescott, William H. (1892). History of the Conquest of Peru. Vol. 1. D. McKay.
- Prescott, William H. (13 October 1998). The Discovery and Conquest of Peru. Modern Library. ISBN 9780679603047.
- Quilter, Jeffrey (2014). The Ancient Central Andes. Routledge. p. 280.
- Rostworowski, Maria (1998). History of the Inca Realm. Translated by Iceland, Harry B. Cambridge University Press. ISBN 9780521637596.
- Rostworowski, Maria (2001). Pachacutec Inca Yupanqui (in Spanish). Instituto de Estudios Peruanos. ISBN 9972510603.
- MacQuarrie, Kim (2008). The Last Days of The Incas. Piatkus Books. ISBN 9780749929930.
- Sarmiento de Gamboa, Pedro (1572). History of the Incas. Translated by Markham, Clements. Project Gutenberg. Archived from the original on 7 March 2024.
- Sosa Freire, Rex (1996). Miscelánea histórica de Píntag (in Spanish). Editorial Abya Yala. ISBN 9978042016.
- Veatch, Arthur Clifford (1917). Quito to Bogotá. Doran.
- Favre, Henri (1972). Les Incas. Presses Universitaires de France.
