= Pambamarca Fortress Complex =

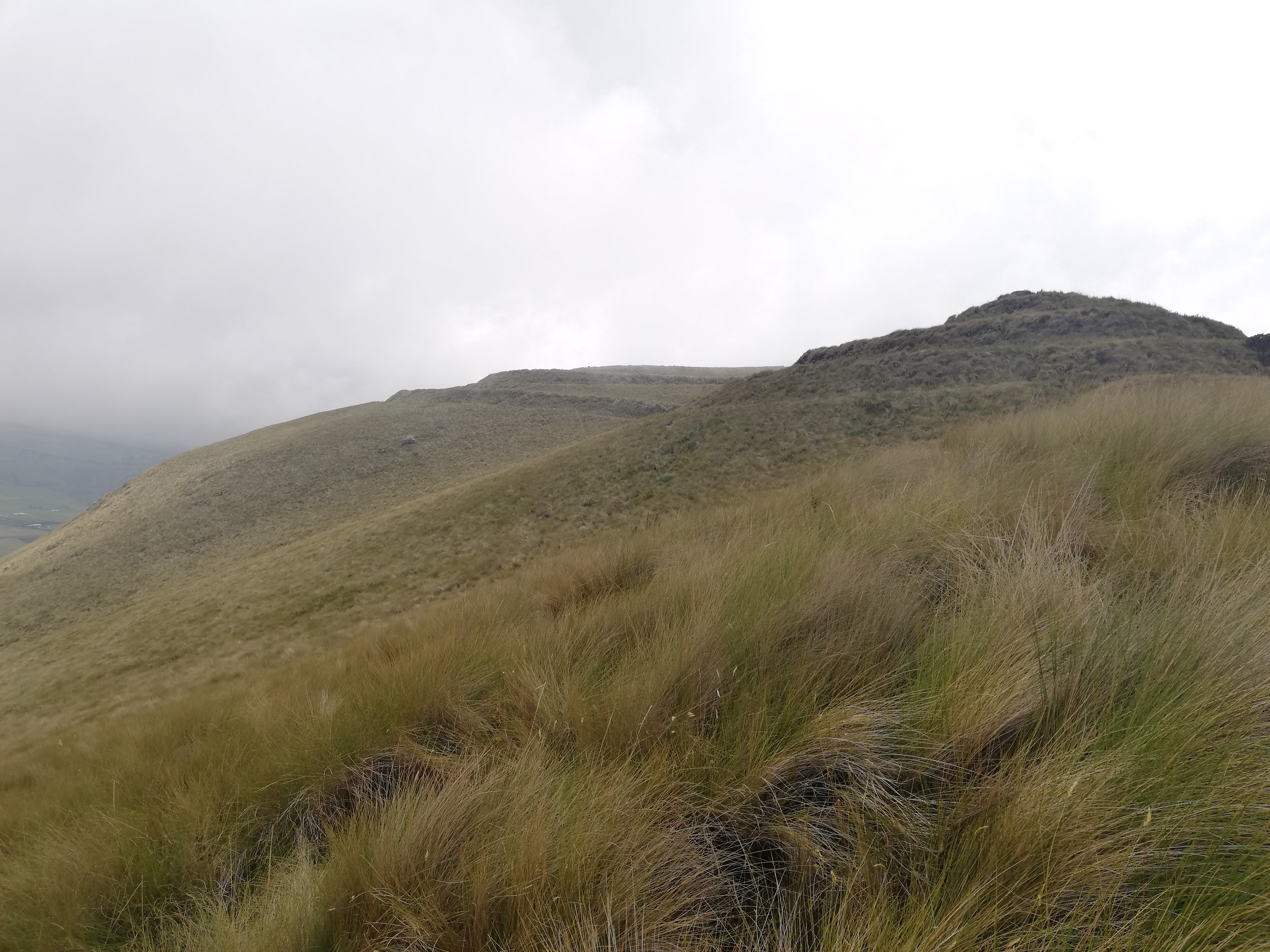
- Quitoloma fortress.

- Location within Ecuador
- 00°03′56″N 78°13′14″W
- Type: Fort and Settlement
- Location: Ecuador

History
- Built: c. 1490s CE

Site notes
- Condition: In ruins

The Pambamarca Fortress Complex consists of the ruins of a large number of pukaras (hilltop forts) and other constructions of the Inca Empire. The fortresses were constructed in the late 15th century by the Incas to overcome the opposition of the people of the Cayambe chiefdom to the expansion of the Incas in the Andes highlands of present-day northern Ecuador. The Pambamarca fortresses are located in Cayambe Canton in Pichincha Province about 32 kilometres (20 mi) in a straight-line distance northeast of the city of Quito.

In 1998, Pambamarca was placed on the tentative List of UNESCO World Heritage Sites.

== The opponents ==
=== The Pais Caranqui ===
In the 15th century, the people of the Andes highlands of Ecuador north of Quito were organized into several chiefdoms, apparently similar in language and culture but competitive with each other and frequently engaged in internecine warfare. The names of the most prominent chiefdoms were the Caranqui, Cayambe, Otavalo, and Cochasquí. Pais Caranqui (Caranqui country) is the collective name often used to describe the chiefdoms, although the Caranqui may not have been the most powerful of them. The Cayambe were the primary defenders who faced the advance of the Incas at the Pambamarca Fortresses. Scholars estimate the collective pre-Inca population of the chiefdoms was between 100,000 and 150,000.

There is considerable confusion among scholars as to the pre-Columbian Andean people of northern Ecuador. The Caranqui and other nearby people are often identified as the Cara people and with Cara culture and as descendants of the semi-mythical Quitu culture, from whence comes the name of the Ecuadorian capital of Quito.

=== The Inca ===
In the 1460s, as a military leader, the future emperor Topa Inca Yupanqui (ruled c. 1471–1493) may have begun the Inca conquest of Ecuador. He encountered stiff resistance from the Cañari but advanced as far as Quito during his reign. His son Huayna Capac (ruled 1493–1525) would spend nearly all his reign completing the conquest of northern Ecuador of which the first major barrier to the Incas was probably the Cayambe defense at Pambamarca.

The battles at Pambamarca apparently extended over several years terminating in an Inca victory, possibly around 1505. The Incas then went on to complete the conquest of northern Ecuador, achieving a final victory over the Caranqui at Yawarkucha (Blood Lake), which may have occurred as late as 1520. In the 1530s the Incas were in turn conquered by the Spanish. The intensity of the struggle is illustrated by the fact that 106 of 184 known Inca pukaras are in northern Ecuador, a relatively small area in an empire that stretched 4,000 kilometres (2,500 miles) north to south.

== The archaeological site ==
The Pambamarca Fortress Complex consists of 14 Inca pukaras and related structures, scattered over an arc 8 kilometres (5.0 miles) long on the northern slopes of the Pambamarca Volcano. The pukaras are located at elevations of 3,300 metres (10,800 ft) to 3,780 metres (12,400 ft). Approximately 4 kilometres (2.5 mi) northeast of the Inca pukaras is the defensive perimeter of the Cayambe, consisting of two pukaras which protected the cultivated valley of the Pisque River and the Cayambe capital, still called Cayambe. Between the two sets of fortresses is one pukara of uncertain origin.

The best known and one of the largest fortresses is Quitoloma (hill of Quito). It is the southernmost of the Pambamarca fortresses, located at an elevation of 3,780 metres (12,400 ft) atop a small hill. It measures about 700 metres (2,300 ft) long by 400 metres (1,300 ft) wide. The highest level of the site consists of an ushnu, a terraced platform used for religious ceremonies. The ushnu is surrounded by the remains of more than 100 buildings which served as living quarters, storehouses (qollqas), and administrative buildings. The inhabited area was surrounded by three concentric walls, each about 3 metres (9.8 ft) high and accessible through gates defended by towers, ditches, and other defensive works. Quitoloma was probably an administrative center and had the dual purpose of persecuting the war against the Pais Caranqui and defending the city of Quito and the sacred site of El Quinche. Archaeologists have found weaponry and large caches of stones used by the Incas's principal long-range weapons of slings and bolas scattered along the inside faces of the walls. An Inca road ran from Quito by Quitoloma and continued eastward toward the lowlands of the Amazon basin.
