= Caranqui culture =

Pre-Columbian culture

Caranqui culture Caranquis Kara
- c. 1000–c. 1470
- Pichincha province in Ecuador, where the Caranqui culture was based
- Capital: Inca-Caranqui
- Common languages: Caranqui language
- Historical era: Integration
  - Established: c. 1000
  - Disestablished: c. 1470
| Preceded by | Succeeded by |
| Cotocollao culture | Inca Empire |

The Caranqui culture or Cara was an archaeological culture which flourished in coastal Ecuador, in what is now Manabí Province, in the first millennium CE.

== History ==
In the 10th century AD, they followed the Esmeraldas River up to the high Andean valley of Caranqui. They were often at war with the neighboring Cayambi people.

The Caranqui and their allies were defeated in battle along with the Quitu, the Cañari, the Palta, and the other ethnic groups of the region by an army of Túpac Inca, the son of Pachacuti. They led a revolt against Huayna Capac along with the Cayambi. After the capture of their capital, they fled to a lake. The battle that followed was so brutal that the lake was renamed Yahuarcocha (blood lake). Huayna Cápac temporarily consolidated the region.

In 1534 the Caranqui culture were conquered by the Spanish. They became extinct as a tribe chiefly from exposure to new European infectious diseases, which took a heavy toll in fatalities. In addition, the Spanish conquerors married Cara women. Their descendants continued to intermarry, producing the mestizo population of the region who gradually became disconnected from their indigenous heritage.

In the early 21st century, there was a major find of sophisticated tombs, dating to 800 CE, in the Florida neighborhood of Quito. They are 20 meters deep, and each holds the remains of a total of 10 individuals in three levels, accompanied by grave goods of textiles, carved pieces, and food and drink for the afterlife. The Museum of Florida opened in 2010 in the neighborhood to hold artifacts and interpretive material related to Quitu culture, including figures of a man and a woman dressed in traditional Quitu clothing. This however does not indicate a united political entity in the region and the site is considered a Quitu site. The local ceramics do not show unity among the different regions supposedly ruled by the shyris.

== Kingdom of Quito ==
According to the Ecuadorian priest Juan de Velasco, they defeated the Quitu or Quilloces tribe, located in the valley of Quito, and set up a kingdom. The combined Quitu-Cara culture which was, according to de Velasco, known as the Shyris or Scyris civilization, would have thrived from 800 CE to the 1470s. De Velasco used as his source a lost work by Marcos de Niza, the existence of which has not been confirmed. According to the priest, more than four centuries under the kings, called shyris, of the Cara, the Kingdom of Quito dominated much of the highlands of modern Ecuador.

Several historians such as Jacinto Jijón y Caamaño, Alfredo Pareja Diezcanseco, María Rostworowski, Raúl Porras Barrenechea, and Federico González Suárez have questioned the existence of such a Kingdom and suggested that it was a legendary pre-Hispanic account. No archeological evidence of the kingdom of Quito has been found.

== Legacy ==
The Caranqui language is preserved in place names, such as the city of Carán, and the martial term Shyri, still in use in the Ecuadorean Army.
