= El Quinche =

- Rural parish
- Location within Ecuador
- Coordinates: 0°6′36.08″S 78°17′46.28″W
- Country: Ecuador
- Province: Pichincha
- Canton: Quito
- Elevation: 2,619 m (8,593 ft)

Population (2001)
  - Total: 12,870
- Time zone: UTC-5 (ECT)
- Climate: Cwb

El Quinche is a city of Ecuador, in the Pichincha Province, about 22 km (14 mi) in a straight line distance northeast of the city of Quito. The city, administratively a rural parish of the canton of Quito, is located in the valley of the headwaters of the Guayllabamba River, to the west of Pambamarca. It borders Cayambe Canton to the northeast.

== Marian shrine ==
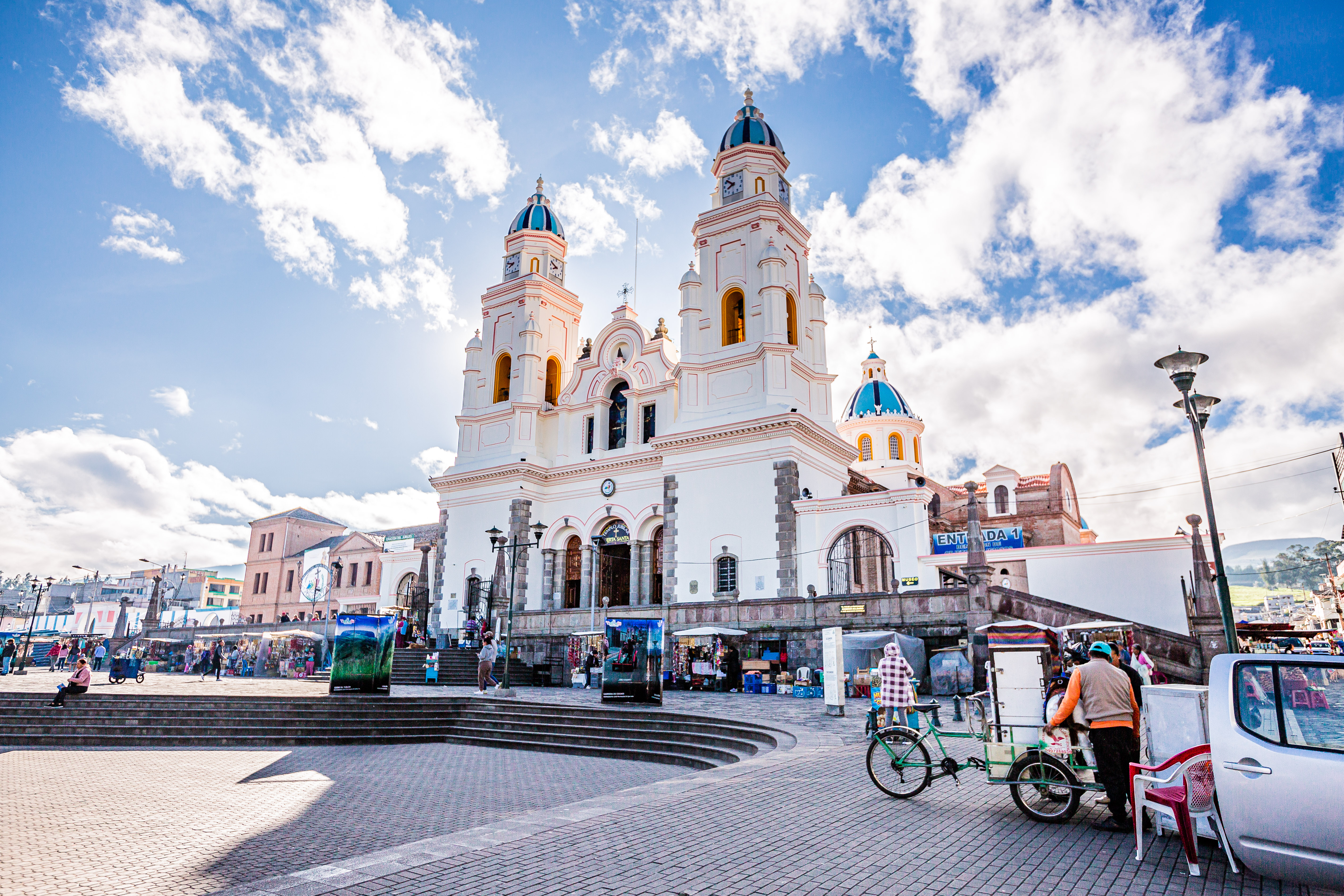
The Shrine of El Quinche.

The city is known for the National Shrine of Our Lady of the Presentation of El Quinche. A 16th century wooden image of the Virgin Mary attracts more than 800,000 people on a pilgrimage to the shrine in November.

Pope Francis visited El Quinche on July 8, 2015, and spoke to Catholic clergy.

== Pre-Columbian history ==
El Quinche is situated on a plain at the foot of the eastern cordillera of the Andes. It was apparently a religious shrine of the indigenous people living in the region long before the arrival of Europeans. The Incas conquered the area and incorporated it into their empire in the late 15th century. Following a common Inca policy, much of the local population was forcibly relocated to a distant province and replaced by colonies of non-locals, a process called mitma. El Quinche is one of the few places in Ecuador where a large amount of Inca pottery has been found, indicating its prominence as an Inca center.

The Incas built a temple over the indigenous huaca (shrine), and in turn the Spanish after conquering the area in the 1530s built a church over the Inca temple which became the shrine of El Quinche.

El Quinche was the southernmost settlement of what was called the Pais Caranqui, a group of northern Ecuadorian chiefdoms, which opposed the expansion of the Incas into their homelands. After conquering El Quinche, the Incas constructed a number of hilltop forts (pukaras) called the Pambamarca Fortress Complex 10 kilometres (6.2 mi) north west of El Quinche to prosecute the war against the Cayambe people and other chiefdoms and also to protect El Quinche. An Inca road stretched from Quito to El Quinche and onward to Pambamarca and toward the lowland tropics of Ecuador.

== Gallery of images of the sanctuary of the Lady of Quinche ==
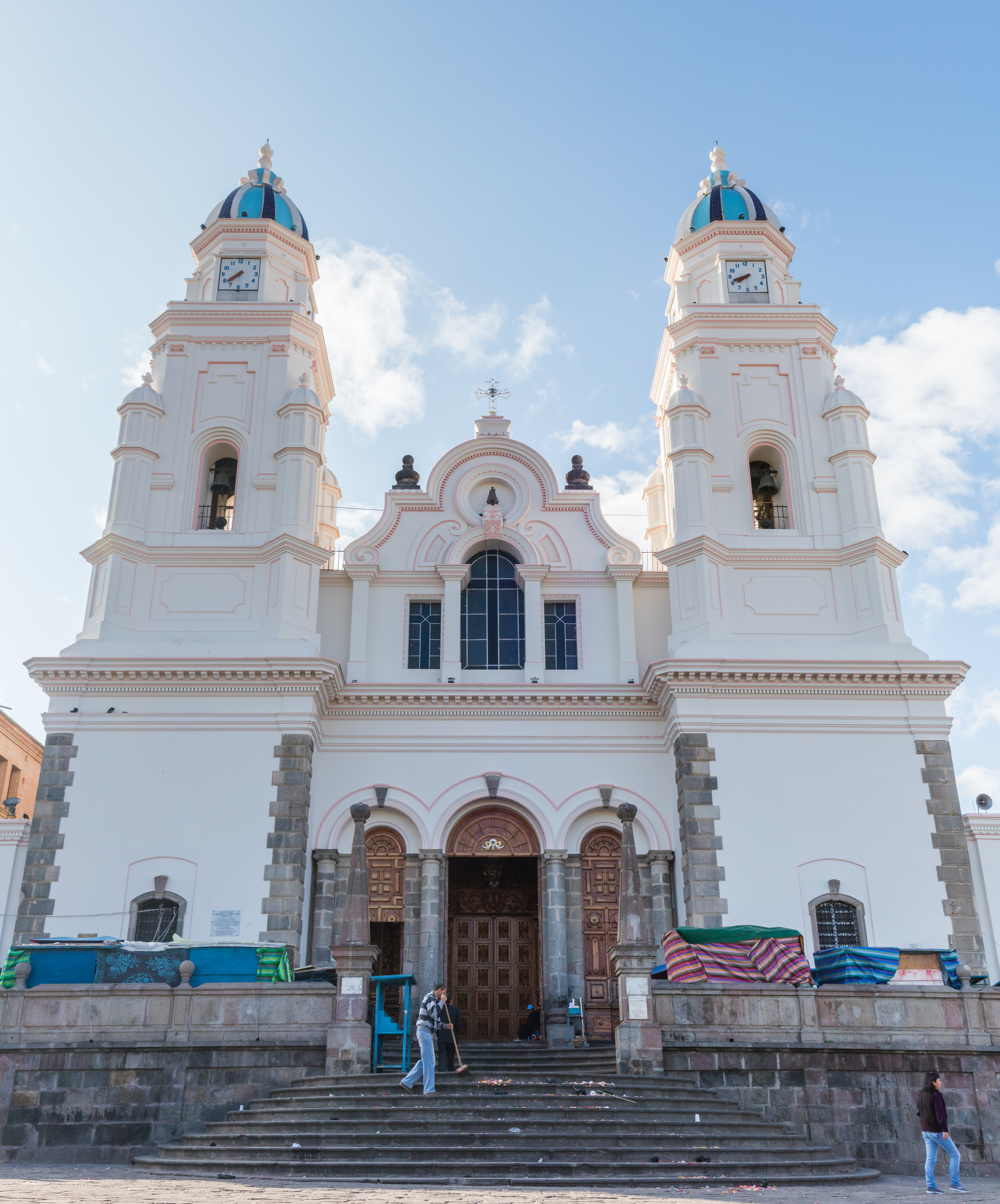

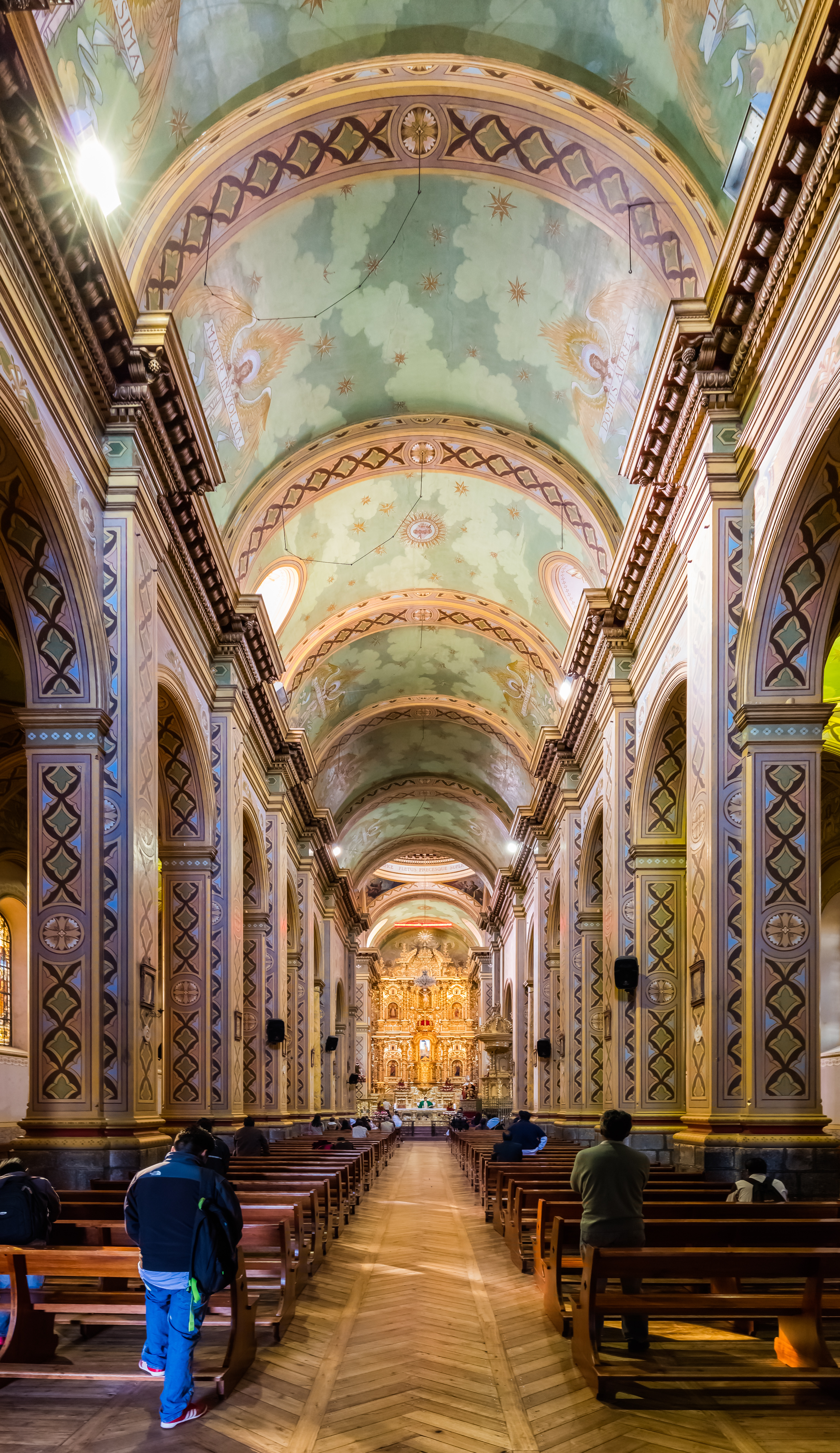

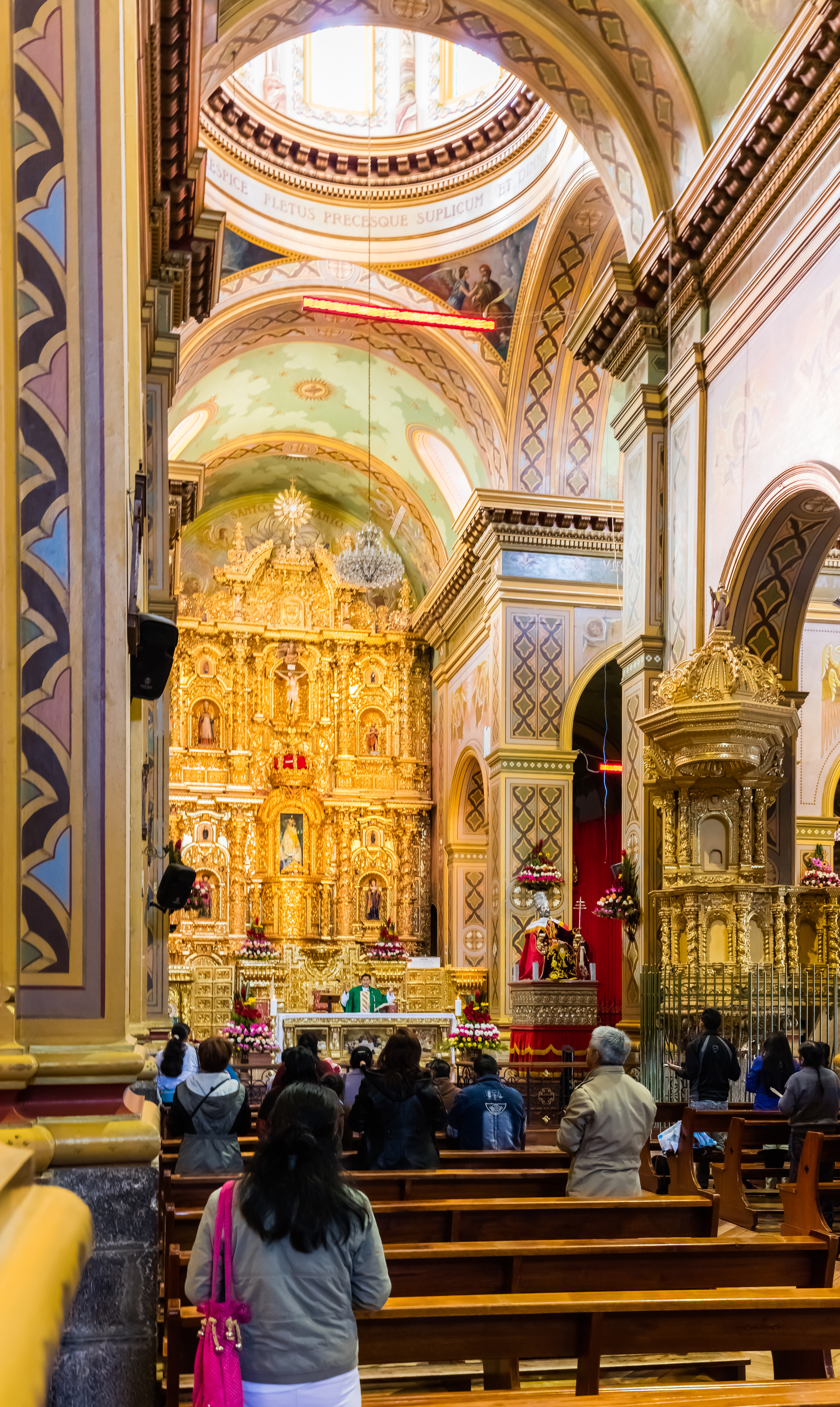

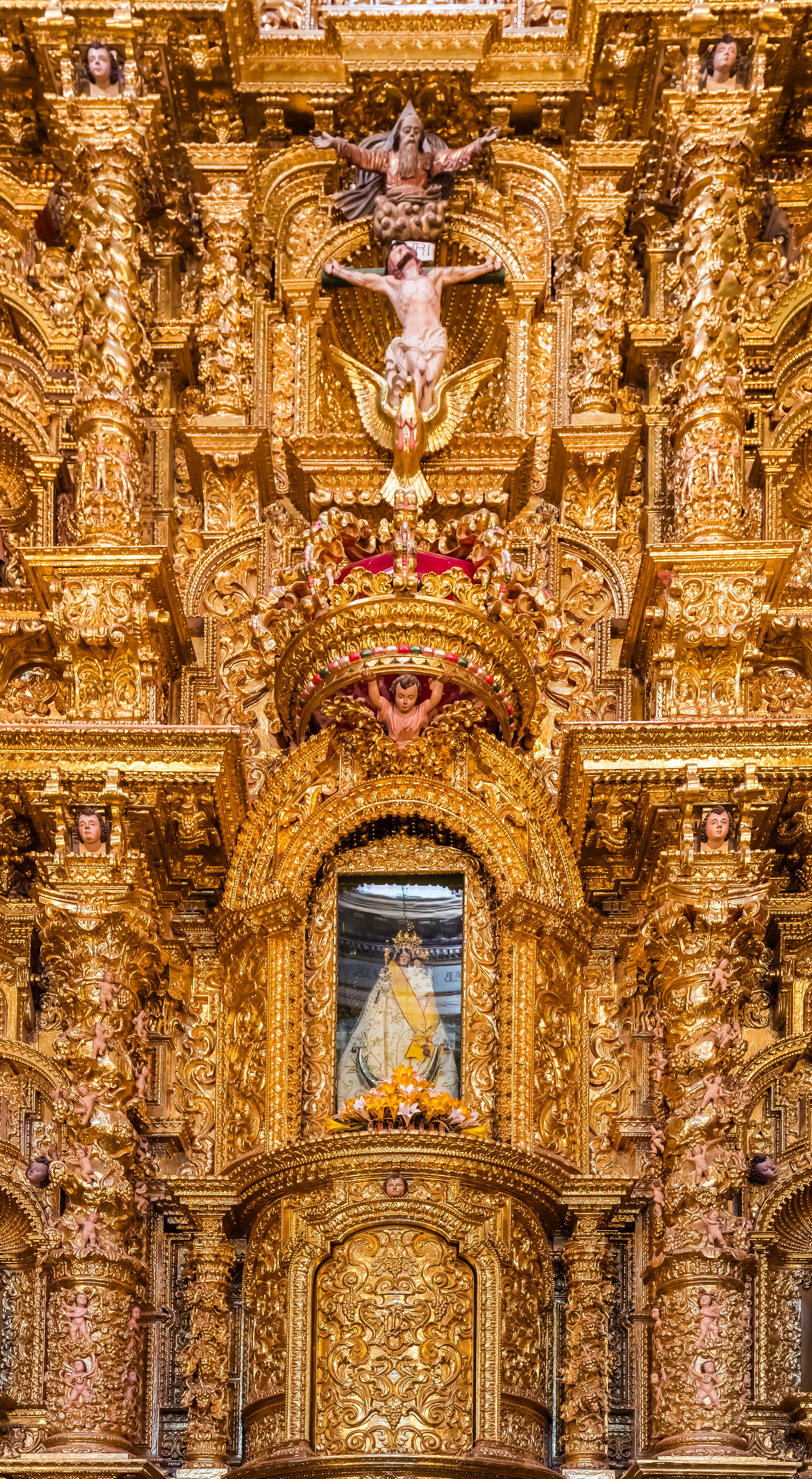

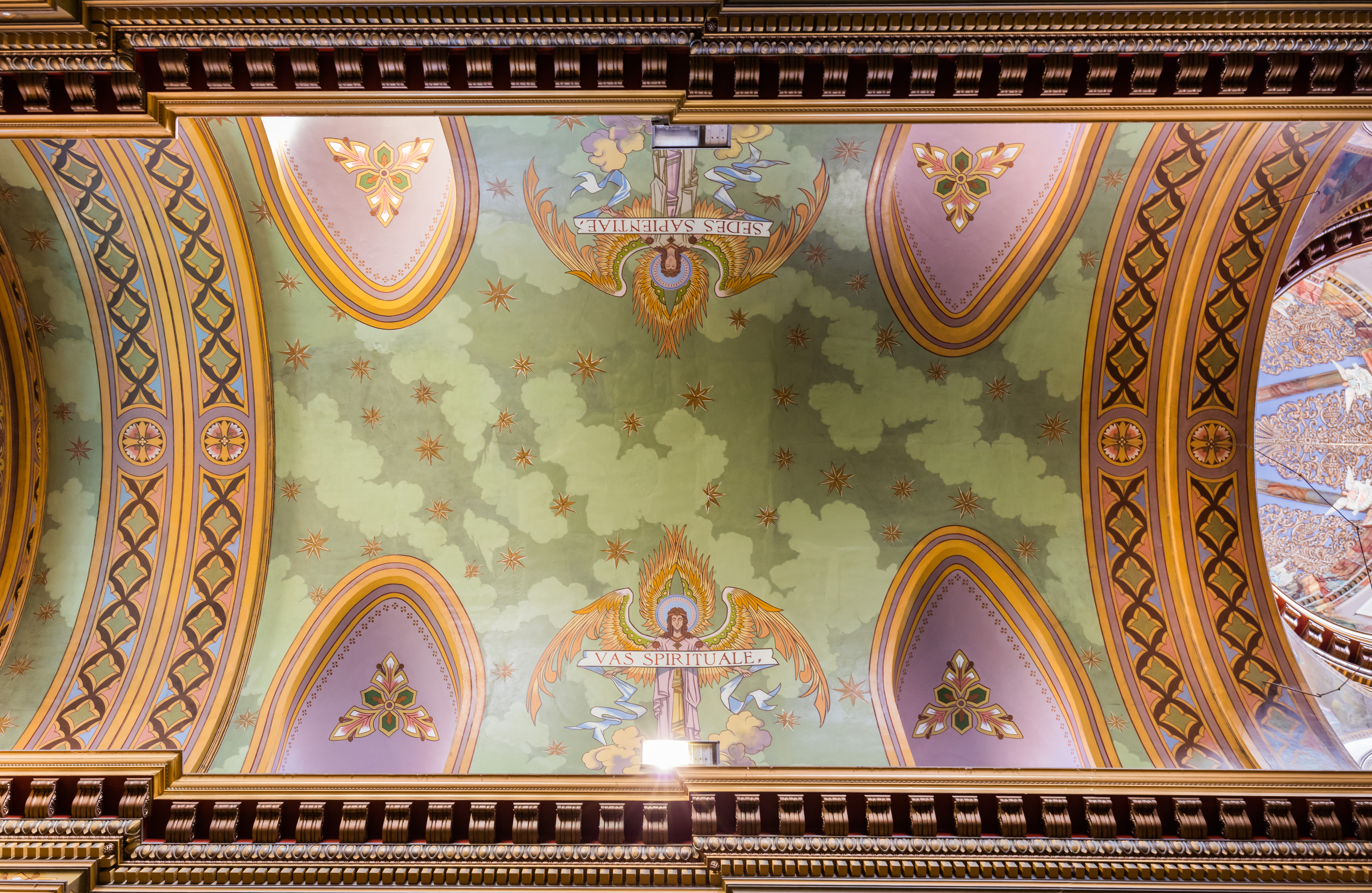
