= Cotocollao =

Cotocollao may refer to:

1. Cotocollao (Parish), a parish of northwestern Quito
2. Cotocollao Indians, a group of Indians named after the Cotocollao zone
