= Camata =

Camata may refer to:

- Camata River, a river in Bolivia
- the unripe acorns of the valonia oak
