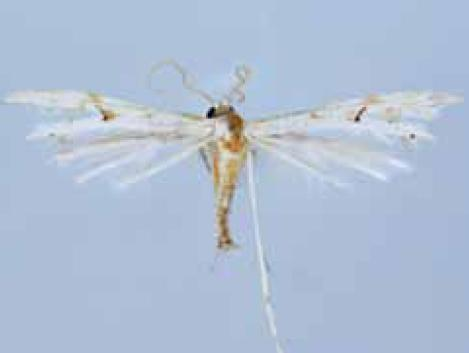

Scientific classification
- Kingdom: Animalia
- Phylum: Arthropoda
- Class: Insecta
- Order: Lepidoptera
- Family: Pterophoridae
- Genus: Hellinsia
- Species: H. paccha

Binomial name
- Hellinsia paccha Gielis, 2011

= Hellinsia paccha =

Species of plume moth

Hellinsia paccha is a moth of the family Pterophoridae. It is found in Ecuador.

The wingspan is 14–16 mm. Adults are on wing in September.

== Etymology ==
The name refers to Paccha, an Inca princess.
