= Paccha Duchicela =

Inca queen who co-reigned with Huayna Capac (r. 1487–1525)

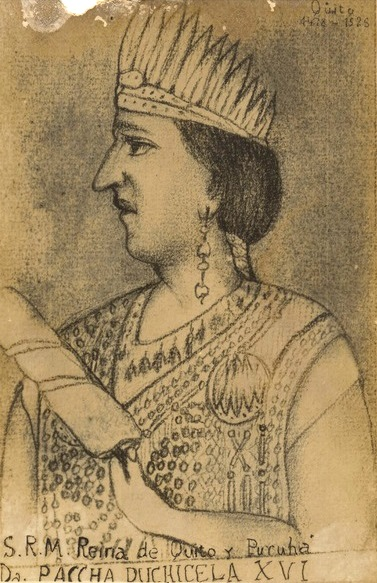
Paccha Duchicela

Paccha Duchicela (1485–1525), was, according to the priest Juan de Velasco, a queen regnant of Quito in 1487–1525 and co-reigned with her husband Huayna Capac, the Emperor of Inca Empire. As all the kings and queens of Quito, she is only mentioned by de Velasco. She was also a consort of the Inca Empire by marriage to the Sapa Inca Huayna Capac (r 1493–1527). She has been pointed out as the mother of Atahualpa.

Paccha Duchicela was the daughter of the Puruhá chief Cacha Duchicela of Quito in Ecuador. She was the heir of her father's throne, and when Quito became a vassal of the Inca Empire, she was married to the Inca emperor. Her right to the throne of Quito was thereby transferred to the royal Inca dynasty. She is reported to have had four children by the Inca; that she was the mother of Atahualpa is not confirmed. The existence of the kingdom of Quito and therefore her existence is not confirmed either and has been questioned by several historians due to a lack of archeological data.

== Sources ==
- Avilés Pino, Efrén. «Paccha Duchicela, Shyri XVI». Enciclopedia del Ecuador.
