= Quitu culture =

Pre-columbian Native Ecuadorians

Quitu
- Map showing the extent of the Quitu culture
- Geographical range: Pichincha
- Period: Regional Development
- Dates: c. 500 BCE - 1470 CE
- Preceded by: Cotocollao culture
- Followed by: Kingdom of Quito (according to de Velasco); Inca Empire

The Quitu or Quillaco were pre-Columbian indigenous peoples in Ecuador who founded Quito, which is the capital of present-day Ecuador. This people ruled the territory from 2000 BCE and persisted through the period known as the Regional Integration Period. They were overtaken by the invasion of the Inca. The Spanish invaded and conquered the center in 1534.

The Quitu occupied an area dominated by mountains, settling largely in the valleys. About 800 CE, they created three-level, 20-meter deep tombs as part of funerary centers on the plateau. The bodies were accompanied by highly refined grave goods of textiles, shells and metals, as well as drink and food for the afterlife. These tombs were discovered in the Florida neighborhood of Quito, and in 2010 the Museum of Florida opened to display many of their treasures.

== History ==
The Quitu lived in an area surrounded by mountains, especially the massif formed by the Guagua and Ruco Pichincha volcanoes. The mountains were sacred to them. They established their burial or funeral centers on the plateau, and had most of their villages in the valleys. When they occupied this area, they used the Iñaquito lagoon. (In the 20th century, this was filled in and developed for an airport serving Quito.)

Around 1470 they were conquered by Topa Inca Yupanqui, who at the time was a general of his father Pachacuti. Later, under the reign of Huayna Capac, they revolted alongside the Cayambis, the Caranquis, the Pastos and the other ethnic groups of the far north. However the revolt was put down by the Inca.

In the early 21st century a large Quitu funerary and ceremonial area was excavated in Quito. Archeologist Holguer Jara said this delay protected their artifacts for centuries from grave robbers, who are known to have depleted many other cultures of their valuable archeological remains, especially artifacts made of gold.

The Quitu are believed to have endured as a people during a period regional states, known as the late intermediate, long before the Inca conquered the territory or the Spanish explorers arrived in the early 16th century to conquer the city.

The Quitu traded with the Yumbo, a tribe that lived northwest of this area. The Yumbo had networks that reached from the Andes west to the coast. The Quitu grave goods showed that they had acquired valuable Spondylus shells. These were harvested by the Manta people in what are now the coastal provinces of Manabí and Santa Elena. The shells were highly valued by Native Americans and exported throughout the trading networks of South America, as they have been found in Argentina, Chile, Peru, Colombia and even present-day Mexico. Based on their use of these shells associated with religious rituals, the Quitu were among the many peoples who gave them sacred meaning.

The people made art and used wooden instruments for their music.

In 2010, an area of numerous 20-meter deep, three-level Quitu tombs was discovered in Quito, dating to about 800CE. The tombs had three levels, with multiple burials on each level: four bodies on the lowest, and six on each of the next two levels. Both men and women were buried in a squatting position, wrapped in cloth and with decorated ponchos, some featuring refined, carved Spondylus shells, which were acquired by Quitu trade from the Manta culture along the Pacific coast.

The Museum of Florida has been developed here to display and interpret artifacts from the tombs. It is named after the neighborhood in which the tombs were found. The museum includes constructed figures of a Quitu man and woman (the latter's face was created by forensic techniques from a skull excavated at the site.) The woman wears clothing as found in the tombs: "a poncho covered with small buttons carved from Spondylus shell and snails, as well as silverware such as earrings, pins, necklaces, hunting darts and rattles". The Quitu were a festive people, and rattles were a way for women to make music as they walked.

== Organization ==
Excavations of tombs show the Quitu believed in an afterlife. Grave goods, including drink and food, were buried with them for their use in the afterlife. Essentially the Quitu were an agricultural people, seen as a "pueblo alegre y festivo" (happy and festive people).

They are not known for any association with the Peruvian town of Iquitos, east of the mountains and in the Amazonian basin.

== Kingdom of Quito ==
In the 21st century archeological evidence had been found associated with this people. This however does not confirm the existence of the semi-legendary kingdom of Quito and is only archeological evidence for an independent Quitu culture with no united political entity in the region. According to the Spanish Jesuit missionary and historian Juan de Velasco, in his book, Historia del Reino de Quito en la América meridional (1789), the Quitu were conquered by said kingdom of Quito around 980 CE. He also referred to this people as Scyris, and said they may have been related to the Inca. He cited three lost documents as his sources, the existence of which has not been confirmed: "Las dos líneas de los Incas y de los Scyris, señores del Cuzco, y del Quito," by Fray Marcos de Niza, a Franciscan who accompanied Sebastián Benalcázar's conquest of Quito in 1533; "Las antigüedades del Perú," by Melchor Bravo de Saravia, an oidor (judge) of Lima; and "Guerras civiles del Inca Atahualpa con su hermano Atoco, llamado comúnmente Huáscar-Inca," by Jacinto Collahuaso, an eighteenth-century cacique of Ibarra (north of Quito).

Several historians such as Jacinto Jijón y Caamaño and Alfredo Pareja Diezcanseco contest that the Scyris existed and that they were related to the Inca. To some the kingdom of Quito is a legendary, pre-Hispanic kingdom to which people could refer for dreams of former glory. There is no archeological evidence indicating any kind of cultural and political unity, the sites found rather hinting at regional states.

== See also ==
- Cara culture
- Pre-Columbian Ecuador
