= Pambamarca =

- Location within Ecuador

Highest point
- Elevation: 4,062 m (13,327 ft)
- Coordinates: 0°04′47″S 78°12′31″W

Geography
- Location: AndesEcuador
- Parent range: Pambamarca Group

Geology
- Rock age: Pleistocene
- Mountain type: Stratovolcano

Pambamarca or Pimbamarca is an eroded stratovolcano in the Central Cordillera of the northern Ecuadorian Andes in Pichincha Province. it is 25 miles (40 km) northeast of Quito. The summit is at an elevation of 4,062 metres (13,327 ft).

The mountains of the Pambamarca in the Andean Highlands of Ecuador has many Pre-Columbian fortresses that predate the arrival of the Spanish in the region; Pambamarca has the greatest concentration of these forts. The Pambamarca Fortress Complex has been studied with participation by many international organizations, universities, and the Government of Ecuador with the objective of exploring the cultural landscapes, its prehistoric, historic and contemporary cultures, particularly of Ecuador's important Pre-Columbian cultural heritage. In 1998, Pambamarca was placed on the tentative List of UNESCO World Heritage Sites.

== History ==
The fortifications originated with the Inca Empire who conquered Ecuador easily, and established themselves at Quito. Noting that the local indigenous community settled in Pambamarca were docile, the Incas thought that they could move in and occupy the territories outside Quito. But they faced serious resistance, and the war lasted 17 years before the Incas could finally conquer the Ecuadorians in the 1500s, with the fall of the fortresses. Following this, the Incas built many fortresses and lived in them. Among the provinces to the north of Quito the pre-Hispanic fortresses are concentrated in the mountain range of Pambamarca.

Inferred from the Cayambe pottery in use in the region, archaeologist examining the area are of the opinion that Cayambe culture has prevailed "as some peoples decided after many years of resistance and warfare to simply lay down their arms or become allies with the Inca."

After Spanish people invaded Ecuador and Peru, not only smallpox took a big toll on the local population of Inca but due to the superior gunpowder power of the invaders their last stronghold at Vilcabamba also fell in 1572.

After the Spanish conquest of Ecuador the Spaniards built estates known as haciendas. The Cayambe were subjected to forced labour in these estates, working on wool processing and living in primitive homes.

== Legend ==
According to a legend that relates to the period, Huayna Capac, ruler of the Incas with an ambitious plan of winning the Cayambe got muddled in a 17 years' war even though they invaded with a large army. The Cayambes noted the large army of invaders had retreated to a large and strong fortress. When the Incas laid siege on the fort, the Cayambes’ were not cowed but gave a brave fight which eventually forced the Incas to lift the siege as they had lost many men in the fight.

However, the Incas finally defeated the Cayambes and forced them to retreat to the shores of the lake Yawarkucha. It is also said that the Incas cut the throats of their enemies and threw them into the lake, which turned red with blood, and thus the lake got the epithet "Yawarkucha" meaning "blood lake". This aspect of the legend is to be confirmed by further explorations by archeologists examining the areas.

== Geography ==
Jorge Juan y Santacilia and Louis Godin, on their voyage through South America to fix signals for surveys, arrived at the "desert of Pambamarca" in early September 1737. A mountain of medium height in this desert is also named Pambarmarca. One of the largest group of fortresses (on the hill which is called locally as pukaras) seen in Ecuador was the Pambamarca Group located along a ridge running in a north–south direction. These military structures provided security to Quito fortress and other forts such as Jambimachi, Pambamarca, Pachha, Campana, Olachan Tablarumi, Achupallas, Guachala and Bravo.

== Ulloa's halo ==
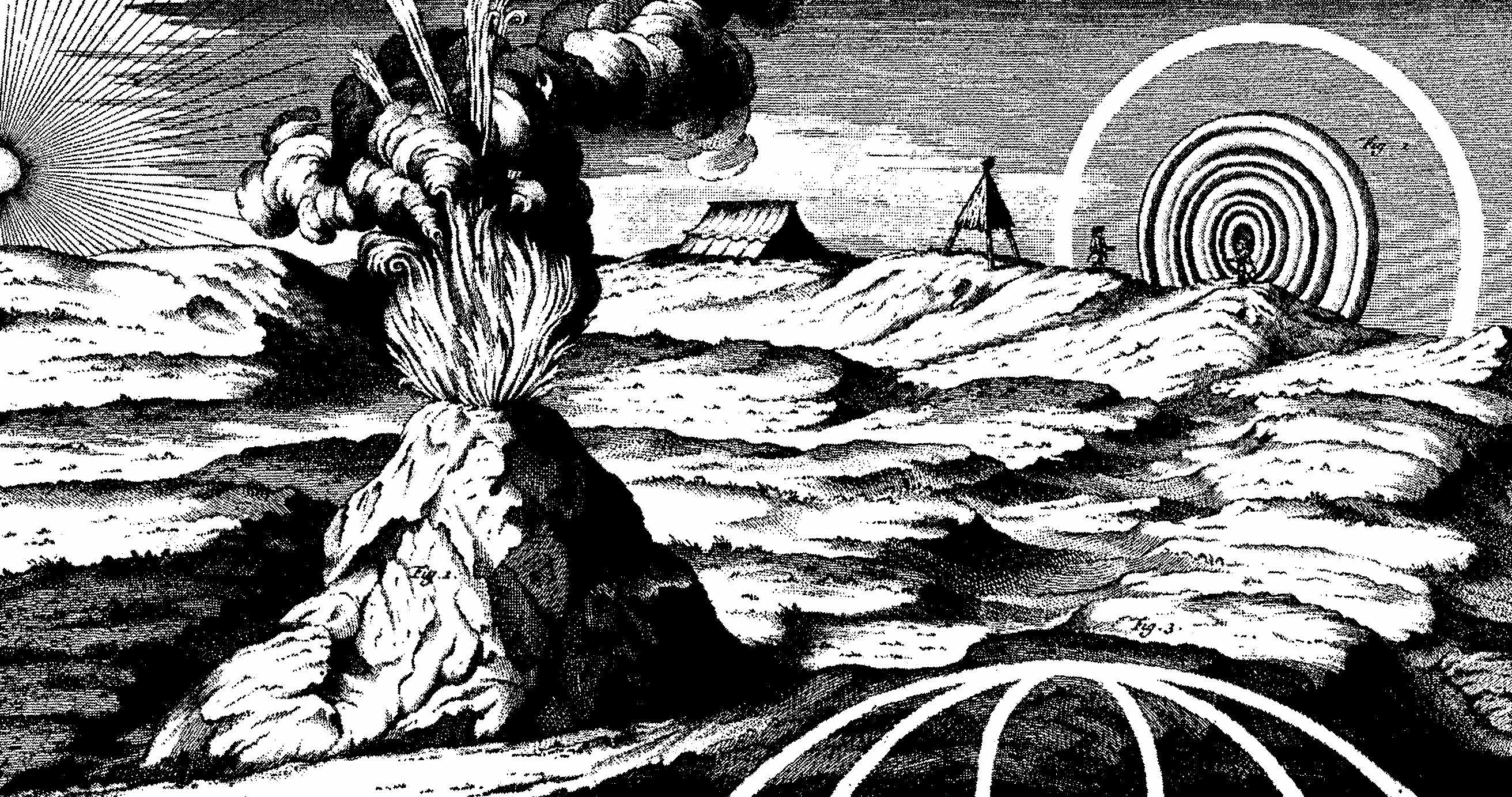
Illustration from Jorge Juan's and Antonio de Ulloa's, Voyage to South America (1748), depicting three separate scenes: (1) on the left, an erupting volcano; (2) on the upper right, optical glories surrounded by a fog bow; and (3) on the lower right, arcs of white light near a mountaintop

Antonio de Ulloa and another member of the French Geodesic Mission to the Equator, Pierre Bouguer, reported that while walking near the summit of the Pambamarca mountain they saw their shadows projected on a lower-lying cloud, with a circular "halo or glory" around the shadow of the observer's head. Ulloa noted that

The most surprising thing was that, of the six or seven people that were present, each one saw the phenomenon only around the shadow of his own head, and saw nothing around other people’s heads.

This has been called "Ulloa's halo" or "Bouguer's halo". It is similar to the phenomenon that later came be known as the "Brocken spectre" after the Brocken, the highest peak in the Harz mountains in central Germany. Ulloa reported that the glories were surrounded by a larger ring of white light, which would today be called a fog bow. On other occasions, he observed arches of white light formed by reflected moonlight, whose explanation is unknown but which may have been related to ice-crystal halos.

== Culture ==
The Pambamarca Fortress Complex is a large installation of many Inca pucarás, located on the peaks and ridges of the extinct Pambamarca stratovolcano. During the current research by the Pambamarca Archaeological Project, the team uncovered pre-Inca fortresses at the base of Pambamarca. The existence of two types of forts and the recovery of many armaments is suggestive of a pre-Columbian borderland, which is an important and rare find in New World archaeology.

Another culture of special importance, which attracted the Incas to this region is that the mountains are located on the equatorial line. It is the unique feature not replicated anywhere else in the world and forms the dividing line for the culture. The mounds found here have been used by the local Indians as landmarks for solar and star position calculations.

== Archeological finds ==
The Incan Forts discovered in the Pambamarca extinct volcano region are 20, apart from two fortresses built by the Cayambe, the ethnic people of Ecuador. These fortresses have been identified as about 500 years old. According to the Director of the Archaeological Project these are inferred to represent border region between the fortresses built by the Ecuadorian people and the Inca. More fortresses are likely to be found in the entire northern region of Ecuador, which need further explorations.

The Inca forts located at about 10,000 feet (3,000 m) elevation on ridges were built with stones laid over plinths called ushnus. Archeologists have inferred that these forts were inhabited and people living in them were ready for fighting with stone slings kept ready for use.

The two Cayambe forts built with strong volcanic material known locally as cangahua are of large size which were inhabited. The forts were also well stocked with ammunition of two types-sling stones and bola stones.
