= Camata River =

Location
- Country: Bolivia

The Camata River is a river of Bolivia. The river itself is freshwater. It is home to many species.

== See also ==
- List of rivers of Bolivia
