= Miguel Cabello de Balboa =

- Born: c. 1535; Archidona, Málaga, Spain
- Died: 1608; Camata, Larecaja, Bolivia
- Occupations: Soldier, cleric, chronicler, writer
- Relatives: Vasco Núñez de Balboa

Ecclesiastical career
- Religion: Christian
- Church: Catholic: Order of Saint Augustine

Miguel Cabello de Balboa (c. 1535 – 1608) was a Spanish secular priest and writer.

== Early years ==
Miguel Cabello de Balboa was a great-nephew of Captain Vasco Núñez de Balboa, the first European to have led an expedition to encounter the Pacific Ocean from the New World in 1513. He was born at Archidona, Málaga, perhaps in either 1530 or 1535, though the exact date is unknown.

== Career ==
=== Military ===
Choosing a military career as a young man, he participated in the wars of France and the Netherlands, under the leadership of Prince Emmanuel Philibert, Duke of Savoy, and Lamoral, Count of Egmont, and directly with Rodrigo de Basan. He was amongst the victors of the Battle of Gravelines (1558) over the French armies of Marshal Paul de Thermes.

=== Ecclesiastical ===
On his return to Malaga in 1565 or 1566 he entered the Augustinian order and emigrated to Peru, South America, in 1566. From there he went to Quito, Ecuador, where he began to write the Miscelánea Antártica, finishing it in 1586 at Lima where he resided from 1596 to 1604. In Lima, he also composed a number of excellent works in verse and prose, among them, it seems, two comedies. In the years 1602–1603, he wrote a letter giving valuable details concerning the regions of Pelechuco and Apolobamba in eastern Bolivia, between the Andes and the Beni River. In this letter he does not explicitly state that he visited those districts, but the information imparted is such as to imply this. The letter is taken from a book written by Father Cabello of which nothing else is known. He is also an important source on the northern Andean region, especially the Pacific shore and the forested regions running inland up to the cordilleras of what are now northern Ecuador and southern Colombia. He died in 1608 at Camata, Larecaja Province, Bolivia.

An exemplary edition of the whole Miscelánea Antártica was published by San Marcos University, Peru, in 1951, supplanting previous partial editions. The original was (1853) in the possession of the historiographer Don Joaquin Garcia Ycazbalceta in Mexico. A complete copy also exists at the Lenox Branch of the New York Public Library. It contains alleged Amerindian traditional records of the coming to South America of white men who are said to have preached the gospels to the aborigines; also a theory that the Indians of Patagonia and Chile are the descendants of pirates of Macassar. The legendary history of the Inca civilization is expounded at length, and the origin of the Inca given in a manner somewhat at variance with the accounts of other Spanish authors. Writings about the lowland peoples are gathered in a 1945 Ecuadorian volume entitled Verdadera Descripción y Relación de la Provincia y Tierra de las Esmeraldas.

== Publications ==
- Cabello de Balboa, Miguel (1581). Verdadera Descripción y Relación de la Provincia y Tierra de las Esmeraldas.
- Cabello de Balboa, Miguel (1586). Miscelánea Antártica: Una Historia del Perú Antiguo. Lima: Universidad Nacional Mayor de San Marcos, Facultad de Letras, Instituto de Etnología (published 1951).
- La Volcánea (lost)
- El Militar Elogio (lost)
- La Entrada de los Mojos (lost)
- La Comedia del Cuzco (comedy, lost)
- La Vasquirana (comedy, lost)

== See also ==
- Barrenechea, Raul Porras (1986). Los Cronistas del Peru (1528-1650). Lima: BCP.
- Pimentel, Rodolfo Perez. Diccionario Biográfico del Ecuador. Quito.
- Tauro del Pino, Alberto (2001). Enciclopedia Ilustrada del Perú. Lima: PEISA.
