= Cotocollao culture =

Pre-Columbian Indigenous culture from South America

Cotocollao
- Location of the Cotocollao culture
- Geographical range: Pichincha
- Period: Formative
- Dates: c. 1,500 – 500 BCE
- Preceded by: Valdivia culture
- Followed by: Quitu culture

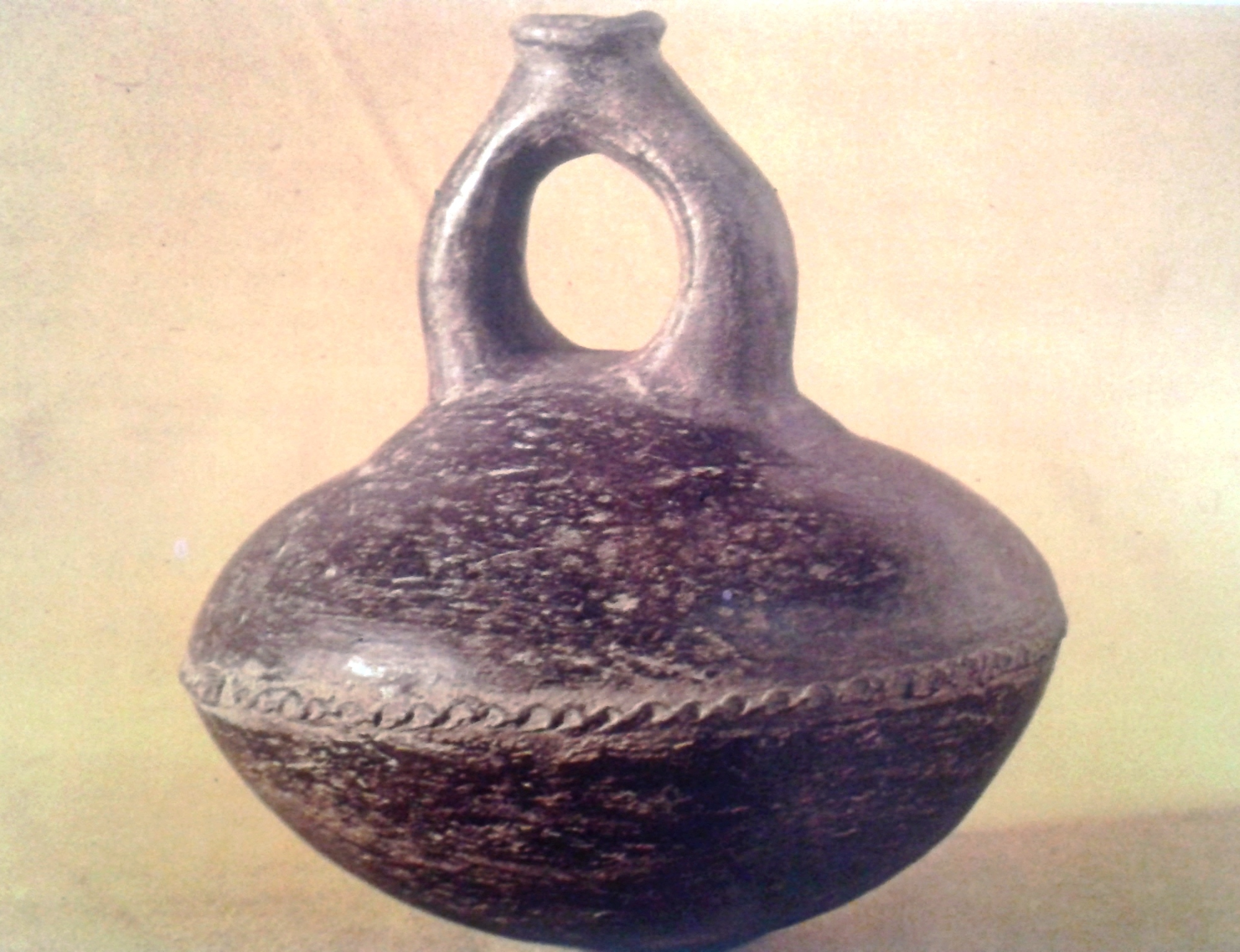
Cotocollao stirrup jug

The Cotocollao culture were an indigenous Pre-Columbian culture that inhabited the valley that is now the Quito area, in Ecuador.

== Introduction ==
The Cotocollao natives were the first inhabitants of the mountains of what is now Ecuador. They lived approximately 1,500 to 500 years BCE, in an era known as the Formative Period.

== Lifestyle ==
The Cotocollao lived on farming, cultivating corn, beans, quinoa, potatoes and Lupin beans. They also hunted deer, rabbit, guanta, puma, wolf, guinea pig and doves. They lived in small villages of rectangular huts of lath and mud with straw thatching. They wore clothing woven from cotton.

== Artwork ==
Probably the most distinguishing feature of the Cotocollao natives was their ability to create ceramic artwork. They made ceramics that were more for decoration than for their usefulness. It is not known whether or not they had a special place inside their houses to make ceramic artwork or not.

To make the ceramic, the Cotocollaos used a paste made of pumice powder. The surface of the ceramic is known for its distinctive red tint. So mastered were they at this artwork that some pieces of ceramic are even known to produce certain animal or bird sounds. The quality of the ceramics was superior to all others in that time period. From the thousands of fragments of ceramic found in the area today, about 20% of them are decorated in some form by incisions, red paint, and in some rare cases, an iridescent coating.

== Decline ==
The area was gradually abandoned following eruptions of the Pululahua volcano.
