= Yawarkucha =

Lake in Ecuador near the city of Ibarra

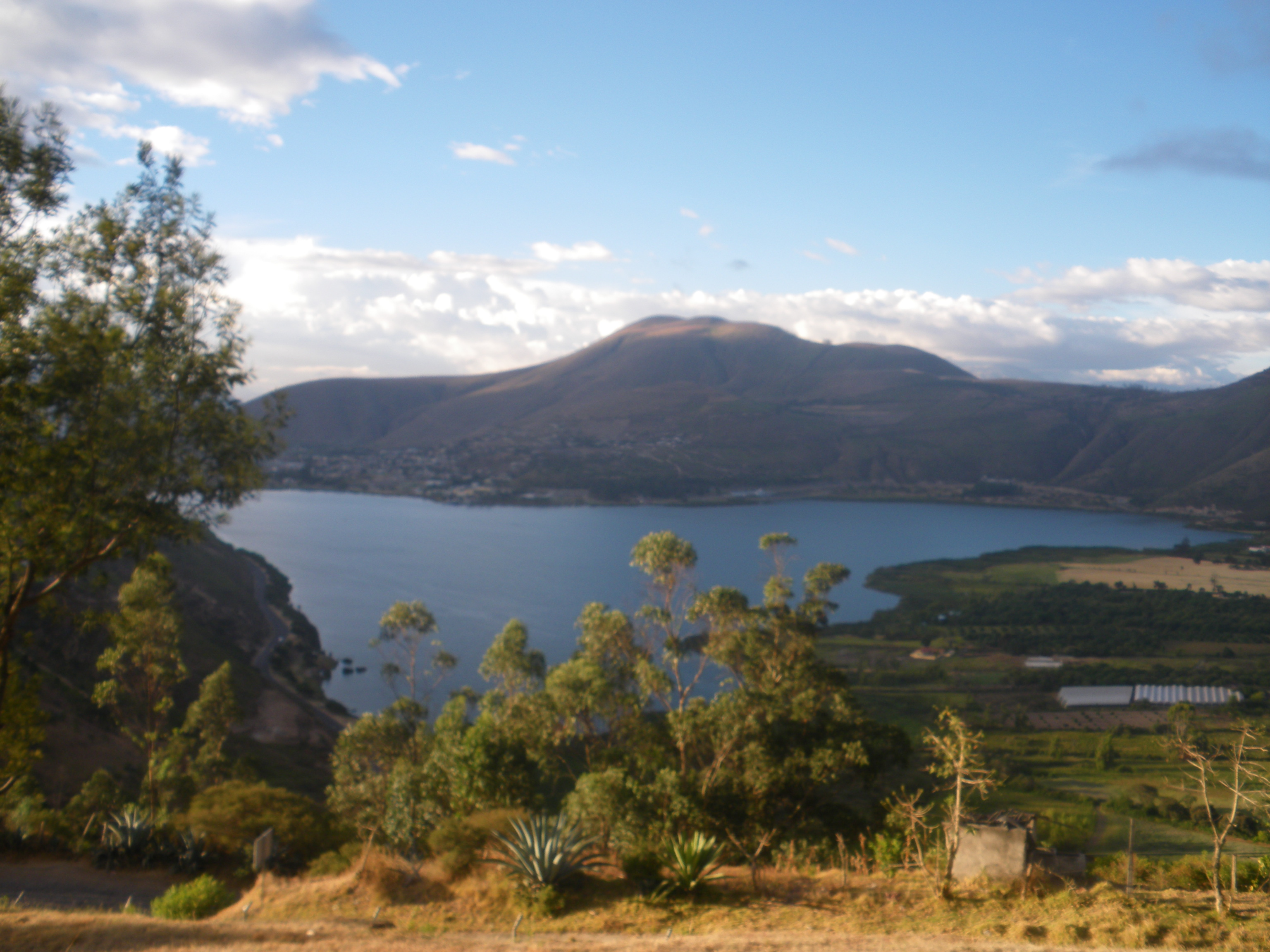
- Yawarkucha

- Location within Ecuador
- Location: Ecuador; Imbabura Province
- Coordinates: 0°22′N 78°06′W
- Surface area: 257 hectares (640 acres)
- Max. depth: 8 metres (26 ft)

Yawarkucha or Yawar Kucha (Kichwa yawar blood, kucha lake, "blood lake"), Hispanicized spellings Yaguarcocha, Yahuarcocha) is a lake in Ecuador located in the eastern outskirts of the city of Ibarra in Imbabura Province, Ibarra Canton. The lake is about 2 kilometres (1.2 mi) long and wide and has an elevation of 2,190 metres (7,190 ft) above sea level. The lake was formed from glacial meltwater about 10,000 BCE.

The scenic lake is a popular tourist attraction.

Yawarkucha acquired its name as a result of a battle and massacre which allegedly took place here during the conquest of the area by the Inca Empire in the late 15th or early 16th century. The local chiefdom called the Caranqui fiercely resisted the Inca invasion of their territory. The Inca Emperor, Huayna Capac (ruled c. 1493–1525) finally achieved victory near the present-day city of Ibarra. According to Spanish chronicler Miguel Cabello de Balboa, Huayna Capac ordered the massacre of the male population of Caranqui in retribution for its resistance. The massacre of thousands of men took place on the shores of a lake, known thereafter as Yawarkucha or "Blood Lake."

== See also ==
- Autodromo Internacional de Yahuarcocha
- Inca-Caranqui, archaeological site
