= Juan de Velasco =

Ecuadorian Jesuit priest, historian, and professor (1727–1792)

Juan de Velasco y Pérez Petroche
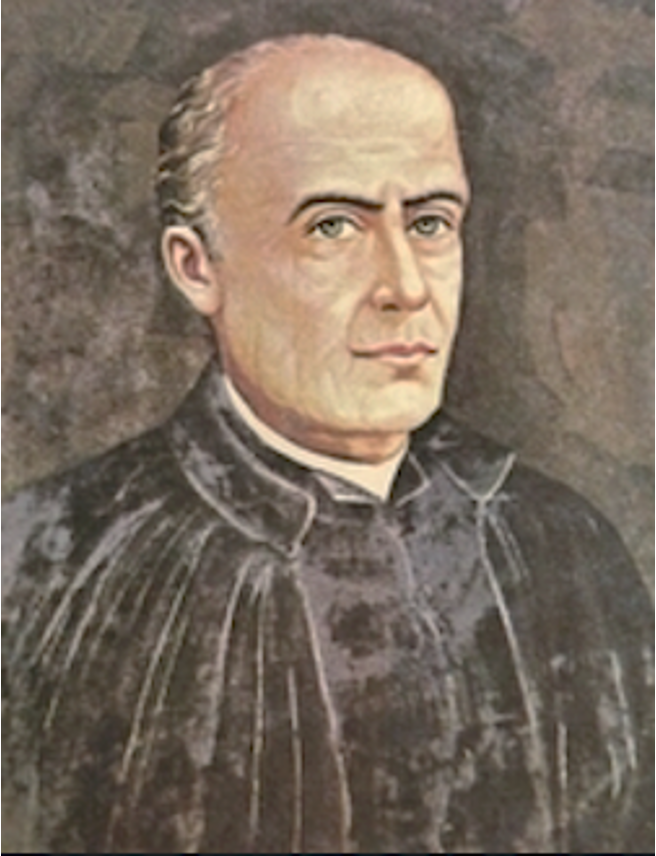

Personal life
- Born: January 27, 1727 Riobamba, Real Audiencia of Quito (in present day Ecuador)
- Died: June 29, 1792 (aged 65) Faenza, Papal States (in present day Italy)

Religious life
- Religion: Catholic

Juan de Velasco y Pérez Petroche (1727–1792) was an 18th-century Jesuit priest, historian, and professor of philosophy and theology from the Royal Audience of Quito. He was born in Riobamba to Juan de Velasco y López de Moncayo and to María Pérez Petroche. Among the universities where he taught was the Universidad de San Marcos in Lima in the Viceroyalty of Peru. He is best known for his history book Historia del Reino de Quito, although he also wrote books in fields other than history, such as physics textbooks and poetry anthologies.

The book Historia del Reino de Quito is important in the history of Ecuador and of the city of Quito because it alleges the existence of a pre-Inca kingdom in what is now Ecuador and which is known as Reino de Quito (Kingdom of Quito). The book is mentioned, discussed and criticized by several historians such as Marcos Jiménez de la Espada, Federico González Suárez, Jacinto Jijón y Caamaño, Alfredo Pareja Diezcanseco, Misael Acosta Solís, Enrique Ayala Mora and Galo Ramón Valarezo.

A picture of Juan de Velasco was in a 1947 60-cent postal stamp of the Ecuadorian postal service.
