= Jacinto Jijón y Caamaño =

Mayor of Quito

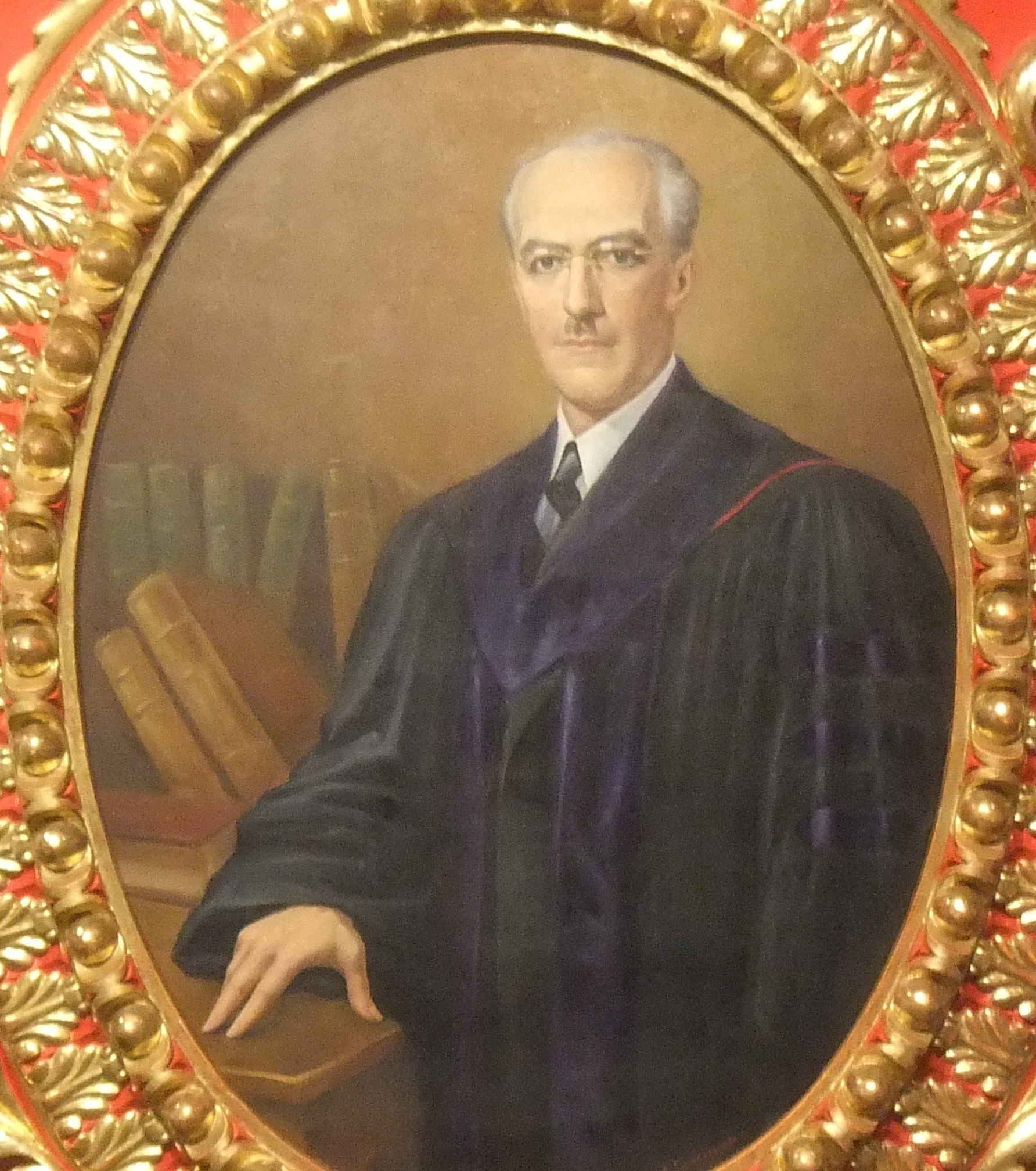
- Jacinto Jijón y Caamaño, painting in National Museum of Ecuador, by Enrique Gomezjurado

Mayor of Quito
- In office 1946–1948

Personal details
- Born: 11 December 1890
- Died: August 17, 1950 (aged 59)
- Occupation: Historian, archeologist, politician

Jacinto Jijón y Caamaño (11 December 1890 – 17 August 1950) was an Ecuadorian historian, archeologist, and politician. He was the mayor of the city of Quito (the capital of Ecuador) from 1946 to 1948. He was a member of the Ecuadorian parliament and a candidate for the presidency of Ecuador. He published several works about the pre-Hispanic history of cultures in Ecuador.

== Early life and education ==
Jijón y Caamaño was born in Quito in 1890 to Don Manuel Jijón Larrea and Doña Dolores Caamaño y Almada. He attended school in the city, where he was taught by Archbishop Federico González Suárez. In 1912, he and his mother traveled with a fellow pupil, Carlos Manuel Larrea, to Europe. There, Jijón y Caamaño developed his interest in the sciences, and learned English, French, and German.

Having also collected numerous books, he returned to Ecuador where he began to use his money to support his studies of pre-Hispanic settlements in the area.

== Career ==
As an archeologist, Jijón y Caamaño surveyed pre-Hispanic settlement near the town of Manta, mapping the largest structures. He was the first to use the term "Manteño" to describe such early coastal settlements. He believed that the Manteños had a culture that was more of a trading ring than a kingdom or empire. He drew parallels between their network and the Hanseatic League of Europe.

He wrote several works, including Quito y la independencia de America: discurso leido en la sesion solemne celebrada por la Academia Nacional de Historia ... en conmemoracion del I centenario de la batalla de Pichincha ("Quito and the independence of America: Address delivered at the solemn session held by the National Academy of History ... in commemoration of the centenary of the Battle of Pichincha", referring to Quito, capital of Ecuador, and the Battle of Pichincha). He also wrote books on archaeological topics, such as the Antropología prehispánica del Ecuador ("Pre-Hispanic Anthropology of Ecuador").

In addition to his archeological studies, Jijón y Caamaño became politically active. He was elected and served as mayor of Quito for a two-year term, from 1946 to 1948. He also was elected to the Ecuadorian parliament. In 1940, he ran as a candidate for the presidency of Ecuador.

== Bibliography ==
- Jijón y Caamaño, Jacinto. 1940–1945. El Ecuador interandino y occidental antes de la conquista castellana (Inter-Andean and Western Ecuador before the Castilian Conquest). Quito: Editorial Ecuatoriana.
