= Cayambe =

Cayambe may refer to:

- Cayambe (volcano), a stratovolcano in the Central Cordillera of the Ecuadorian Andes
- Cayambe, Ecuador, a town located at the foot of the volcano
- Cayambe Canton, a canton governed from the town
