= Coca Codo Sinclair Dam =

Hydroelectric dam in Ecuador

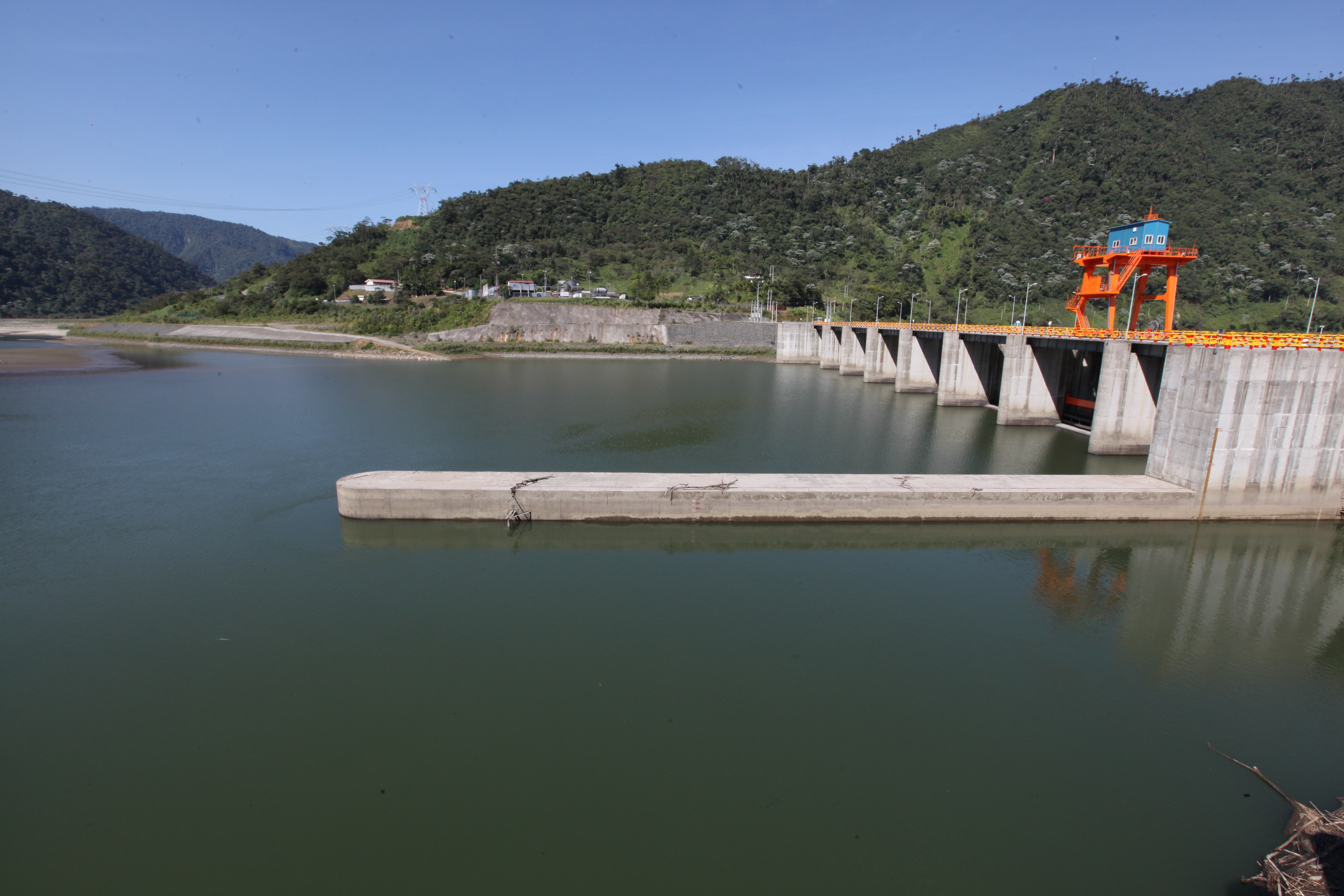

- Location within Ecuador
- Country: Ecuador
- Location: El Reventador
- Coordinates: 0°11′52″S 77°41′09″W
- Status: Operational
- Construction began: 2010
- Opening date: 2016
- Construction cost: US$2.6 billion
- Built by: Sinohydro-Andes JV

Dam and spillways
- Type of dam: Concrete-face rock-fill
- Impounds: Coca River
- Height (foundation): 31.8 m (104 ft)
- Length: 160 m (520 ft)

Power Station
- Commission date: 2016
- Hydraulic head: 620 m (2,030 ft)
- Turbines: 8 x 187.5 MW Pelton turbines
- Installed capacity: 1,500 MW (2,000,000 hp)

The Coca Codo Sinclair Dam is a hydroelectric dam in Ecuador. It is located on the Coca River in Napo Province, 100 kilometres (62 mi) east of Quito. It is the largest energy project in Ecuador. The dam was constructed by Chinese engineering firm Sinohydro Corporation, a contracting subsidiary of the state-owned Power China, for $2.25 billion.

The plant became fully operational in November 2016. It has a capacity of 1,500 megawatts.

== Funding of dam ==
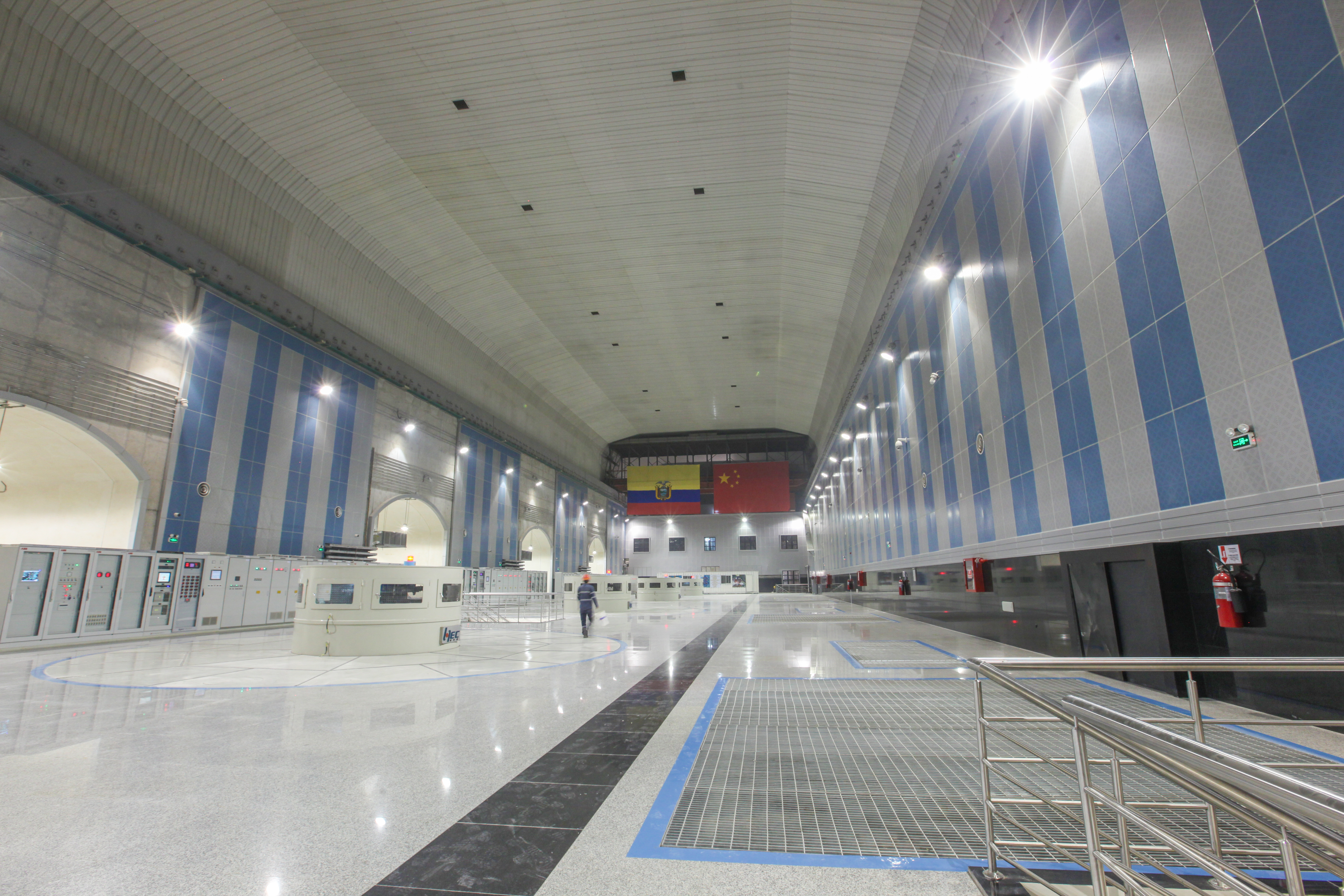
Ecuadorian and Chinese flags inside the hydroelectric power plant.

Over the years, China provided $19 billion in the form of loans to Ecuador for the construction of "bridges, highways, irrigation, schools, health clinics and a half dozen dams" including the Coca Codo Sinclair dam. According to an article in The New York Times, Ecuador repays its debt to China by providing China with oil "at a discount". By 2018, this meant that China imported 80 percent of oil produced in Ecuador. The loan from China’s Export-Import Bank for the Coca Codo Sinclair Dam amounts to $1.7 billion with an interest rate of 7% interest over 15 years which is $125 million a year in interest alone.

== Post construction ==
In December 2018, 7,648 large and small cracks were identified in the generator hall and in surrounding equipment. The cracks were first discovered in 2014 but the full extent of them is unknown as a thorough assessment would include deconstructing portions of the power plant which is cost prohibitive.

After the dam became operational, its reservoir caused regressive erosion upstream and water absent of sediment released from the dam has caused high rates of erosion downstream which likely led to two oil spills after pipelines along the river lost their footings. Downstream erosion, if left unchecked would undermine the dam and other oil infrastructure by 2022. Additionally, the erosion resulted in the destruction of San Rafael Falls further downstream and the resulting headward erosion is destroying the village of San Luis.

== Controversies and international relations ==
The Coca Codo Sinclair Dam has drawn scrutiny for both construction flaws and its broader geopolitical implications. In December 2018, Electric Corporation of Ecuador (CELEC), Ecuador’s public electricity company, reported that 7,648 cracks were present in key areas of the plant. These defects were initially discovered in 2014, but a complete evaluation has been avoided due to the high cost of deconstructive inspection.

The collapse of San Rafael Falls in 2020 triggered severe regressive erosion along the Coca River, threatening key infrastructure. This spurred bilateral cooperation between Ecuador and the United States. In May 2020, Ecuador activated a national task force to coordinate international assistance.

In May 2021, CELEC initiated an international arbitration case against Sinohydro, the Chinese state-owned company that built the dam, alleging serious structural defects including substandard welding and improper materials.

In July 2021, the U.S. Army Corps of Engineers conducted a site inspection, and by December 2021, Ecuador and the U.S. signed a memorandum of understanding for technical collaboration to monitor and mitigate erosion and protect the dam’s water intake.

In January 2024, USGS scientists found that the erosion front had migrated upstream and was just 7 kilometers from the dam’s intake, posing an escalating risk. In June 2024, U.S. officials met with CELEC executives in Quito to coordinate erosion and sediment control strategies.

On July 2, 2024, the plant was temporarily shut down due to sediment buildup. Ecuador imported power from Colombia to prevent outages.

In April 2026, Ecuador reached a settlement with Power China over the defects. The deal gives Ecuador $400 million in compensation while it keeps ownership, but Power China will operate and maintain the plant for 25 years and handle repairs.

The dam has become a focal point in the regional debate over Chinese infrastructure projects in Latin America. While earlier projections warned of possible collapse by 2022, the dam continues to operate under heightened international supervision and risk monitoring.

== See also ==
- Karuma Hydroelectric Power Station, another infrastructure project of Sinohydro
