= San Rafael Falls =

Waterfall on the Coca River in Ecuador

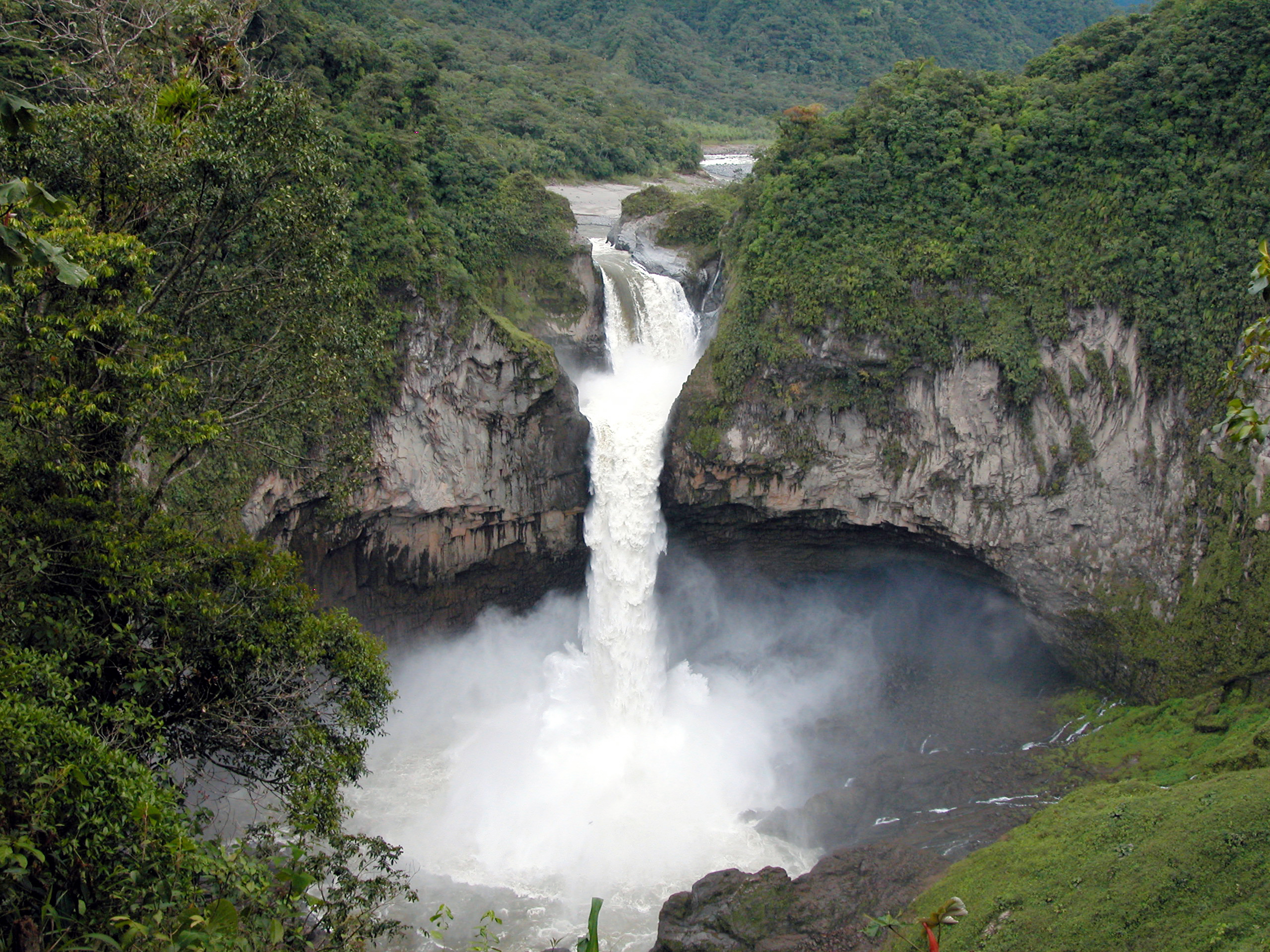
- San Rafael Falls in 2012
- Interactive map of San Rafael Falls
- Location: Sucumbíos and Napo, Ecuador
- Coordinates: 0°06′13″S 77°34′53″W
- Type: Tiered plunges (until 2015); Plunge (2015–2020)
- Total height: 131 m (430 ft) (until 2020)
- Number of drops: 2 (until 2015); 1 (2015–2020)
- Total width: 30 m (98 ft) (until 2020)
- Average width: 23 m (75 ft) (until 2020)
- Run: 46 m (151 ft) (until 2020)
- Watercourse: Coca River
- Average flow rate: 293 m^{3}/s (10,300 cu ft/s)

San Rafael Falls (Spanish: Salto de San Rafael) was a waterfall on the Coca River in Sucumbíos and Napo, Ecuador. Standing 131 metres (430 ft) high, it was the tallest and most powerful waterfall in Ecuador and a popular tourist attraction. The falls were located at the eastern boundary of Cayambe Coca National Park, in the eastern Andean foothills about 170 kilometres (110 mi) to the east of Quito.

On February 2, 2020, the falls collapsed into a massive sinkhole behind the layer of hard volcanic rock that formed its lip, creating a large natural bridge spanning the Coca River. The natural bridge also collapsed about one year later, leaving an open ravine at the former site of the falls. During its brief existence, the natural bridge may have been the longest in the world, exceeding China's Xianren Bridge. The waterfall itself retreated upstream as a result of rapid headward erosion and disappeared within a few months as the river carved a new, more gradually descending channel.

The collapse of the falls has significantly altered the Coca River, with a deep new canyon appearing upstream of the former falls, and large volumes of sediment depositing downstream. Upstream erosion destroyed several bridges and oil pipelines, and as of 2023 threatens to undermine the Coca Codo Sinclair Dam, which was built upstream of the falls in 2016. Increased erosion as a result of the dam trapping sediment is thought by some researchers to have accelerated the collapse of the waterfall, although the phenomenon would likely have happened eventually due to the natural erosive force of the river.

== History ==
The San Rafael Falls were formed thousands of years ago by debris and lava flows from the nearby El Reventador volcano, whose caldera is located about 9 kilometres (5.6 mi) to the west. About 19,000 years ago, a large section of the eastern side of the volcano collapsed, causing a massive debris flow of loose rock and soil into the Coca River valley. After that, the volcano erupted and a 100-metre-thick (330 ft) basaltic lava flow blocked the Coca River, forming a highly erosion-resistant lava dam on top of the initial debris flow deposit. The natural impoundment behind the dam eventually filled with a mix of fluvial sediments and additional volcanic material from El Reventador, while the river spilled over the top of the barrier forming a waterfall.

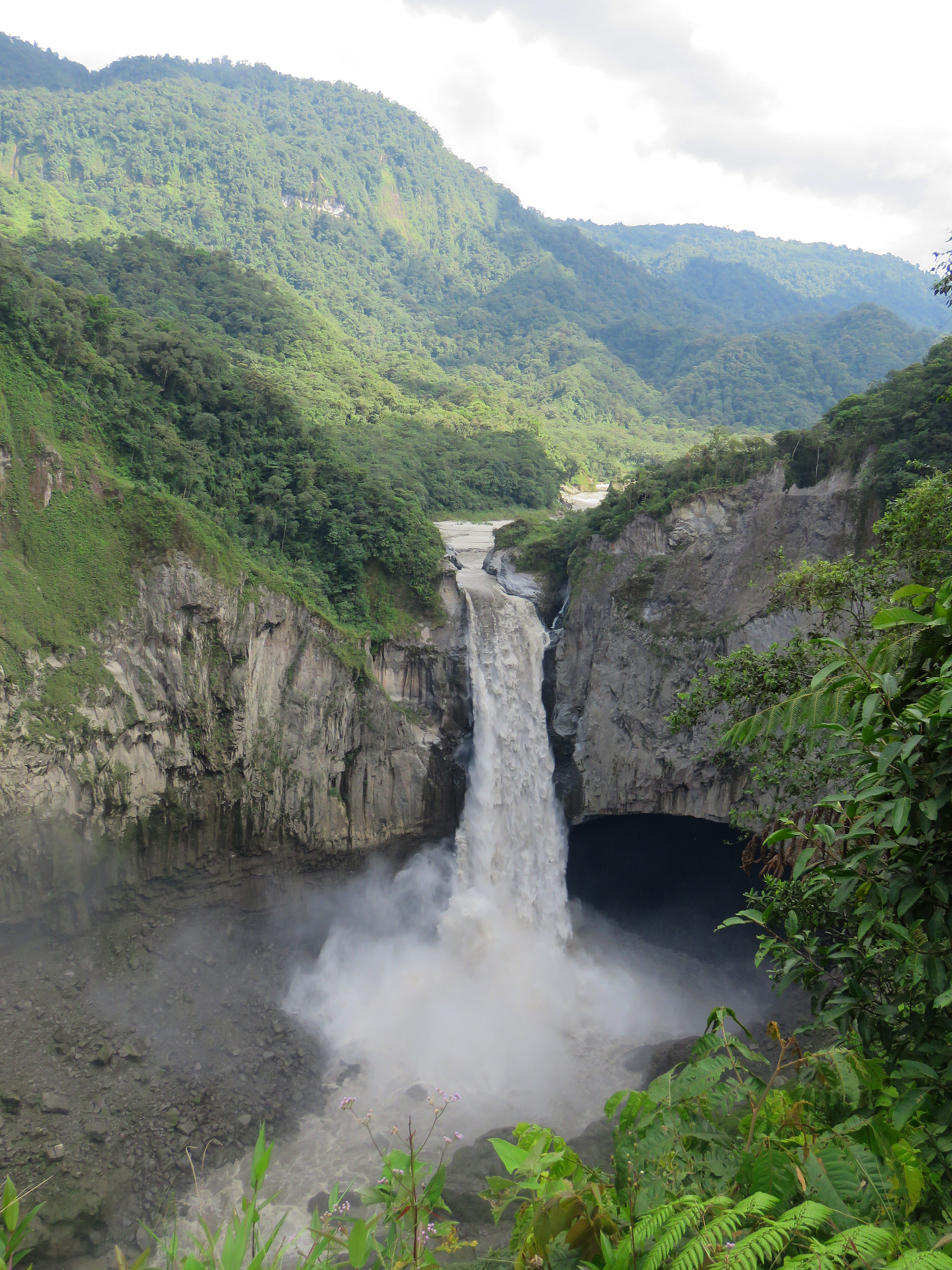
San Rafael Falls in August 2019, less than one year before its collapse into a sinkhole

The debris flow material downstream of the lava dam washed away, increasing the drop to over 130 metres (430 ft). Over thousands of years, the plunge pool at the waterfall base continued to expand, creating a large overhanging precipice and cavern where the hard basalt layer rested atop the loose material below. At this point, the knickpoint became relatively stable, with the overhanging basalt protecting the loose material below from further upstream erosion. The area around El Reventador remains tectonically active. A March 1987 earthquake caused large debris flows into the Coca River that reached San Rafael Falls. The debris flows reached an estimated depth of 20 metres (66 ft) at the falls.

Prior to the collapse, the falls were a major tourist attraction for the area. In 2019 about 30,000 people visited the falls. The falls were accessible by an approximately thirty-minute hike from nearby Hostería El Reventador (about 50 kilometres (31 mi) by road northeast of El Chaco) which brought visitors to a scenic view point, "La Mirador", above the falls. Although located near the Cayambe-Coca National Park, the falls themselves were actually on a small private preserve.

In 2010, construction had begun on the Coca Codo Sinclair Dam about 19 kilometres (12 mi) upstream from the waterfall. The 1,500 megawatt hydroelectric plant, Ecuador's largest power station, was designed to divert water around a large bend ("codo") of the Coca River, utilizing the natural drop of the waterfall and river to generate power. Despite creating significant controversy over its ecological impact and its potential to reduce the flow of the waterfall, the project was completed in 2016. The developers of Coca Codo Sinclair promised to maintain a minimum flow of 22 cubic metres per second (780 cu ft/s) over the falls, or about one-quarter of its typical dry season flow.

The waterfall had been undergoing noticeable geomorphic changes since the 1990s, when it fell in two distinct stages: a smaller upper cascade followed by a large lower plunge. By about 2010, much of the lower lip of the falls had eroded away, bringing the two tiers close together; in 2015 that section collapsed completely, and the waterfall became a single uninterrupted plunge.

== 2020 collapse and impacts ==
In June 2019, a sinkhole formed above the falls and water was observed to emerge from the bottom of the cliff face, suggesting that water was seeping through the loose material under the lava dam and thus bypassing the falls. On February 2, 2020, the sinkhole abruptly collapsed, swallowing a large portion of the flow of the Coca River, which proceeded to burst out from underneath the lava dam. By February 6 the remaining loose material under the lava dam had been washed away and the full volume of the Coca River flowed beneath it, creating a massive natural bridge and effectively removing the knickpoint the waterfall represented. A new waterfall appeared immediately upstream where the sinkhole had been located. The sudden river rejuvenation initiated headward erosion of the loose unconsolidated sediment in the riverbed, causing the waterfall to quickly retreat upstream.

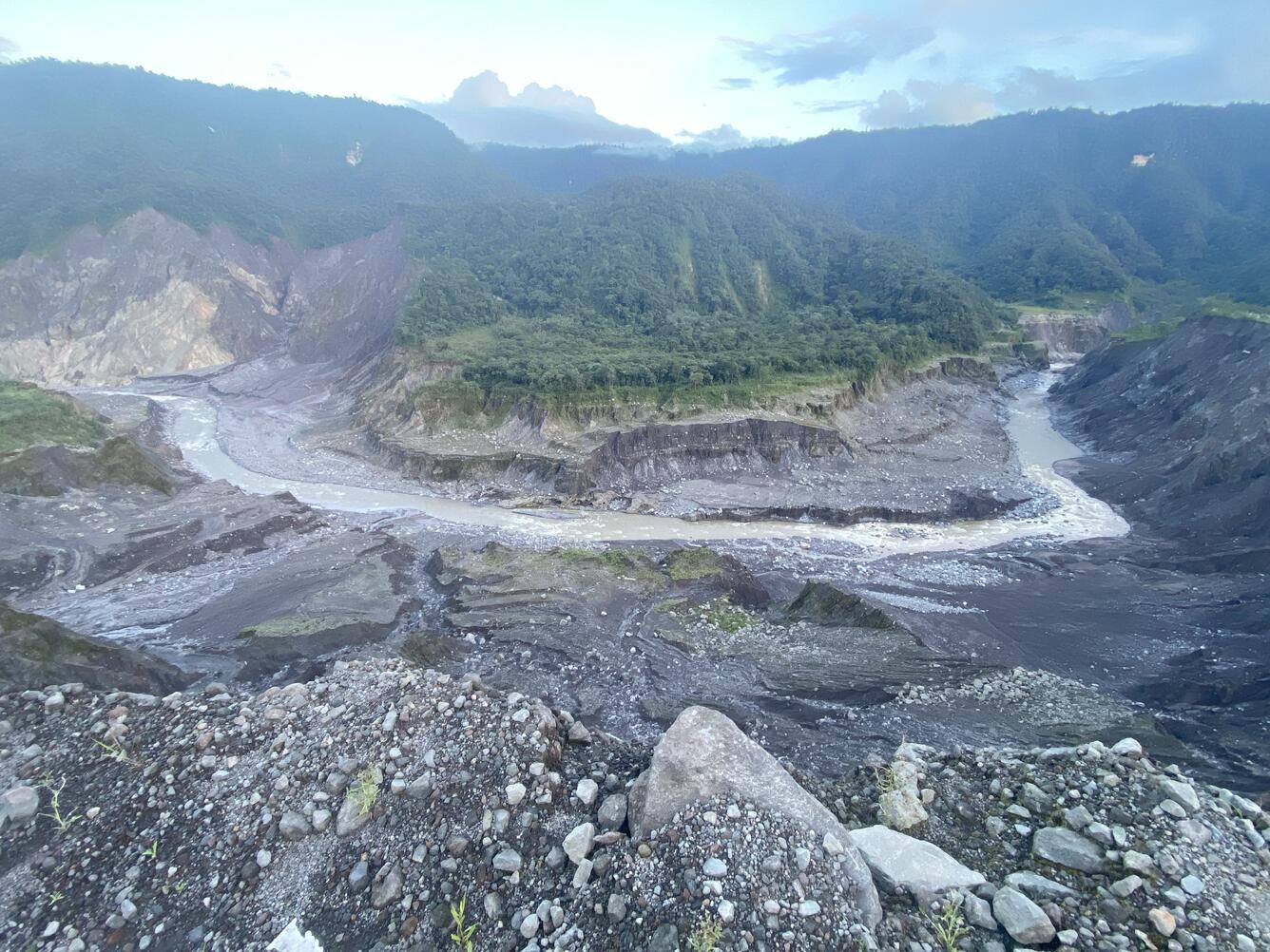
Massive erosion has damaged the landscape upstream of the falls.

In July 2020, five months after the initial collapse, erosion had progressed 3.8 kilometres (2.4 mi) upstream, forming a canyon 100 metres (330 ft) deep in places. As the river gradient equalized, the waterfalls evolved from a single plunge to multiple small, separated drops, and eventually were reduced into rapids. Ecuador's Ministry of Energy began constructing temporary grade controls in the river in an attempt to slow the rate of erosion. The natural bridge collapsed approximately one year later in February 2021, briefly damming the river before being overtopped and washed away in a large outburst flood.

Sucumbíos' Emergency Operations Committee restricted access to the area as the Ecuador Ministry of Environment began to investigate the incident. Erosion soon threatened critical infrastructure upstream. On April 7, 2020, the sinking riverbed broke oil pipelines belonging to the Trans-Ecuadorial Pipeline System, Crudos Pesados Oil and Poliducto Shushufindi-Quito. About 15,000 barrels of crude oil spilled into the Coca River and soon entered the Napo River. Oil was detected as far downstream as Cabo Pantoja, Peru. The oil spill affected more than one hundred primarily indigenous communities, many of which are economically dependent on fishing. On April 30 a lawsuit was filed seeking damages from the oil companies. By August, bypasses had been constructed to route the oil pipelines away from the river, while downstream communities continued to express concern over the speed of remedial action. In December 2021, the U.S. Army Corps of Engineers and the Electric Corporation of Ecuador (Corporación Eléctrica del Ecuador, or CELEC) signed a memorandum of understanding to study options for mitigating erosion and protecting upstream infrastructure, particularly the Coca Codo Sinclair Dam, which could be damaged or destroyed if headward erosion reaches that point.

Large waves of sediment unleashed by the collapse have drastically changed the downstream reaches of the Coca River. About 250 million tonnes (Mt) of sediment was mobilized in the first year after collapse, and by early 2023, three years later, this had increased to 500 Mt. The three-year sediment volume is comparable to the total amount transported in 43 years after the 1980 eruption of Mount St. Helens. As of 2023, massive aggradation has buried the former riverbed downstream, with sediment piling up as much as 40 metres (130 ft) at a point 2 kilometres (1.2 mi) below the former waterfall. At the outlet of Coca Codo hydroelectric plant, 44.5 kilometres (27.7 mi) downstream, the river bed has risen 1 to 2 metres (3.3 to 6.6 ft), which threatens to limit the amount of water that can pass through the power station and thus its electrical output. This has been mitigated so far by dredging, but a long-term solution has yet to be determined. Flooding and water quality impacts tied to the collapse have been reported at Puerto Francisco de Orellana, 90 kilometres (56 mi) downstream from the falls.

By early 2023, erosion had progressed 11.3 kilometres (7 mi) upstream from the original waterfall location. Some 287 hectares (710 acres) of riverside land have collapsed and at least three bridges have been destroyed. Headward erosion is expected to continue for another 28 kilometres (17 mi) before the river achieves a stable gradient, which would be more than enough to reach the Coca Codo Sinclair Dam, unless the river encounters a harder rock layer before that point. The headward erosion has also begun to affect tributaries, particularly the Río Malo, which joins the Coca about 10 kilometres (6.2 mi) upstream from the former waterfall.

== Investigation ==
While all waterfalls experience headward erosion, many researchers and groups have suggested that the Coca Codo Sinclair Dam may have increased the effect of erosion on the falls, causing it to collapse sooner than from natural geologic forces alone. Emilio Cobo, leader of the IUCN's South America Water Program, surmised that the dam accelerated the collapse by trapping sediment upstream, starving the river of sediment and increasing its erosive force. The National Polytechnic School of Ecuador had studied the impacts of the dam after its construction, estimating that river erosion increased by 42 percent as a result of dam operation.

According to Alfredo Carrasco, an Ecuadorian state geologist, the collapse of the waterfall was probably not significantly affected by damming, but the rapid riverbed erosion that followed was made worse by the dam. After the collapse, Carrasco had expressed concern over the potential impact on infrastructure such as bridges and oil pipelines, but no remedial action was taken before that infrastructure was undermined and destroyed. Geologist Carolina Bernal stated, "I had doubts that the Coca Codo Sinclair plant influenced what happened with the San Rafael waterfall [on Feb. 2], but now, after seeing the aggressiveness of the phenomenon, it can be linked with the sediment management of the project. Hydroelectric plants must be planned very carefully."

== See also ==
- Pailón del Diablo
- List of waterfalls
- List of waterfalls by flow rate
