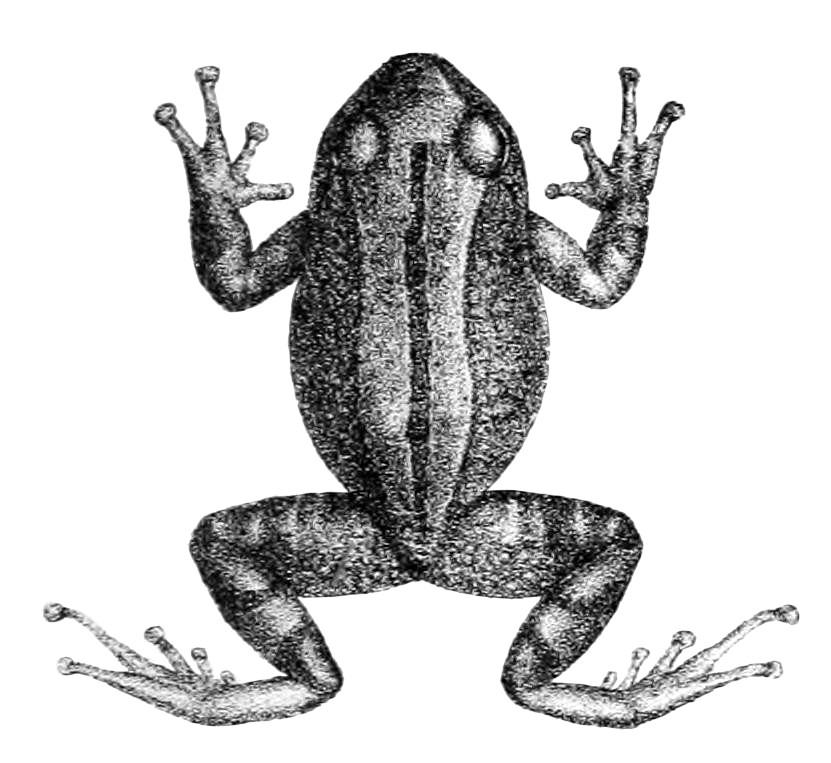

Conservation status
- Least Concern (IUCN 3.1)

Scientific classification
- Kingdom: Animalia
- Phylum: Chordata
- Class: Amphibia
- Order: Anura
- Family: Strabomantidae
- Genus: Pristimantis
- Species: P. buckleyi

Binomial name
- Pristimantis buckleyi (Boulenger, 1882)

Synonyms
- Eleutherodactylus buckleyi (Boulenger, 1882)

= Pristimantis buckleyi =

Species of frog

Pristimantis buckleyi is a species of frog in the family Strabomantidae. It is found on the Andes of Colombia and Ecuador. Specifically, it occurs on the both flanks of the Cordillera Central and on the eastern flank of the Cordillera Occidental in Colombia, and on the Cordillera Real in Ecuador south Cayambe, at elevations of 2,500–3,700 m (8,200–12,100 ft) asl.

Pristimantis buckleyi is named after Mr. Buckley, the collector of the type series from Intac, Imbabura Province of Ecuador.

== Habitat ==
Pristimantis buckleyi is a common frog inhabiting primary and secondary forest and forest edges, sub-páramo bush land, páramo, open areas, and croplands.

== Description ==
Males are smaller (24–39 mm (0.94–1.54 in) in snout–vent length) than females (37–49 mm (1.5–1.9 in)) and have longer hind limbs. Colouration is variable but ranges from gray-tan to yellow-brown through darker browns to reddish brown or black. The dorsum has black flecks; the skin has low, flat warts. Tympanum is distinct.
