= Hacienda Guachalá =

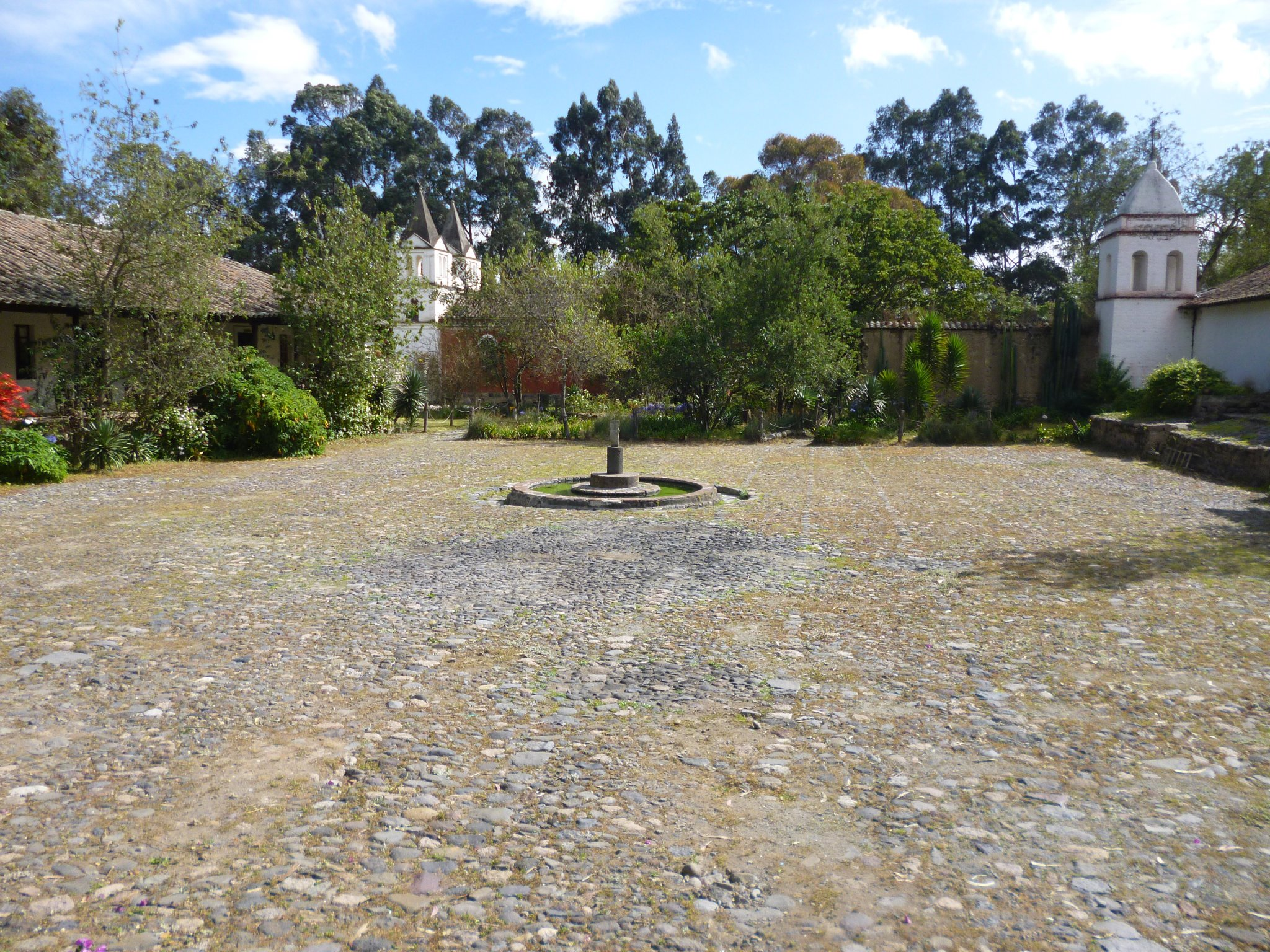
- Hacienda's main patio view. Behind, is possible to appreciate both church buildings.

- Location within Ecuador

General information
- Type: Hacienda
- Architectural style: Colonial
- Location: Guachalá,, Panamericana Km. 45 vía Cangahua, Pichincha,, Cayambe (canton seat), Ecuador
- Coordinates: 0°2′25″S 78°10′15″W
- Elevation: 2,730 m (8,960 ft)
- Opened: 1580

Dimensions
- Other dimensions: 22ha

Website
- www.guachala.com/english

The Hacienda Guachalá is known as the oldest hacienda in Ecuador, and the most important hacienda until the middle of the 20th century. The oldest buildings date from the year 1580, and at its apogee comprised more than 21000 ha. It hosted members of the French Geodesic Mission, Gabriel García Moreno, an Ecuadorian former president; Neptalí Bonifaz, first president of Central Bank of Ecuador. Cristóbal Bonifaz, founder member of the Charles Darwin Foundation, Diego Bonifaz, a former Mayor of Cayambe during 2000-2011 period, and Rafael Bonifaz, former Elastix distro community manager.

Since its conversion in 1993, Hacienda Guachalá remains open as a hostal and as a historic tourism destination.

== History ==
=== During the encomienda time ===
In 1535, Francisco Pizarro designed Pedro Martín as encomendero of several regions, including Cayambe. He collected tributes from two Caciques: Gerónimo Puento, grandson of indigenous leader Nasacota Puento, and the Mitimae leader Joan Mitma, son of Diego Pallo, Cacique of Cuzco.

By 1548 the encomienda was inherited by his son, Alonso Martín de Quesada, and Joan Mitma was succeeded by Francisco Cacuango Guachalá under Fabián Puento orders, leaving Guachalá mitimaes depending on the Cayambis. After Alonso's death, his wife inherited the encomienda and probably married Martín de Aizaga, who appears as encomendero of Cayambe by 1573 with 2.100 súbditos and a 500 pesos income. In 1585, the Cayambe Encomienda was transferred to the Spanish crown and the Council of Quito delivered Martin 100 stables (equivalent to 1,100 ha) in Guachalá by way of compensation. The first church was built at this time.

== Purchase and conversion into textile centre ==
Between the end of 16th and the beginning of the 17th Century, Alonso de Carvajal reached an accord with the natives of Guachalá to graze his sheep in exchange for money. Alonso' grandson, Francisco de Villacis, inherited the estate on Alonso's death, and paid 300 ounces of silver to the Crown for the titles of the estates, Perugachi and Guachalá on November 22 of 1647. These titles were conferred by Marquis of Mancera. With his niece and wife, María de Villacís y Loyola, he founded the Majorat of Villacis in Guachalá. On October 27, 1660, Pichincha Volcano erupted, causing disaster in all crops in the region as a result of their being covered under volcanic ash.

After Francisco de Villacís' death on 1679, María inherited the hacienda and married captain Antonio de Ormaza y Ponce de León. In 1697 the latter purchased the Hacienda Pambamarca from the Presbyterian Fernando Santos del Estoque, unifying both haciendas under the name of Guachalá. In 1698 Antonio obtained a license allowing textile production that would be exported, mainly to Lima, Santafé de Bogotá and Spain.

== Visit of the French Geodesic Mission ==
In 1736 the French Geodesic Mission led by La Condamine and Jorge Juan y Antonio de Ulloa came to Ecuador in representation of Spain. It is not certainly known if La Condamine stayed at Guachalá, but it is confirmed that part of the Mission recognized the Cayambe Valley and stayed there, establishing Cerro Pambamarca as a reference point.

La Condamine relates that the stakes put to realize the investigations were stolen each by natives even putting at risk their own lives, because they believed that they were used to delimitate the Spanish domains and stripping them of the few properties still own by them induced by murmuring of landowners, stewards and foremen in vicinity.

Because of this, and added to the steepness of the ground in the Guachalá the Mission decided to continue their measurements on the plain of Yaruquí. However, it is believed that they placed a stone tablet indicating the equator 2 km from the main house, dividing the hacienda between the two hemispheres. It is not known the precise place where it was put, but today it rests in the Astronomical Observatory of Quito.

Between 1743 and 1744 Jorge Juan y Antonio de Ulloa in his journey to Quito relates the visit of Joseph de Eslaba, who was detained in the Hacienda's wool mill because the owners weren't willing to change an apex their relationship with the natives.

"Not only the working hours were twelve or more, but also many of them never came out again alive".

The historian Ramon Galo also says:

"It was a inexpugnable territory, impassable even to officials of the Crown. The order to go to the mills causes more fear to indians than all rigorous punishment the wickedness they have invented against them".

== During the Republic ==
In 1840, the Hacienda was purchased by Adolfo Klinger, a German citizen who came to Ecuador with the army of Simon Bolivar under the rank of colonel. He married Valentina Serrano, an orphan whose adoptive family tried to hide her from Adolfo as they did not want him to marry their daughter. In 1844, Adolf died in a revolt caused by unfounded suspicions that he should impose on the region of Cayambe a payment of a contribution of 3 pesos and 4 reales to every citizen with the exception of Indians and slaves imposed by the General Flores, and the estate is inherited by Valentina Serrano and her daughters, including Virginia Klinger.

In the Colombian Civil War (1860–1862), Valentina provided refuge to Arcesio Escobar, a Colombian emissary in Quito ordered to be arrested by García Moreno after the former demanded that he support General Arboleda. Ecuador declared war against Arboleda en 1862. In 1865, Valentina Serrano sold the hacienda to Juan and Carlos Aguirre Montúfar. They rented the hacienda to Gabriel García Moreno in 1868, who planted the first eucalyptus forests with specimens acquired from Australia. García Moreno returned the hacienda in 1875, just a few months before his assassination.

On March 28 and 29th of 1880, the English scientist Edward Whymper discovered in Guachalá eleven new species of insects, of fourteen he found as said in conformity with his journey book. Nine years later, the brothers Aguirre Montúfar auctioned the Hacienda by 170,000 sucres to pay off debts to Vicente Tinajero a merchant and money-lender, who died in 1891 of typhoid fever. It is related that Tinajero buried fifty thousand sterling pounds somewhere in the farm and took the secret of its location to the grave. The next year, his son, Ramón Tinajero Portugal, sells it to Josefina Ascázubi Salinas de Bonifaz, daughter of Garcia Moreno's brother-in-law Manuel de Ascásubi and granddaughter of Juan de Salinas y Zenitagoya.

Although Josefina had been disinherited for getting married with Neptalí Bonifaz Febres, a Peruvian diplomat, she recovers her share of the inheritance thanks to her mother, Carmen Salinas, who bought Guachalá to Tinajero with the help of renowned lawyer Luis Felipe Borja Pérez.

In this transaction is virtually settled the woolen mill and to the workers are given huasipungos.

On 1895, the Hacienda administration is handed over to Emilio Bonifaz Febres, Josefina's brother-in-law, who after experimenting with many varieties of grass plants, he publishes a book about the cultivation of pasture in Ecuador.

On 1922 Josefina rents the Hacienda to Juan Manuel Lasso, who, after closing the church pretends to begin a socialist revolution in Ecuador from Guachalá conforming a revolutionary army consisting of Indians and farm workers. When the National Army arrived, they fled away and Lasso was forced to exile. Two years later, Josefina Ascázubi's dies, and the hacienda is inherited by his son Neptalí Bonifaz Ascázubi and Manuel Bonifaz Panizo, his grandson. On 1927 Neptalí would become president of the Central Bank of Ecuador, whose creation led with Luis Napoleón Dillón.

In the presidential elections of October 20 and 21, 1931, Neptalí Bonifaz Ascásubi is elected president of Ecuador, but before taking office August 20, 1932, is disqualified by the Congress who declared him unfit to exercise the presidency by 46 votes against 38 accused of having been born in Peru. The September 27, Neptalí Bonifaz moves to Quito, and, after obtaining the support of four army battalions he sublevates but he is defeated by the army in the War of the Four Days that killed over 2,000 people.

Outside politics Neptalí devoted the rest of his days managing Guachalá introducing modern techniques learned in Europe. In 1938 concluded the construction of a new church in Guachalá and restored the cult that had been forbidden to the Indians by Juan Manuel Lasso. In 1939 he was appointed Chairman of the Central Bank of Ecuador again as an apology for the incident in 1931 and after having proved that he was from Quito.

On 1947, the hacienda is divided among the children of Neptalí Bonifaz: María, Cristobal and Emilio Bonifaz Jijón, and Luis de Ascázubi. Luis developed the first fighting cattle in Ecuador, and also a milk cattle who developed together with his brothers Christopher and Emilio.

The following year Pambamarca workers, dissatisfied with the butler take the state being suffocated by police sent by the president Carlos Julio Arosemena Tola. On 1953 there is another rebellion by workers of Pitaná who had not received a year's pay. In a failed attempt to take over the House of Finance, they are brutally repressed by the army in a battle that left four people dead and several wounded.

From 1954 to 1968 Casa Vieja, the estate of Mary Bonifaz was used as a school. In 1963 the owners of the Hacienda are condecorated by the government by abiding a new Agrarian reform Law before its expedition who guaranteed the delivery of huasipungos to the huasipungueros. In 1970 another reform promoted by the government limiting the extent of the property, leads to the hacienda owners to get rid of much of their land by giving it to its workers, selling terrains and donating it to their progeny.

The 1987 Ecuador earthquakes destroyed many indigenous houses around Guachalá and caused damage to the Old House of Finance.

After the death of Mary Bonifaz, his brother Cristóbal unifies the Old House to immediately divide among 4 of his children. The younger of them, Diego Bonifaz, and electrical engineer and former major of Cayambe, bought it to his brothers transforming it into a hostel in 1993.

== Current division ==
Currently, the Hacienda includes:

=== Old chapel ===
It was built in 1580 on an ancient Inca temple during the encomenderos Alonso Martí and Martín Aizaga period. It is the oldest building in the estate. On one wall is a deteriorated painting, dating from 1757 with a representation of Heaven and Hell. With the creation of the parish of Cangahua in 1779, many functions that the church in Guachalá had been carrying were relocated.

It was closed in 1922, by Colonel Juan Manuel Lasso Ascásubi, founder of the Ecuadorian Socialist Party. When Neptalí Bonifaz wanted to reopen it, Catholic priests were opposed because, in their words, the Old Chapel was profaned by Lasso and he was forced to build a new church.

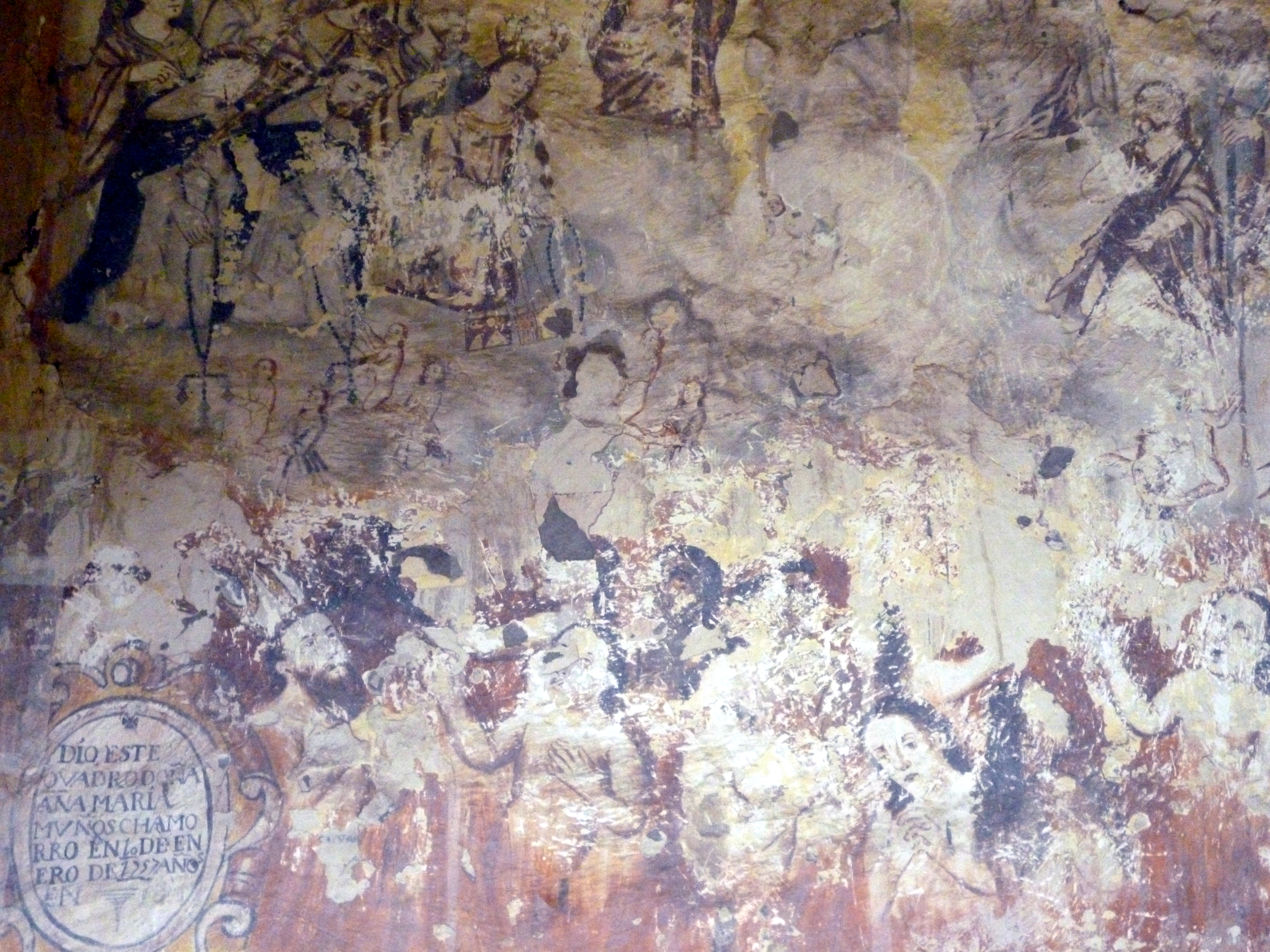
Old Chapel Painting. In the inferior left corner is possible to appreciate the inscription: "Dio este cuadro Doña Ana María Muñoz Chamorro el 1ro enero 1757. (This painting was given by Doña Ana María Muñoz Chamorro January 1, 1757)

=== Main patio ===
It is located at the center of the main house. In the center, above the water pile is a Huaca Siqui, a sacred symbol of Kayambi Culture who survived to destruction after conquest period, given to Diego Bonifaz as a gift by the community of Oyacachi in 1987.

=== New church ===
It was built between 1935 and 1938 by Neptalí Bonifaz to restore the native religion that had been forbidden by Juan Manuel Lasso. In 2010 five human fetuses were found in the main crypt, when some workers were performing repairs on it. The origin of the fetuses is still unknown.

=== Quitsato kinder school ===
It's a kinder school managed by hacienda owners who applies the Montessori Method as teaching system.
