= Emily Hoyle =

British mountain climber (1984–2022)

Emily Annabelle Pearce Gould (26 July 1984 – 27 November 2022), commonly known as Emily Hoyle, was a British mountain climber.

== Early life and family ==
Hoyle was born in London in 1984 to venture capitalist Rupert Pearce Gould and Frances Royle, a former nurse. She was diagnosed with cystic fibrosis at an early age along with her brothers, Edward, and Harry. The family later relocated to Cambridge, where she attended St Mary's School, followed by Rugby School. Later, she attended Bristol University, where she studied pure physics.

In 2008, she married John Hoyle, a Scots Guard officer.

== Career ==
Hoyle began her career as a banker at Standard Chartered Bank in London and Abu Dhabi, before transitioning to becoming a Pilates instructor.

Hoyle's most notable achievement in mountain climbing occurred in 2015, following a double lung transplant in 2012. She was part of a team of organ transplant recipients on an expedition initially aimed at climbing Cotopaxi in South America. Due to volcanic activity, the team redirected to Cayambe, Ecuador's second-highest volcano. Her ascent to 5,350 meters set a record for the highest altitude climbed by a female double lung transplant recipient.

An advocate for cystic fibrosis awareness, Hoyle was also known for raising funds for organ preservation technology. She died in 2022 at the age of 38.
