= Quitsato Sundial =

Coordinates: 00°00′00″N 78°10′30″W

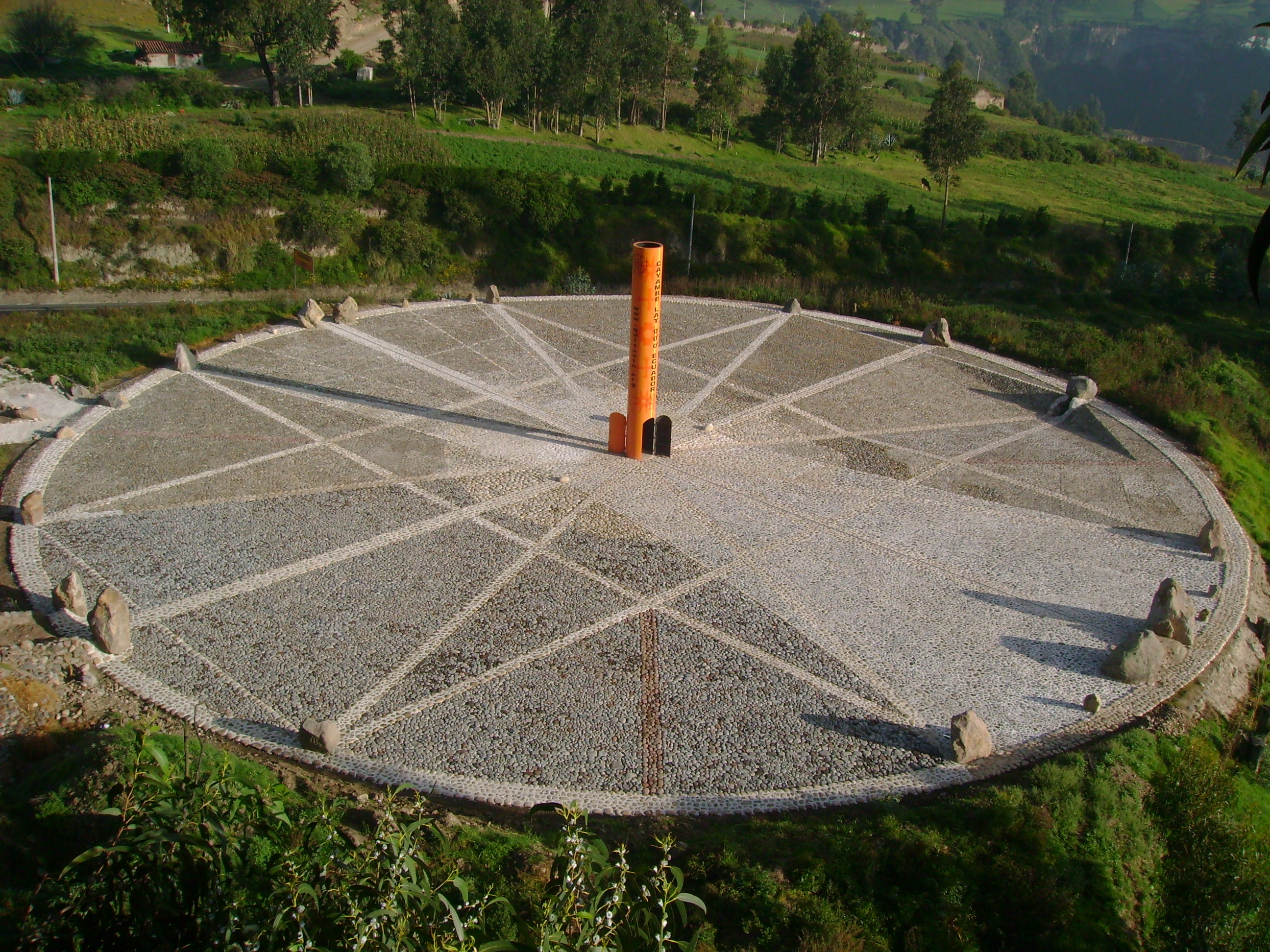
- Panoramic view of Quitsato Sundial located exactly at Equator. Because of its design, the shadow projected by the gnomon on the dial lines can indicate solstices, equinoxes, and also months of the year with great precision.
- Interactive map of the Quitsato Sundial area

General information
- Type: Sundial
- Location: La Mitad Del Mundo, Cayambe, Ecuador
- Opened: 2006
- Inaugurated: 2007

Dimensions
- Diameter: 54 m (177 ft)

Technical details
- Floor area: 2300 m^{2}

The Quitsato Sundial is a cultural-tourist place located at La Mitad Del Mundo, near to Cayambe, 47 km north of Quito, Ecuador. It was built in 2006 and inaugurated in 2007 as an independent, non-profit project in a 24,756 ft^{2} (2,300 m^{2}) area. Its main goal is to share crucial aspects of the astronomical knowledge of the prehispanic cultures of the region. The expositions are carried out by community members as a self-sustaining project.

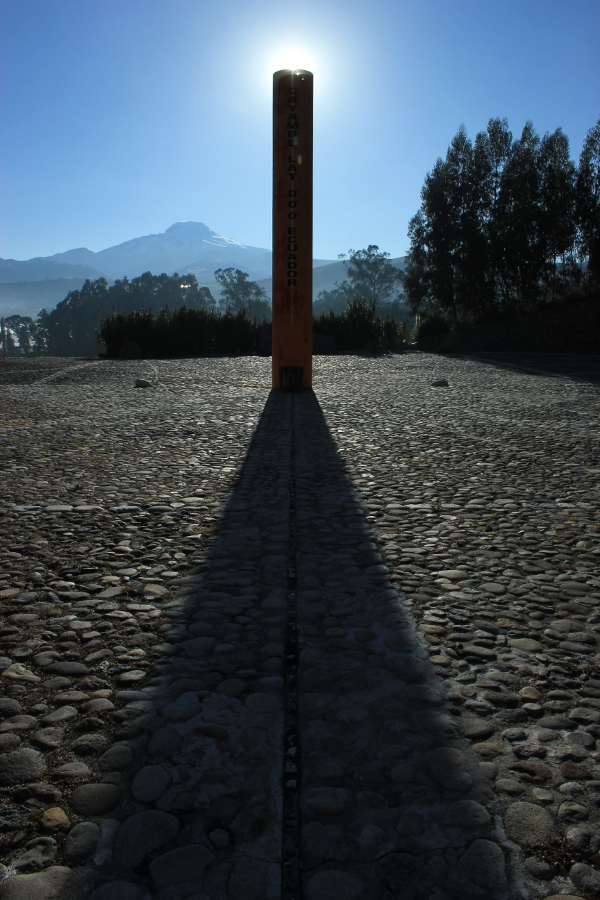
Projection of the shadow of the gnomon at the equinox. Cayambe (volcano) can be seen behind, the only place where the Equator passes through a glacier. Also, it is the highest point on the Equator in the world.

== Structure ==
It consists of a circular platform of 54 m (177.64 ft) in diameter which forms a mosaic of light and dark pebbles drawing an eight-pointed star that indicates the solstices and equinoxes, plus intermediate lines pointing to the cardinal directions. In the center of this platform there is a 10 m (32.80 ft) high, 1.30 m (4.27 ft) diameter cylindrical orange tube which serves as a gnomon, pointing to the corresponding hours and months of the year in the platform according to the shadow cast by the Sun. The ten-meter-high (33 ft) gnomon represents the metric system, based in the meter, which in its origin was intended to equal one ten-millionth of the quadrant of the Earth's circumference. The purpose of the color difference between the stones, apart from showing equinox and solstice lines, is to explain the meaning of albedo and its use in astronomical study. The Equator line is drawn by using smaller, darker pebbles between two metal plates.

The angles that form the geometric design of the eight-pointed star are given by the tilt of the Earth with respect to the ecliptic of the Earth, thus the platform itself also presents a reading of the celestial mechanics. Detailed positions of the solstices and equinoxes, as well as their respective axes, are presented.

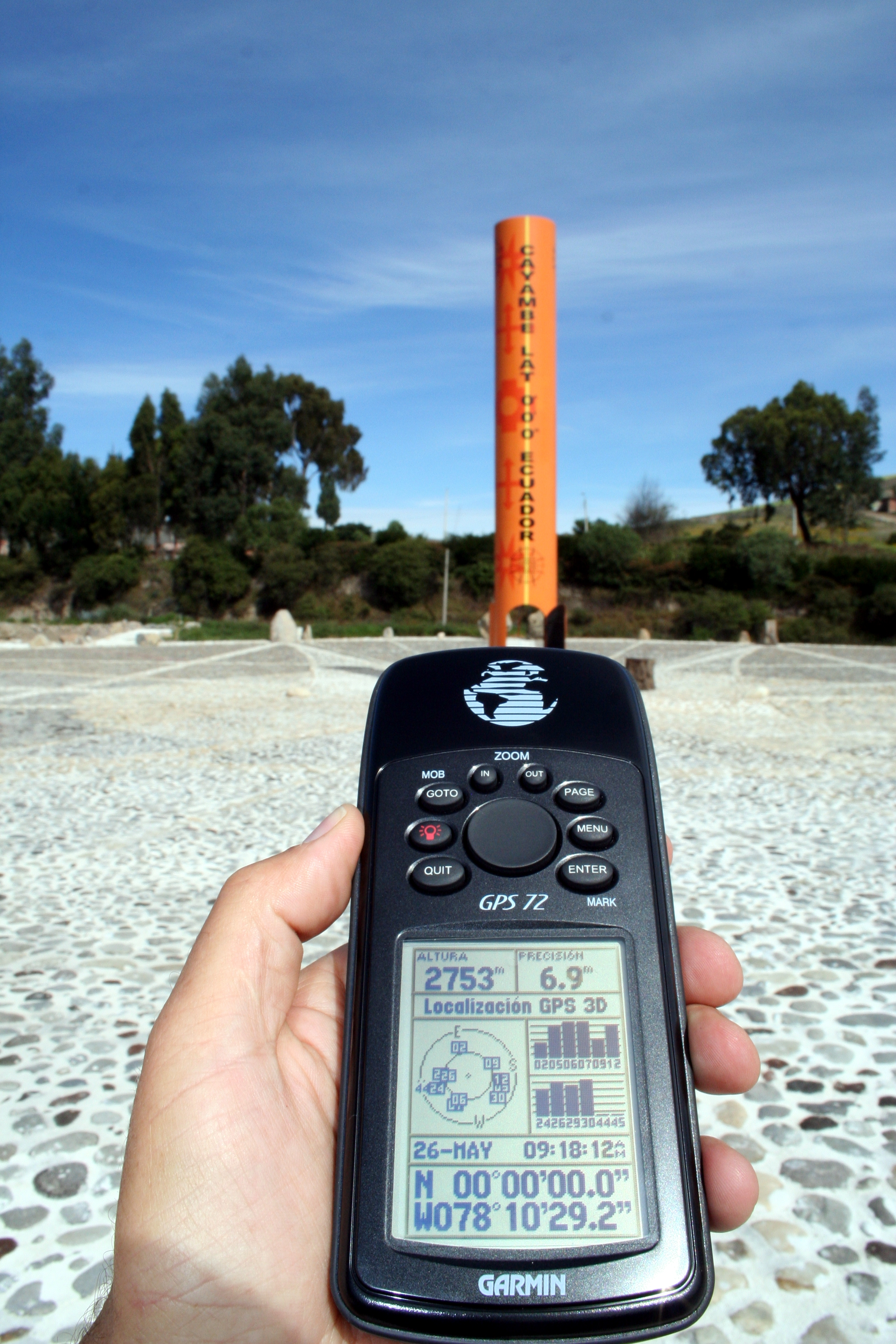
A GPS reading of the Equator north of the sundial.

The Ecuadorian Military Geographic Institute has placed two cylinders surrounded by concrete on a platform on top of the Equatorial line, with a 1 mm error margin determined by using GPS and GNSS equipment.
