= Sinohydro =

Chinese state-owned hydropower engineering and construction company

Sinohydro Corporation
- Native name: 中国水电
- Type: State-owned enterprise
- Traded as: SSE: 601669
- Industry: Civil engineering
- Founded: 1950
- Founder: Hydrochina Corporation; Sinohydro Group Ltd.
- Headquarters: Beijing, China
- Area served: Worldwide
- Key people: Song Dongsheng (宋东升), Chairman
- Parent: Power Construction Corporation of China
- Website: www.sinohydro.com

Sinohydro (中国水电; full name: 中国水利水电建设集团公司) is a Chinese state-owned enterprise engaged in hydropower and civil engineering construction. It is a major subsidiary of the Power Construction Corporation of China (PowerChina) and is among the world's largest international contractors in the hydropower sector. In the 2012 Engineering News-Record Top 225 Global Contractors list, Sinohydro ranked 14th globally and 6th among Chinese firms.

== History ==
Sinohydro was established in 1950 and is headquartered in Beijing, China. During the late 1950s, its predecessor entities supported China's diplomatic initiatives by implementing foreign economic aid construction projects. In the 1980s, HydroChina Corporation received governmental authorization for foreign economic and technological cooperation. On April 10, 1993, Sinohydro was granted foreign trade rights, marking a significant step toward entering the international market.

In 2000, Sinohydro introduced the "four unities" strategy to standardize its overseas operations: unified management, unified resource allocation, unified branding, and unified external cooperation. This approach laid the groundwork for rapid expansion.

From 2004 onward, the company engaged in a wide range of renewable energy projects—hydropower, thermal, solar, and wind—with a combined installed capacity exceeding 108 million kilowatts. Further strategic reforms in 2006 and 2009 focused on building Sinohydro’s global development platform and integrating international operations.

By the end of 2010, the company maintained 69 overseas offices across 53 countries and managed 261 projects in 57 nations. In 2011, following State Council approval, PowerChina was formally established as the parent company, consolidating 105 subsidiaries including Sinohydro.

On March 10, 2016, Sinohydro's international business functions were merged with those of HydroChina to form POWERCHINA International.

== Operations ==
The company operates through Sinohydro Ltd (中国水利水电建设股份有限公司) and other affiliates, including Sinohydro Consulting. Its services cover:

- Civil engineering and hydropower construction
- Electric power investment and real estate
- Design and manufacture of construction equipment
- Project financing, consulting, and mechanical/electrical installation

Sinohydro is active in a wide range of sectors including water conservancy, transportation infrastructure (roads, railways, ports), municipal works, and building construction.

Sinohydro has expanded internationally and operates in over 50 countries across Asia, Africa, Europe, and the Americas. Its European regional headquarters is located in Belgrade, Serbia.

== Notable Projects ==
=== Asia ===
- Bangladesh – Padma Bridge river training works (2014), contract worth BDT 87.08 billion
- Pakistan – Tarbela IV Extension Project (2013), hydropower plant for WAPDA
- Sri Lanka – Port of Hambantota and Moragahakanda Dam projects
- Iran, Indonesia – various infrastructure projects

=== Africa ===
- Nigeria – Zungeru Hydropower Station, US$1.01 billion (2012)
- (Uganda) – Karuma Hydroelectric Power Station, 600 MW, US$2.2 billion (2013)
- (Algeria) – Construction of photovoltaic power stations (2013)
- (Tunisia) – Mellegue Dam project near El Kef (2016)

=== Europe ===
- (Georgia (country)) – Tbilisi ring road project, US$129 million (2012)

=== Middle East ===
- Qatar – New Hamad Port, 57-building infrastructure project (2015)
- Israel – EPC contractor for hydroelectric project near Kibbutz Gesher (2016–2022)

=== Americas ===
- Ecuador - Coca Codo Sinclair Dam (2016)
- Honduras – Construction of the controversial Río Blanco dam for DESA

== See also ==
- Electric power industry in China
- Renewable energy in China
