= Pailón del Diablo =

Waterfall in Ecuador

Coordinates: 1.4038°S 78.2953°W

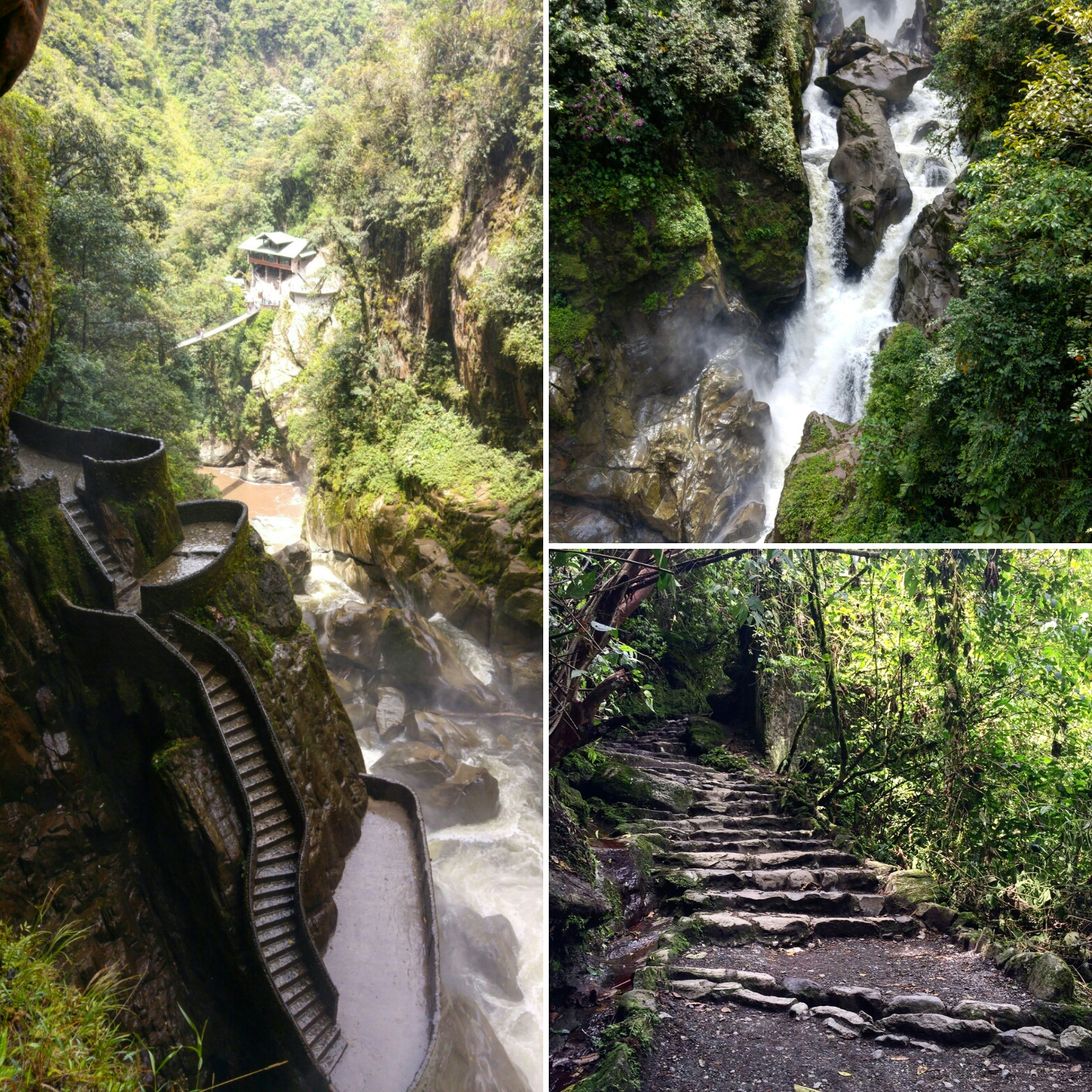

Pailón del Diablo (Spanish for "Cauldron of the Devil") is one of the most famous waterfalls in Ecuador, located near the town of Río Verde in the Tungurahua Province. It remains as Ecuador’s largest waterfall as of the 2020s, after the San Rafael Falls disappeared.

== Description ==
The Pailón del Diablo Waterfall is formed by the Río Verde river and merges into the Pastaza River. shortly after its drop. The waterfall is known for its powerful flow, violent turbulence, and the distinctive rocky formation near the falls that resembles the face of a devil — inspiring its name, which dates back at least to the 1940s. The surrounding basin is often referred to as a cauldron due to the intense splashing and mixing of the water.

The height of the Pailón del Diablo Waterfall is approximately 80 meters (260 feet), making it a dramatic and popular tourist destination.

== History ==
According to the old timers in Rio Verde, the name "Pailón del Diablo" has been in use since the 1940s. Angel Lascano, a local from the town of Rio Verde, states that he and a couple other people came up with the name in the 1940s. He was attending the Catholic Church and because he was insistent that the name remain on the waterfall,. he was excommunicated because the parish priest at that time felt the word Diablo should not be included in the name. There are oral recordings of his testimony in this matter. Around this time, the city of Baños de Agua Santa designated materials and funding to build a suspension bridge across the Pastaza River at the mouth of the waterfall. This bridge served primarily to transport produce across the river to market, but it also granted rare glimpses of the powerful waterfall at a time when access was otherwise difficult.

For much of the 20th century, the Pailón del Diablo remained relatively hidden due to poor road infrastructure.

In the 1990s, Wilo Guevara purchased land from his father-in-law on the lower, Puyo-side of the waterfall. He slowly developed the property into a tourist attraction, naming it Pailón Grieta al Cielo. Around the same period, Donald Wolfram, a Quiteño, purchased land on the Baños-side of the waterfall and developed a shorter route providing full views of the waterfall. This property was first known as Isla del Pailón and later renamed Cascada El Pailón.

Briefly, a third access was opened above the waterfall called Falls Garden, but it did not succeed commercially.

Folklore

Local folklore explains that the name Pailón del Diablo (“Devil’s Cauldron”) was inspired by the shape and power of the waterfall, which some said resembled a devil’s face in the rock formations. According to tradition, the nearby San Miguel Waterfall was named for the archangel Michael (San Miguel in Spanish), who is believed to watch over the Devil and ensure he remains trapped below.

== Current entrances ==
Today, the Pailón del Diablo Waterfall can be visited through two main entrances:

=== Short route (Cascada El Pailón) ===
The short route, originating from Río Verde, is approximately four times shorter than the longer route. It features several attractions along the way, including views of the nearby San Miguel Waterfall. One of the most unique features of this side is the Encañada del Duende, a hidden emerald lagoon surrounded by natural tropical plants situated between the Pailón del Diablo and San Miguel waterfalls.

Visitors on the short route can experience two asymmetrical double suspension bridges, providing a full panoramic view of the entire 80-meter drop. The short route has been consistently recognized by TripAdvisor as a top tourist destination, frequently winning the "Traveler's Choice" award for the region.

=== Long route (Pailón Grieta al Cielo) ===
The longer route primarily follows the lower side of the waterfall. It allows visitors to approach closely beside the waterfall but does not offer a full frontal view. Unlike the short route, the long route has fewer attractions leading up to the falls themselves. But it does include the dramatic staircases often seen in the photos.

== Visiting ==
Visitors can reach the town of Río Verde from Baños de Agua Santa via tourist buses or the traditional open-air Chiva buses. From Río Verde, entrances to both routes of the Pailón del Diablo Waterfall are accessible by foot.

== Name confusion ==
In recent years, misinformation has circulated suggesting that the waterfall was historically called "Cascada Río Verde." Some publications, including a CNN Spanish video and a National Geographic article, inadvertently repeated this claim. This misinformation was based on a song which was said to refer to it as Cascada, Rio Verde, however, the song actually refers to "Cascada Río Blanco," not the Pailón del Diablo. As of today, Ecuador officially recognizes the traditional name "Pailón del Diablo," which is widely featured in national tourism campaigns., magazines, and specifically one called the World‘s Most Amazing Places. Which put the Pailón del Diablo listed as the 100+ spectacular bucket list destinations. This was published in 2021. Pailón del Diablo has also been featured by LATAM Airlines in a promotional video created by the media company UFF to showcase Ecuador's natural beauty.
