= Payamino River =

River of Ecuador

Location
- Country: Ecuador

Physical characteristics
- Mouth
  - location: Napo River

The Payamino River is a river of Ecuador. It is a tributary of the Napo River, merging into the latter at the city of Puerto Francisco de Orellana. The Coca River also merges into the Napo River in the city, but at a point about 1.5 km (0.93 mi) downstream from the Payamino–Napo confluence.

== See also ==
- List of rivers of Ecuador
