= Puerto Francisco de Orellana =

Coca Puerto Francisco de Orellana (El Coca)
- City
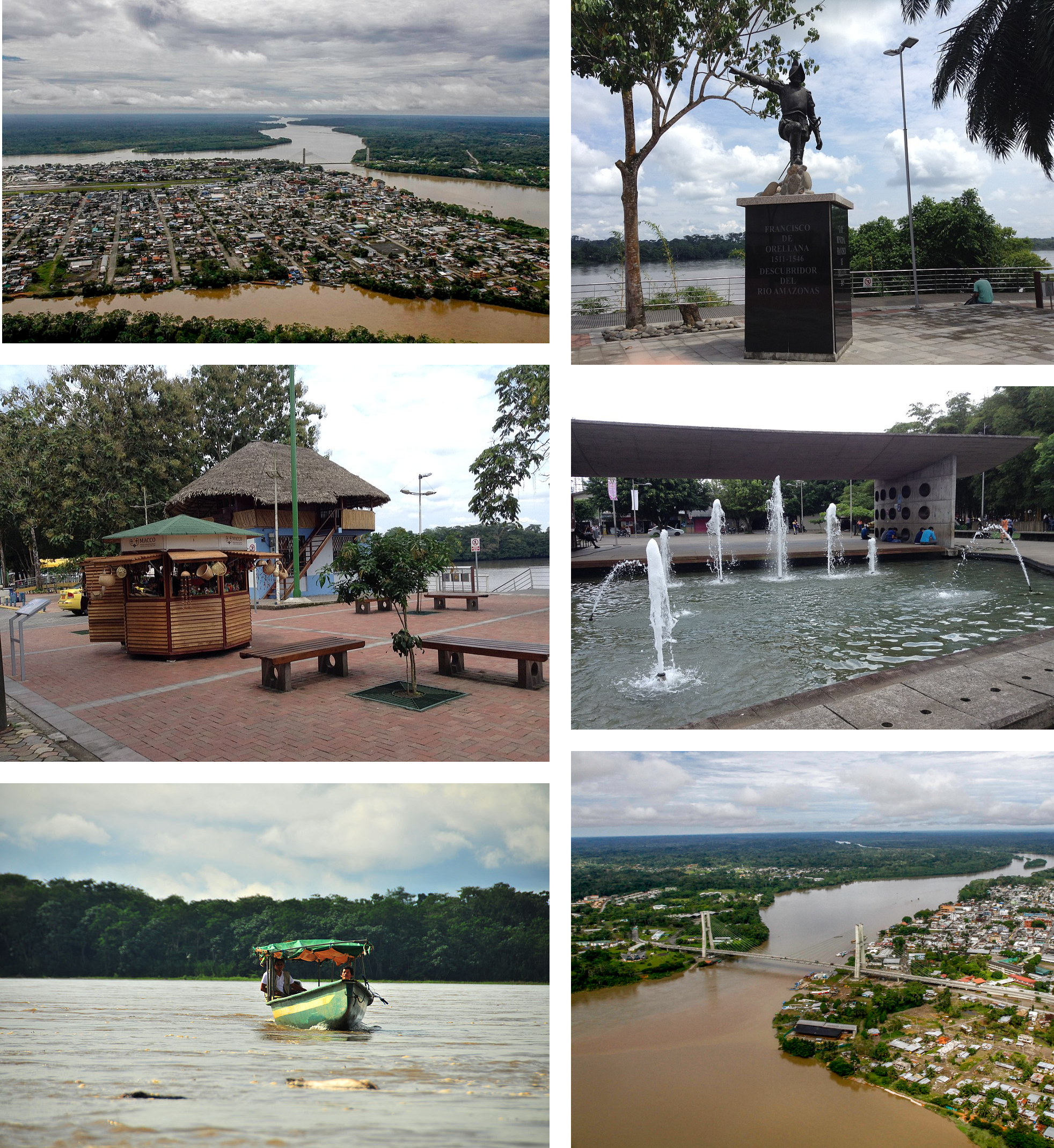
- From top, left to right: Panoramic view of the city, monument to Francisco de Orellana, Puerto Francisco de Orellana Boardwalk, Child's Park, canoe down the Napo River and Napo River Bridge.

- Flag

- Location within Ecuador
- Coordinates: 00°27′45″S 76°59′03″W
- Country: Ecuador
- Province: Orellana
- Canton: Francisco de Orellana Canton

Area
  - City: 16.72 km^{2} (6.46 sq mi)
- Elevation: 300 m (980 ft)

Population (2022 census)
  - City: 51,281
  - Density: 3,067/km^{2} (7,944/sq mi)
- Demonym: Orellanese
- Time zone: ECT
- Area code: (+593) 6
- Climate: Af
- Website: www.orellana.gob.ec (in Spanish)

Coca (pronounced [ˈkoka]) (also known as Puerto Francisco de Orellana (Spanish pronunciation: [ˈpweɾto fɾanˈsisko ðe oɾeˈʝana]) or El Coca (pronounced [el ˈkoka])) is the capital of province of Orellana in eastern Ecuador. The city is located in the Amazon rainforest at the confluence of the Coca River and the Napo River (the smaller Payamino River also merges into the Napo in the city). It has a population of 51,281 as of 2022. It is visited by tourists traveling into the rainforest and is served by the Francisco de Orellana Airport.

== Overview ==
The city is named for Francisco de Orellana, who explored the confluence of the Coca River and the Napo River. It is believed that he set sail from the current location of the town eventually making his way into the Amazon River seeing the "Amazon" or tribes in which the women also fought. Eventually Francisco de Orellana made it to the Atlantic. He made a second expedition leaving but died on the Amazon delta unable to find a way through.

== Government ==
The new mayor of the town was Antonio Vera in 2019 to replace Anita Rivas who had served since 2005.

== Climate ==
Coca has a tropical rainforest climate (Af) with heavy rainfall year-round.

Climate data for Coca
Month	Jan	Feb	Mar	Apr	May	Jun	Jul	Aug	Sep	Oct	Nov	Dec	Year
Mean daily maximum °C (°F)	29.9 (85.8)	30.0 (86.0)	29.7 (85.5)	29.3 (84.7)	29.0 (84.2)	28.6 (83.5)	28.5 (83.3)	29.6 (85.3)	30.2 (86.4)	30.4 (86.7)	30.5 (86.9)	30.5 (86.9)	29.7 (85.4)
Daily mean °C (°F)	24.8 (76.6)	25.0 (77.0)	24.9 (76.8)	24.7 (76.5)	24.4 (75.9)	24.1 (75.4)	24.0 (75.2)	24.5 (76.1)	25.0 (77.0)	25.1 (77.2)	25.4 (77.7)	25.3 (77.5)	24.8 (76.6)
Mean daily minimum °C (°F)	19.8 (67.6)	20.0 (68.0)	20.1 (68.2)	20.1 (68.2)	19.9 (67.8)	19.7 (67.5)	19.5 (67.1)	19.4 (66.9)	19.8 (67.6)	19.9 (67.8)	20.3 (68.5)	20.1 (68.2)	19.9 (67.8)
Average rainfall mm (inches)	243 (9.6)	279 (11.0)	235 (9.3)	374 (14.7)	329 (13.0)	293 (11.5)	241 (9.5)	185 (7.3)	252 (9.9)	308 (12.1)	309 (12.2)	271 (10.7)	3,319 (130.8)
Source: Climate-Data.org
