= Cayambe Canton =

Coordinates: 0°13′S 78°31′W

Cayambe Spanish: Cantón Cayambe Quechua: Kayampi kiti
- Canton
- Cayambe Canton
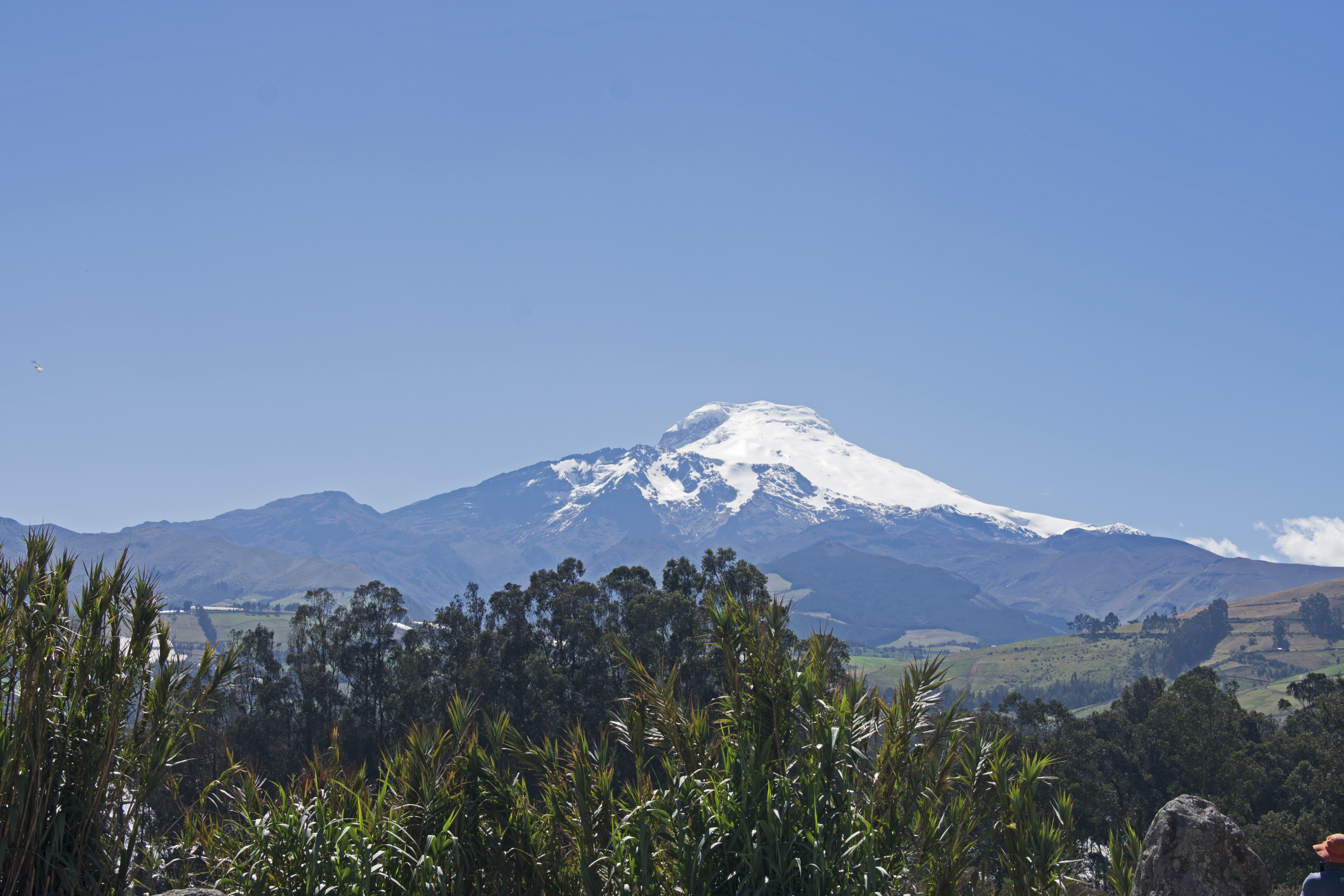
- Cayambe volcano seen from Quitsato Sundial

- Location of Pichincha Province in Ecuador.

- Cayambe Canton in Pichincha Province
- Country: Ecuador
- Province: Pichincha
- Creation of the canton: 1883-07-23
- Canton seat: Cayambe
- Parishes: Ascázubi, Ayora, Cangahua, Cayambe, Cusubamba, Juan Montalvo, Olmedo, Otón

Area
  - Total: 1,199 km^{2} (463 sq mi)

Population (2022 census)
  - Total: 105,267
  - Density: 87.80/km^{2} (227.4/sq mi)
- Website: https://web.archive.org/web/20090226040737/http://www.municipiocayambe.gov.ec/

Cayambe is a canton in the northeast of the province of Pichincha, in northern Ecuador, South America. The canton is named after the Cayambe, a 5,800-meter-high snow-covered stratovolcano in the east of the canton. The main part of the canton occupies the eastern portion of the Pisque river basin and is surrounded by volcanoes.

The seat of the canton, also named after the volcano, is Cayambe. The economy of the canton is agricultural, based on raising cattle and producing dairy products and growing flowers for export in greenhouses, and also cereals for local consumption. The Swiss food company Nestlé and the Cayambean company Miraflores have dairy-product factories in the city of Cayambe.

The Pambamarca Fortress Complex, several pre-Columbian pucaras (hilltop forts), is located in Cayambe Canton on the slopes of Pambamarca volcano. Here, the Cayambe people defended their territory from the Inca Empire in a war that took place in the late 15th and early 16th century.

== Notable people ==
Dina Farinango was born in Cangahua in Cayambe, in 1993 and went on to be member of the National Assembly.

== See also ==
- Dolores Cacuango
