= Cayambe, Ecuador =

Cayambe Kayampi
- City
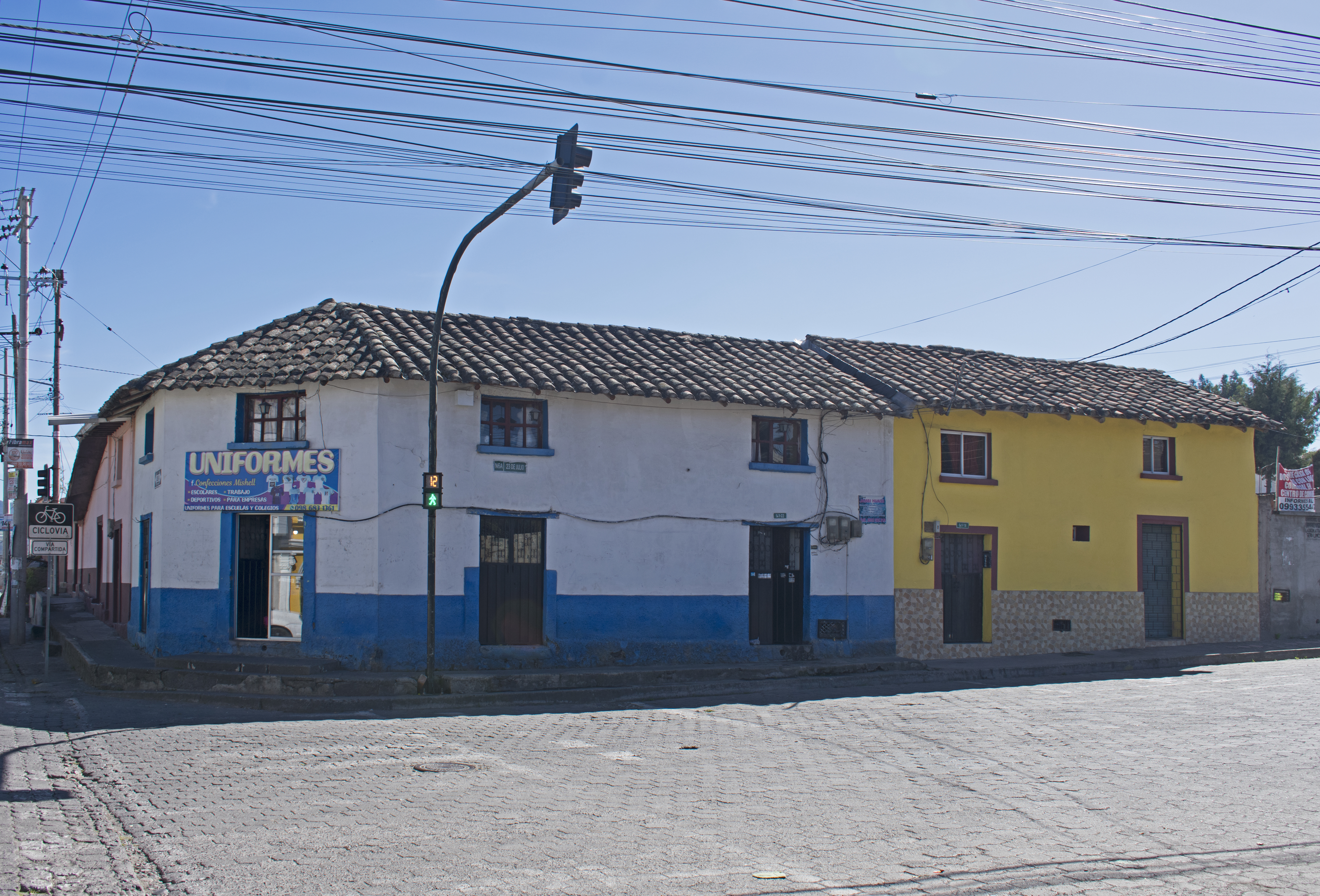
- Calle 23 de Julio

- Flag
- Motto: It is my passion (Es mi Pasion)
- Location of Cayambe within Pichincha and Ecuador
- Coordinates: 0°02′38″N 78°09′22″W
- County: Ecuador
- Province: Pichincha
- Canton: Cayambe
- Legal creation: July 23, 1883
- Urban parishes: List: Ayora; Cayambe; Juan Montalvo

Government
  - Mayor: Alberto Masapanta (2023-2027)
  - Vice Mayor: Ana María Lema Valencia

Area
  - City: 11.71 km^{2} (4.52 sq mi)
- Elevation: 2,830 m (9,280 ft)

Population (Census 2022-10-01)
  - City: 44,559
  - Density: 3,805/km^{2} (9,855/sq mi)
- Time zone: UTC-5 (ECT)
- Climate: 14° Csb

Cayambe is an agricultural service city (population 44,559 at the last census on October 1, 2022) in highland Ecuador. It lies at the foot of the Cayambe volcano. While the city is mainly peopled by mestizos, the surrounding rural population is primarily composed of indigenous people who are mainly involved in subsistence agriculture, dairy farming and procurement of lumber. It is the third-largest city in Pichincha Province.

== History ==
Cayambe's indigenous people of today are descendants of the pre-Inca Kayambi people. The Kayambi were resistant to Inca expansion and were only definitively conquered by Huayna Capac (the eleventh Sapa Inca of the Inca Empire) after a bloody 20-year war. At that time, the Kayambi people adopted the Kichwa language, a dialect of the Quechua family of languages. Not long afterwards, in the 16th century, the first Spanish conquistadores arrived in the region. Kichwa survives in some of the hamlets today, while in others it has given way to Spanish.

== Government ==
The town of Cayambe is the seat of the canton of Cayambe.

== Industry ==
The area hosts numerous flower plantations, whose products are destined for the overseas cut flower market. Among the local food products, better known are cheese and biscochos de Cayambe (a crumbly biscuit).

== Points of interest near Cayambe ==
1. A globe monument, known as "La Bola de Guachalá" (The Ball), located on the Pan-American Highway in the village of Buena Esperanza.
2. The Quitsato Sundial, located in the village of Buena Esperanza, is among the most accurate places in the world created to determine equator position.
3. Hacienda Guachalá, located in the village of Buena Esperanza, is the oldest hacienda in Ecuador.
4. Castillo de Guachalá, an eclectic-style castle located in the village of Cuniburo.
5. the waterfalls of Cariacu.
6. the virgin forests of Paquiestancia.
7. the archeological museum near Puntazil.

== Gallery ==
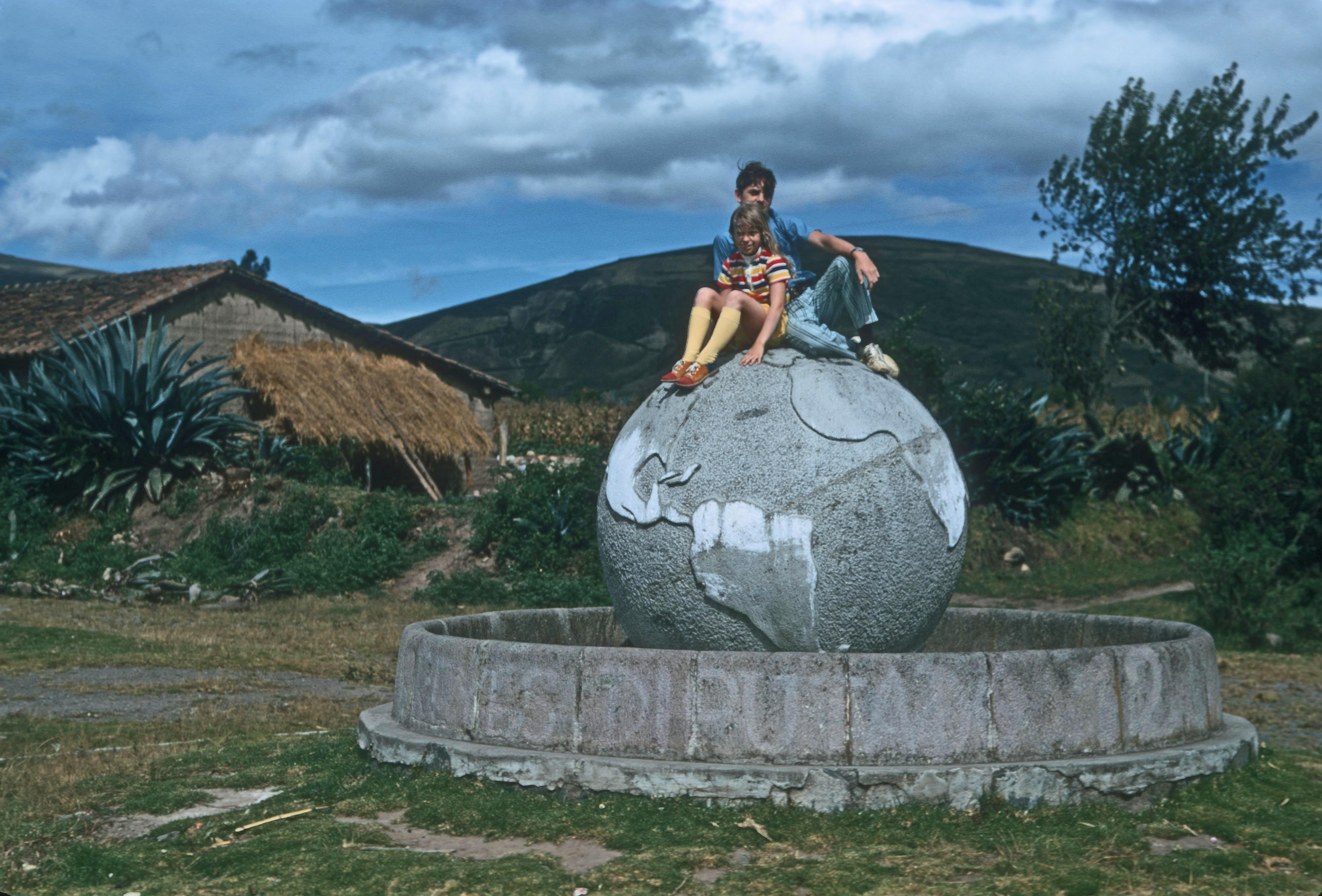
The ball on the Pan-American Highway.

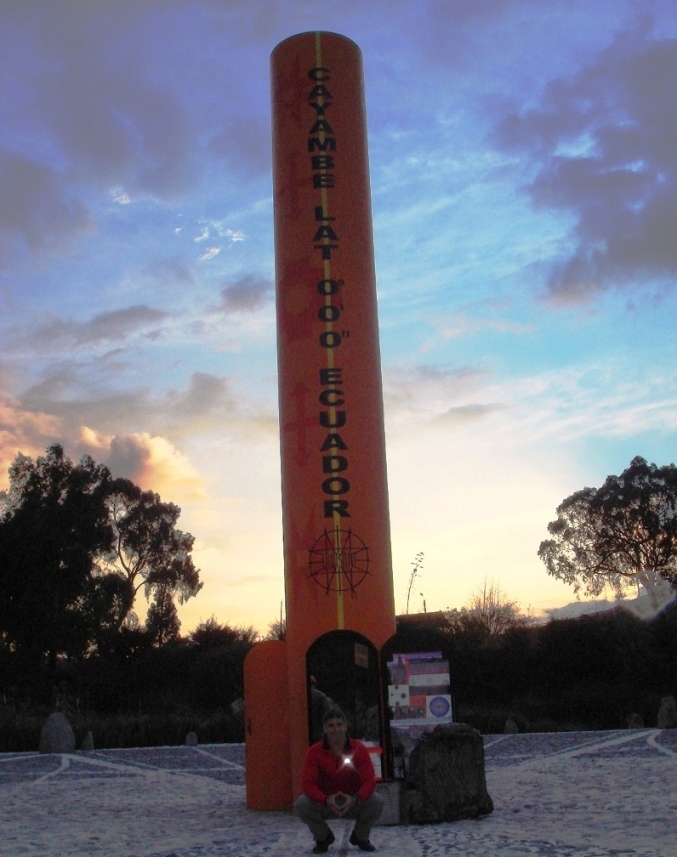
Quitsato Sundial, located on the Equator in Cayambe, Ecuador.

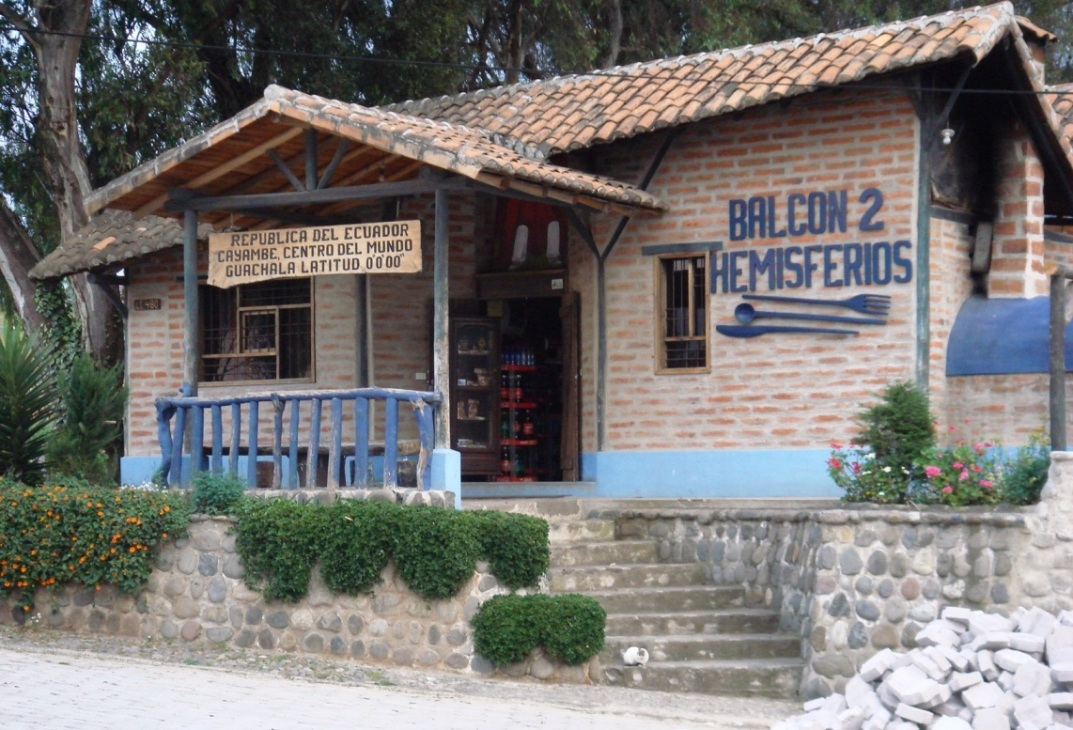
Balcon 2 Hemisferios, located on the Equator in Cayambe, Ecuador.

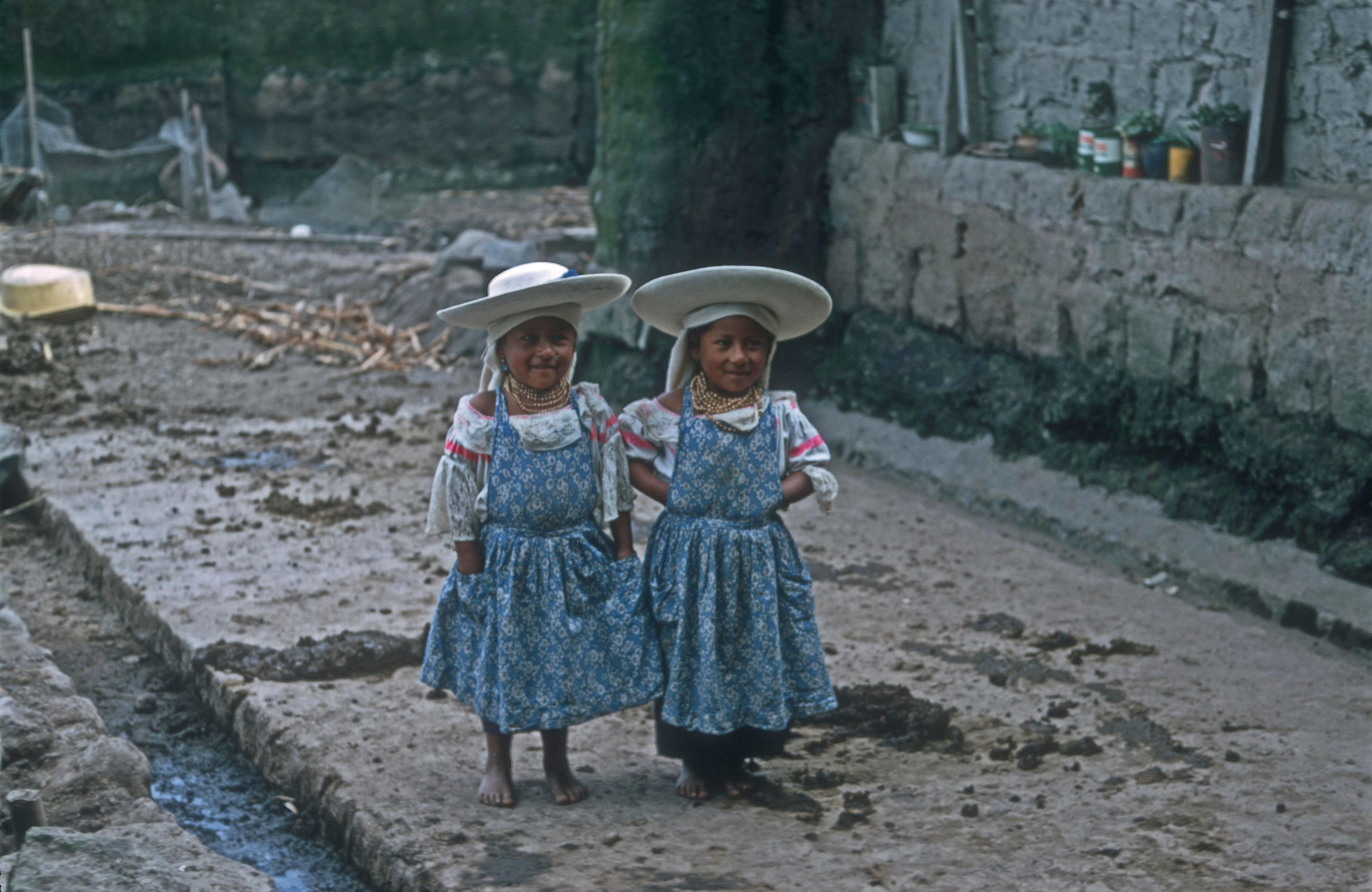
Two Otavalo girls in Cayambe.

== See also ==
- Quitsato Sundial
- Dolores Cacuango, indigenous activist from Cayambe
