= Coca River =

River of Ecuador

Coordinates: 0.4694°S 76.9742°W

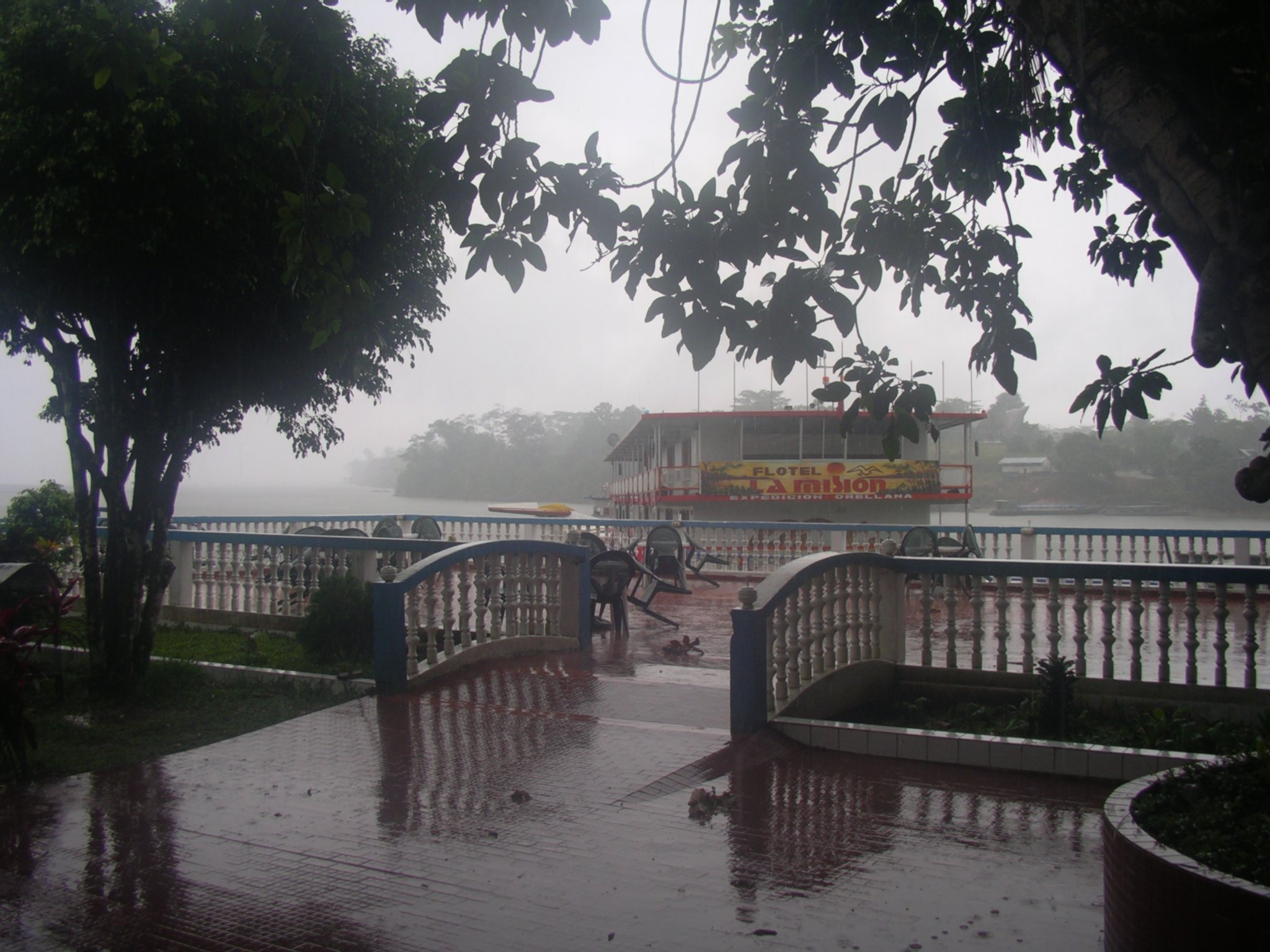
- Río Coca in Puerto Francisco de Orellana

Location
- Country: Ecuador

Physical characteristics
- Mouth
  - location: Napo River

The Coca River is a river in eastern Ecuador. It is a tributary of the Napo River. The two rivers join in the city of Puerto Francisco de Orellana. The Payamino River also merges into the Napo River in the city, but at a point about 1.5 km (0.93 mi) upstream from the Coca–Napo confluence.

Over several months, from June 2019 to February 2020, a large sinkhole formed just upstream of the famous waterfall, San Rafael Falls, the tallest in Ecuador. Due to the sinkhole, the river rerouted itself on February 2, 2020, undercutting the lava dam and triggering major retrogressive erosion. The erosion continues to migrate upstream, eating into the riverbed and valley walls, and can potentially threaten the country’s largest hydroelectric dam 10 kilometers upstream the present erosion front.

== See also ==
- San Rafael Falls
