= Reventador =

Active volcano in Ecuador

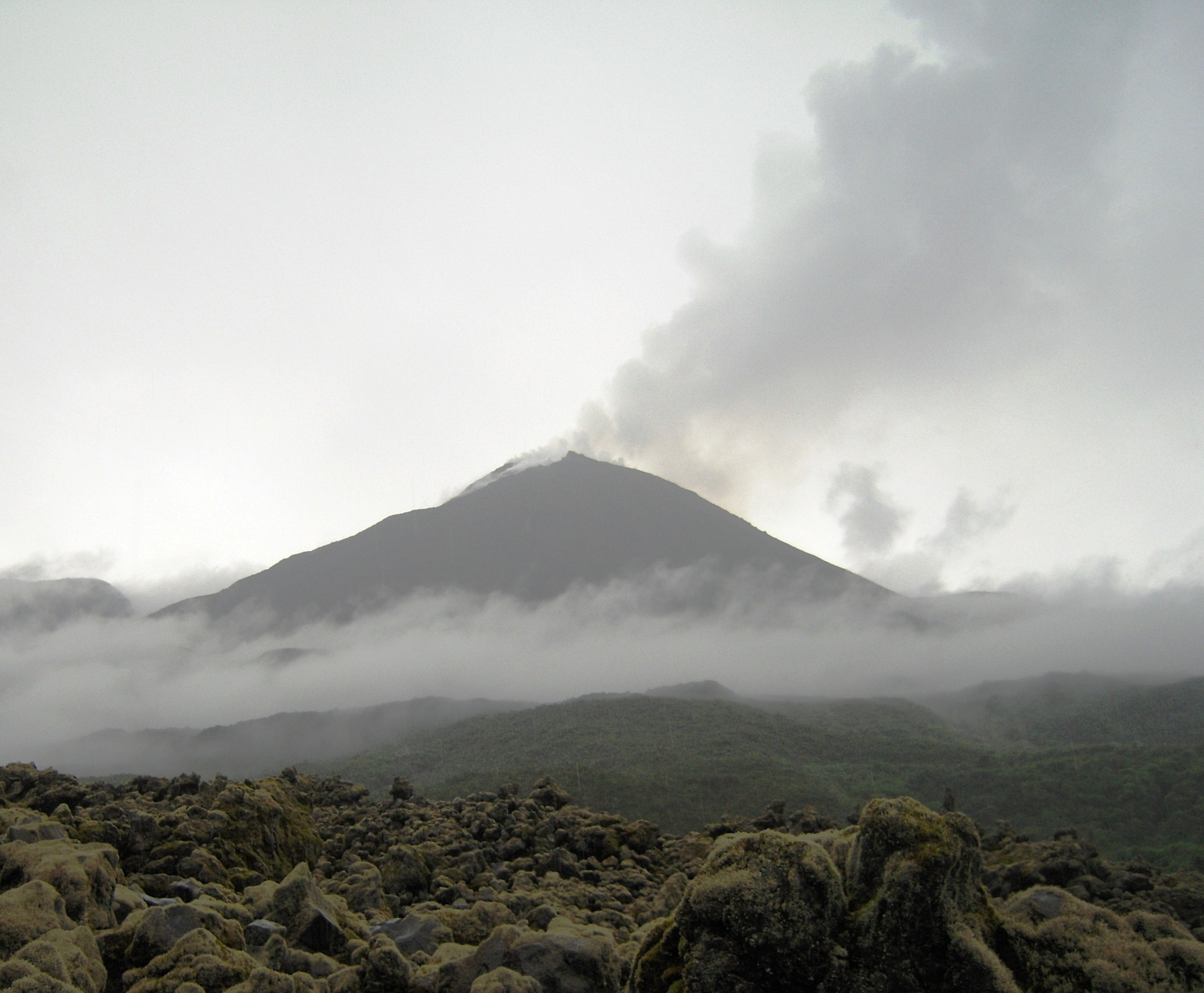
- Cone of Reventador in 2012 (V. Scherrer)

Highest point
- Elevation: 3,562 m (11,686 ft)
- Prominence: 1,086 m (3,563 ft)
- Coordinates: 0°4′39″S 77°39′21″W

Naming
- English translation: Exploder
- Language of name: Spanish

Geography
- Location within Ecuador
- Location: Ecuador
- Parent range: Andes

Geology
- Mountain type: Stratovolcano (active)
- Volcanic zone: North Volcanic Zone
- Last eruption: October 1, 2024 (ongoing)

Reventador is an active stratovolcano which lies in the eastern Andes of Ecuador. It lies in a remote area of the national park of the same name, which is Spanish for "exploder". Since 1541, it has erupted over 25 times, although its isolated location means that many of its eruptions have gone unreported.

The largest historical eruption occurred in 2002. During that eruption, the plume from the volcano reached a height of 17 kilometres (11 mi) and pyroclastic flows proceeded to 7 kilometres (4.3 mi) from the cone. On March 30, 2007, the mountain ejected ash to a height of about 3.2 kilometres (2.0 mi). No injuries or damage were reported. Its most recent eruption began on 27 July 2008, and it has remained in continuing eruption status (intermittent eruptive events without a break of 3 months or more) as of September 2026, with eruptive activity continuing at a high level and the alert level at orange.

Reventador is part of a chain of volcanoes in the Cordillera Real, much further east than the main volcanic axis of the region. The volcano rises above the jungles of the western Amazon basin and the flanks are densely clad in forests. The volcano has a caldera that is 4 km (2.5 mi) across; there is a wide gap in the caldera wall to the east, formed by a collapse of the structure. There is an unvegetated stratovolcano rising about 1,300 m (4,265 ft) from inside the caldera, and this is the main seat of current volcanic activity. The lavas are andesitic.

Reventador is one of the most active volcanoes in Ecuador. In 2020, there were near daily emissions of clouds of ash rising one or two kilometres into the air, occasional crater incandescence, and frequent avalanches of incandescent blocks.

Major volcanoes in Ecuador

== See also ==
- List of volcanoes in Ecuador
- List of stratovolcanoes
