= Cayambe (volcano) =

Volcanic mountain in Ecuador

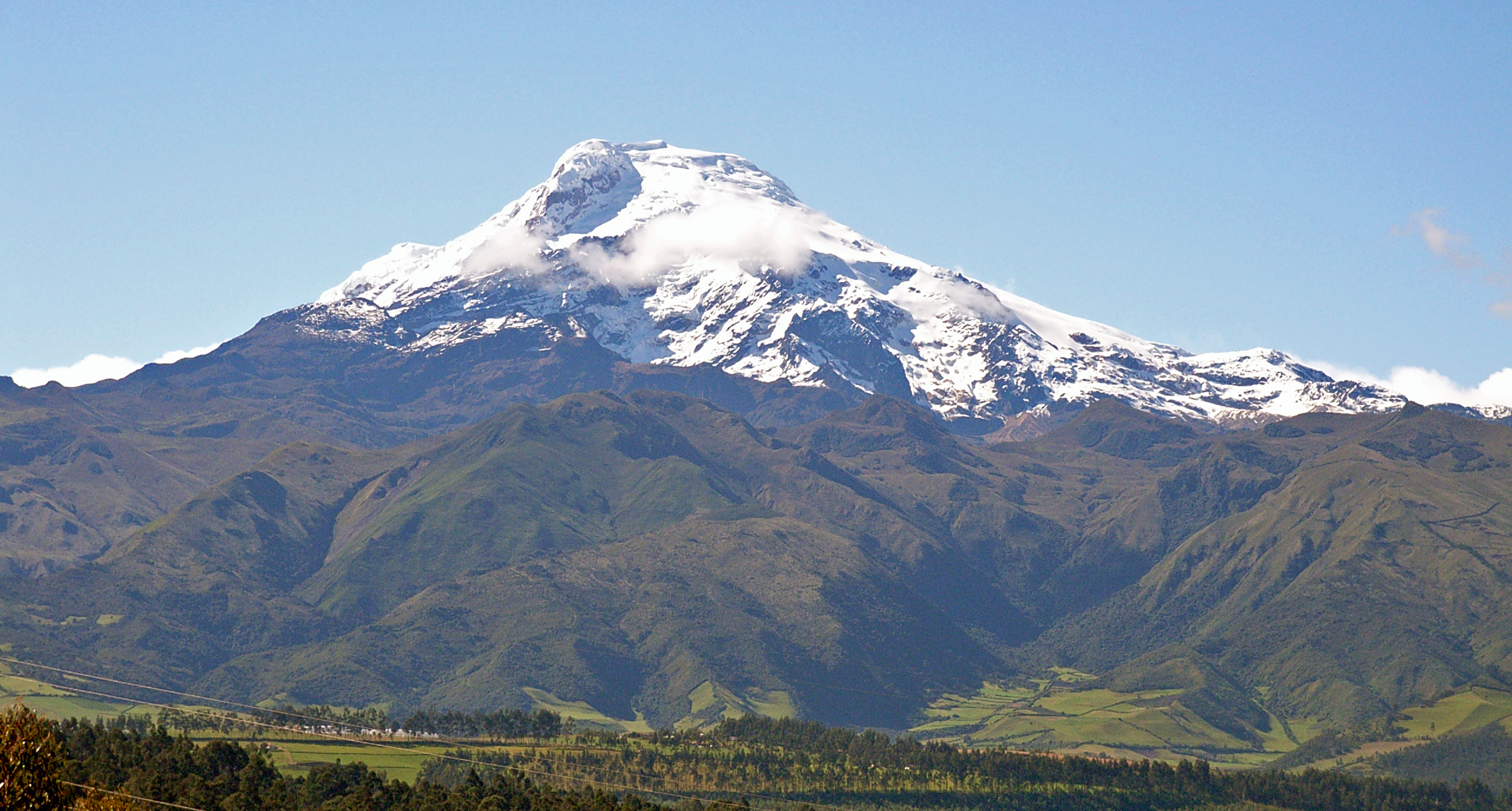
- North face of the Cayambe volcano

Highest point
- Elevation: 5,790 m (18,996 ft)
- Prominence: 2,075 m (6,808 ft)
- Listing: Ultra
- Coordinates: 0°1′30″N 77°59′20″W

Geography
- Location: Pichincha, Ecuador
- Parent range: Andes

Geology
- Mountain type: Complex volcano
- Volcanic zone: North Volcanic Zone
- Last eruption: 1785 to 1786

Climbing
- First ascent: 1880 by Edward Whymper
- Easiest route: rock/snow climb

Cayambe or Volcán Cayambe is a volcano in Ecuador, in the Cordillera Central, a range of the Ecuadorian Andes. It is located in Pichincha Province, some 70 km (43 mi) northeast of Quito. It is the third-highest mountain in Ecuador, at an elevation of 5,790 m (18,996 ft) above sea level.

Cayambe, which has a permanent snow cap, is a Holocene compound volcano which last erupted in March 1786. At 4,690 metres (15,387 ft), its south slope is the highest point in the world crossed by the Equator, and the only point on the Equator with snow cover. The ice cap covers an area of about 22 km^{2} (8 mi^{2}) and there are glaciers on the eastern flank descending to about 4,400 m (14,400 ft), whereas those on the drier western flank reach about 4,700 m (15,400 ft). The volcano and most of its slopes are within the Cayambe Coca Ecological Reserve.

Cayambe was first climbed by British adventurer Edward Whymper and his two Italian guides and companions Jean-Antoine Carrel and Louis Carrel in 1880. They made first ascents of most of the volcanoes in Ecuador. Cayambe remains a favorite of mountaineers today. The main route runs through a much-fissured terrain of moderate inclination, and only in its final part does the slope increase to 45°. There is a formidable bergschrund to cross at about 5,500 m (18,000 ft). On the final stages, there are many cracks and seracs to be overcome, and there are extensive views from the summit.

Cayambe was considered especially beautiful by Alexander von Humboldt, whose writings in turn inspired Frederic Edwin Church to paint the peak, setting the stage for his painting The Heart of the Andes.

While Everest is Earth's highest elevation (green) and Mauna Kea is tallest from its base (orange), Cayambe is farthest from Earth's axis (pink) and Chimborazo is farthest from Earth's centre (blue). Not to scale

Cayambe's peak is the point of Earth's surface farthest from its axis; thus, it rotates the fastest as Earth spins.

Major volcanoes in Ecuador

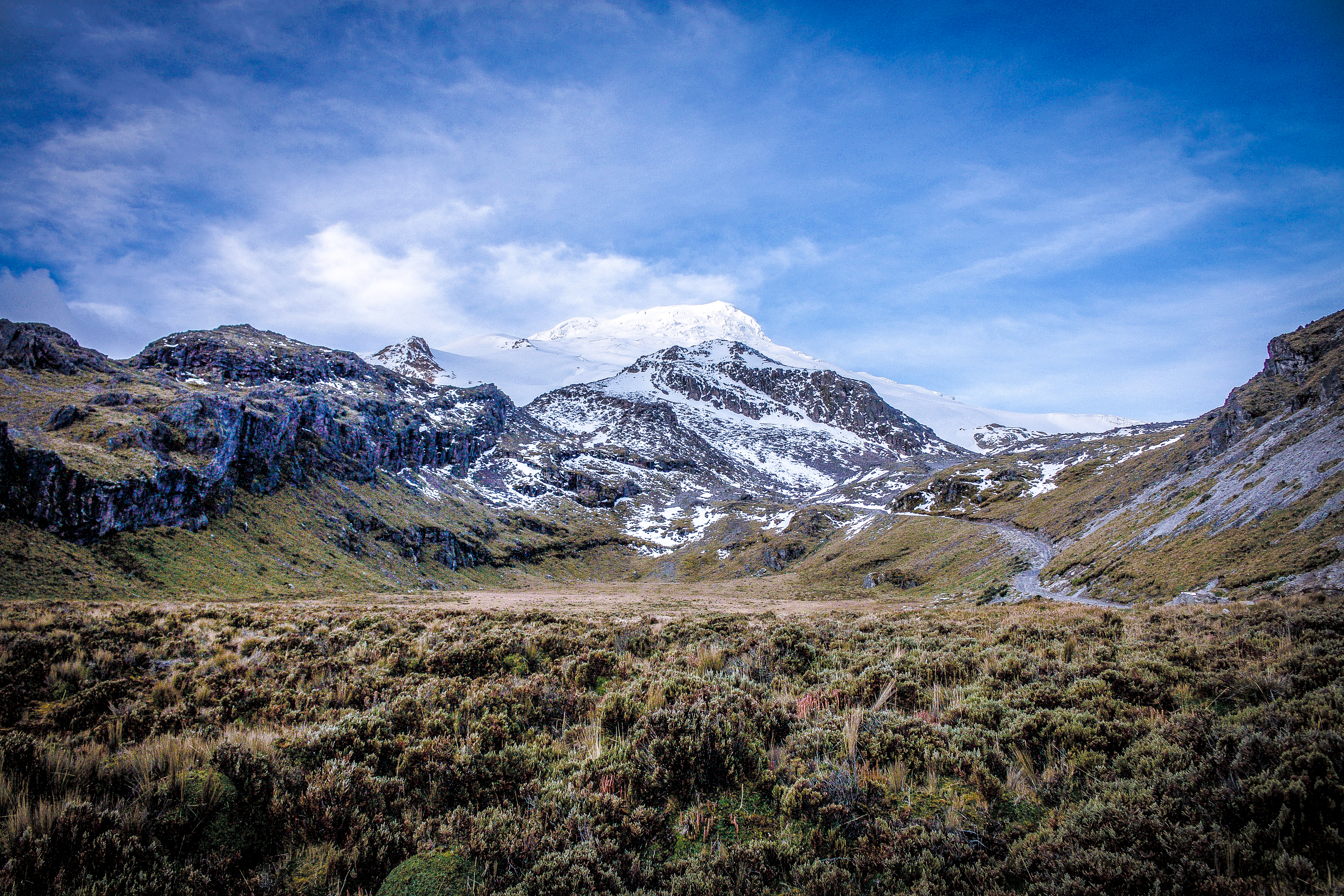
Cayambe Volcano in 2017

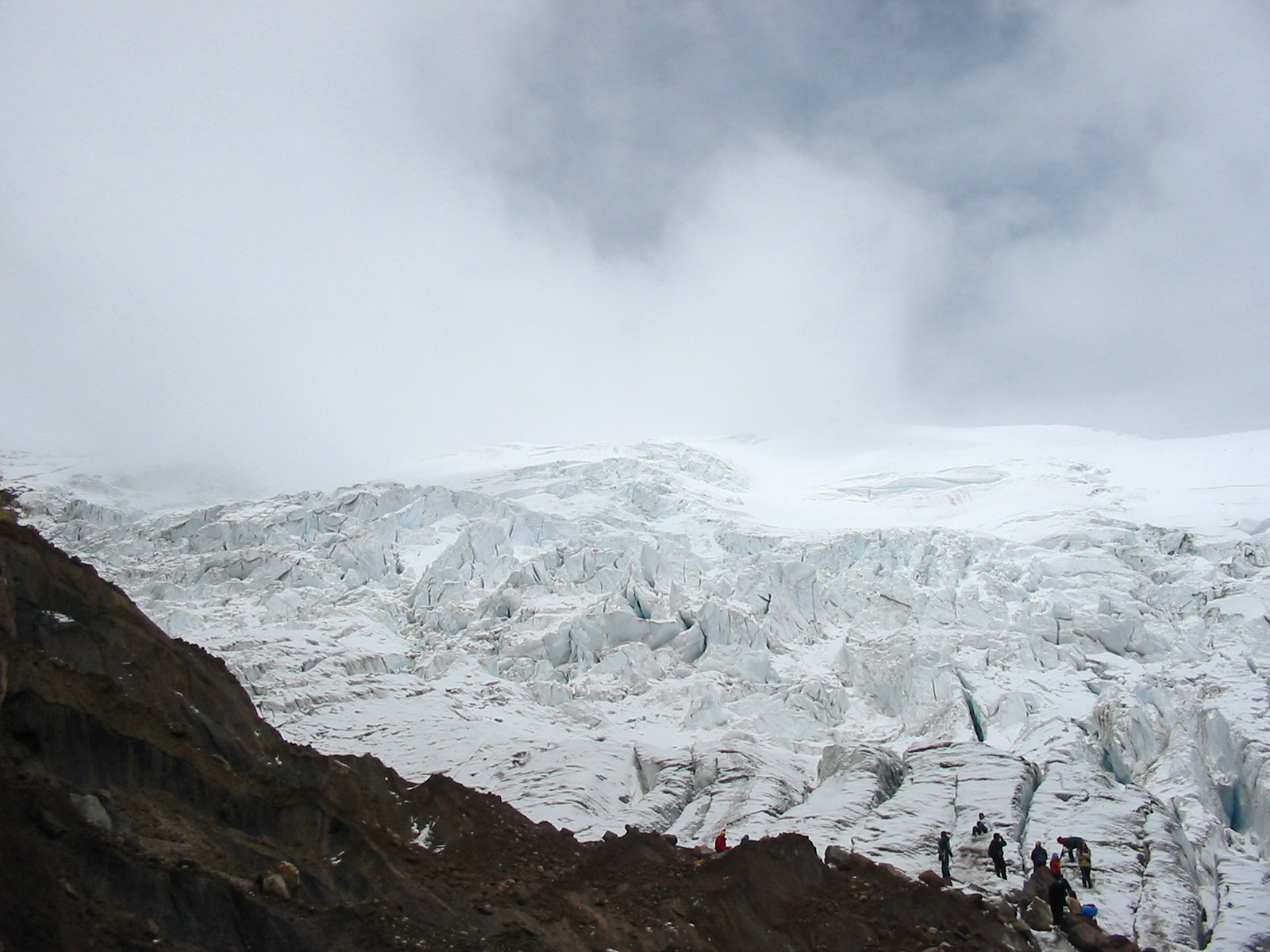
Climbers on Cayambe

== See also ==
- Lists of volcanoes
  - List of volcanoes in Ecuador
