= Pre-Columbian Ecuador =

Ecuador before Spanish colonization

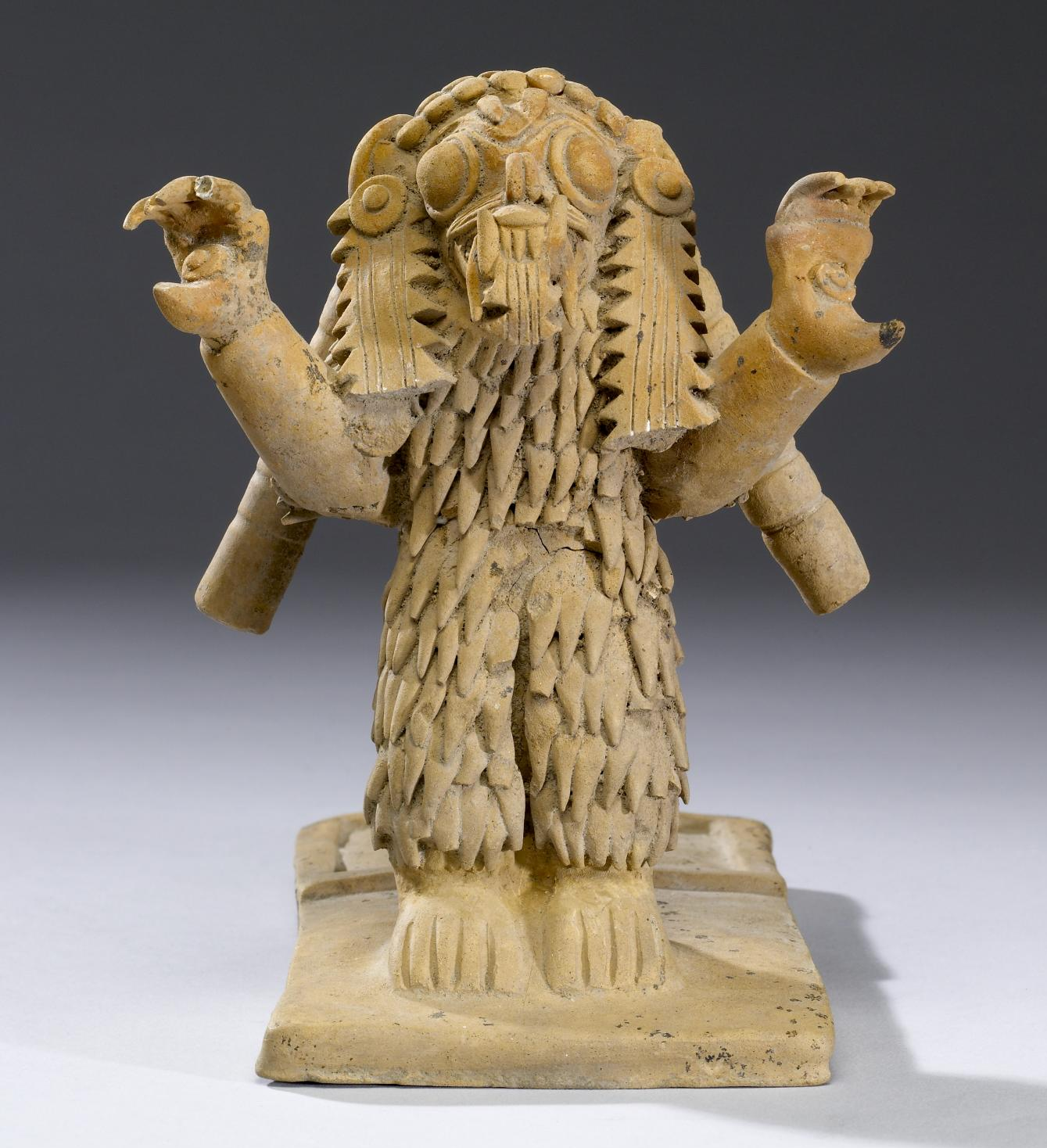
Jama-Coaque figurine, 300 BC-AD 600.

Pre-Columbian Ecuador included numerous indigenous cultures, who thrived for thousands of years before the ascent of the Incan Empire. The Las Vegas culture of coastal Ecuador that flourished between 8000 and 4600 BC, is one of the oldest cultures in the Americas. The subsequent Valdivia culture in the Pacific coast region is another well-known early Ecuadorian culture. Ancient Valdivian artifacts from as early as 3500 BC have been found along the coast north of the Santa Elena Province.

Several other cultures, including the Cotocollaos, Quitus, Caras, Paltas and Cañaris, emerged in other parts of Ecuador. There are other major archaeological sites in the coastal provinces of Manabí and Esmeraldas and in the middle Andean highland provinces of Tungurahua and Chimborazo. The archaeological evidence has established that Ecuador was inhabited for at least 4,500 years before the rise of the Inca.

Great tracts of Ecuador, including almost all of the Oriente (Amazon rainforest), remain unknown to archaeologists, a fact that adds credence to the possibility of early human habitation. Scholars have studied the Amazon region recently but the forest is so remote and dense that it takes years for research teams to survey even a small area. Their belief that the river basin had complex cultures is confirmed by the recent discovery of the Mayo-Chinchipe Cultural Complex in the Zamora-Chinchipe Province.

The present Republic of Ecuador is at the heart of the region where a variety of civilizations developed for millennia. During the pre-Inca period people lived in clans, which formed great tribes, and some allied with each other to form powerful confederations, as the Confederation of Quito. But none of these confederations could resist the formidable momentum of the Tawantinsuyu. The invasion of the Inca in the 15th century was very painful and bloody. However, once occupied by the Quito hosts of Huayna Capac, the Incas developed an extensive administration and began the colonization of the region.

The pre-Columbian era can be divided up into four eras:

- Preceramic Period;
- Formative Period;
- Period of Regional Development; and
- Period of Integration and the Arrival of the Incas.

== Preceramic period ==
The preceramic period begins with the first human settlement at the end of the last glacial and continues until around 4200 BC. The Las Vegas and Inga cultures dominated this period.

=== Las Vegas culture ===
The Las Vegas is the first known culture in Ecuador. They lived on the Santa Elena Peninsula on the coast of Ecuador between 9000 and 6000 BC. The skeletal remains and other finds show evidence the culture once flourished in the area. Scientists have classified three phases of cultural development. The earliest people were hunter-gatherers and fishermen. At approximately 6000 BC, the culture was among the first to begin farming (bottle gourd, Lagenaria siceraria, and an early type of maize, Zea mays L.) The best known remains of the culture are The Lovers of Sumpa. These human remains and other items can be seen at Museo Los Amantes de Sumpa y Centro Cultural in Santa Elena.

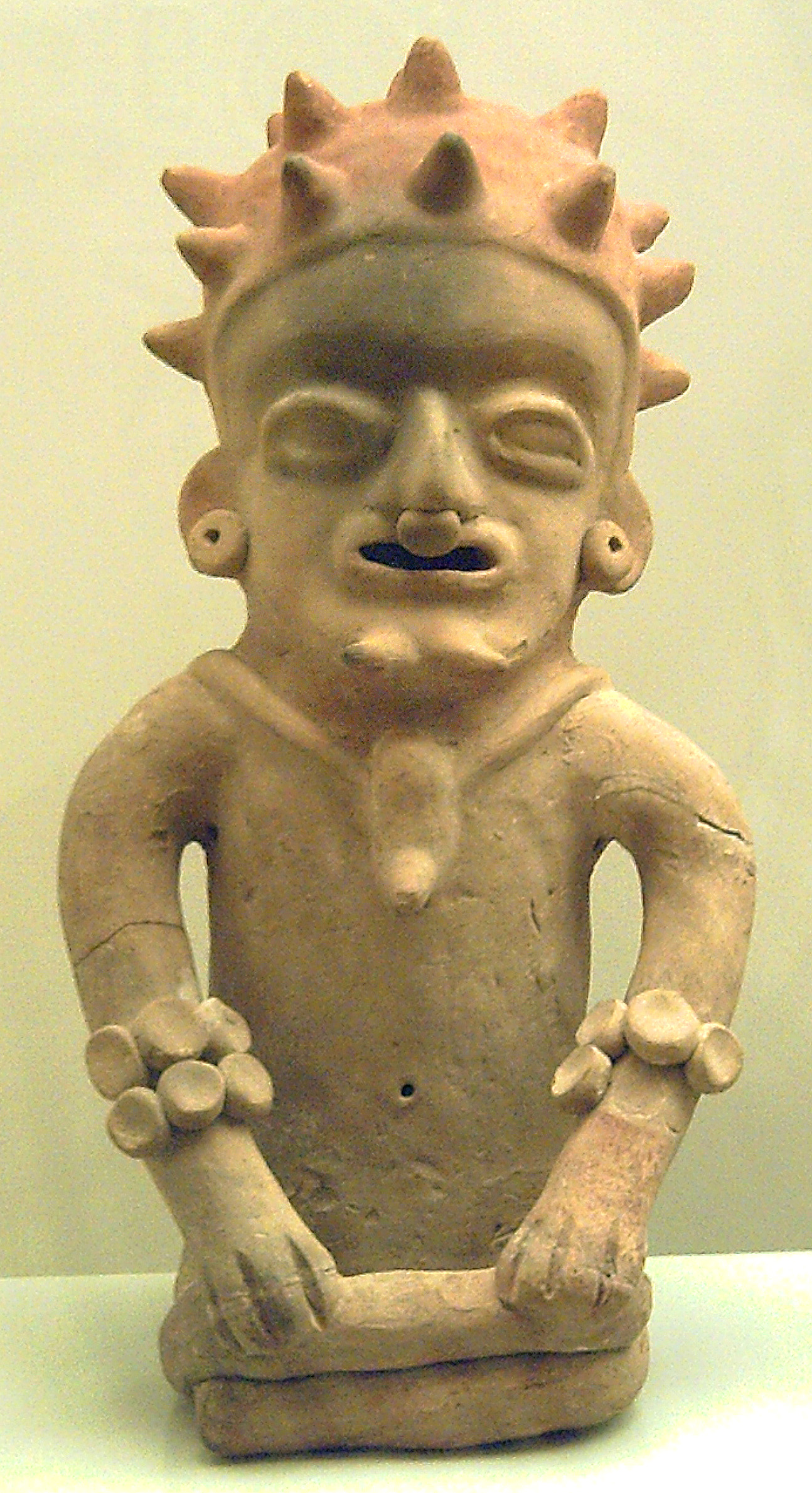
Ceramic male figure representing a richly bejeweled nobleman, from Ecuador. Bahía Culture artwork (500 BC– AD 500)

=== El Inga ===
The Inga lived in the Sierra near present-day Quito. Evidence from the archeological site El Inca date the culture to 9000–8000 BCE. Several sites were excavated around 1961. It is estimated this area is one of the most important in South America and existed along an ancient trade route. The tools used by these early nomadic hunters have provided relationships to the Clovis culture level I at Fell's Cave in southern Chile, and technological relationships to the late Pleistocene "fluted point" complexes of North America.

== Formative Period ==
During the Formative Period, people of the region moved from hunting-gathering and simple farming into a more developed society, with permanent developments, an increase in agriculture and the use of ceramics. New cultures included the Machalilla culture, Valdivia, Chorrera culture on the coast; Cotocollao, and The Chimba in the Sierra; and Mayo Chinchipe (4500 BC — AD 1532), Pastaza, Chiguaza and many others in the Oriente region. The Cerro Narrío or Chaullabamba culture thrived from 2000 BC to AD 600 in the southern Cañar and Azuay provinces.

Santa Ana (La Florida) is an important archaeological site in the highlands of Ecuador, going back as early as 3,500 BC. It is located in the Zamora-Chinchipe Province, and was discovered in 21st century. It belongs to the proposed Mayo Chinchipe-Marañón culture.

=== Valdivia Culture ===
The Valdivia culture is the first culture where significant remains have been discovered. Their civilization dates back as early as 3500 BC. Living in the area near The Valdivias were the first Americans to use pottery. They created bowls, jars and female statues out of clay, both for everyday life and for use in religious ceremonies. They navigated the seas on rafts with sails and established a trade network with tribes in the Andes and the Amazon. Valdivia art and artifacts have been found throughout the country. An extensive collection is on display at the National Museum of Ecuador in Quito and the UEES in Guayaquil.

=== Machalilla Culture ===
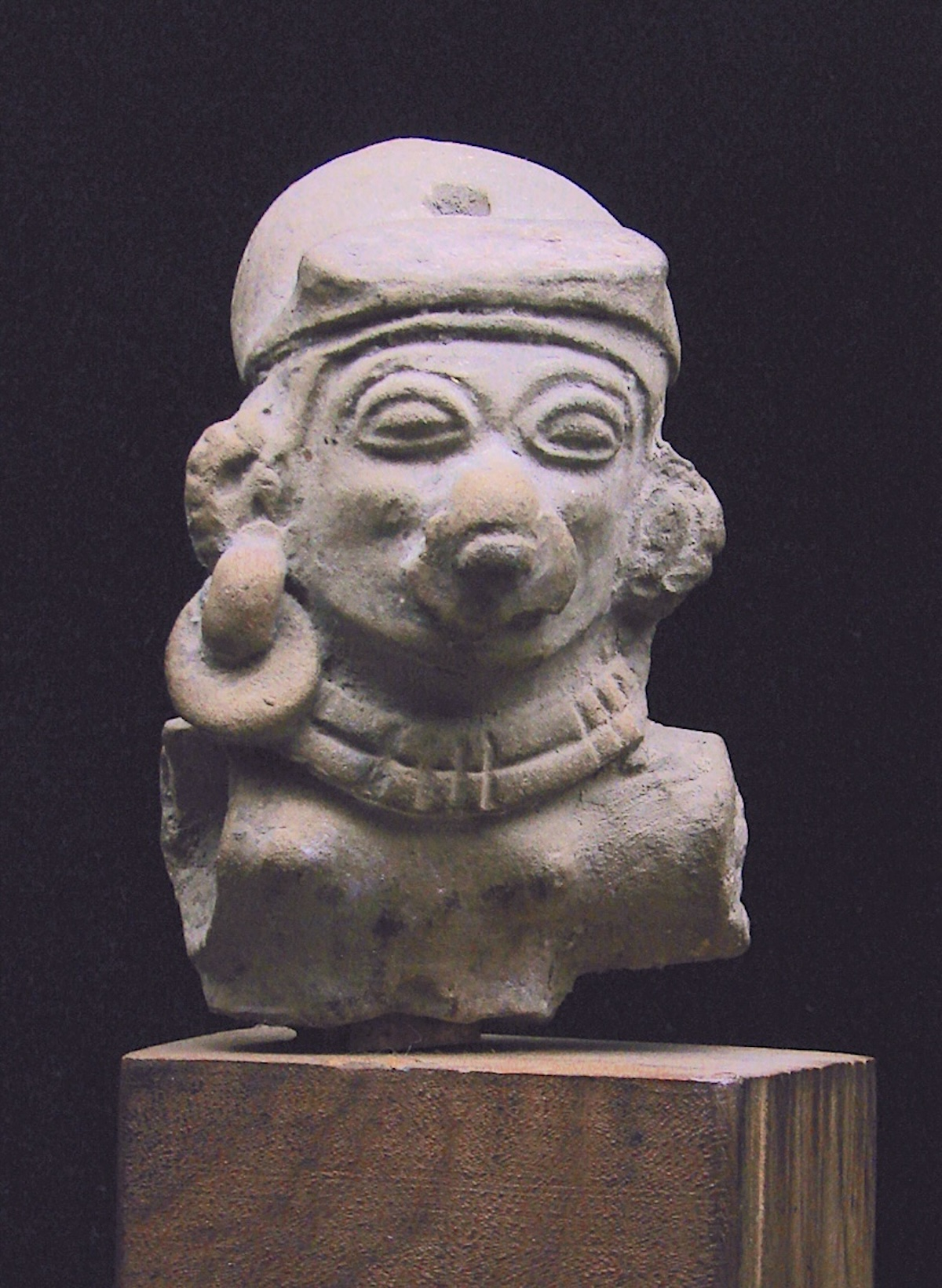
Statue from Chorrera Culture (1800—300 BC)

Succeeding the Valdivia, the Machalilla Culture was a farming culture that throve along the coast of Ecuador between the 2nd and 1st millennia BCE. Its ceramics are easily differentiated from the Valdivia as they were painted black or white with red stripes, and figurines were rare and crudely made. These appear to be the earliest people to cultivate maize in this part of South America.

=== Chorrera Culture ===
Existing in the late Formative period, the Chorrera culture lived in the Andes and Coastal Regions of Ecuador between 900 and 300 BC. They were best known for their hollow ceramic animal- and plant-shaped figurines.

== Period of Regional Development ==
The period of Regional Development is when regional differences developed in the territorial or political and social organization of the peoples. Among the main towns of this period were the cultures: Jambelí, Guangala, Bahía, Tejar-Daule, La Tolita, Jama Coaque in the coast of Ecuador, in the Sierras the Cerro Narrío Alausí; and in the Ecuadorian Amazon jungle the Tayos.

=== La Bahía ===
The figurine of the Bahía culture (300 BC– AD 500), La Chimba is the site of the earliest ceramic northern Andes, north of Quito, and is representative of the Formative Period in its final stage. Its inhabitants contacted several villages on the coast and the mountains, keeping close proximity to the Cotocollao, located on the plateau of Quito and its surrounding valleys. The Bahia culture occupied the area that stretches from the foothills of the Andes to the Pacific Ocean, and from Bahía de Caráquez, to the south of Manabi. The Jama-Coaque culture inhabited areas between Cabo San Francisco in Esmeraldas, to Bahía de Caráquez, in Manabi, in an area of wooded hills and vast beaches of their immigrant who facilitated the gathering of resources of both the jungle and the ocean.

=== Tuncahuán ===
The Tuncahuán phase culture flourished in the central highlands of Ecuador and is believed to be traced back to 500 BCE to 500 CE. There has been very little archaeological research in this region of Ecuador and we still have much to learn from its prehistory. The first to describe Tuncahuán phase was the Ecuadorian archaeologist Jacinto Caamano Jijón and early twentieth century, based on its investigation five graves in a cemetery.

=== La Tolita Culture ===
The La Tolita developed in the coastal region of Southern Colombia and Northern Ecuador between 600 BCE and CE 200. Numerous archaeological sites have been discovered that show the highly artistic nature of this culture. Artifacts are characterized by gold jewelry, beautiful anthropomorphic masks and figurines that reflect a hierarchical society with complex ceremonies.

=== Upano River valley ===
A cluster of cities emerged in eastern Ecuador's Upano River valley between 500 BC and 600 AD. Though the culture of these cities' inhabitants is not yet well understood, it is thought that tens of thousands of people resided in the region at its height.

=== Guangala ===
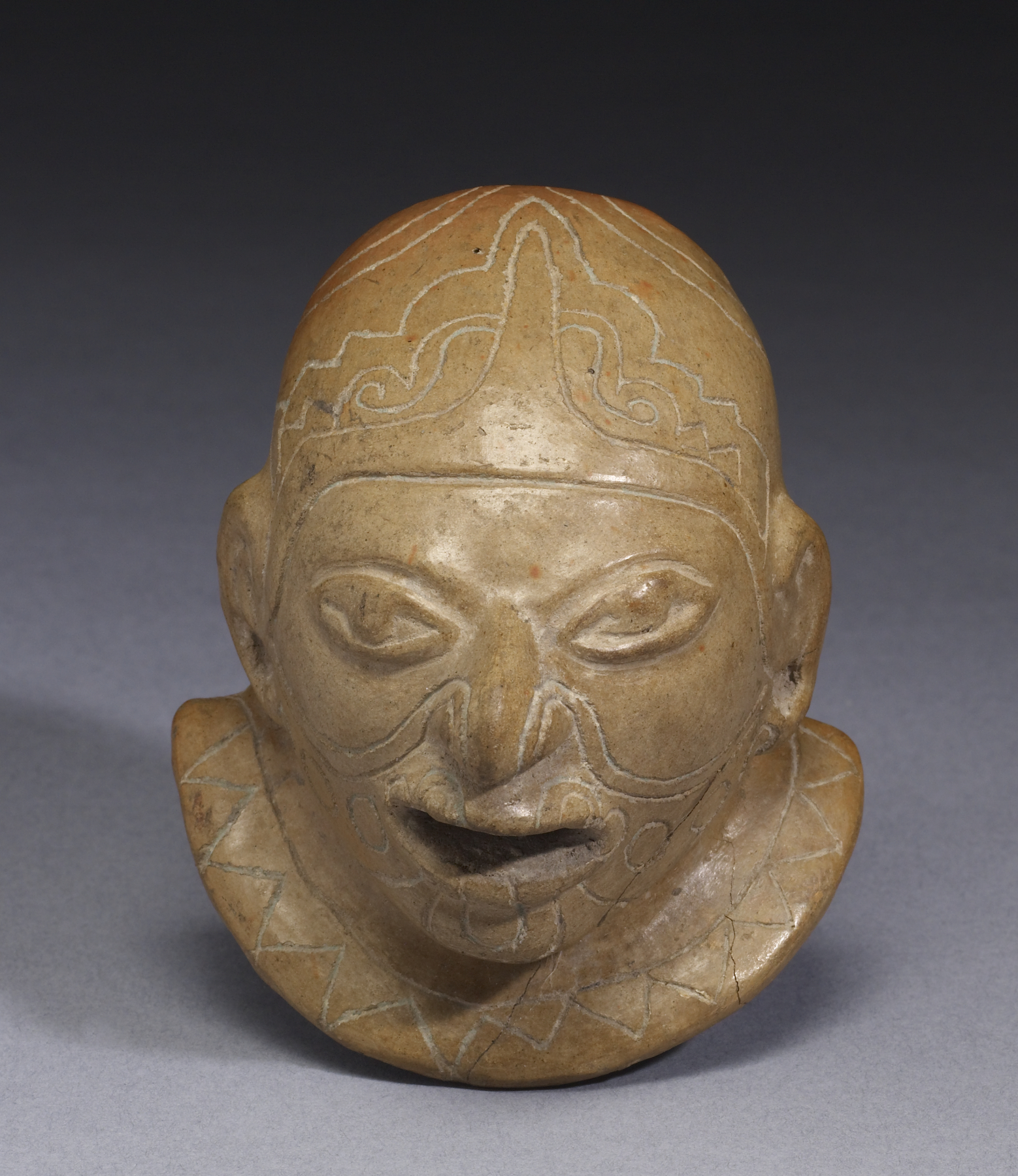
Guangala Head in Walters Art Museum.

The Guangala culture thrived from AD 100 to 800 in the Manabí Province.

== Period of Integration and the arrival of the Inca ==
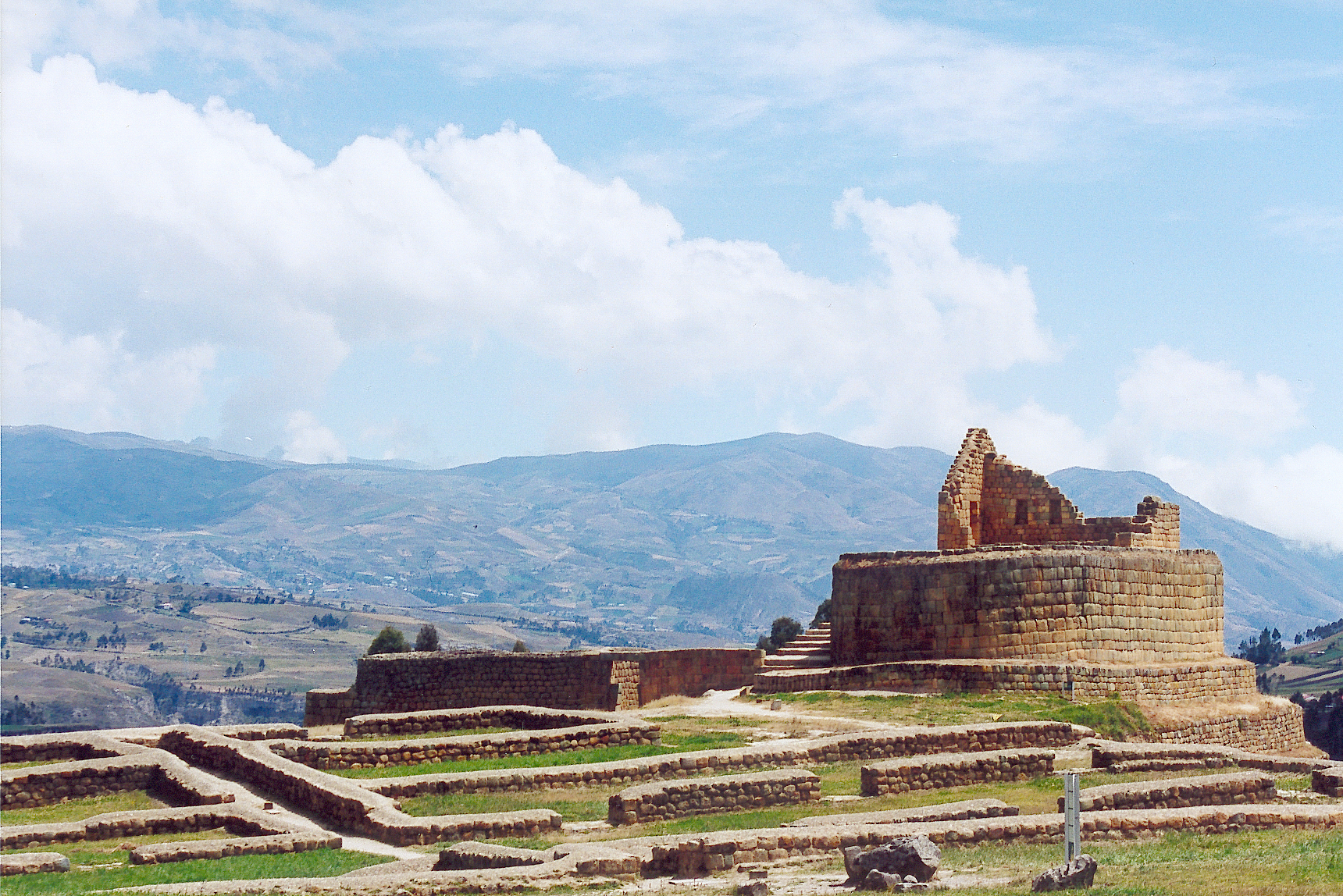
Ingapirca Ruins near Cuenca

Tribes throughout Ecuador integrated during this period. They built better housing that allowed them to improve their living conditions and no longer be subject to the climate. In the mountains the Cosangua-Píllaro, Capulí and Piartal-Tuza cultures arose; in the eastern region was the Yasuní Phase, while the Milagro, Manteña and Huancavilca cultures developed on the coast, from 500 BC onwards.

=== Los Manteños ===
The Manteños were the last of the pre-Columbian cultures in the coastal region and flourished between 600 and 1534. They were the first to witness the arrival of Spanish ships sailing in the surrounding Pacific Ocean. According to archaeological evidence and Spanish chronicles, the civilization extended from Bahía de Caráquez to Cerro de Hojas in the south. They were excellent weavers, produced textiles, articles of gold, silver spondylus shells and mother of pearls. The manteños mastered the seas and forged extensive trade routes as far as present-day Chile to the south and western Mexico to the north. The center of the culture was in the area of Manta, named in their honor.

=== Los Huancavilcas ===
The Huancavilcas constitute the most important pre-Columbian culture of Guayas, after Las Vegas. These warriors were noted for their appearance. Huancavilca culture recounts the legend of Guayas and Quiles, for which the city of Guayaquil was named.

=== The Incas ===
The Inca expansion northward from modern-day Peru during the late 15th century met with fierce resistance by several Ecuadorian tribes, particularly the Cañari, in the region around modern-day Cuenca, who fought along with the Quitu, occupants of the site of the modern capital; the Cara (originally of Manabi) in the Sierra north of Quito. The conquest of Ecuador began in 1463 under the leadership of the ninth Inca, the great warrior Pachacuti Inca Yupanqui. In that year, his son Tupac took over command of the army and began his march northward through the Sierra.

By 1500 Tupac's son, Huayna Capac, overcame the resistance of these populations and that of the Cara, and thus incorporated most of modern-day Ecuador into Tawantinsuyu, as the Inca empire was known. Different tribes also sought refugee in the then thick interior jungles. The influence of these conquerors based in Cuzco (modern-day Peru) was limited to about a half century, or less in some parts of Ecuador. During that period, some aspects of life remained unchanged. Traditional religious beliefs, for example, persisted throughout the period of Inca rule. In other areas, however, such as agriculture, land tenure, and social organization, Inca rule had a profound effect despite its relatively short duration.

Emperor Huayna Capac became very fond of Quito, making it a secondary capital of Tawantinsuyu and living out his elder years there before his death in about 1527. Huayna Capac's sudden death from a strange disease, described by one as smallpox, precipitated a bitter power struggle between Huascar, whose mother was Coya (meaning Empress) Mama Rahua Occillo and legitimate heir, and Atahualpa, a son who was born to a Quitu princess, and reputedly his father's "favorite".

This struggle raged during the half-decade before the arrival of Francisco Pizarro's conquering expedition in 1532. The key battle of this civil war was fought on Ecuadorian soil, near Riobamba, where Huascar's northbound troops were met and defeated by Atahualpa's southbound troops. Atahualpa's final victory over Huascar in the days just before the Spanish conquerors arrived resulted in large part from the loyalty of two of Huayna Capac's best generals, who were based in Quito along with Atahualpa. The victory remains a source of national pride to Ecuadorians as a rare case when "Ecuador" forcefully bettered a "neighboring country".

== Ecuador under Incan rule ==
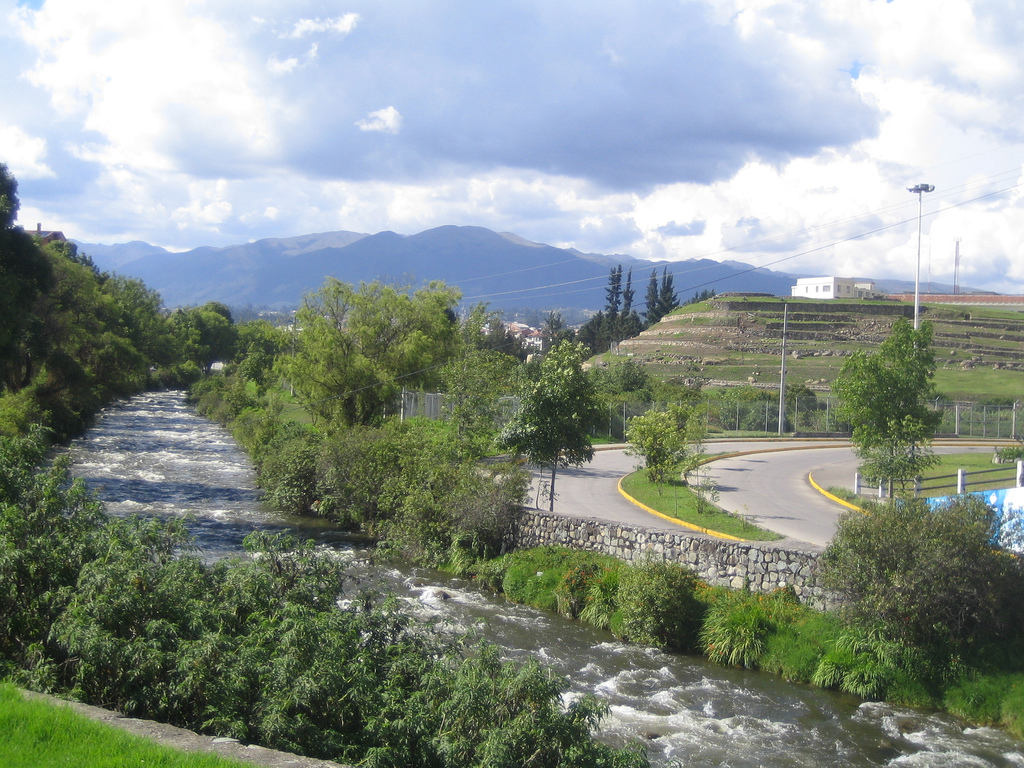
Pumapungo ruins at right, on the Tomebamba River. Tumebamba was chosen by the Emperor Huayna Capac (ruled 1493–1525) to be the Inca northern capital.

The history of Ecuador is better known from the point of the Inca expansion than during the Pre-Columbian era. In 1463, the Inca warrior Pachacuti and his son Tupac Yupanqui began the incorporation of Ecuador into Inca rule. They began by defeating the people of the Sierra including the Quitus tribe (the people for whom modern-day Quito is named). They continued by heading southwest to the coast, eventually subjugating the Ecuadorians living near the Gulf of Guayaquil and the Island of Puna to Inca rule.

By the end of the 15th century, despite fierce resistance by several Ecuadorian native tribes, Huayna Capac, Tupac Yupanqui's son with a Cañari princess (the people from modern-day Canar province), was able to conquer the remaining tribes and by 1500 most of Ecuador was incorporated into the Incan Empire loosely.

Huayna Capac grew up in Ecuador and loved the land, in contrast preference to his native Cuzco. He named Quito the second Inca capital and a road was built to connect the two capitals. Cities and temples were built throughout the country. He married a Quitu princess and remained in the country until his death. When Huayna Capac died, there was no clear successor to the thrown since the designated heir, Ninan Cuyochi, died shortly after his father.

Since neither of the brothers liked the idea of a torn empire, the two sons sought the throne. Huáscar, born of Huayna Capac's sister in Cusco, was voted as ruler by the Inca nobles. Atahualpa, born in Quito according to Juan de Velasco and Garcilaso de la Vega, and in Cusco according to the most reliable chronicles, was the favorite son of Huayna Capac and was very popular among the Inca armies stationed in the north. The brothers battled for six years, killing many men and weakening the empire. Finally in 1532 near Chimborazo, Atahualpa, with the aid of two of his father's generals, defeated his brother. Huáscar was captured and put in prison. Atahualpa became emperor of a severely weakened empire only to face the Spanish conquistadors' arrival in 1532.

During the period of Inca presence, the Ecuadorian organizations adopted agricultural practices, and a few social organization of the Inca occupants, but maintained their traditional religious beliefs and many customs.

Inca domination in Ecuador was short (around 70 years) but they left one of the best-known archaeological sites of Ecuador: Ingapirca. They tried to conquer the high Amazonian valley with only partial success, especially in the south, where the Bracamoros defeated them three times.

== Objects and artifacts ==
Edward Whymper sought Stone Age objects while in Ecuador during 1880. Most of the items he collected from those brought to him were stone; he thought that most metal artifacts had been smelted in search of any gold they contained.

=== Macanas ===
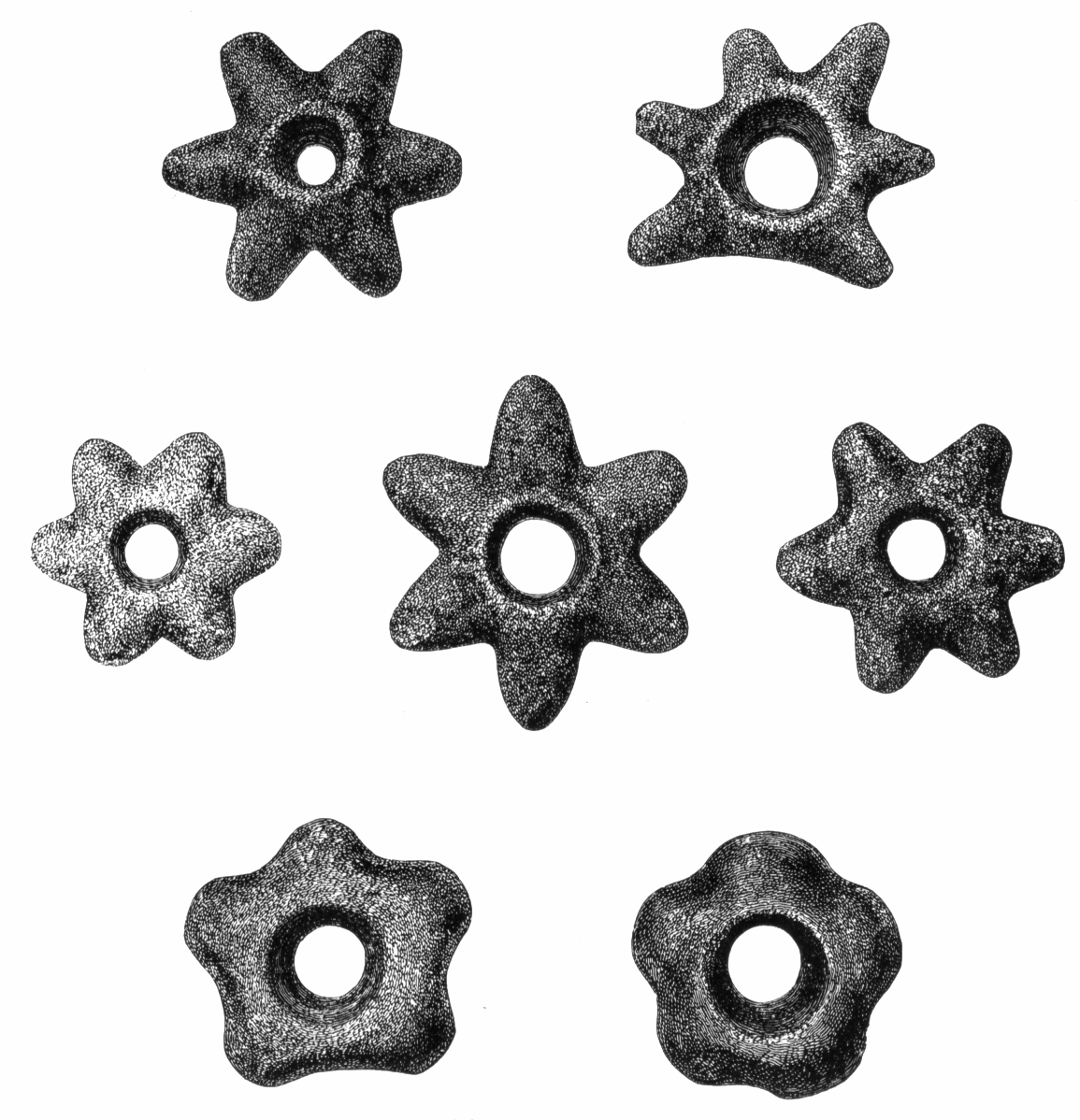
Macanas, illustraction from Edward Whymper's Travels Amongst the Great Andes of the Equator. London: John Murray, 1892.

By far the most common object was a stone star with a hole through the middle. They were found everywhere between Ibarra and Riobamba. The majority have six rays (and none have more), proceeding symmetrically from the center, and the whole are fashioned alike upon each side. A certain number have only five rays, and occasional examples are irregular in shape. All are pierced by a hole, which has been drilled from the two sides, and the size of this varies considerably. In dimensions they range from three to five inches in diameter and from three-quarters of an inch to two inches in thickness. Their weight is from five to twenty ounces. The larger part are made from basaltic rock and gabbro. Objects of this class were also cast in metal but these are now rarely found in Ecuador.

While they possess the general points of similarity that have been mentioned, scarcely any two are identical in form. Some are flat and thin, others are thick, or rise in the center upon each side into a shape like the hub of a wheel.

In a U.S. Naval expedition report, figures are given of two stars in bronze (found at Cuzco, Peru), one having a sixth ray prolonged into a hatchet, which suggests that it must have been a war-club or battle-axe. In Squire's book on Peru, there is a figure of a six-rayed object in bronze, said to have been one of several, which are designated by the author (apparently following some earlier writer) casse-têtes, and he says that among the fractured skulls that were found "the larger part seemed to have been broken by blows from some such weapons". Mons. Wiener, in his book on Peru and Bolivia gives a figure of a star and was found at Ancon (archaeological site) near Lima showing a stick inserted in the central hole; and another figure of a somewhat similar from in bronze, also handled. Like Squier, he calls them casse-têtes. Finally, the Doctors Reiss and Stübel remark, in their work upon the Peruvian antiquities obtained at Ancon, that "the few stone objects found here show but slight traces of workmanship, an exception being ... a stone weapon of the morning star type ... the six-rayed stone star, here found once only, is elsewhere in Peruvian graves by no means rare."

Though all these writers appear to regard these objects as a kind of battle-axe (and are probably correct so far as those having a ray prolonged into a hatchet are concerned), there are several considerations that suggest these objects were habitually used as weapons. The larger of the stars (which are as heavy as a pound and a quarter) no doubt might be used effectively; but the smaller ones, weighing only a few ounces, would not be very formidable; and taking them as a whole they are less adapted either for offensive or defensive purposes than most of the other stone implements. To this may be added that many are uninjured, and do not seem to have been put to any use whatever. Francisco Campaña (a half-Indian who joined the latter part of Whymper's journey) had assisted in the examination of graves in Peru, and said these stars in stone were found there placed upon the breasts of corpses; and it seems likely that they were to the Children of the Sun symbols of the luminary that they worshipped.

These weapons are known as Macana(s), used by armies of many Andean and Mesoamerican cultures during centuries until Spanish conquest. They are very effective.

=== Implements ===
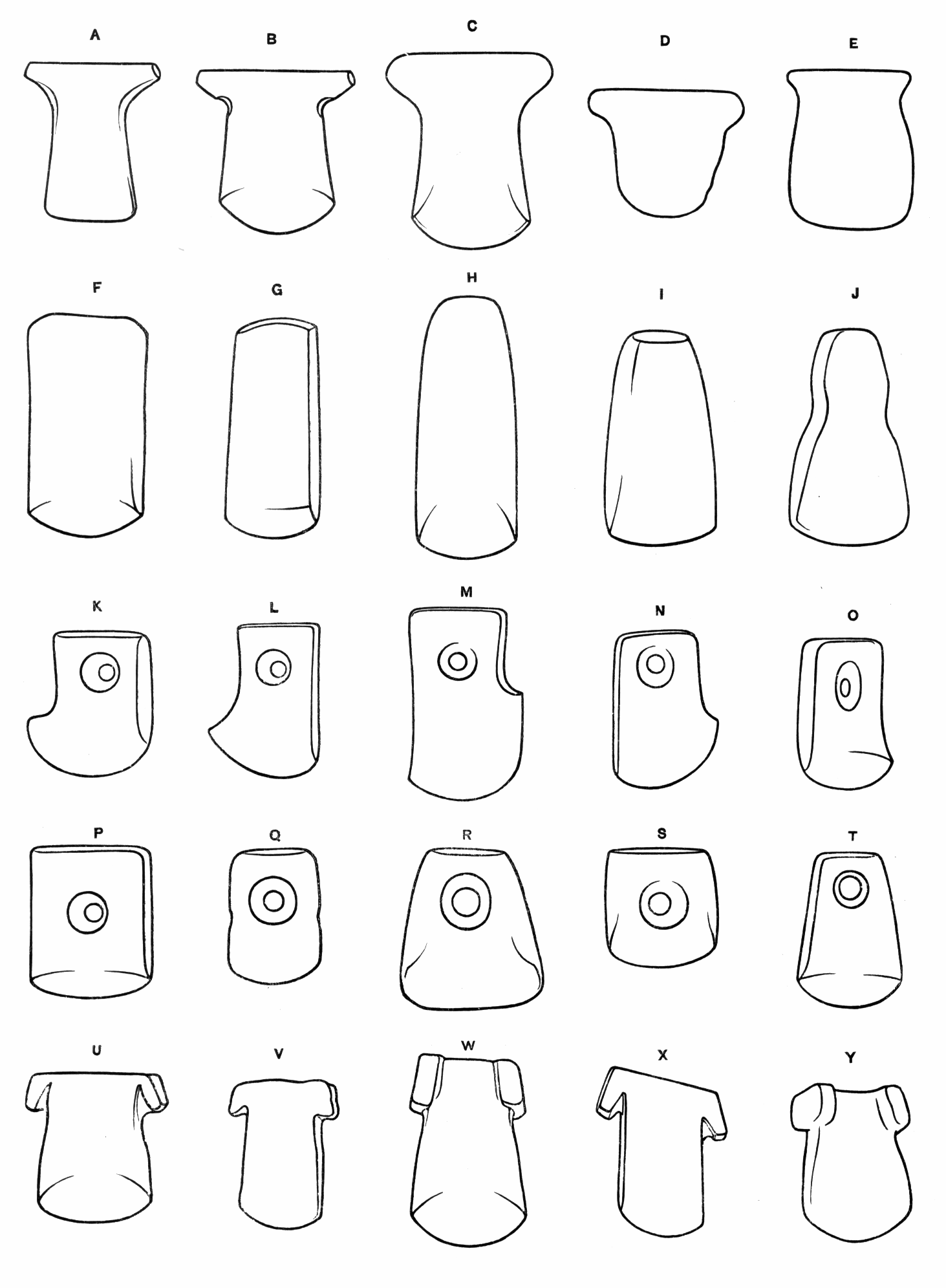
Five types of tools

A large number of stone objects were found that were undoubtedly implements.

Five types are shown in the illustration with a white background. In the top row, series A-E, the whole of the edges are rounded, except the bottom ones. In the next line (F-J) all are of a chisel type. The tops and sides of these are sometimes flat or angular, and sometimes rounded; and the lower, or cutting edges, are sharp. The examples in the next series (K-O) bear some resemblance to a bill-hook; the top edges are flat; and they are all pierced with holes drilled from the two sides. The specimens in the next row have similar holes—otherwise they approximate to the chisel type; while the type represented in the bottom series U-Y differs from all the others in having projecting shoulders, and (occasionally) in having a groove along the length of the top edge, apparently to facilitate handling.

All these five types were found in numbers, in many localities, and have evidently been among the most common and generally used implements during the Equatorial Stone Age. In minor respects they exhibit considerable variety, and there are large differences in their size, thickness, and weight. The type P-T was the most numerous. The greater part have holes drilled from each side (with the holes having less in diameter in the middle than on their surfaces), though in some the aperture is as broad internally as externally. The positions of the holes vary, some being central, although most of them are nearest to the top. The lower edge is always the sharpest; and, while many would not have cut butter, there are a few sharp enough to cut wood. Their weight ranges from 3¼ to 29 ounces, and like the stars in stone they have been fashioned from a diversity of rocks.

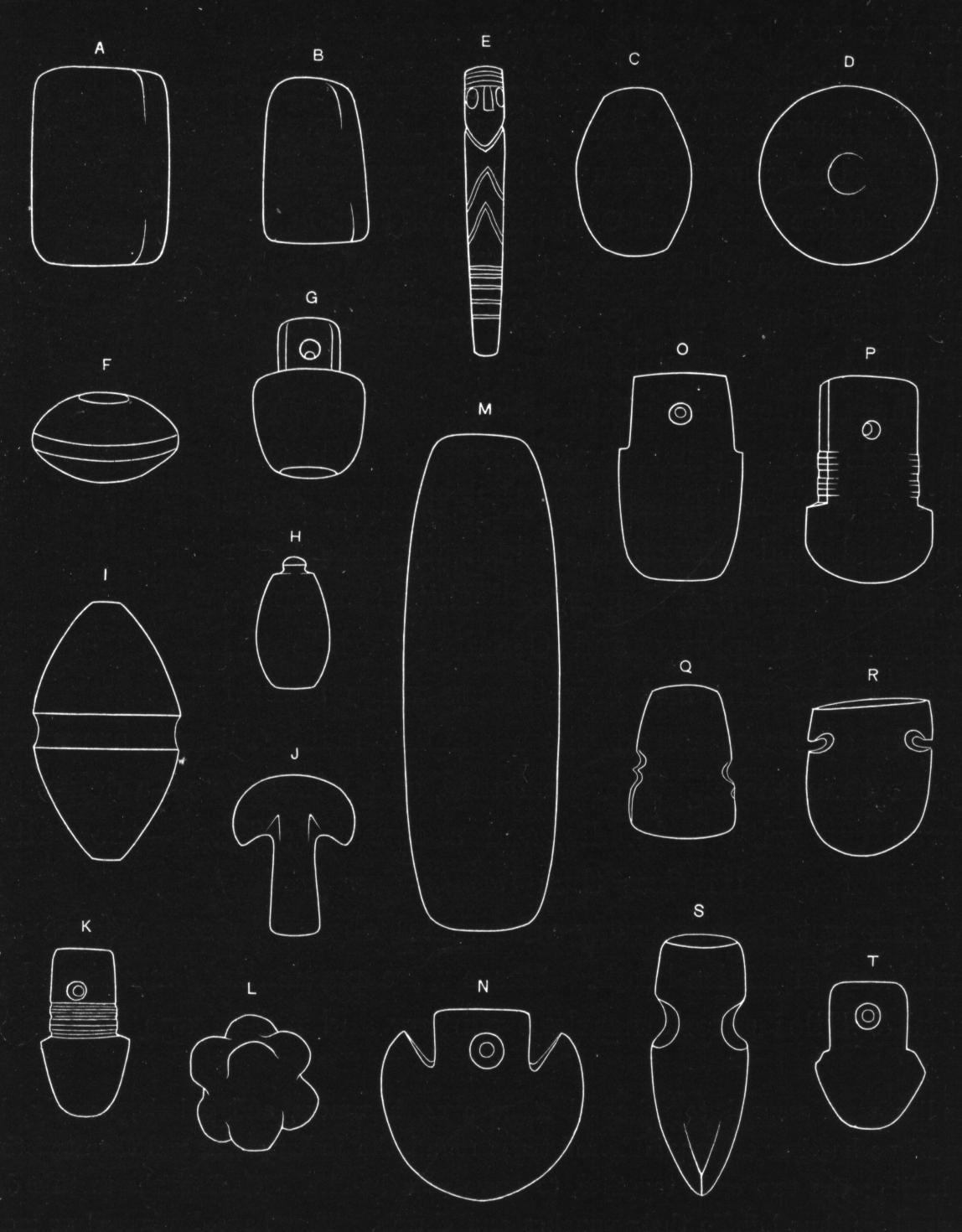
Various stone tools

A large number of implements in stone were obtained, from which selections are given in the illustration with a black background. Those marked E, J, K, L, N-T are unique, and the other forms are more or less rare. The central one, marked M, was the only object for which Ecuadorian natives could assign a use, and it was pronounced to be a corn-pounder. This one weighs five and a quarter pounds, and another of eleven pounds was obtained. Several examples of form I were found, considered by Thomas Ewbank to be a "hollowing-hammer for metal" by making a handle with a pliable wood rod. It is possible those marked A, B, and C were used for the same purpose. The objects D, F, G, and H are more puzzling. The two latter somewhat resemble the two others represented here, but differ from them in not having the circular cavities in the sides. The objects of this type are highly wrought, and fashioned out of hard stone. It seems not unlikely that they were used for sharpening tools, and that the examples G, H are unused specimens. They have also been found by M. Wiener in Peru.

Among the distinctly ornamental objects in stone there are imitations of corn cobs. These were particularly mentioned in Juan & Ulloa's work, in the mid-18th century. Spanish writers say:

"The maize has ever been the delight of the Indians; for, besides being their food, their favourite liquor chicha was made of it; the Indian artists therefore used to shew their skill in making ears of it in a kind of very hard stone; and so perfect was the resemblance that they could hardly be distinguished by the eye from nature; especially as the colour was imitated to the greatest perfection; some represented the yellow maize, some the white ... The most surprising circumstance of the whole is, the manner of their working, which, when we consider their want of instruments and the wretched form of those they had, appears an inexplicable mystery: for either they worked with copper tools, a metal little able to resist the hardness of stones, or, to give the nice polish conspicuous on their works, other stones must have been used as tools."

Squier gives in his book on Peru a bad representation of one of these stone maize-heads and says that they were specially mentioned "by Padre Arriaga in his rare book on the Extirpation of Idolatry in Peru under the name zaramama", and were household gods of the ancient inhabitants.

=== Age of objects ===
That the principal part of these objects and implements in stone are of considerable or of great age is apparent from the fact that they are scarcely mentioned at the time of the Pizarros. Garcilaso de la Vega says that the Indians

"knew not the invention of putting a handle of Wood to their Hammers, but worked with certain Instruments they had made of Copper, mixed with a sort of fine Brass. Neither did they know how to make Files or Graving-tools, or Bellows for Melting down Metals ... But above all, their Carpenters seemed to be worst provided with Tools; for though ours use many Instruments made of Iron, those of Peru had no other than a Hatchet, and a Pick-axe made of Copper; they neither had Saw, nor Augre, nor Planer, nor any other Tool for the Carpenter's work, so that they could not make Arches or Portals for doors; onely they hewed and cut their Timber, and whitened it, and then it was prepared for their Building: And for making their Hatchets and Pick-axes, and some few Rakes, they made use of the Silversmiths, for as yet they had not attained to the Art of Working in Iron. Nor did they know how to make Nails, or use them, but tied all their timber with Cords of Hemp. Nor were their Hewers of Stone more artificial, for in cutting and shaping their Stones, they had no other Tool, than one made with some sharp Flints and Pebbles, with which they rather wore out the Stone by continual rubbing, than cutting."

From this passage it appears that at the time of the Pizarros the Indians used tools of metal for most purposes. The concluding sentence evidently refers solely to fashioning stones for building. Older writers in general do not indicate that they had a cognizance of a Stone Age.

== Gallery ==
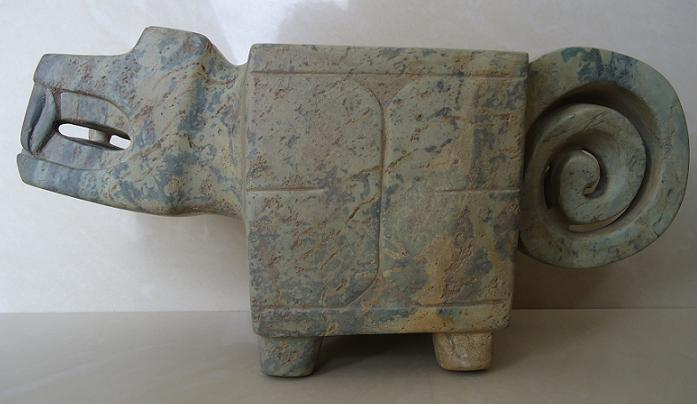
Valdivia-Machalilla jaguar mortar (c. 2000—1300 BC)

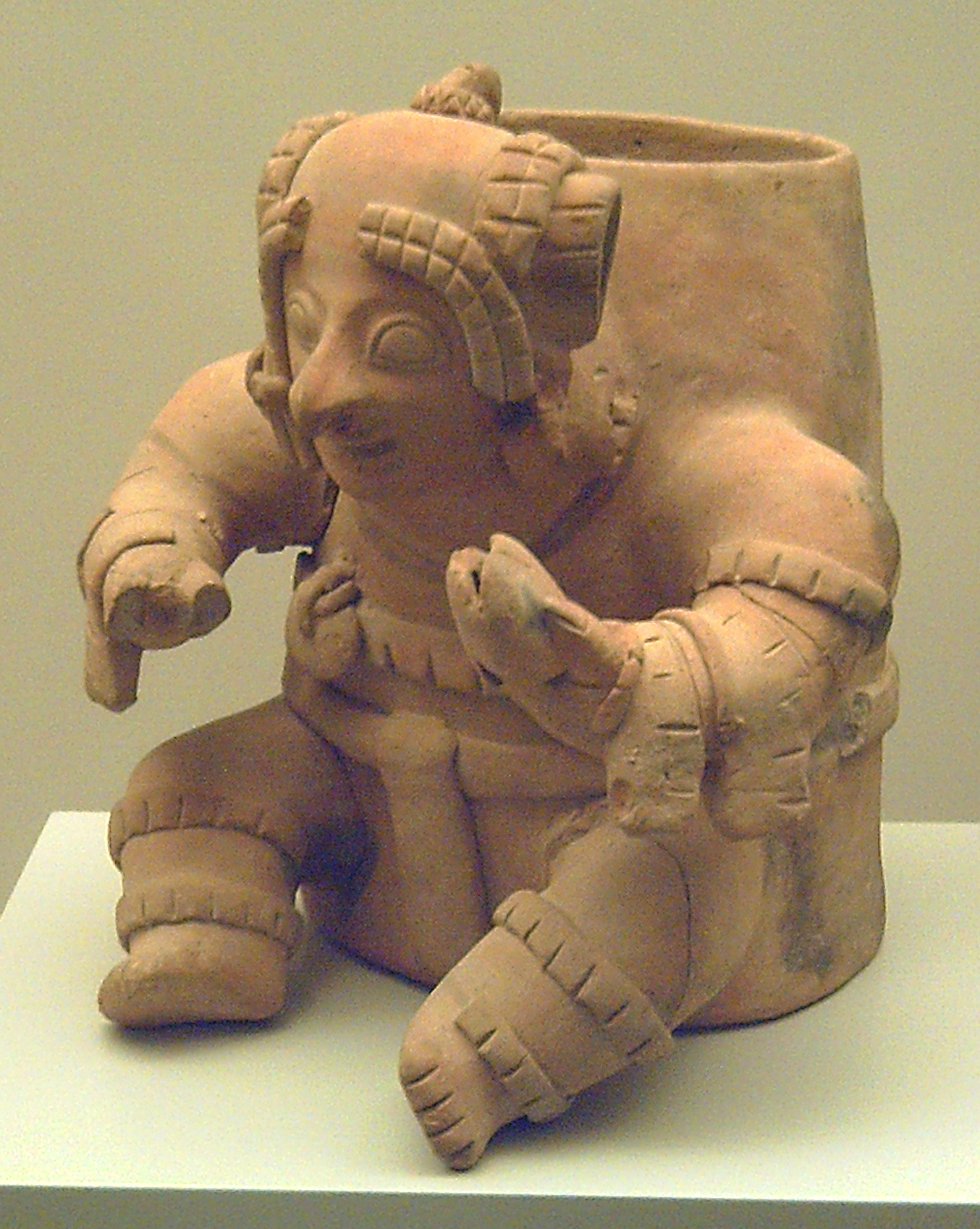
Ceramic vessel with a sitting human figure. Jama-Coaque Culture, of the Regional Development Period (500 BC–AD 500)

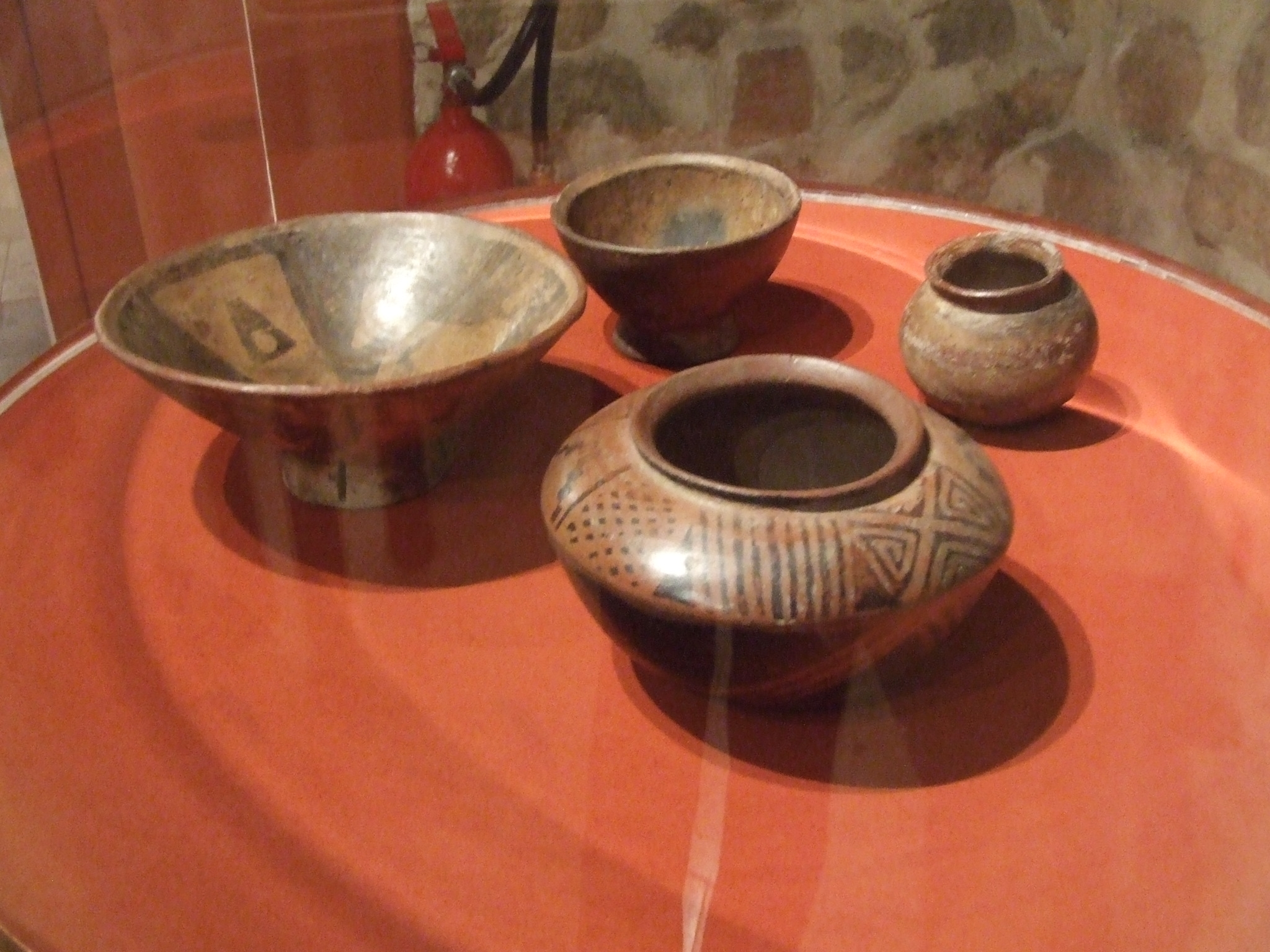
Ceramic bowls of Carchi culture (800-1500)

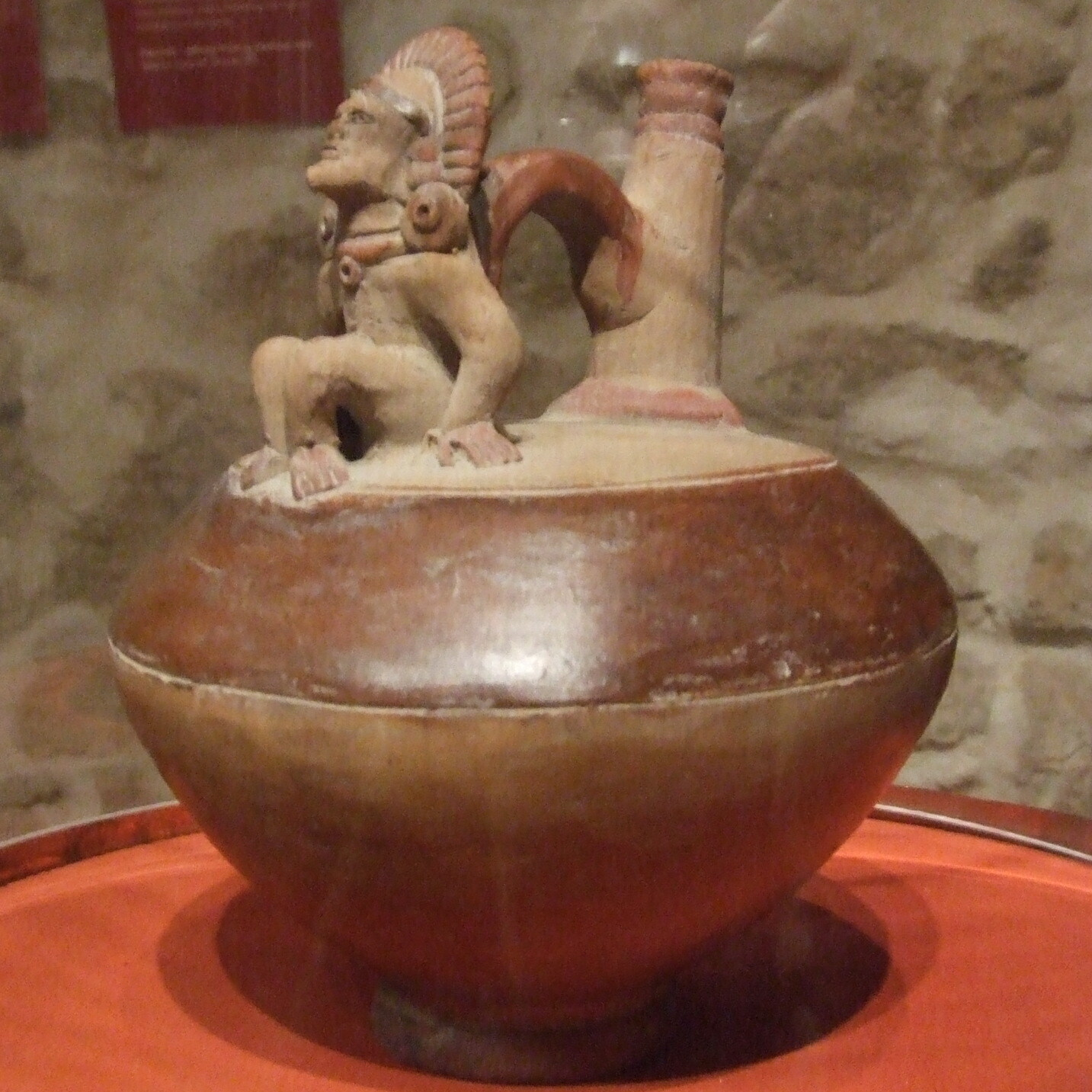
Utensil with a figure from Chorrera culture (900–300 BC)

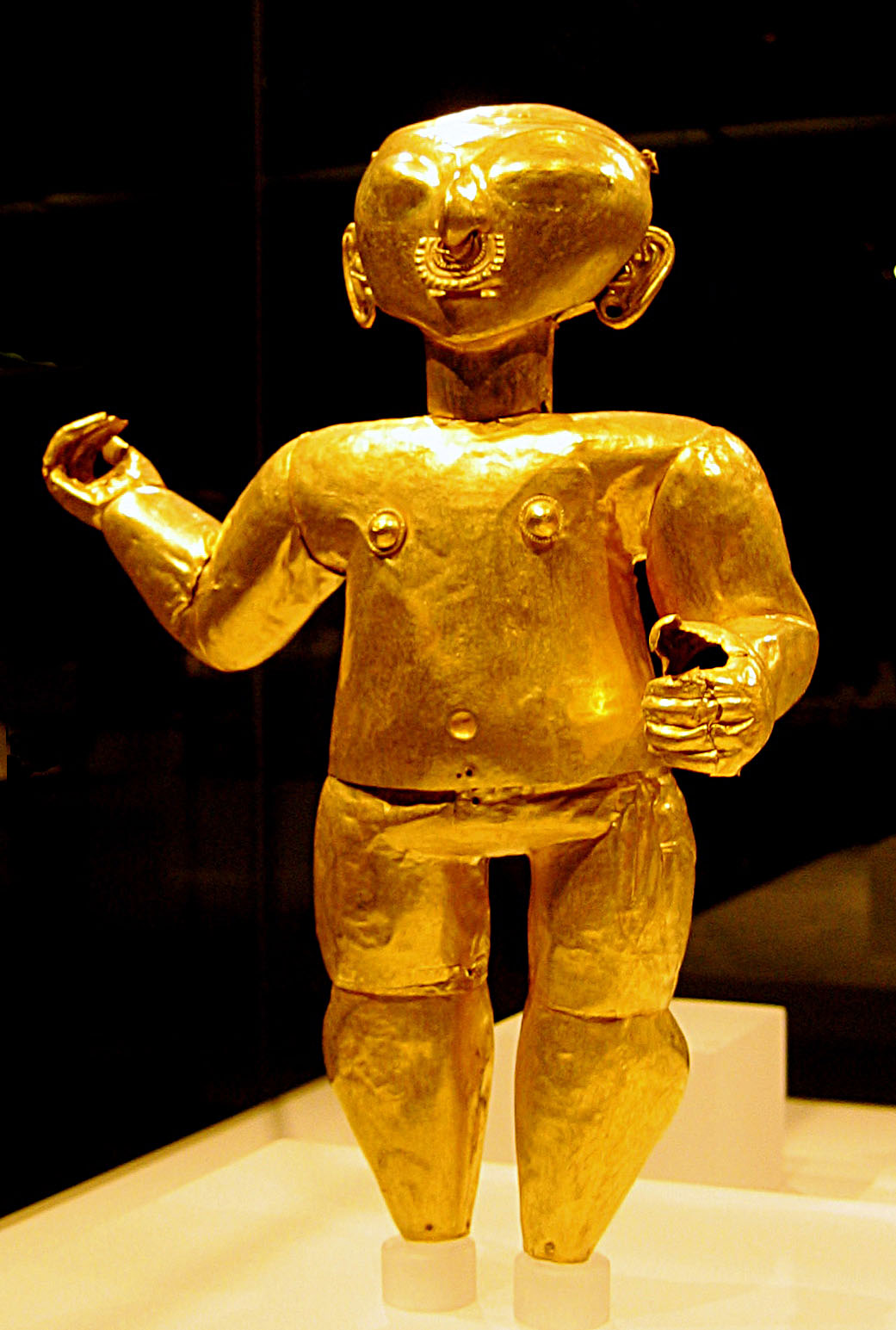
Standing Figure, La Tolita/Tumaco (1st century BC — 1st century AD)

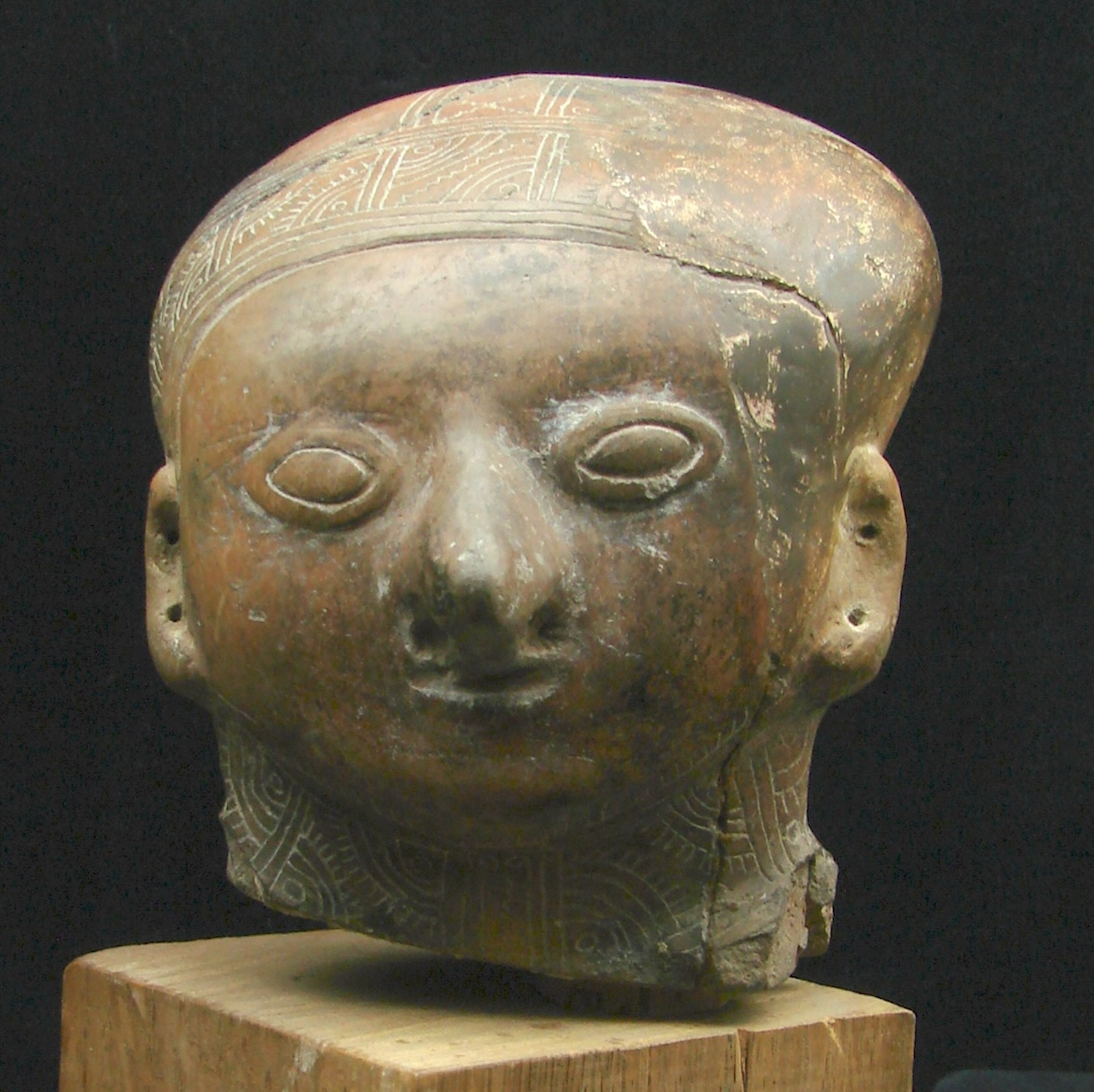
Statue from Chorrera Culture (1800—300 BC)

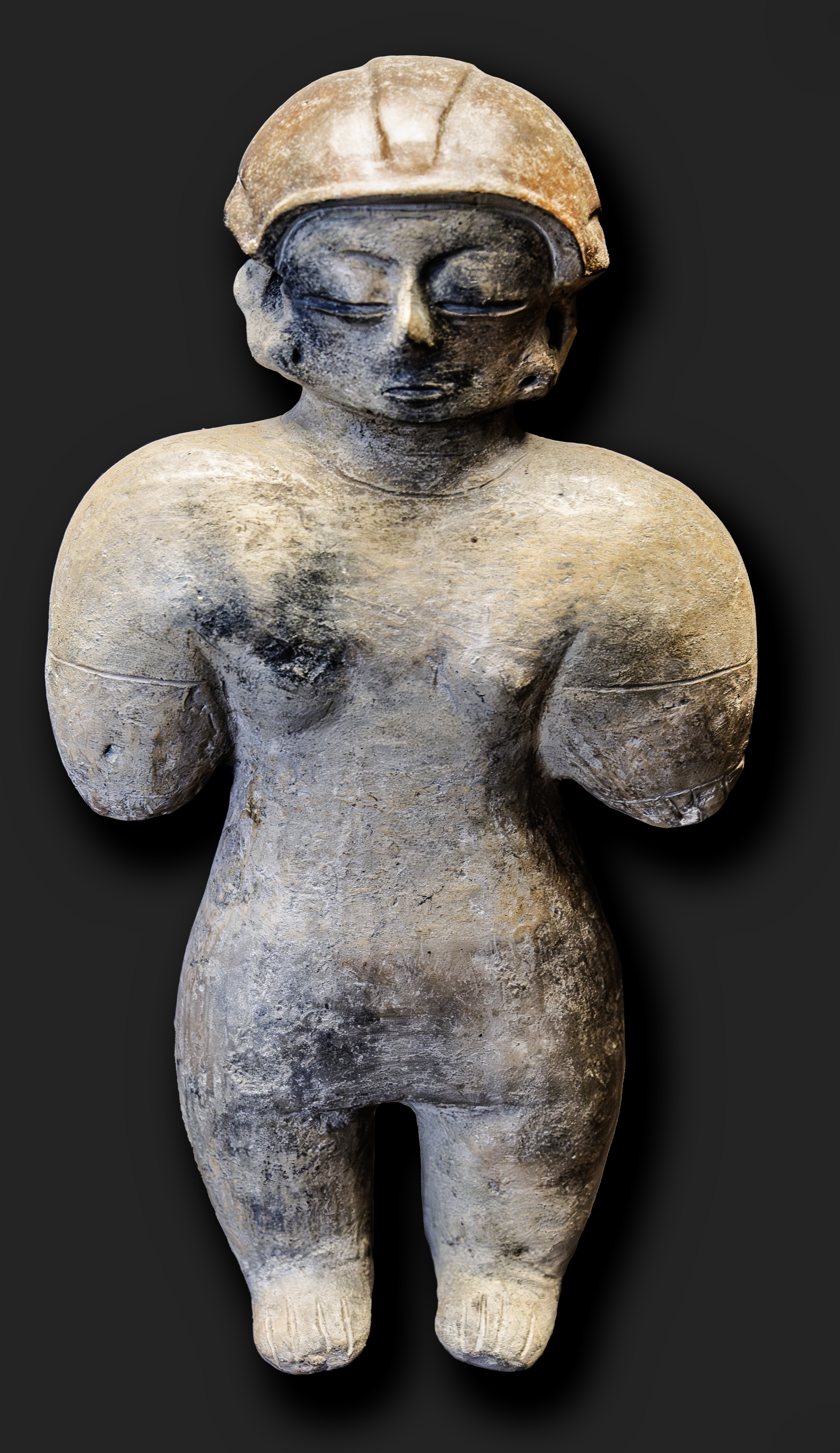
Statue from Chorrera Culture (1800—300 BC)

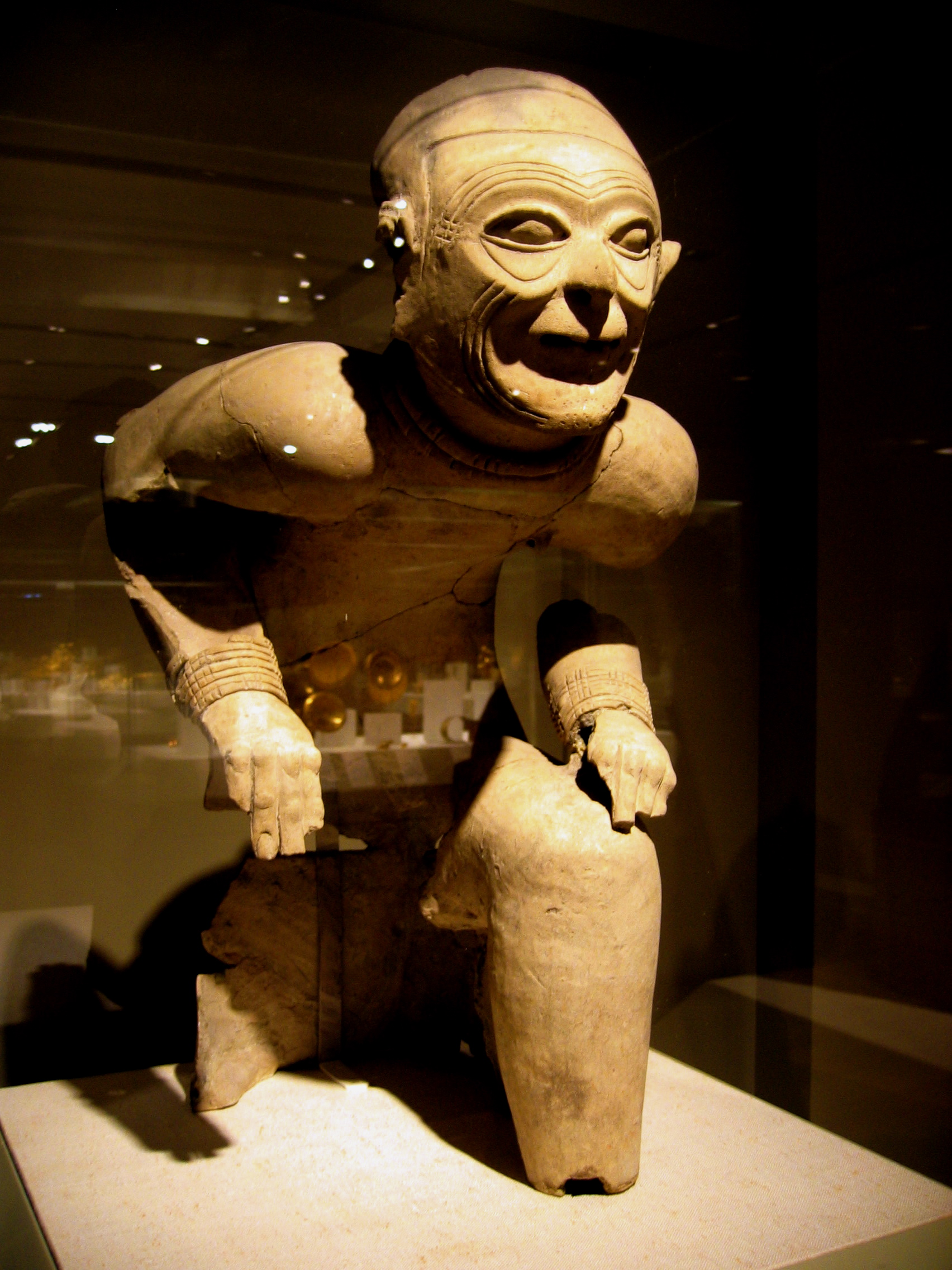
Statue from La Tolita/Tumaco
(c. 1 BC)

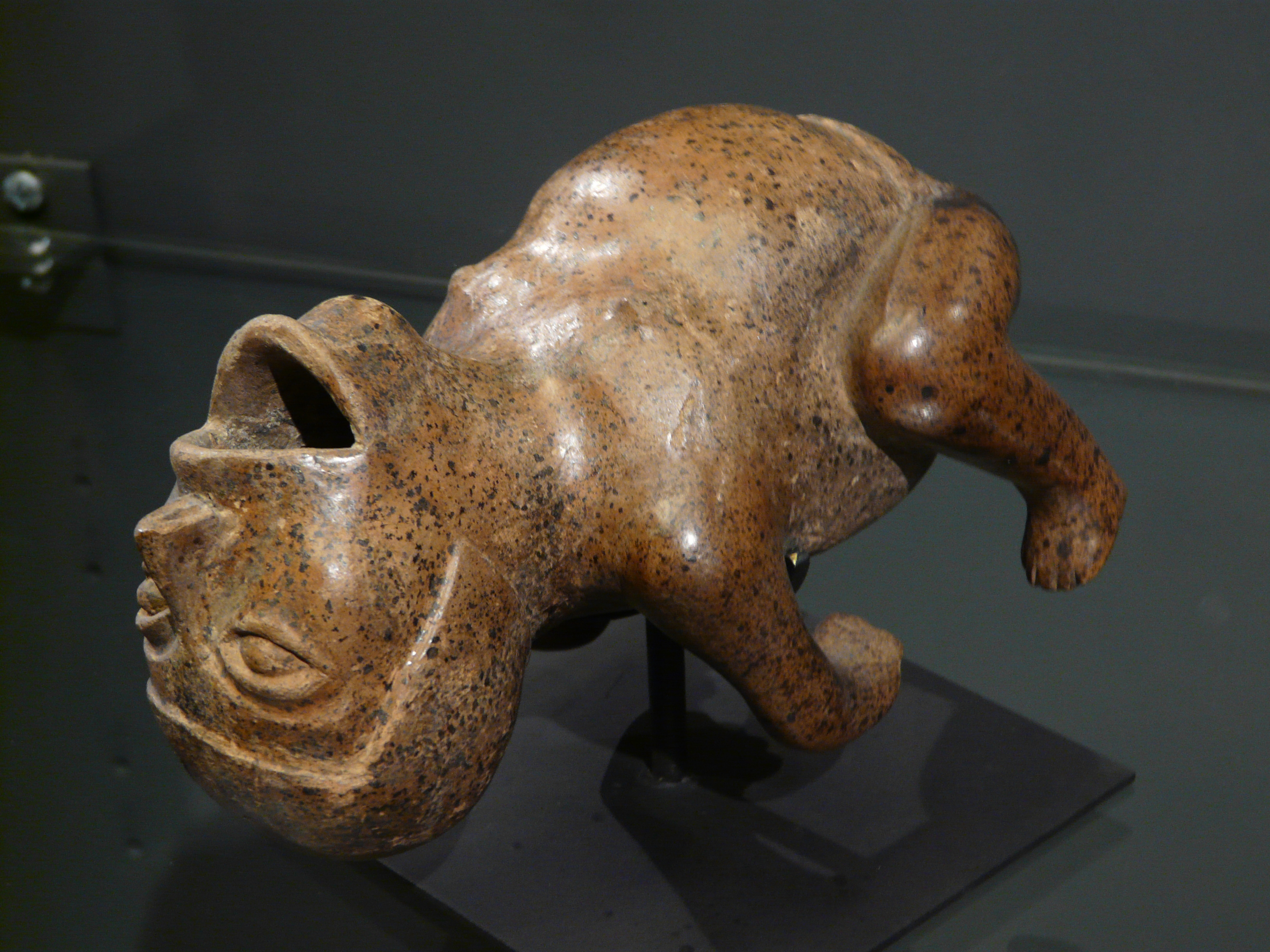
Capulí ceramic sculpture of a contortionist (800—1500)

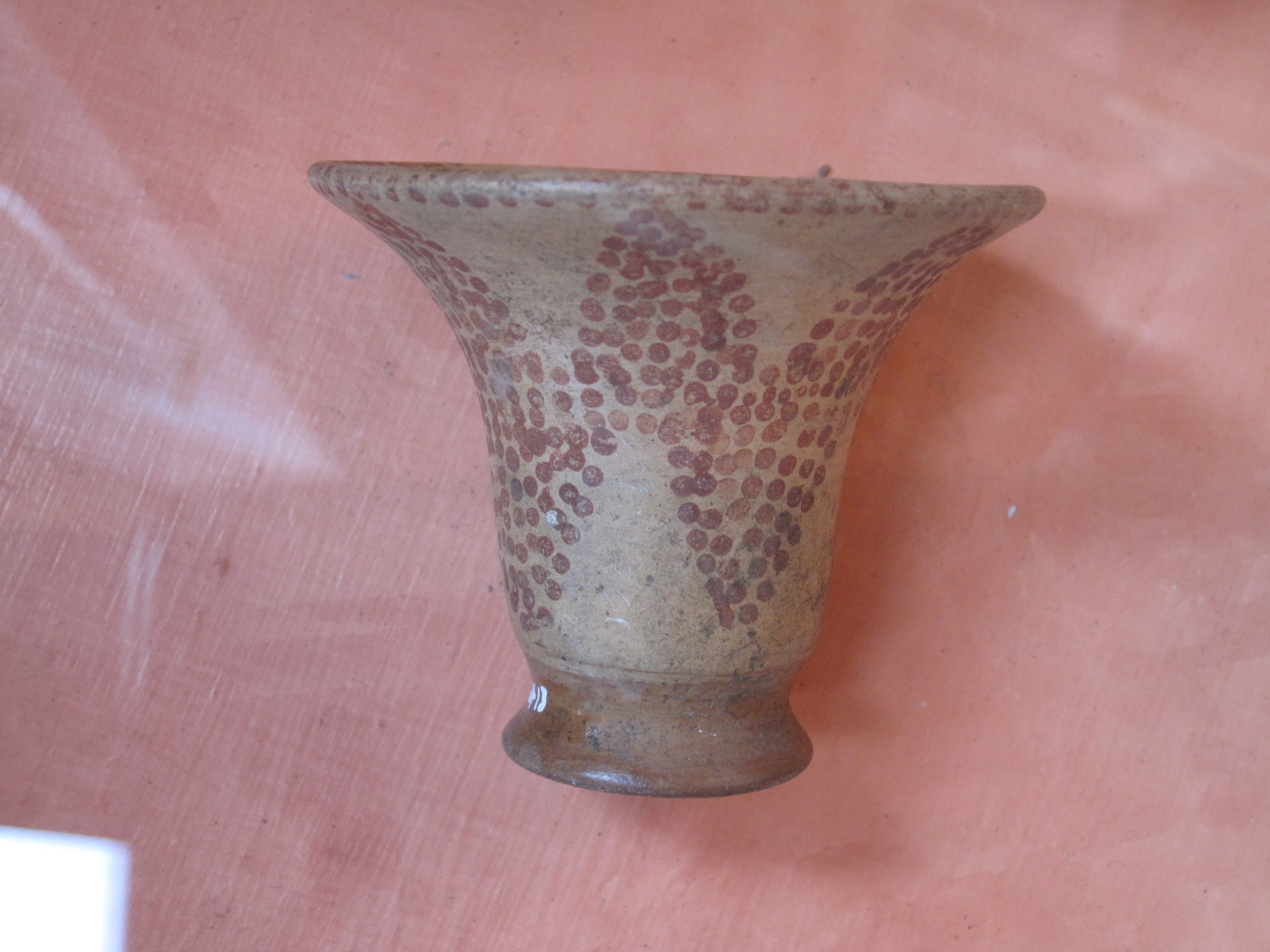
Cashaloma cup with dripped ("goteado") painting, Museo de las Culturas Aborigenes, Cuenca, Ecuador

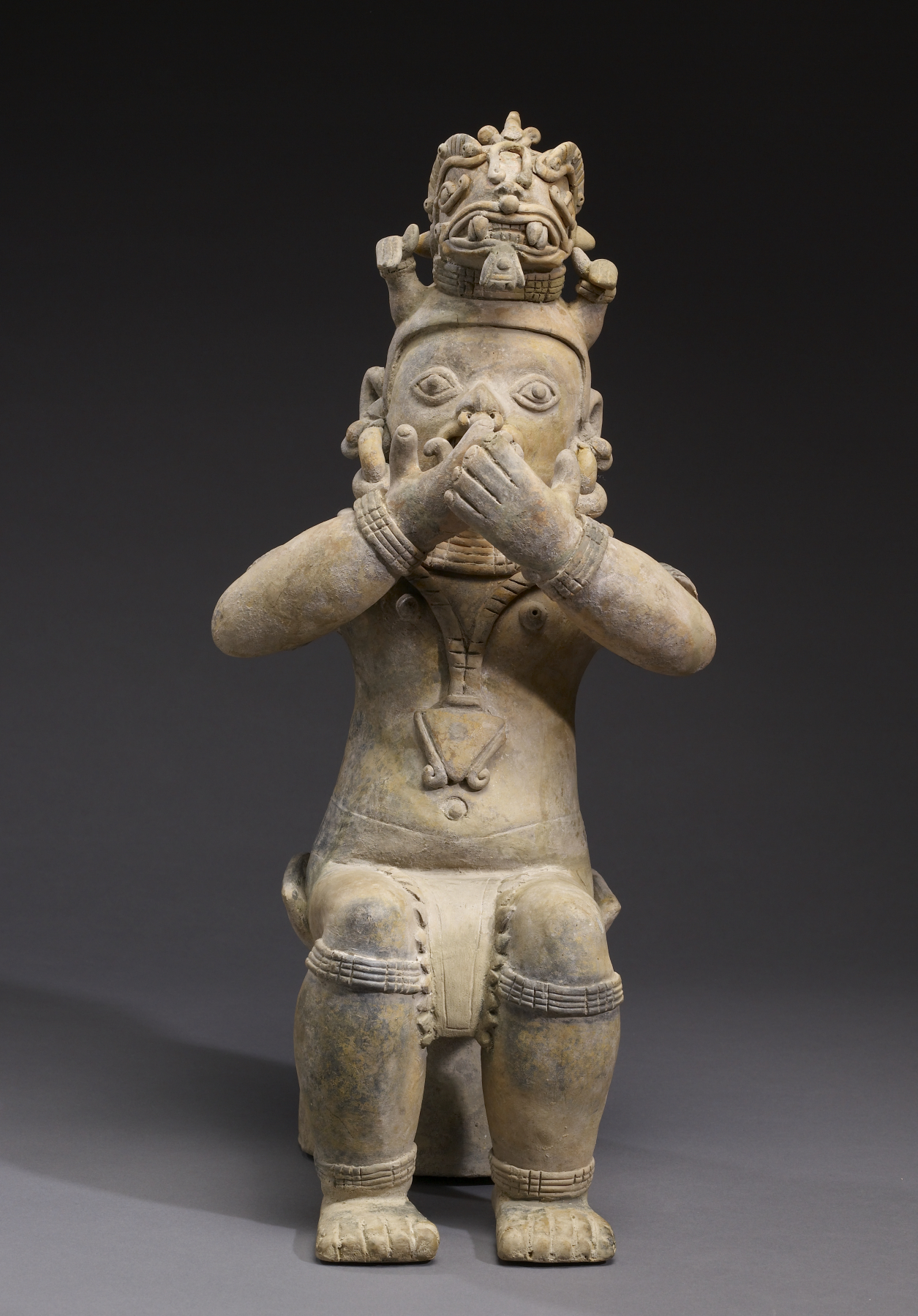
Jama-Coaque figurine, 300 BC-AD 800

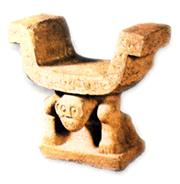
Manta culture chair

== See also ==
- Museo Antropologico y de Arte Contemporaneo, Guayaquil
- Museo Chileno de Arte Precolombino
- History of Ecuador
