= Chorrera culture =

Late Formative indigenous culture in Ecuador

Chorrera
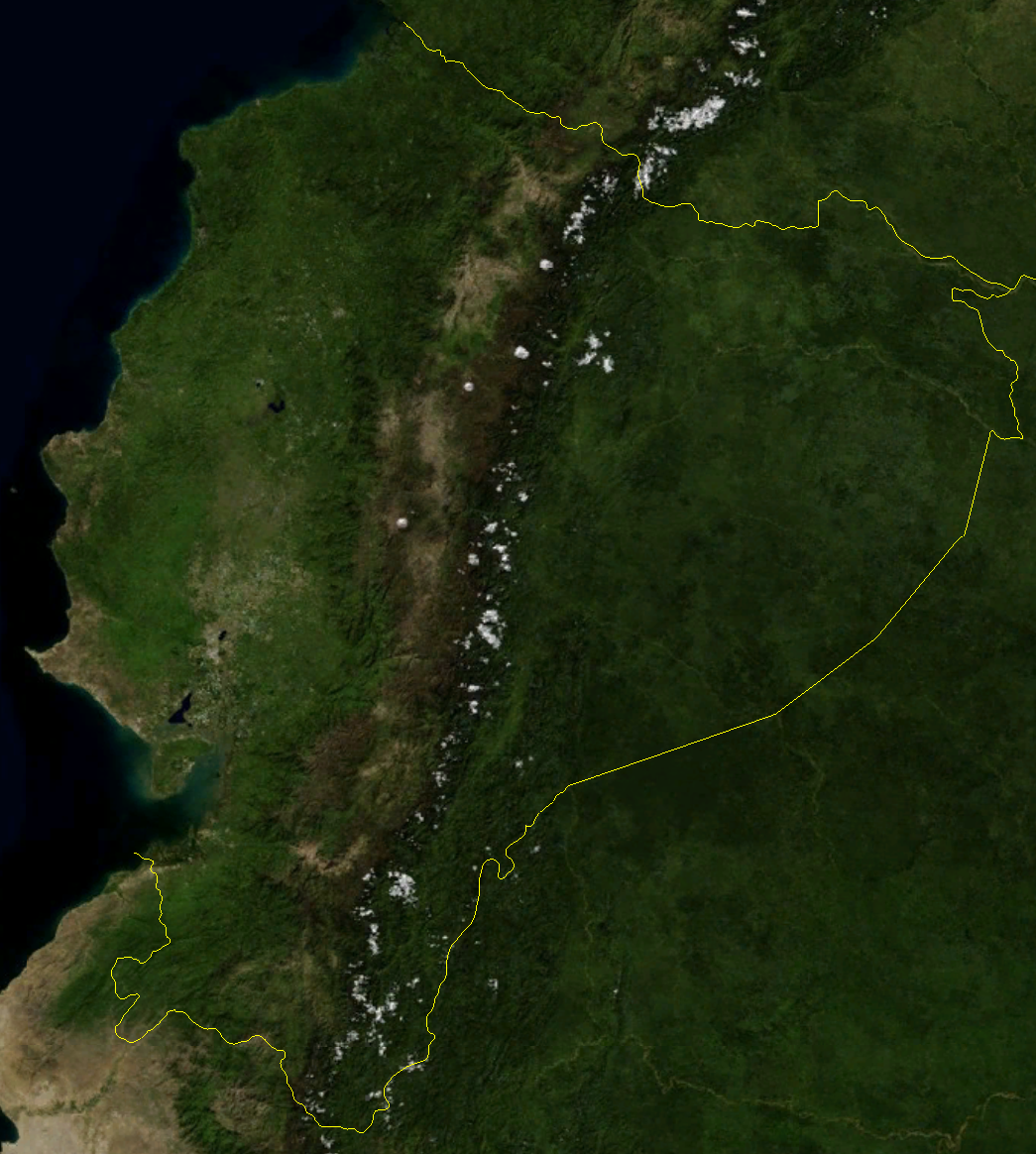
- Location of the Chorrera culture
- Geographical range: Ecuador
- Period: Formative
- Dates: c. 1300 - 300 BCE
- Preceded by: Machalilla
- Followed by: Bahía, Tuncahuán

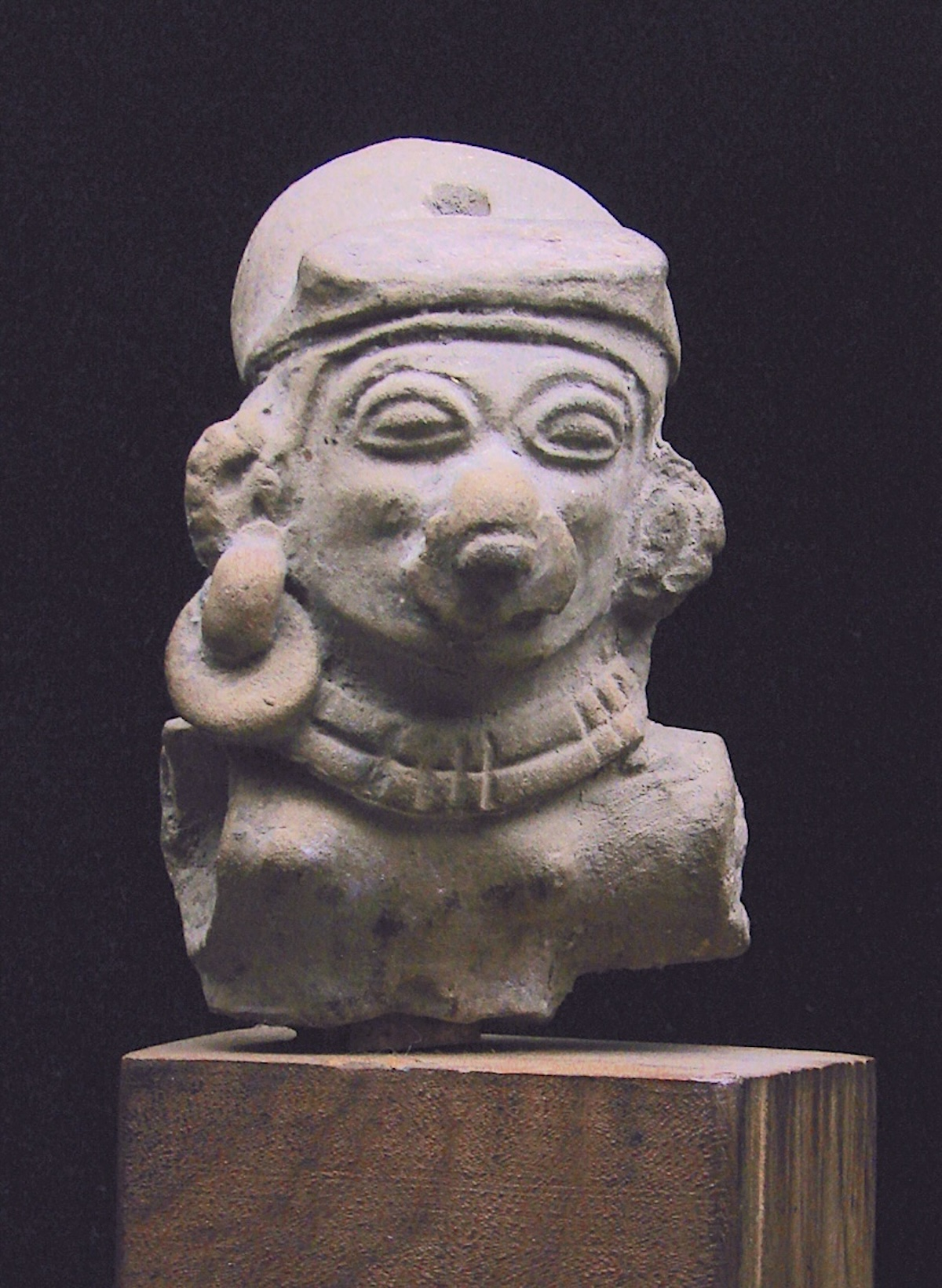
Chorrera human effigy fragment, Musée d'Aucha

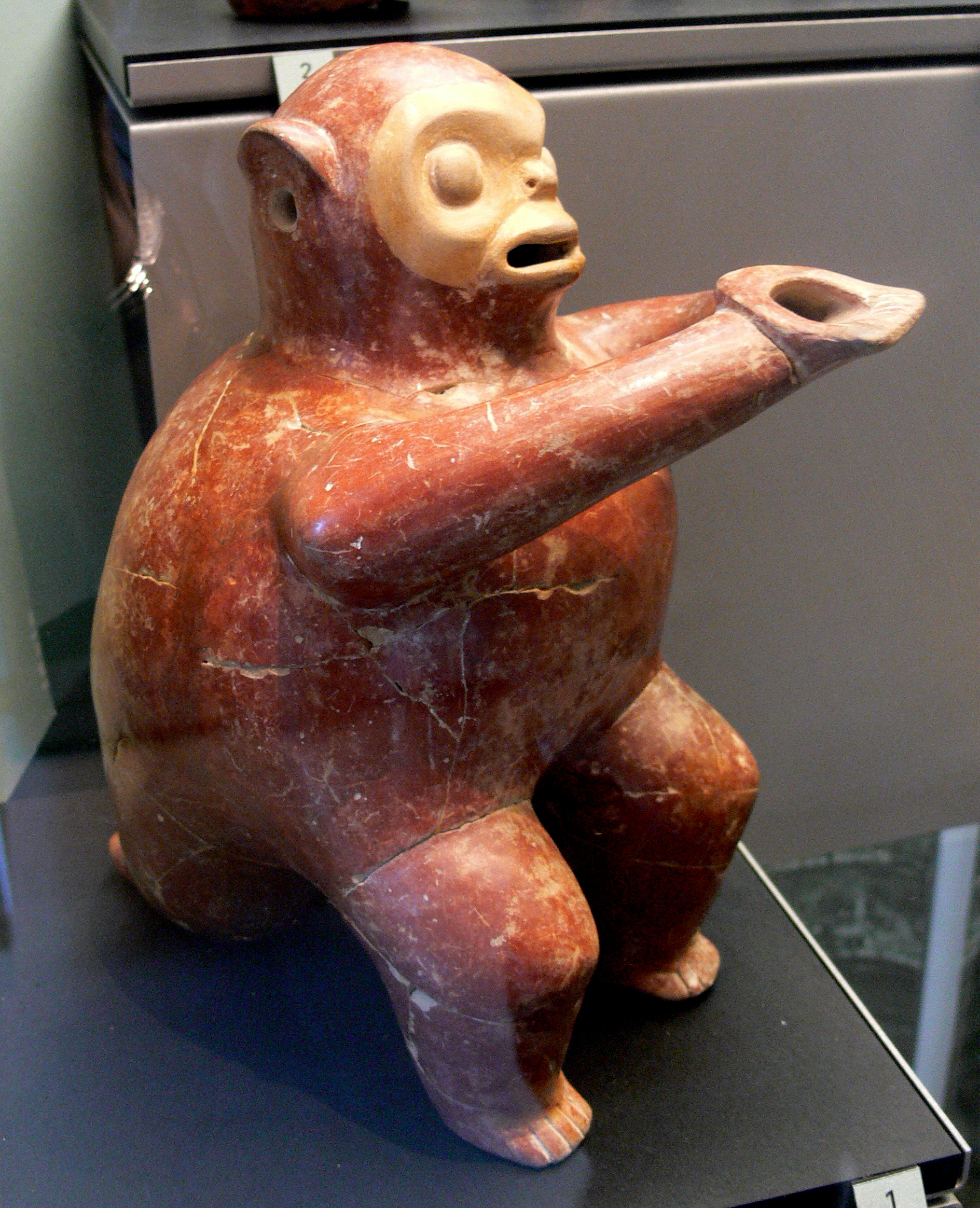
Chorerra zoomorphic whistling spout effigy bottle, 23 cm high, Museum zu Allerheiligen

The Chorrera culture or Chorrera tradition is a Late Formative indigenous culture that flourished between 1300 BCE and 300 BCE in Ecuador. Chorrera culture was one of the most widespread cultures in pre-Columbian Ecuador, spanning the Pacific lowlands to the Andean highlands, and even into southern Colombia.

== Regional divisions ==
Due to variations in ceramics and other material culture, Chorrera culture is divided into regional variants. These include:

- Mafa Phase, northern Esmeraldas Province
- Tachina Phase, southern Esmeraldas Province
- Tabuchula Phase, northern Manabí Province
- Engoroy Phase, Santa Elena Peninsula and Guayas coastal region
- Chorrera proper, Guayas River Basin
- Early Jubones Phase, southeastern Guaya and western Azuay Province
- Arenillas Phase, El Oro Province.

Other regions exhibit a strong Chorrera influence.

== Ceramics ==
The hallmark of Chorrera culture is its ceramic traditions, which features whistling animal and plant effigy Stirrup spout vessels and human figurines made from molds. Everyday utilitarian pottery was still very fine with thin decorated walls and red or black slips polished to a high sheen. Surfaces of bowls, bottles, ollas, and other ceramic pieces were incised, painted, pattern burnished, or decorated with rocker stamps. Ceramics were used in personal adornments as well, examples being ceramic ear spools and rocker stamps used for body painting.

Unusual decorative features of Chorrera ceramics include resist-painting and iridescent slips.

== Use of metals ==
Chorrera craftsmen produced some of the earliest metal objects in Ecuador. Numerous metal objects and fragments were excavated at the coastal site of Salango. Objects from copper, silver and gold were made, mostly elite goods like jewelry.

== Diet ==
Crops cultivated by Chorrera people include achira (Canna indica), arrowroot (Maranta arundinacea), corn (Zea mays), common beans (Phaseolus vulgaris), as well as gourds and squash (Cucurbitaceae). They also gathered wild tree fruits, sedge (Cyperaceae), and palm (Palmae).

Chorrera people fished and hunted as well, catching game such as armadillo, deer (including white-tailed and brocket deer) duck, frogs, lizards, peccary, and various rodents.

== Trade ==
This culture continued the brisk trade network established by Valdivia and Machalilla cultures. Chorrera fisherman traded spiny oyster shells (Spondylus) and other marine shells with people from the Quito basin for obsidian. Gold is traded in the latter centuries BCE.

== Decline ==
In 467 BCE, the Pululahua Volcano north of Quito erupted, sending volcanic ash over much of the western Ecuadorian lowland regions, which greatly reduced the expressions of Chorrera culture; however, some Chorrera settlements in the far north and south continued for several centuries. These evolved into more complex cultures of the Regional Developmental Period of 200 and 300 BCE.

== Bibliography ==
- Zeidler, J. A. "The Ecuadorian Formative." Helaine Silverman and William H. Isbell, eds. Handbook of South American Archaeology. New York: Springer, 2008. ISBN 978-0-387-75228-0.
