= Tuncahuán =

Archaeological culture found in Ecuador

- Period: Regional Development
- Dates: 500 BCE - 500 CE
- Preceded by: Chorrera culture
- Followed by: Cañari

The Tuncahuán is a phase of pre-Columbian Andean civilisations. It flourished in the central highlands of Ecuador and is believed to be traced back to 500 BCE to 500 CE.

There has been very little archaeological research in this region of Ecuador. Ecuadorian archaeologist Jacinto Caamano Jijón was the first to describe Tuncahuán phase in early twentieth century, based on his excavation of five graves in a cemetery.

== Archaeological findings ==
All the tombs bar one were for adults, and funerary items contained ceramic and copper.

The pottery of this phase is usually decorated with white paint, red slip and negative painting in several different combinations.

A Tuncahuán container collection at Simon Fraser University includes a fountain with pedestal, or compote, with a high base ring which supports a single source without restriction. The high base has been decorated with cuts, incisions and cream slip. The source thereof is engobada cream inside and red at the edge extending downward literally at the outer edge. There is a handprint inside the source could have been made by the potter when collected and his hand was wet with white slip.
