= Bahía culture =

Archaeological culture in Ecuador

Bahía
- Location of the Bahía culture
- Geographical range: Manabí
- Period: Regional Development
- Dates: 500 BCE – 500 CE
- Preceded by: Chorrera culture
- Followed by: Manteño civilization

The Bahía culture (500 BCE–500 CE) was a pre-Columbian culture in Ecuador.

Bahía culture originated in what is now the Manabí Province on the Pacific Coast, and spread to Bahía de Caráquez and to the Andean foothills. Their ceramic tradition is one of the first found north of the Andes.

Chirije, a seaport, was a major Bahía archaeological site discovered by Emilio Estrada in the 1950s. Merchants traded finished goods and Spondylus princeps or red spiny oyster shells south to Chile and north as far as Mexico in exchange for precious materials such as copper and gold.

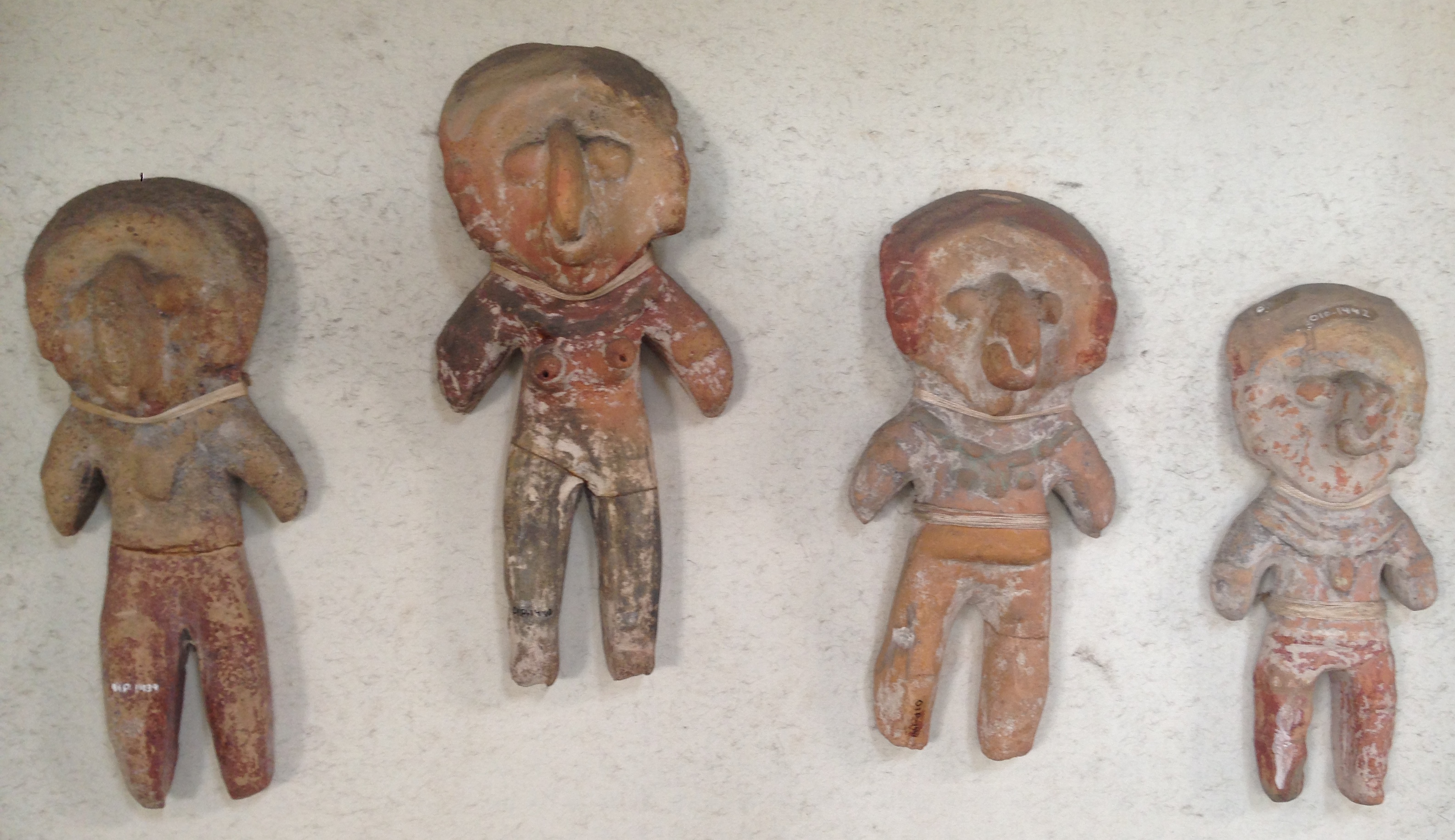
Big-nose figurines

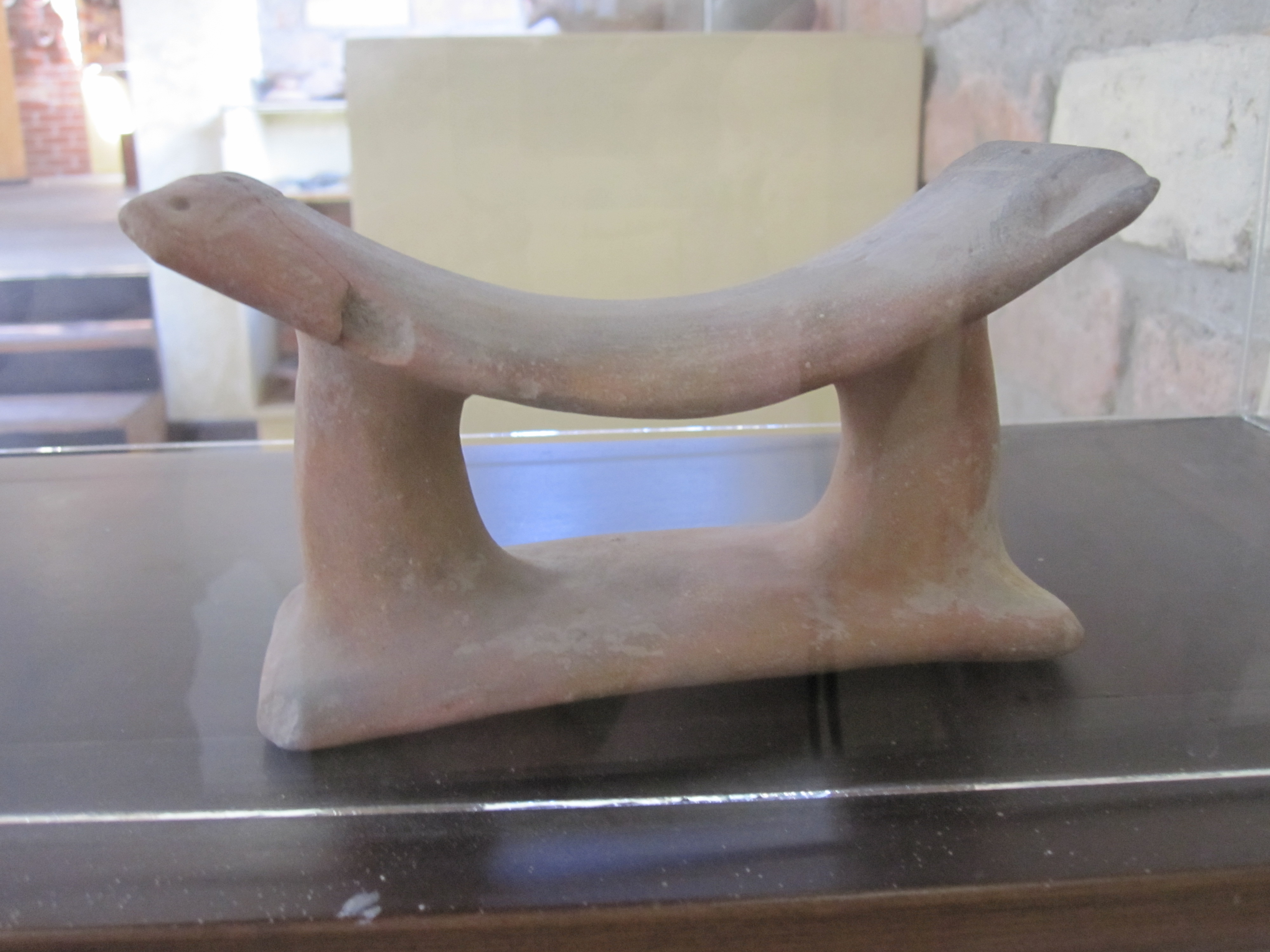
Neck rest

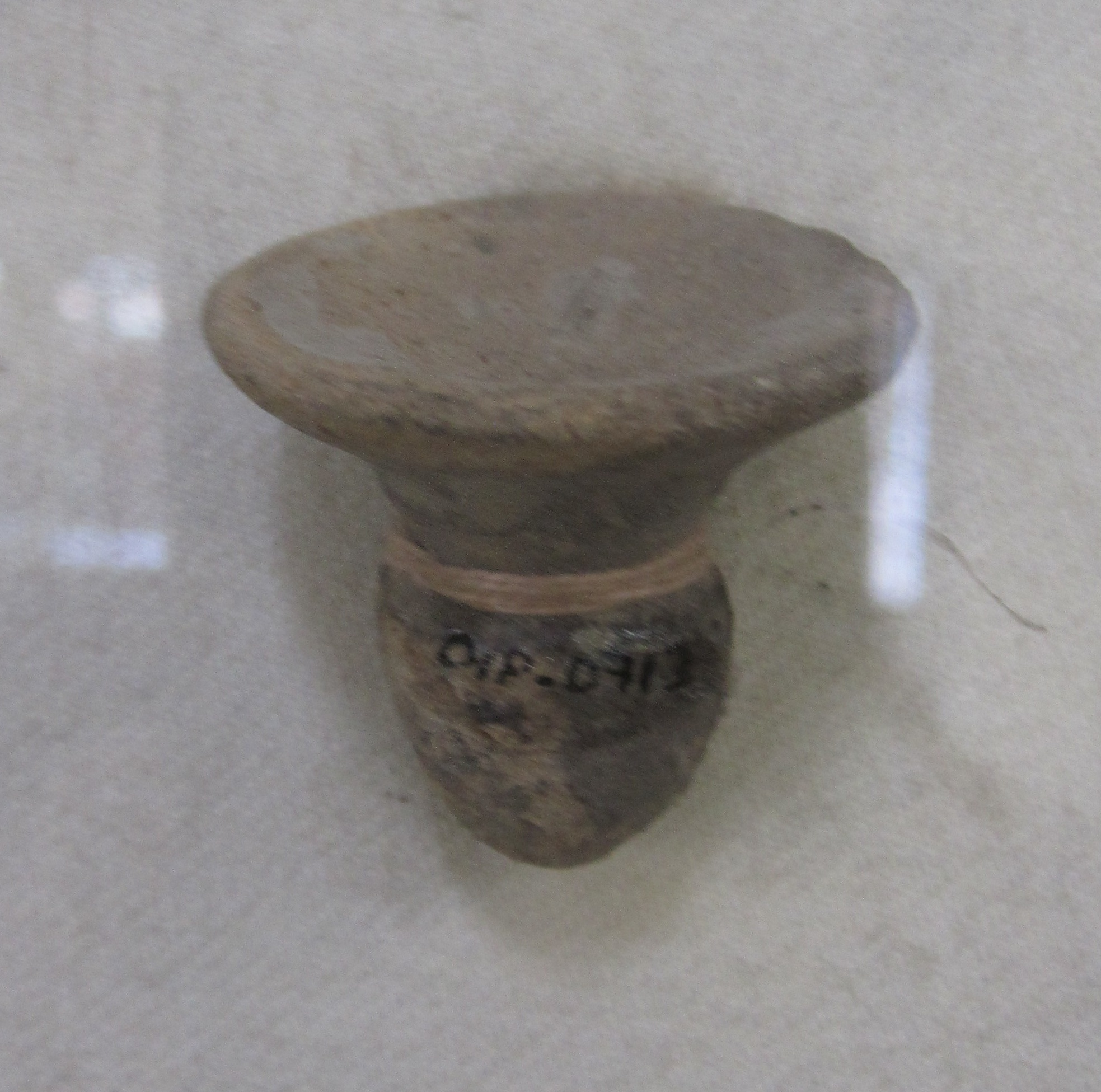
Ear plug

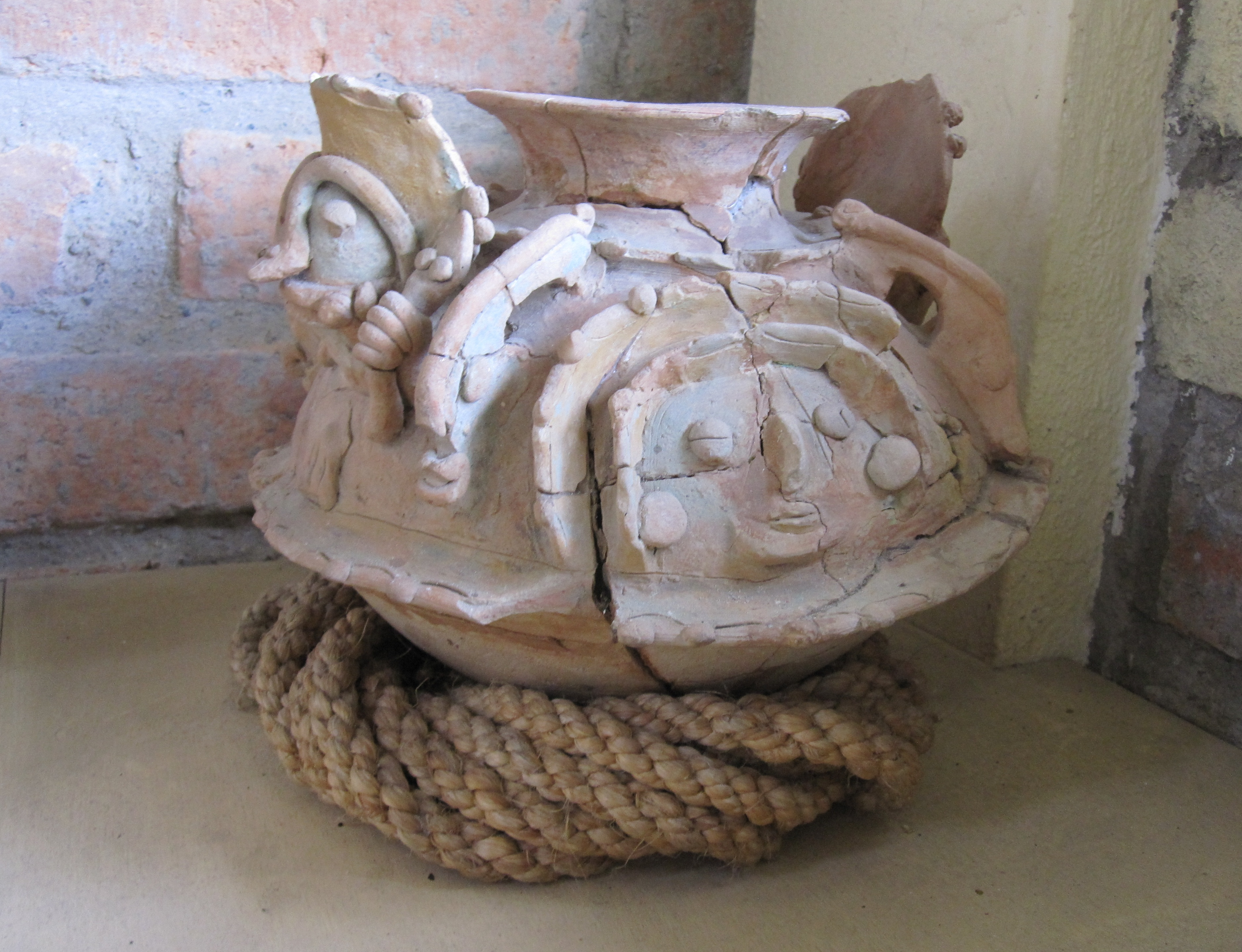
Sorcerer's cauldron

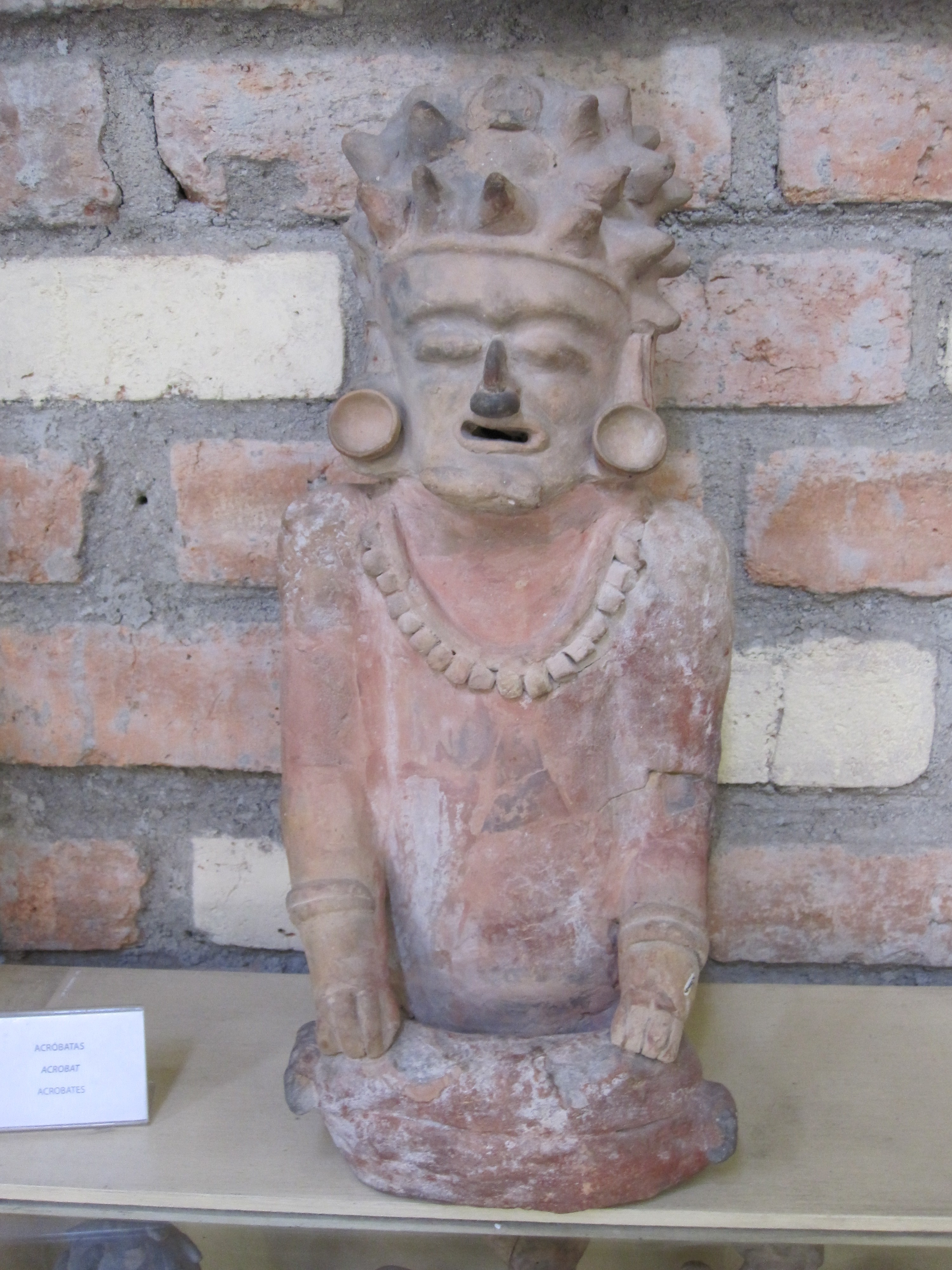
Witch or shaman sculpture

== See also ==
- Pre-Columbian Ecuador
