= Manteño-Huancavilca culture =

Archaeological culture

Manteño
- c. 600–1530
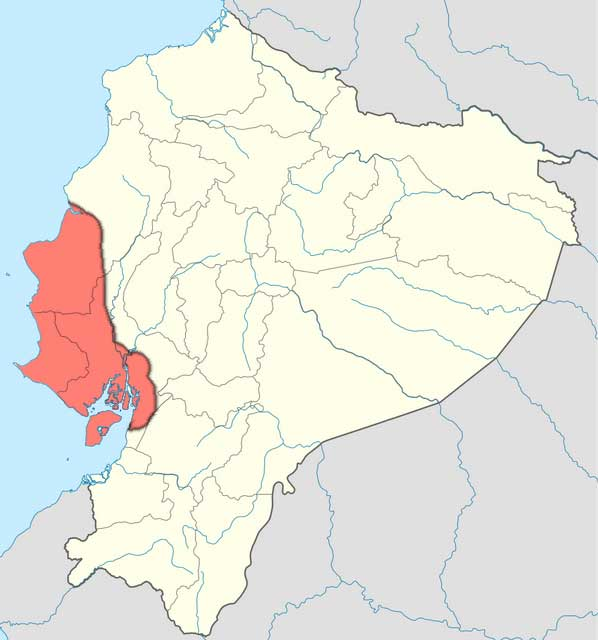
- A map of the Manteno culture (red) within Ecuador (yellow). The eastern boundary was complex (not shown)
- Capital: Manta
- Historical era: Integration
  - Established: c. 600
  - Disestablished: 1530
Preceded by	Succeeded by
Bahía culture	Inca Empire

The Manteño-Huancavilca culture (Spanish: Los Manteños) were one of the last pre-Columbian cultures in modern-day Ecuador, active from 850 to 1600 CE (1150–400 BP). It encompasses the area of the earlier Valdivia culture.

== Scope ==
The term was coined in the mid-20th century by Ecuadorian archeologist Jacinto Jijón y Caamaño, to describe pre-Hispanic settlement near the town of Manta on the Pacific coast. Their historic area has been engulfed in part by more recent settlement.

Soon after Jijón y Caamaño published his findings, the term Manteño began to be applied to several distinct sub-groups: northern Manteño (Manteño del Norte, Sillas, or Manabita), southern Manteño (Huancavilca) and Punáe. Some archaeologists and historians reject this split, however, applying the term Huancavilca to all three groups; this term is of Incan origin, from the time of the first colonisation.

Little work has distinguished such groupings. Historian Cieza de León, however, says that residents in coastal towns north of Salango used a type of facial tattoo distinguishable from those to their south. Other proposed divisions have included coastal and inland areas, based on types of burial and subsistence.

The Manteño chiefdoms – under the broad definition – extended over coastal parts of the present-day provinces of Manabí, Santa Elena and Guayas, including La Plata Island. The Bahía de Caráquez and Chone River mark the northern boundary of this territory, and the Guayas basin its southern boundary. The Huancavilca people are traditionally associated with the legend of Guayas and Quil, the legendary chief and his wife, which is a popular explanation for the naming of the city of Guayaquil.

According to early colonial sources, the town of Picoazá was the site of a Manteño chiefdom. In addition, major sites have been found at the Cerro de Hojas and Cerro Jaboncillo, the Cerro de Paco, Cerro las Negras, Cerro los Santo, Bellavista, Agua Blanca, Loma de los Cangrejitos, López Viejo, Los Frailes, Montecristi, Olón, Salango and La Libertad.

== Organisation ==
Many (if not all) were split into four major settlements, with the chief of the principal settlement overlord. Caamaño believed that the Manteños operated like a trading ring rather than a kingdom or empire, and drew parallels to the Hanseatic League. Manteño settlements typically contain large quantities of characteristic pottery and large stone foundations.

== Lifestyle ==
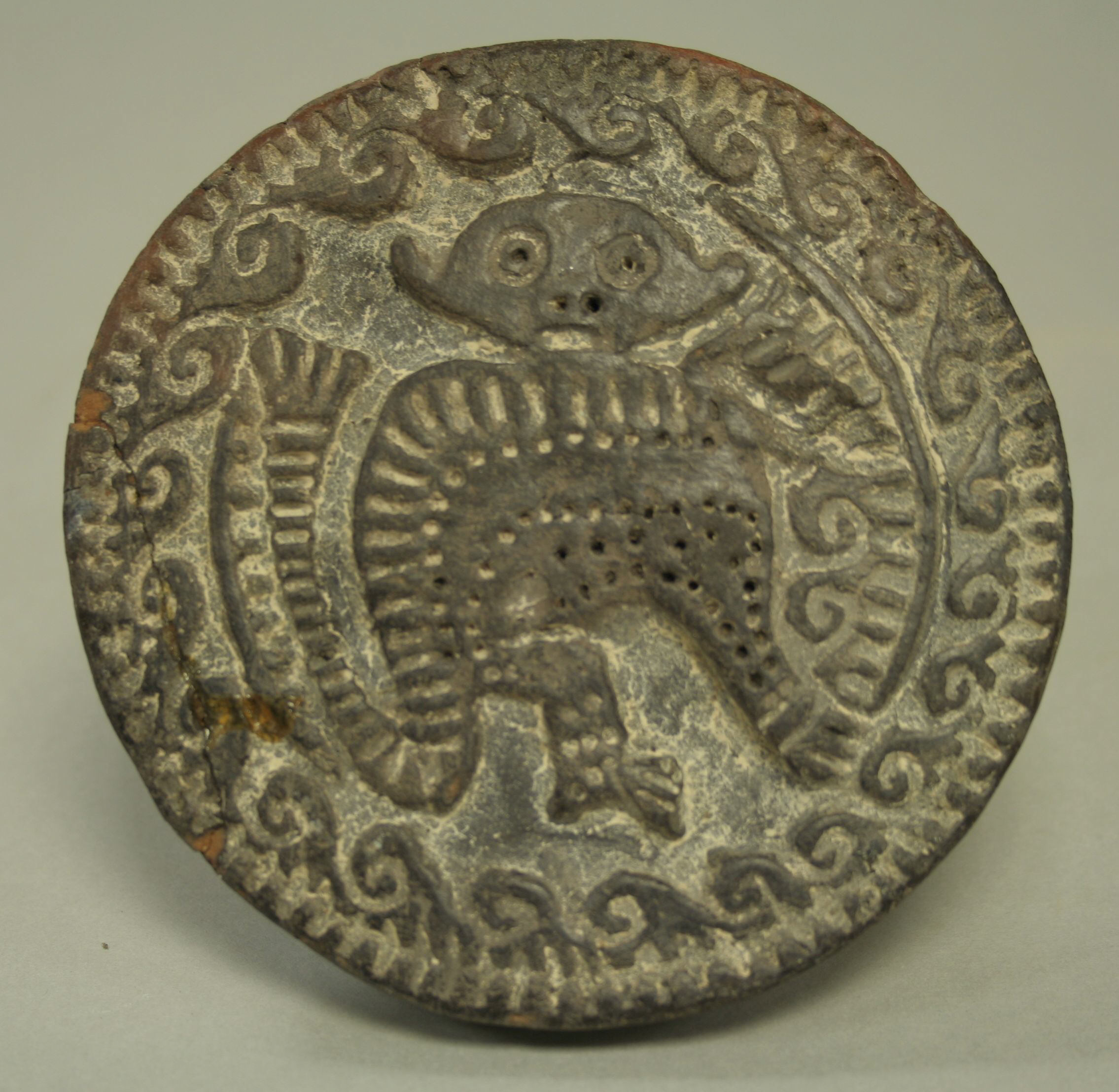
Ceramic staff with profile figure, the Metropolitan Museum of Art

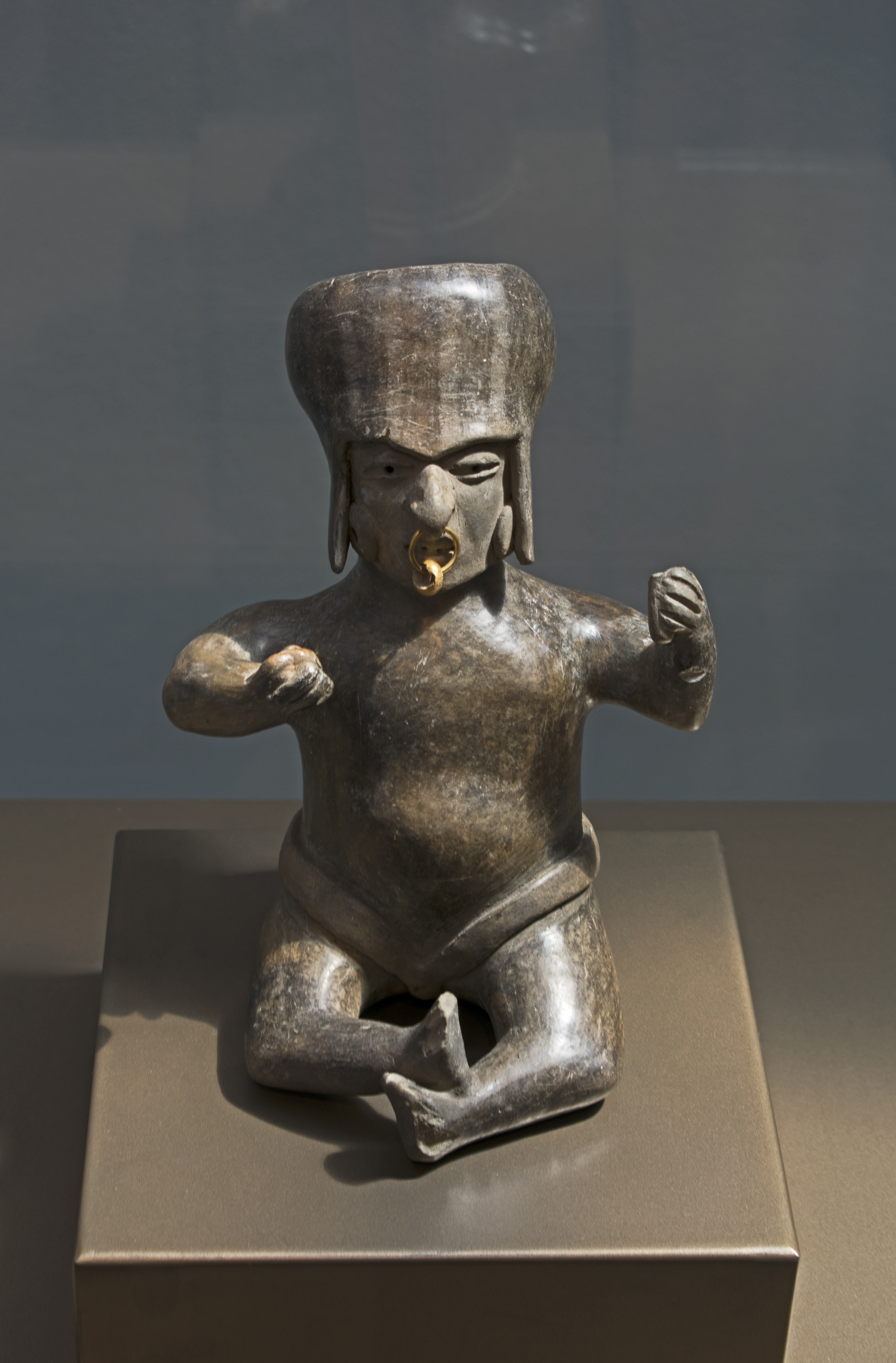
Statue, Casa del Alabado Museum of Pre-Columbian Art, Quito, Ecuador

The culture primarily grew fruits and vegetables, such as maize, peanuts, tomatoes, and squash. The civilizations built their houses out of straw or palm leaves, and also used houses made of a type of bamboo native to the region, using river rocks as a foundation. The culture was also specialized in diving for Spondylus, a food that was said to be of the gods. They also used its purple and orange shell as a type of currency; this shell was traded throughout the region as far north as Mexico. The Spondylus is unique to the warm waters of coastal Ecuador. The Manteños were such a unique culture that the Inca never conquered them and let the Manteños buy their way with the food and shell of the gods that they only knew how to find due to this specialization of diving.

== See also ==
- List of pre-Columbian cultures
- Sexual diversity in the Huancavilca culture
