= Sexual diversity in the Huancavilca culture =

Pre-Columbian acceptance of same-sex relationships among the Huancavilca people

According to information collected by Spanish chroniclers during the 16th century, sexual diversity in the Huancavilca culture was practiced much more openly than among other indigenous peoples inhabiting the territories that currently comprise Ecuador. These chronicles highlight the role of groups of men who formed kinds of homosexual harems that participated in religious ceremonies and had sexual relations with the caciques of their respective tribes.

Archaeological remains of the Huancavilca population depicting sexual relations between men have also been found, which could have a much earlier origin. In 1982, a pre-Columbian clay figurine showing two men having anal sex was recovered in the coastal town of Olón. Although its date of creation was not verified, archaeologist Erick López Reyes identified characteristics in the figurine from the transitional stage between the Guangala Culture and the Huancavilca culture, which would place it hundreds of years before the arrival of the Spanish in the Americas.

== Historical records ==
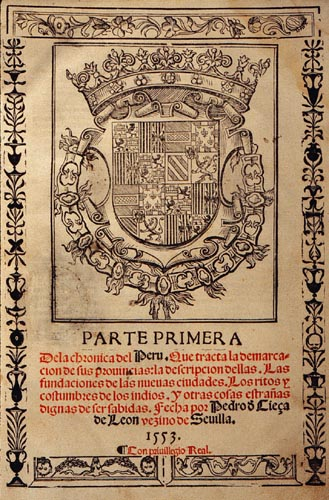
Pedro Cieza de León described the enchaquirados in his Crónica del Perú.

As a result of data compiled by anthropologist Hugo Benavides, it is known that homosexual practices in Huancavilca culture were recorded by chroniclers such as Pedro Cieza de León, Gonzalo Fernández de Oviedo, Inca Garcilaso de la Vega, Agustín de Zárate, Girolamo Benzoni, among others. Something common in these records is the contrast between the acceptance these relationships enjoyed among the indigenous population and the rejection expressed by the chroniclers in referring to them, describing them as "abominable" or "nefarious" acts. An example of this is found in the chronicles of Garcilaso de la Vega, who referred to the homosexual practices of the Huancavilcas as a "vice" and detailed that its members "practiced sodomy more openly" than other peoples in the area. Girolamo Benzoni, for his part, referred to the Huancavilcas as "filthy sodomites."

In one of his chronicles, Pedro Cieza de León provides a detailed description of the "enchaquirados" who receive this name in Benavides' research from the use of chaquiras, which were beads made from shiny red or white shells. Cieza de León describes the enchaquirados as men (one or more per temple) who fulfilled the role of priests or guardians of the various deities worshipped by the Huancavilcas and who had homosexual relations with the authorities of their tribes during their religious festivities. These men were chosen for this role from childhood and adopted feminine clothing and customs typical of Huancavilca women.

Another description of the enchaquirados is given by Fernández de Oviedo, who called the Huancavilcas "abominable sodomites" and spoke of the custom of having "boys well adorned with chaquiras and dressed with considerable gold jewelry." According to Benavides, the use of objects considered invaluable by the Huancavilcas, such as gold and shell spondylus chaquiras, indicates the elevated status this group had within the social hierarchy of the tribes. Benavides also notes the possibility that some enchaquirados were buried alive alongside their caciques at the time of their death, as the chronicles of Cieza de León and Agustín de Zárate seem to suggest when discussing Huancavilca mortuary rites in which the favorite wives of a cacique were buried with him, as well as "two or three young boys from his service."

According to Cieza de León, the Huancavilcas were harshly punished by captains Francisco Pacheco and Juan de Olmos for practicing homosexuality.

== Legacy ==
Following the publication of Benavides' work on the enchaquirados in 2006, the LGBT community of the rural coastal town of Engabao reappropriated the term and adopted it, emphasizing their lineage as direct descendants of the Huancavilca people and their desire to rescue their historical legacy. In 2011 they founded the association Los Enchaquirados de Engabao, which at the time of its creation brought together 45 people, including gay men and transgender women, many of them engaged in fishing.

In recent years, this expression of sexual diversity has attracted the attention of artists, such as Francisco Vera, a painter who in 2018 held an art exhibition entitled Chaquiras para un duelo (Chaquiras for a Duel), in which he vindicated the role of the enchaquirados in the history of sexual diversity in Guayaquil; or Dave Aidan, a theater actor who in June 2022 premiered the theatrical piece "Enchaquirado" in Madrid. In November 2021, Ecuadorian director Iván Mora Manzano premiered at the International Documentary Film Festival Amsterdam the documentary La playa de los enchaquirados (The Beach of the Enchaquirados), in which he explores the life of Vicky, a transgender woman through whom the life of the enchaquirado community inhabiting Engabao is presented. During the 2022 edition of the Guadalajara International Film Festival, the film won an honorable mention in the best documentary category.

== See also ==
- LGBTQ history in Ecuador
- LGBT pride in Ecuador
