= Machalilla culture =

Prehistoric culture of Ecuador

Machalilla
- Location of the Machalilla culture
- Geographical range: Manabí
- Period: Archaic
- Dates: c. 1500 - 1100 BCE
- Preceded by: Valdivia culture
- Followed by: Chorrera culture

The Machalilla were a prehistoric people in Ecuador, in southern Manabí and the Santa Elena Peninsula. The dates when the culture thrived are uncertain, but are generally agreed to encompass 1500 BCE to 1100 BCE.

== Machalilla Culture ==
The Machalilla were an agricultural people who also pursued fishing, hunting and gathering. Like many prehistoric cultures of coastal Ecuador, the people practiced artificial cranial deformation by using stones to flatten and lengthen their skulls.

Archaeologists focus on the unusual cemeteries of the Machalilla, in which bodies were settled beneath a ceramic turtle shell, and on their ceramic work in general, which represented artistic and technological advances in the art. Grave sites located beneath the remains of Machalilla houses, without evidence of grave goods, have also been found. The Machalilla are credited with adding to the ceramic bottle the stirrup spout, in which two spouts join into one opening: an invention that would be prominent in northwest South American pottery for centuries. Archaeologists have also excavated ceramic pots, human figurines, pitchers, whistles, and candlesticks from Machalilla digs. In terms of tools, fishhooks, stone saws, and a grinding stone have also been discovered.

== Time frame ==
The date range of the culture is obscured. It is sometimes listed as early as 1800 BCE and as late as 800 BCE. One of the problems with determining the proper date range is the method of cultural termination. According to archaeologists Betty Meggers and Clifford Evans, the Machalilla culture was altered by Mesoamerican contact until it blended into the Chorrera culture.

Universidad de Especialidades Espíritu Santo UEES in Guayaquil, Ecuador has a collection of Machalilla artifacts.

== See also ==
- Valdivia culture

== Sources and external links ==
- Exploring Ecuador: Machalilla (English)
- Ceramica Machalilla (Spanish)
- Machalilla - Casa del alabado, Quito-Ecuador (English)
- Machalilla - Museo Chileno de Arte Precolombino (English)
