= Casitahua =

Dormant volcano in Ecuador

Coordinates: 0.0288°S 78.4882°W

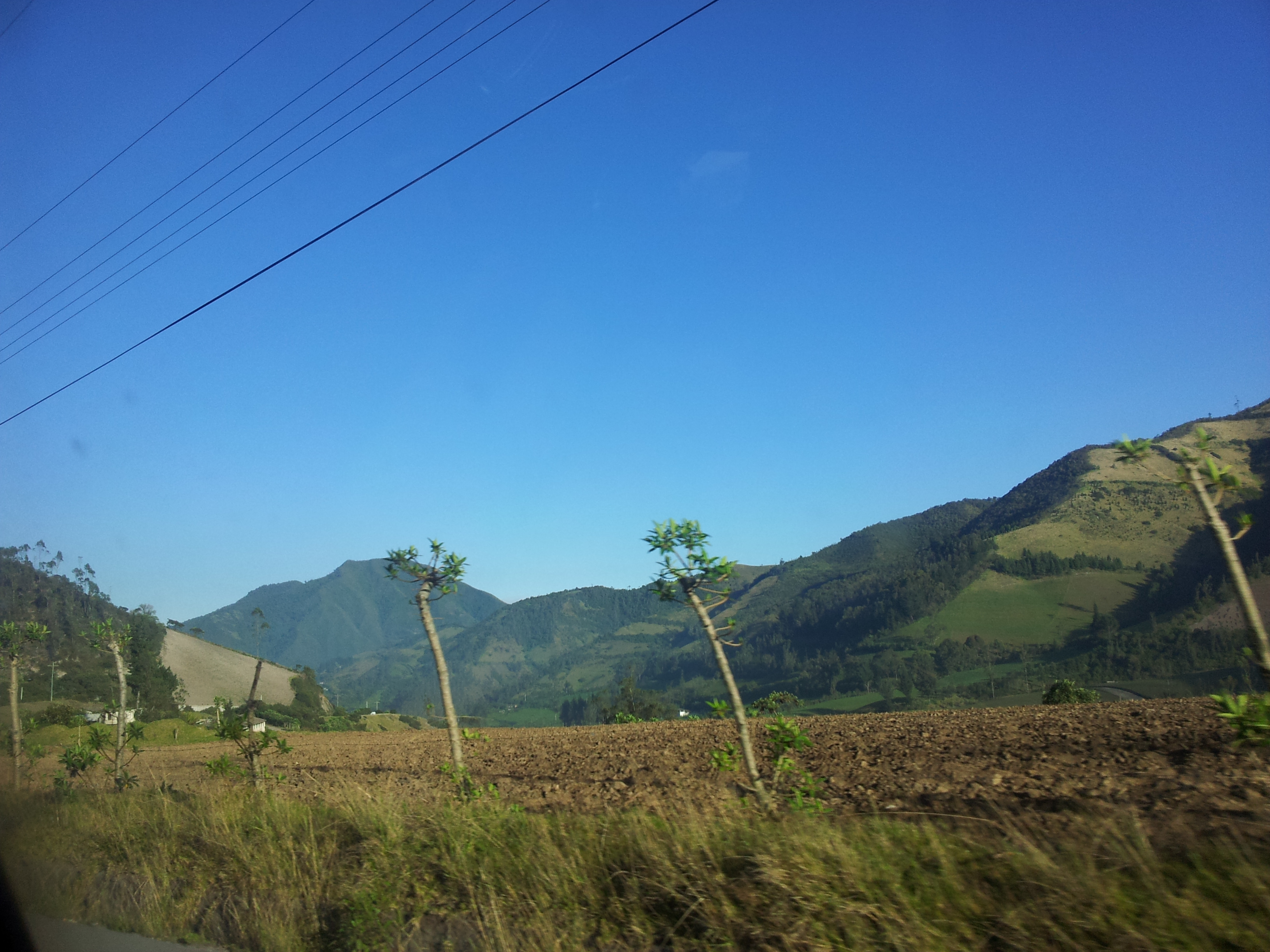
A panorama of Casitahua

Casitahua (less frequent spelling: Casitagua) is a dormant, eroded stratovolcano in the north of Quito Canton, Pichincha Province, Ecuador, with a height of 11,486 feet (3,501 m). The volcano is in the Western Cordillera of the northern Ecuadorian Andes, between Pululagua Volcano to the north and Pichincha Volcano approximately to the southwest. Casitahua's caldera is open approximately towards the west-northwest. The volcano has last been active in the Pleistocene era.

Casitahua is surrounded by the urban parishes El Condado and Cotocollao of the city of Quito to the south, and by the rural parishes Calacalí to the northwest and San Antonio to the east.

In 2022 the body of lawyer María Belén Bernal was found ten days after she disappeared on the slopes of Casitahua.
