= Catequilla =

Archaeological site in Ecuador

Coordinates: 0°0′0″N 78°25′43.3″W

- Kati-Killa
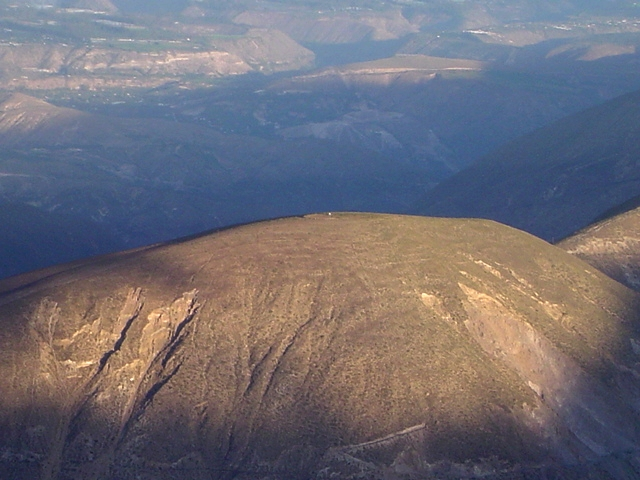
- Aerial view of the Cerro de Catequilla, archaeological site at the summit
- Interactive map of Catequilla
- Type: Archaeological site
- Cultures: Quitu-Cara
- Location: Pomasqui Valley
- Region: Ecuador

History
- Built: 800

Site notes
- Material: Stone
- Elevation: 2,638 m (8,655 ft)
- Height: 25 cm (9.8 in)
- Length: 107 m (351 ft)
- Diameter: 68 m (223 ft)
- Archaeologists: Oswaldo Tovar

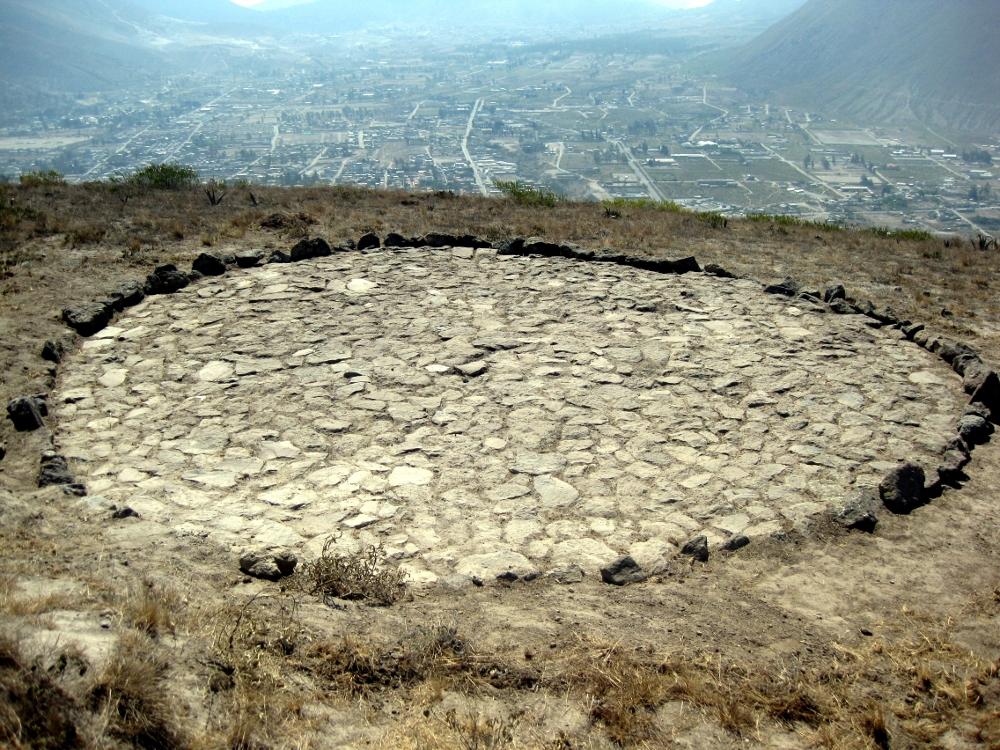
Pre-Columbian lithic disk

Monte Catequilla (also Kati-Killa) is an archaeological site in the Pomasqui Valley of Ecuador. Located in the Parish of San Antonio of Quito Canton in Pichincha Province, it has an elevation of 2,638 metres (8,655 ft) and is located on a mountaintop about 300 metres (980 ft) above valleys on either side. Attributed to the Pre-Columbian era Quitu-Cara culture, it was presumably used as an astronomical observatory even before the arrival of the Incas, and is the only prehispanic site in the Americas that is located precisely at the Earth's Equator.

== History ==
Catequilla is translated from Quechua to mean "follower of the moon". Its construction, circa 800 AD, is attributed to the Quitu-Cara culture. The site consists of a semicircular wall, 107 metres (351 ft) in length with a diameter of 68 metres (223 ft), although no clear architectural features accurately show the exact positions of its ends. It leans toward the east end south sides with at an azimuth of 113 degrees, and declines on the western end to the north side, with an azimuth of 293 degrees. The wall height varies between 25 centimetres (9.8 in) and 1.2 metres (3 ft 11 in), but based on the broken material beside it, the wall could have been more than 2 metres (6 ft 7 in) high. In the northwest of the site, there is a lithic disk (a circular stone-filled platform) 8 metres (26 ft) in diameter, consisting mainly of stone masonry. It has three lines of stones. Situated on a hill, there was a water source at the site at one time.

Along with the stone-filled circles of Jarata and Pacpo to the south, it forms a straight line along which the shade from the mountains falls during the June solstice. While many of the indigenous people today believe that the purpose of these circles was to provide a solid flat surface for the threshing of wheat and other cereals, several astronomic and geodetic alignments have been detected, questioning the validity of this theory. After several archaeological excavations by Oswaldo Tovar, many ceramics were unearthed from Incan and colonial times. Though the site is virtually abandoned, nearby mining operations in the area could jeopardize its integrity. Even so, the government has taken no action. As it is located on the equator, it is said to be in the "Middle of the World". As of 2011, it is said to be "the only important pre-Inca site in Ecuador to have been commercially exploited."

The Inca pucara (stone fortress) of Rumicucho is located about 1,550 metres (5,090 ft) north of Catequilla.
