= Calacalí =

- Rural parish

- Location within Ecuador
- Coordinates: 0°00′00″S 78°30′53″W
- Country: Ecuador
- Province: Pichincha
- Canton: Quito
- Time zone: UTC-5 (ECT)
- Area code: 593 2

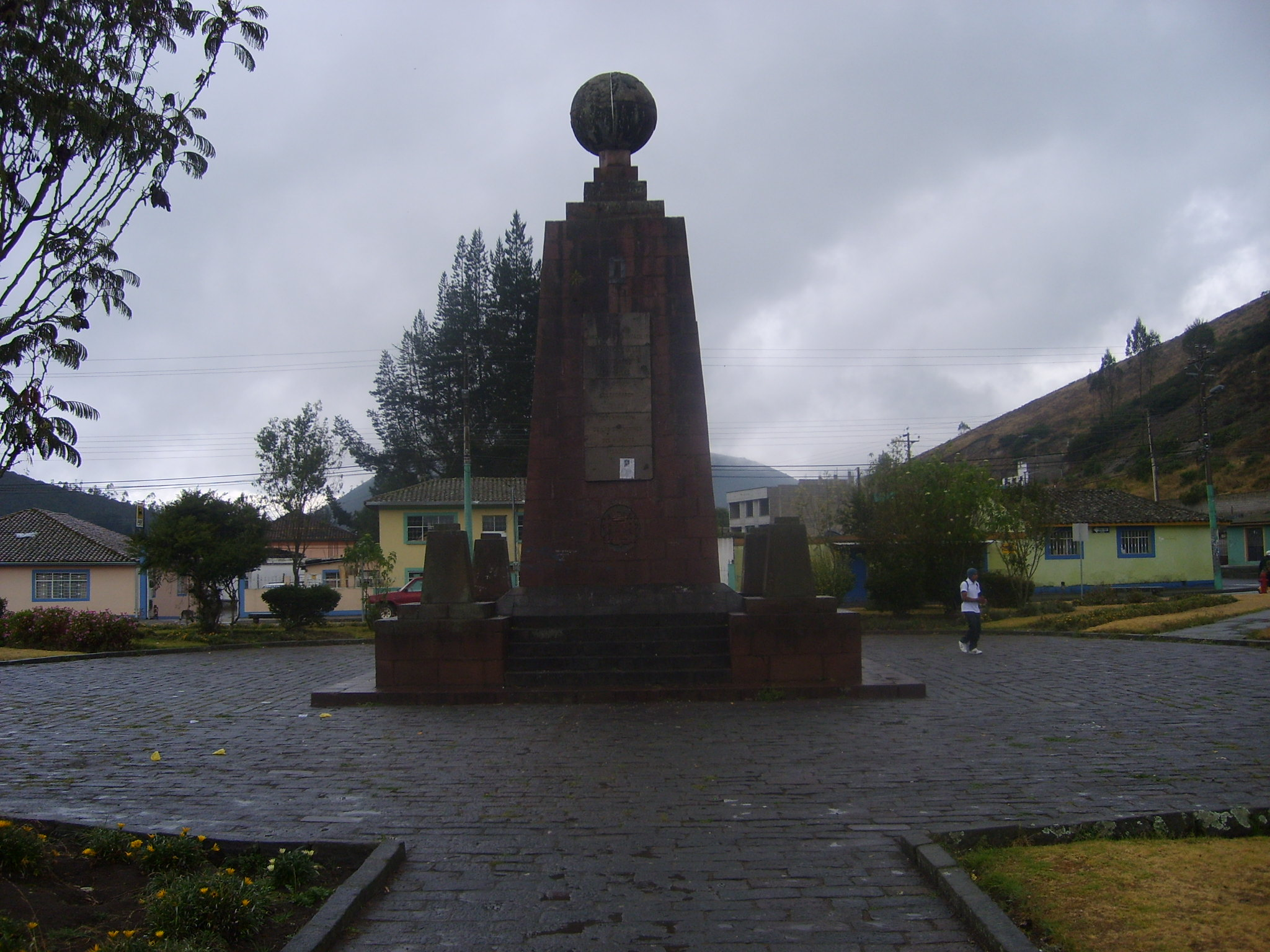
Equator monument in the central square of Calacalí

Calacalí is a rural parish of Quito Canton, Pichincha Province, Ecuador. It is northwest of Casitagua Volcano and southwest of Pululagua Volcano.

In the central square of Calacalí there is an equator monument. A similar, larger equator monument is in Ciudad Mitad del Mundo.

Calacalí is the first village of the eastern end of a road known as Carretera Calacalí-La Independencia.
