= Bomarea borjae =

Conservation status
- Data Deficient (IUCN 3.1)

Scientific classification
- Kingdom: Plantae
- Clade: Tracheophytes
- Clade: Angiosperms
- Clade: Monocots
- Order: Liliales
- Family: Alstroemeriaceae
- Genus: Bomarea
- Species: B. borjae

Binomial name
- Bomarea borjae Sodiro

Species of flowering plant

Bomarea borjae is a species of flowering plant in the family Alstroemeriaceae. It is endemic to Ecuador. It is known only from two collections made in the caldera of the dormant volcano Pululagua over 100 years ago. It is not a well-known species and is threatened by habitat loss.
