= Critoniopsis nonoensis =

Conservation status
- Endangered (IUCN 3.1)

Scientific classification
- Kingdom: Plantae
- Clade: Tracheophytes
- Clade: Angiosperms
- Clade: Eudicots
- Clade: Asterids
- Order: Asterales
- Family: Asteraceae
- Genus: Critoniopsis
- Species: C. nonoensis

Binomial name
- Critoniopsis nonoensis (Benoist) H.Rob.

Synonyms
- Vernonia nonoensis Benoist

Species of flowering plant

Critoniopsis nonoensis is a species of flowering plant in the family Asteraceae. It is a shrub known from a single collection near Nono in Pichincha Province, where it grows in high Andean tropical moist montane forest from 2,000 to 2,500 metres elevation.

The species was first described as Vernonia nonoensis by Raymond Benoist in 1937. In 1999 Harold E. Robinson placed the species in genus Critoniopsis as C. nonoensis.
