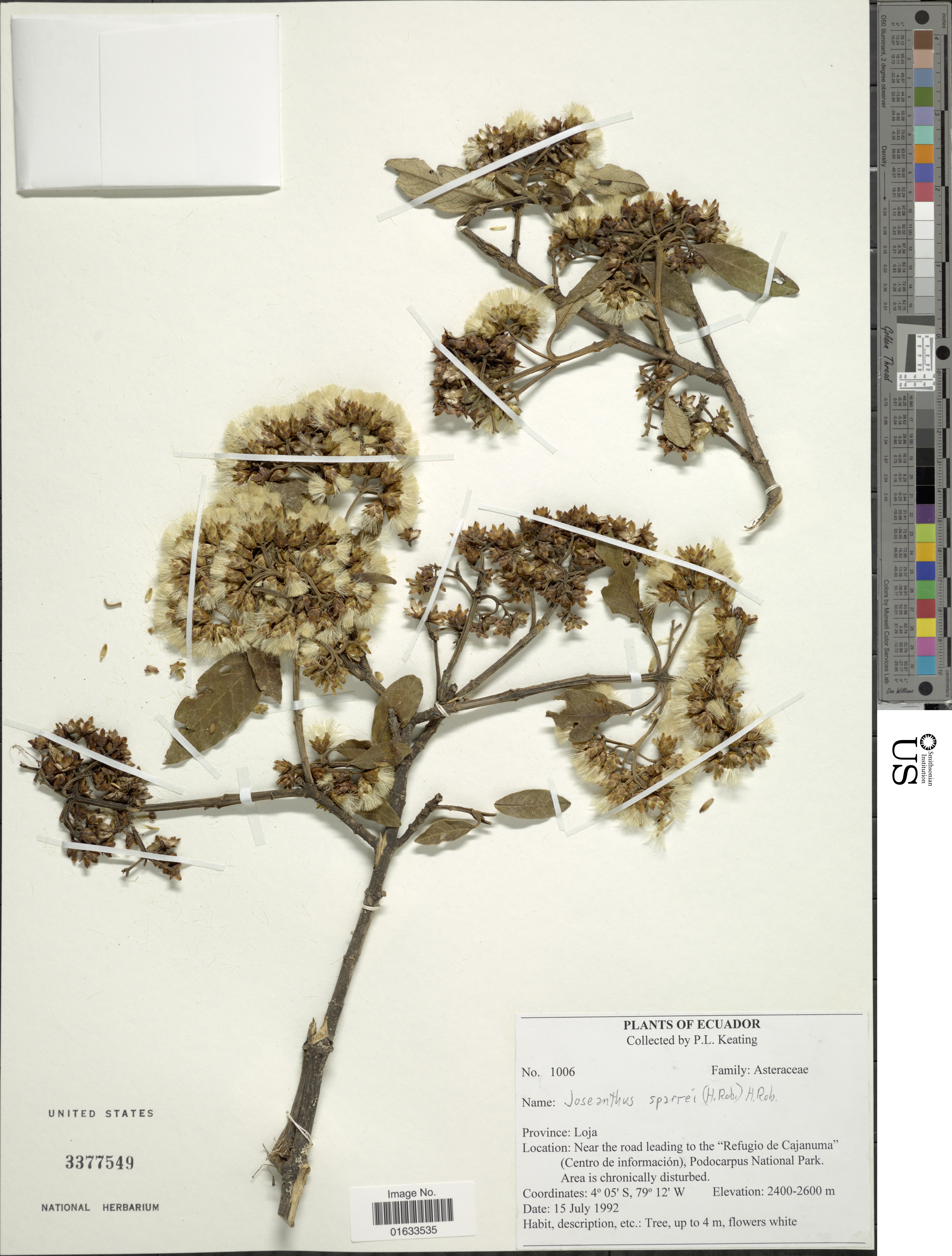

Scientific classification
- Kingdom: Plantae
- Clade: Embryophytes
- Clade: Tracheophytes
- Clade: Spermatophytes
- Clade: Angiosperms
- Clade: Eudicots
- Clade: Asterids
- Order: Asterales
- Family: Asteraceae
- Subfamily: Vernonioideae
- Tribe: Vernonieae
- Genus: Joseanthus; H.Rob.

Type species
- Joseanthus cuatrecasasii H.Rob.

= Joseanthus =

Genus of flowering plants

Joseanthus is a genus of South American flowering plants in the family Asteraceae.

Species

- Joseanthus chimborazensis - Ecuador
- Joseanthus crassilanatus - Ecuador
- Joseanthus cuatrecasasii - Ecuador
- Joseanthus sparrei - Ecuador
- Joseanthus trichotomus - Colombia
