= San Antonio de Pichincha =

Rural parish of Quito Canton

Coordinates: 0.00824°S 78.445129°W

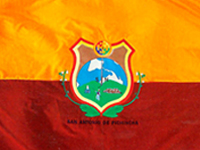
Flag of San Antonio de Pichincha

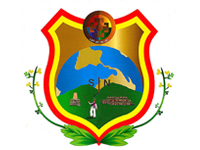
Coat of Arms of San Antonio de Pichincha

San Antonio de Pichincha, or simply San Antonio and less frequently by the older name San Antonio de Lulumpamba (alternate spelling: Lulumbamba), is a rural parish of Quito Canton, Pichincha Province, Ecuador. The seat of the parish lies in an arid plain with sandy soil known as Lulumpamba. The Quechua language name of the plain means plain of fruit(s). It is southeast of Pululahua (Pululagua) Volcano and east of Casitagua Volcano. In the village there is also a Lulumpamba street named after the plain.

In San Antonio there is a textile factory known as La Internacional. To the west of the village there is an ethnographic museum near the equator in a touristic place known as Ciudad Mitad del Mundo and which is owned by the Prefecture of Pichincha. There is also a go-karting place known as Cartódromo Dos Hemisferios.

The Inca pucara (stone fortress) of Rumicucho is located at the eastern edge of the city.

== Climate ==
Climate data for San Antonio de Pichincha, elevation 2,430 m (7,970 ft), (1961–1990)
Month	Jan	Feb	Mar	Apr	May	Jun	Jul	Aug	Sep	Oct	Nov	Dec	Year
Mean daily maximum °C (°F)	23.1 (73.6)	23.2 (73.8)	22.5 (72.5)	22.2 (72.0)	22.5 (72.5)	23.5 (74.3)	24.2 (75.6)	24.6 (76.3)	24.5 (76.1)	23.7 (74.7)	24.0 (75.2)	23.6 (74.5)	23.5 (74.3)
Daily mean °C (°F)	15.3 (59.5)	15.5 (59.9)	15.6 (60.1)	15.6 (60.1)	15.6 (60.1)	15.5 (59.9)	15.3 (59.5)	15.6 (60.1)	15.6 (60.1)	15.3 (59.5)	15.3 (59.5)	15.5 (59.9)	15.5 (59.9)
Mean daily minimum °C (°F)	10.1 (50.2)	10.3 (50.5)	11.0 (51.8)	11.0 (51.8)	10.3 (50.5)	8.8 (47.8)	8.0 (46.4)	7.9 (46.2)	8.6 (47.5)	9.3 (48.7)	9.5 (49.1)	9.6 (49.3)	9.5 (49.2)
Average precipitation mm (inches)	36.0 (1.42)	48.0 (1.89)	55.0 (2.17)	68.0 (2.68)	46.0 (1.81)	22.0 (0.87)	7.0 (0.28)	11.0 (0.43)	33.0 (1.30)	48.0 (1.89)	40.0 (1.57)	35.0 (1.38)	449 (17.69)
Source: FAO
