= Rumicucho =

Archaeological site in Ecuador

- Location within Ecuador
- 0°00′43″N 78°25′53″W
- Type: Fort and Settlement
- Location: Ecuador

History
- Built: c. 1480s CE

Site notes
- Condition: In ruins

Rumicucho or Pucara de Rumicucho is an archaeological site of the Inca Empire in the parroquia of San Antonio de Pichincha, in Quito Canton, Pichincha Province. Ecuador. Rumicucho is a pucara (hilltop fortress) located 23 kilometres (14 mi) in a straight-line distance north of the city of Quito at an elevation of 2,401 metres (7,877 ft). Rumicucho in the Quechua language means "stone corner", perhaps referring to its strategic location between the territory of the Yumbo people to the east and the chiefdoms of the Pais Caranqui to the north.

The Incas probably built Rumicucho between 1480 and 1500 and ruled this area until the Spanish conquest in the 1530s.

Rumicucho has also been called Lulumbamba (fertile plain), a reference to the valley to its west, now mostly urbanized but formerly intensely cultivated. Rumicucho is a popular site for tourists to visit.

== Background ==
Rumicucho is one of more than 100 known pucaras in northern Ecuador, far more than in any other region of the Inca Empire which indicates the severity of the resistance by the local people to the advance northward by the Incas. Many of the pucaras were built by the Indigenous people long before the Inca Empire. The Incas established or strengthened existing pucaras as bases to conquer the chiefdoms of the Pais Caranqui of whom the Cayambe may have been the most powerful. The Inca war against the Pais Caranqui lasted for years, possibly two or three decades. The Inca conquest of northern Ecuador was not completed until the early 16th century.

== Description ==
The archaeological site occupies an area 380 metres (1,250 ft) long and 75 metres (246 ft) wide. The site was probably occupied by pre-Inca cultures, with the Incas adding their customary styles to the existing buildings and walls.

Unlike many pucaras Rumicucho is not on a high point of the landscape, but rather is located on a small hill. Its setting identifies it as a crossroads as well as being a fortress. Rumicucho is one of the few pucaras in Ecuador where a substantial amount of Inca material has been found, including domestic items such as cloth, ceramic pots for making Chicha, the fermented Inca drink, implements made of camelid bone, seashells, and metal objects. Rumicucho was a multi-functional base for residence and ceremonies and control of transit and trade as well as defense.

The archaeological site consists of 5 terraces stair-stepping up the hill, each with its own particular purpose. The first and second terraces were used for rituals and feasts; the third terrace was for ceremonies, and terraces one and two were probably used for housing and workshops.

Rumicucho was also probably used for astronomy and to observe solar events. It is about 1 kilometre (0.62 mi) from the equator and lines up precisely with the snow-capped volcanoes Cayambe 50 kilometres (31 mi) east and Cotopaxi, 80 kilometres (50 mi) to the south, suggesting that it was a sacred site. The Incas and pre-Inca peoples had an extensive knowledge of astronomy and often located their installations in places appropriate for observations of solar events, including the equatorial solstice, which they called "the day when man has no shadow."
