= Pululahua Geobotanical Reserve =

Coordinates: 0°02′17″N 78°27′47″W

Reserva Geobotánica Pululahua (Pululahua Geobotanical Reserve) (Cloud of Water Geobontanical Reserve) is a protected area around Pululahua Volcano in the north of Quito Canton, Pichincha Province, Ecuador. It is 17 km north of Quito, in the northwestern part of the Pomasqui Valley. The most notable feature of this site is "el cráter de Pululahua", which is one of only two volcanic craters in the world inhabited by humans (and the only one that is farmed). Often, this reserve is shrouded in a thick layer of clouds or fog. The land here is extremely fertile because it is volcanic (igneous) soil and, as mentioned earlier, is used to cultivate crops.

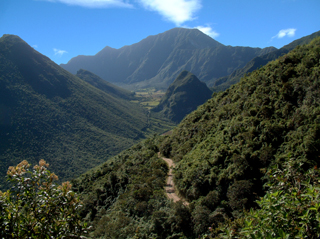
Road entrance to Pululahua Geobotanical Reserve
