= Critoniopsis dorrii =

Conservation status
- Endangered (IUCN 3.1)

Scientific classification
- Kingdom: Plantae
- Clade: Tracheophytes
- Clade: Angiosperms
- Clade: Eudicots
- Clade: Asterids
- Order: Asterales
- Family: Asteraceae
- Genus: Critoniopsis
- Species: C. dorrii

Binomial name
- Critoniopsis dorrii H.Rob.

Species of flowering plant

Critoniopsis dorrii is a species of flowering plant in the family Asteraceae. It is a shrub or tree native to Azuay Province of Ecuador. Its natural habitat is subtropical or tropical moist montane forests. It is threatened by habitat loss.
