= Critoniopsis sodiroi =

Conservation status
- Near Threatened (IUCN 3.1)

Scientific classification
- Kingdom: Plantae
- Clade: Embryophytes
- Clade: Tracheophytes
- Clade: Spermatophytes
- Clade: Angiosperms
- Clade: Eudicots
- Clade: Asterids
- Order: Asterales
- Family: Asteraceae
- Genus: Critoniopsis
- Species: C. sodiroi

Binomial name
- Critoniopsis sodiroi (Hieron.) H.Rob.

Synonyms
- List: Critoniopsis pichinchensis (Cuatrec.) H.Rob. in Phytologia 46: 440 (1980); Piptocarpha sodiroi Hieron. ex Sodiro in Bot. Jahrb. Syst. 29: 2 (1900); Vernonia johnstuttsii G.Lom.Sm. in Fl. Neotrop. Monogr. 99: 80 (2007); Vernonia pichinchensis Cuatrec. in Bot. Jahrb. Syst. 77: 76 (1956)

Species of flowering plant

Critoniopsis sodiroi is a species of flowering plant in the family Asteraceae. It is found only in Ecuador. Its natural habitat is subtropical or tropical moist montane forests. It is threatened by habitat loss.

The specific epithet of sodiroi refers to Luis Sodiro (1836–1909), who was an Italian Jesuit priest and a field botanist, who collected many plants in Ecuador.

It was first published in Phytologia vol.69 on page 105 in 1990.
