= Guayllabamba =

Coordinates: 0.059052°S 78.341446°W

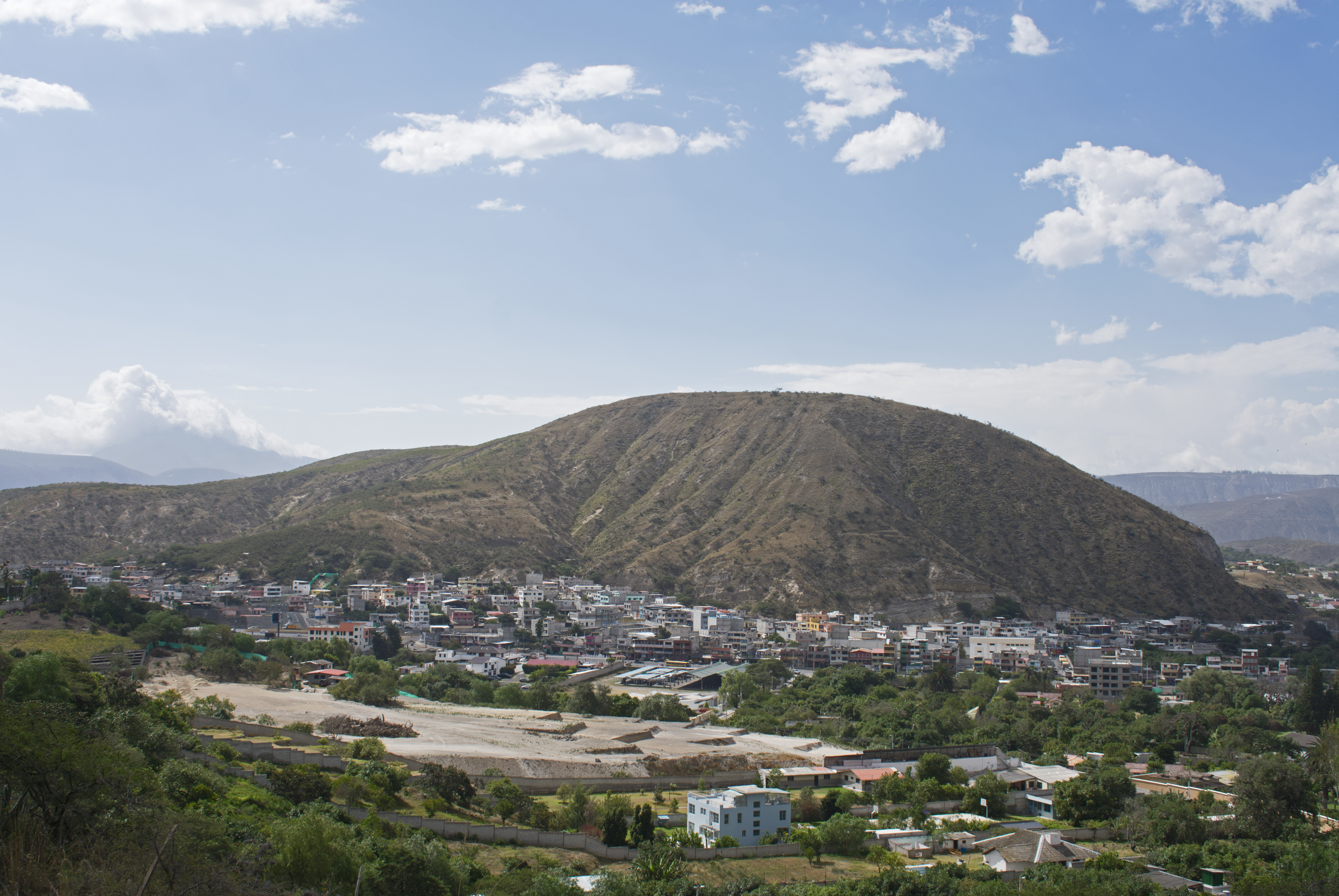
View of La Concepcion from Quito Zoo

Guayllabamba (Kichwa: Wayllapampa, "green plain") is a small agricultural town (administratively, a rural parish of the canton of Quito) located 29 kilometers northeast of the city of Quito in northern Ecuador. In the 2001 census, the parish had a population of 12,227. The elevation is 2,142 metres (7,028 ft) above sea level.

The Zoológico de Quito (Quito Zoo), originally in the Benalcázar parish of Quito, was moved in 1997 to the southwest of the parish. The zoo is the largest in Ecuador.

Guayllabamba is located on Ecuador Highway 28B, which connects it with Quito and Cayambe.
