= Lloa =

Coordinates: 0.244°S 78.588°W

Lloa is a rural parish of Quito Canton, Pichincha Province, Ecuador. The seat of the parish, which is the village of Lloa, lies west of the southern part of the city of Quito and approximately southeast of Guagua Pichincha Volcano, surrounded by some foothills of the Pichincha Volcano.
