= Pomasqui Valley =

Valley in Ecuador

Coordinates: 0°0′0″N 78°25′43.3″W

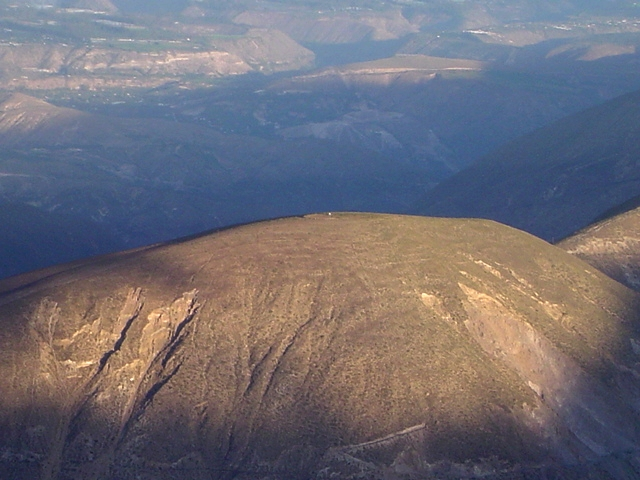
Cerro de Catequilla, looming above the valley

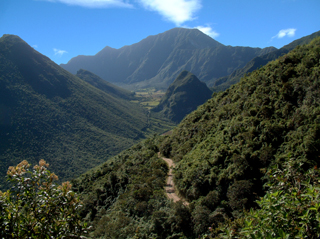
Road entrance to Pululahua Geobotanical Reserve

Pomasqui Valley is a valley on the northern outskirts of Quito, Ecuador. It is located on the equator, the so-called "Mitad del Mundo" ("Middle of the World"), at an altitude of around 2,600 metres (8,500 ft) above sea level. Hot and semi-arid, it is formed by a river tributary. The valley contains the Cerro de Catequilla, which contains the pre-Columbian astronomical observatory, Catequilla. The village of Pomasqui itself lies roughly 6 kilometres (3.7 mi) from the equator. The Monjas River flows nearby and the valley is an important centre for viniculture in Ecuador, with vineyards. The economy features vegetable and fruit production. To the northwest is the Pululahua Geobotanical Reserve.

== History ==
The valley played an important role in military conflict as the Spanish army under Benalcazar invaded in 1534. Atahualpa leaders such as Rumiñahui and Quizquiz led organized attacks against the invading Spanish, and some 4000 locals were slaughtered by them here for giving in to the invaders.
