= Critoniopsis =

Scientific classification
- Kingdom: Plantae
- Clade: Tracheophytes
- Clade: Angiosperms
- Clade: Eudicots
- Clade: Asterids
- Order: Asterales
- Family: Asteraceae
- Subfamily: Vernonioideae
- Tribe: Vernonieae
- Genus: Critoniopsis; Sch.Bip.

Synonyms
- Cuatrecasanthus H.Rob.; Joseanthus H.Rob.; Tephrothamnus Sch.Bip.

Genus of flowering plants

Critoniopsis is a genus of flowering plants in the family Asteraceae. It includes 87 species native to Mexico, Andean South America, and southern and southeastern Brazil.

== Species ==
87 species are accepted.

- Critoniopsis aristeguietae (Cuatrec.) H.Rob.
- Critoniopsis augustiniana (Cuatrec.) H.Rob. & V.A.Funk
- Critoniopsis autumnalis (McVaugh) H.Rob.
- Critoniopsis ayabacensis Sagást. & M.O.Dillon
- Critoniopsis bitriflora (Cuatrec.) H.Rob.
- Critoniopsis boekei Aguilar-Cano & Loeuille
- Critoniopsis bogotana (Cuatrec.) H.Rob.
- Critoniopsis boliviana (Britton) H.Rob.
- Critoniopsis brachystephana (Cuatrec.) H.Rob.
- Critoniopsis bradeana (G.M.Barroso) G.Soares & Loeuille
- Critoniopsis cajamarcensis (Cuatrec.) H.Rob.
- Critoniopsis canaliculata M.Monge & Semir
- Critoniopsis cerulosa Haro-Carr. & H.Rob.
- Critoniopsis chimborazensis (Hieron.) Aguilar-Cano & Loeuille
- Critoniopsis choquetangensis H.Rob.
- Critoniopsis cinerea S.Díaz & Obando
- Critoniopsis concolor H.Rob. & V.A.Funk
- Critoniopsis cotopaxensis H.Rob.
- Critoniopsis cuatrecasasii H.Rob.
- Critoniopsis diazii H.Rob.
- Critoniopsis dorrii H.Rob.
- Critoniopsis duncanii (S.B.Jones) H.Rob.
- Critoniopsis elbertiana (Cuatrec.) H.Rob.
- Critoniopsis flexipappa (Gleason) Aguilar-Cano & Loeuille
- Critoniopsis floribunda (Kunth) H.Rob.
  - Critoniopsis floribunda var. sevillana (Cuatrec.) Haro-Carr. & H.Rob. (synonym Critoniopsis sevillana (Cuatrec.) H.Rob.
- Critoniopsis franciscana (Cuatrec.) H.Rob.
- Critoniopsis giannasii (Stutts) Aguilar-Cano & Loeuille
- Critoniopsis glandulata (Cuatrec.) H.Rob.
- Critoniopsis gynoxiifolia H.Rob.
- Critoniopsis harlingii (H.Rob.) H.Rob.
- Critoniopsis huairacajana (Hieron.) H.Rob.
- Critoniopsis huilensis (Cuatrec.) H.Rob.
- Critoniopsis jalcana (Cuatrec.) H.Rob.
- Critoniopsis jaramilloi Pruski & H.Rob.
- Critoniopsis jelskii (Hieron.) H.Rob.
- Critoniopsis jubifera (Rusby) H.Rob.
- Critoniopsis killipii (Cuatrec.) H.Rob.
- Critoniopsis kingii (H.Rob. & V.A.Funk) Aguilar-Cano & Loeuille
- Critoniopsis lanceolatus (H.Rob. & V.A.Funk) Aguilar-Cano & Loeuille
- Critoniopsis lewisii H.Rob.
- Critoniopsis lindenii Sch.Bip.
- Critoniopsis macphersonii (S.B.Jones & Stutts) H.Rob.
- Critoniopsis macrofoliata H.Rob.
- Critoniopsis magdalenae (G.M.Barroso) H.Rob.
- Critoniopsis meridensis (V.M.Badillo) V.M.Badillo
- Critoniopsis mucida (Cuatrec.) H.Rob.
- Critoniopsis narinoensis H.Rob. & S.C.Keeley
- Critoniopsis nonoensis (Benoist) H.Rob.
- Critoniopsis oblongifolia Sagást. & M.O.Dillon
- Critoniopsis occidentalis (Cuatrec.) H.Rob.
- Critoniopsis palaciosii H.Rob.
- Critoniopsis pallida (Cuatrec.) H.Rob.
- Critoniopsis paradoxa (Sch.Bip.) V.M.Badillo
- Critoniopsis paucartambensis (M.O.Dillon) H.Rob.
- Critoniopsis pendula (Cuatrec.) H.Rob.
- Critoniopsis persetosa Haro-Carr. & H.Rob.
- Critoniopsis peruviana (Cuatrec.) H.Rob.
- Critoniopsis popayanensis (Cuatrec.) H.Rob.
- Critoniopsis pycnantha (Benth.) H.Rob.
- Critoniopsis quillonensis H.Rob.
- Critoniopsis quinqueflora (Less.) H.Rob.
- Critoniopsis sagasteguii (M.O.Dillon) H.Rob.
- Critoniopsis sandemanii (H.Rob. & B.Kahn) Aguilar-Cano & Loeuille
- Critoniopsis sodiroi (Hieron.) H.Rob.
- Critoniopsis sodiroioides H.Rob. & V.A.Funk
- Critoniopsis sparrei (H.Rob.) Aguilar-Cano & Loeuille
- Critoniopsis steinbachii H.Rob.
- Critoniopsis stellata (Spreng.) H.Rob.
- Critoniopsis suaveolens (Kunth) H.Rob.
- Critoniopsis tamana (Kunth) H.Rob.
- Critoniopsis tausae H.Rob. & S.C.Keeley
- Critoniopsis trichotoma (Gleason) Aguilar-Cano & Loeuille
- Critoniopsis tungurahuae (Benoist) H.Rob.
- Critoniopsis turmalensis V.M.Badillo
- Critoniopsis unguiculata (Cuatrec.) H.Rob.
- Critoniopsis uniflosculosa (Cuatrec.) H.Rob.
- Critoniopsis uribei H.Rob.
- Critoniopsis ursicola (Cuatrec.) H.Rob.
- Critoniopsis vivarii H.Rob. & V.A.Funk
- Critoniopsis weberbaueri (Hieron.) H.Rob.
- Critoniopsis woytkowskii (S.B.Jones) H.Rob.
- Critoniopsis yamboyensis (Benoist) H.Rob.
- Critoniopsis yungasensis (Britton) H.Rob.
- Critoniopsis zamorensis Haro-Carr. & H.Rob.
- Critoniopsis zarucchii H.Rob.
