= Critoniopsis chimborazensis =

Conservation status
- Endangered (IUCN 3.1)

Scientific classification
- Kingdom: Plantae
- Clade: Tracheophytes
- Clade: Angiosperms
- Clade: Eudicots
- Clade: Asterids
- Order: Asterales
- Family: Asteraceae
- Genus: Critoniopsis
- Species: C. chimborazensis

Binomial name
- Critoniopsis chimborazensis (Hieron.) Aguilar-Cano & Loeuille

Synonyms
- Joseanthus chimborazensis (Hieron.) H.Rob.; Joseanthus crassilanatus (Cuatrec.) H.Rob.; Vernonia chimborazensis Hieron.; Vernonia crassilanata Cuatrec.; Vernonia neogleasoniana Cuatrec.

Species of flowering plant

Critoniopsis chimborazensis is a species of flowering plant in the family Asteraceae. It is a scrambling shrub or tree native to southern Colombia and Ecuador. It is native to upper montane moist forests and páramo (high-elevation grassland) in the Andes from 2,700 to 3,400 metres elevation.
