= Ciudad Mitad del Mundo =

Monument park in Ecuador

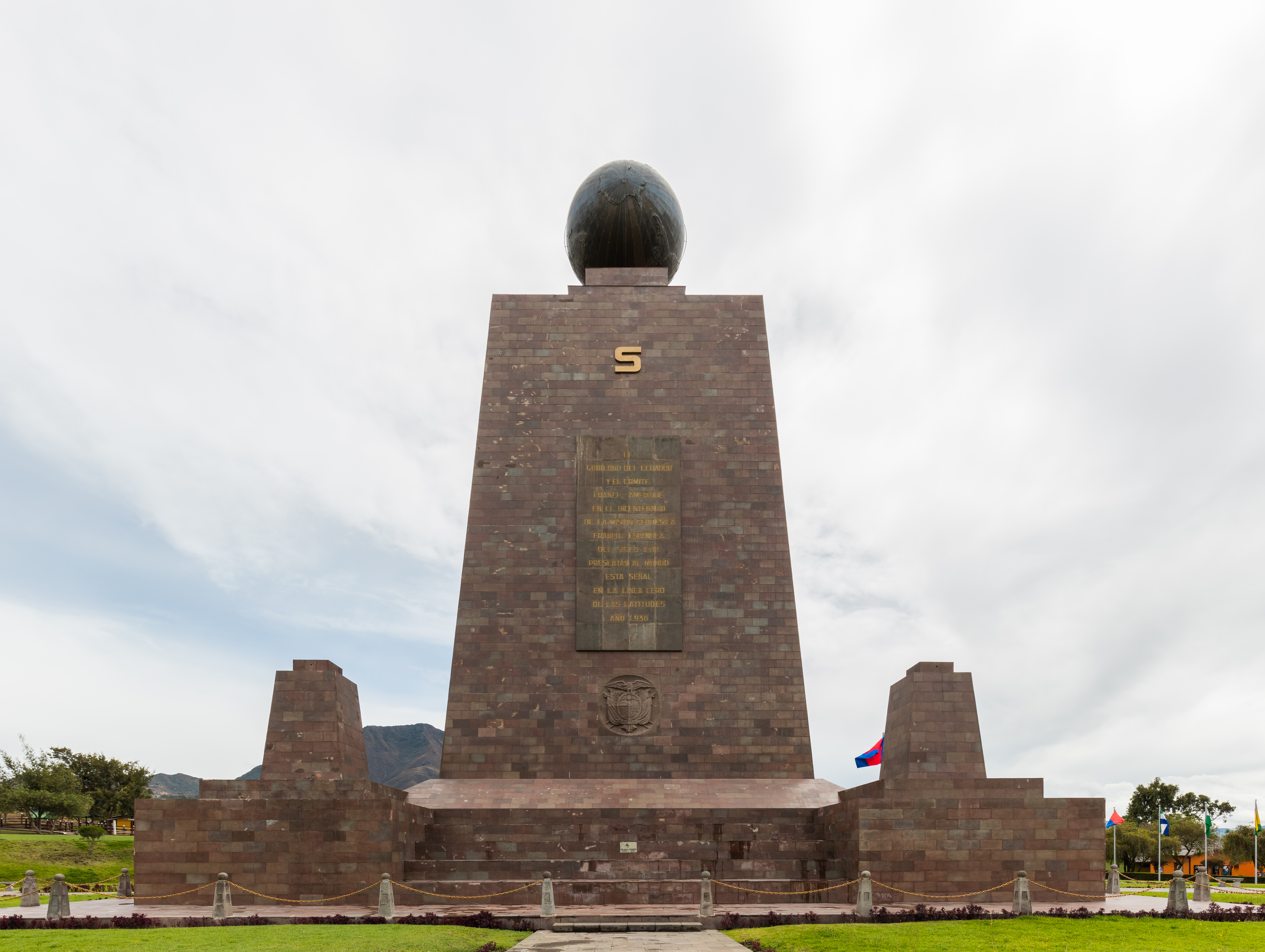
- The Monument to the Equator (Monumento a la Mitad del Mundo)
- Interactive map of Ciudad Mitad del Mundo
- Type: Museum park and monument
- Location: San Antonio parish, Quito, Ecuador
- Coordinates: 0°00′08″S 78°27′21″W
- Operator: Prefecture of Pichincha
- Status: Open all year

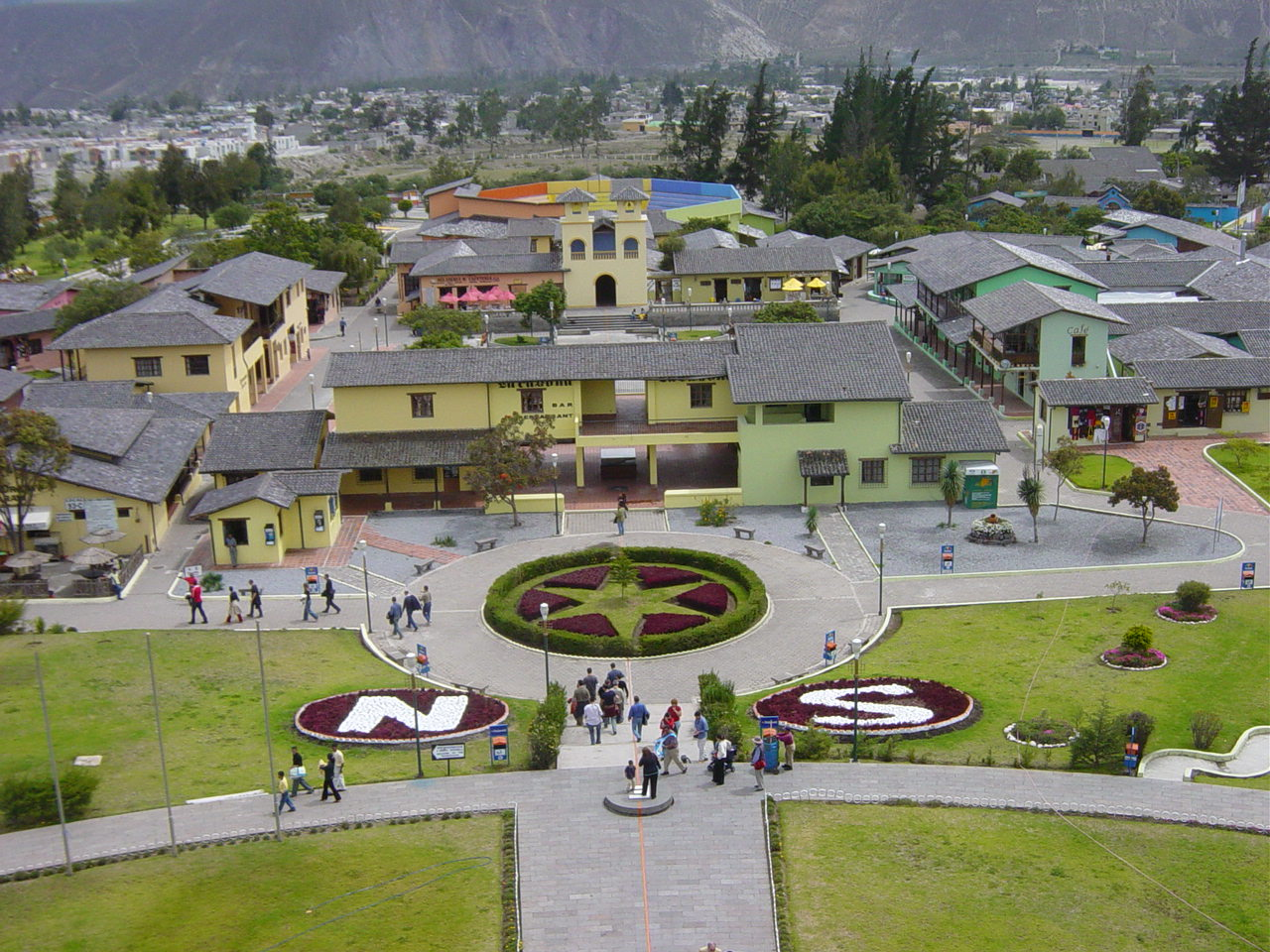
Ciudad Mitad del Mundo as seen from the west from the 30-meter-high terrace of the museum

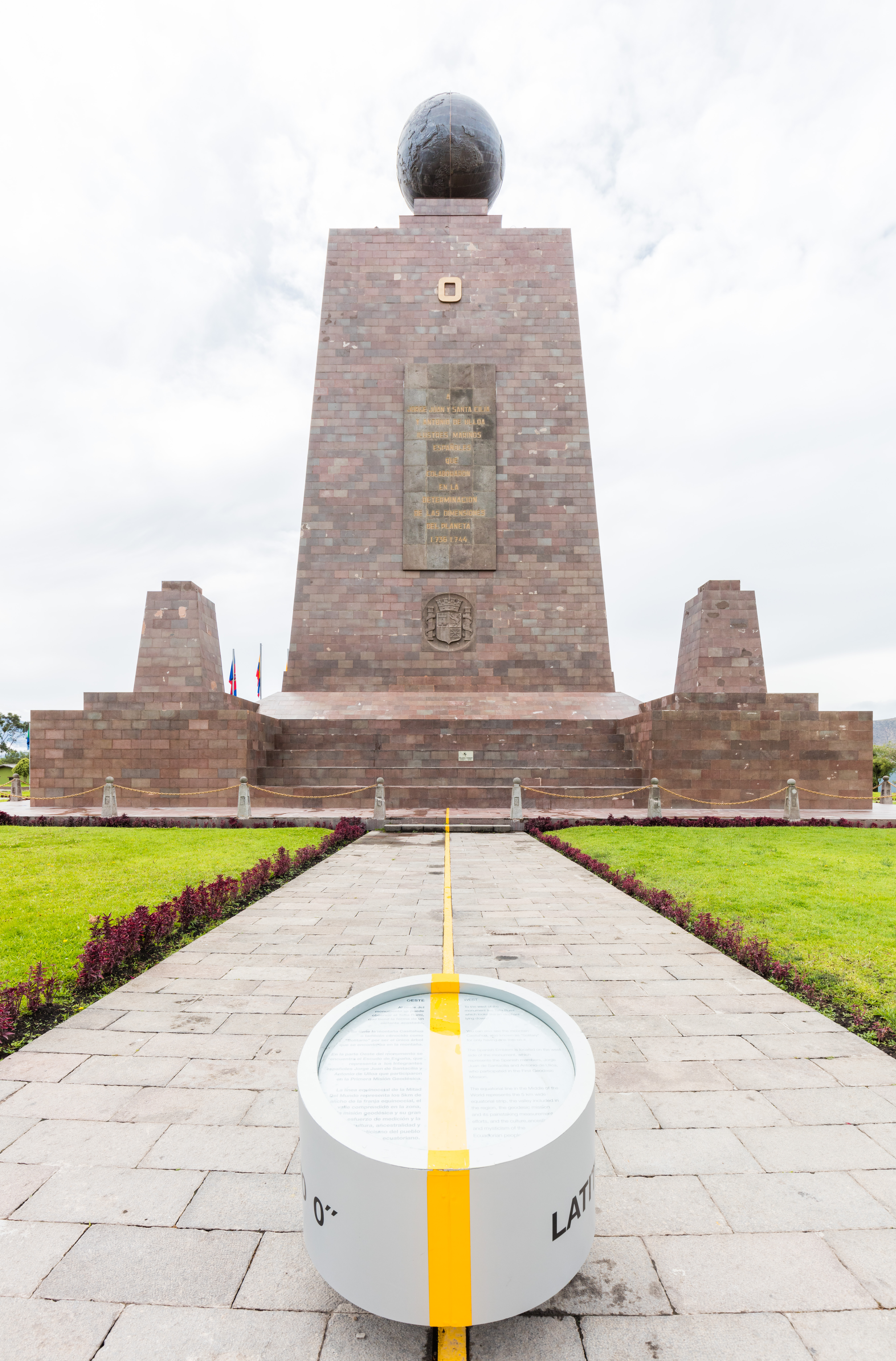
The yellow line divides the 2 hemispheres.

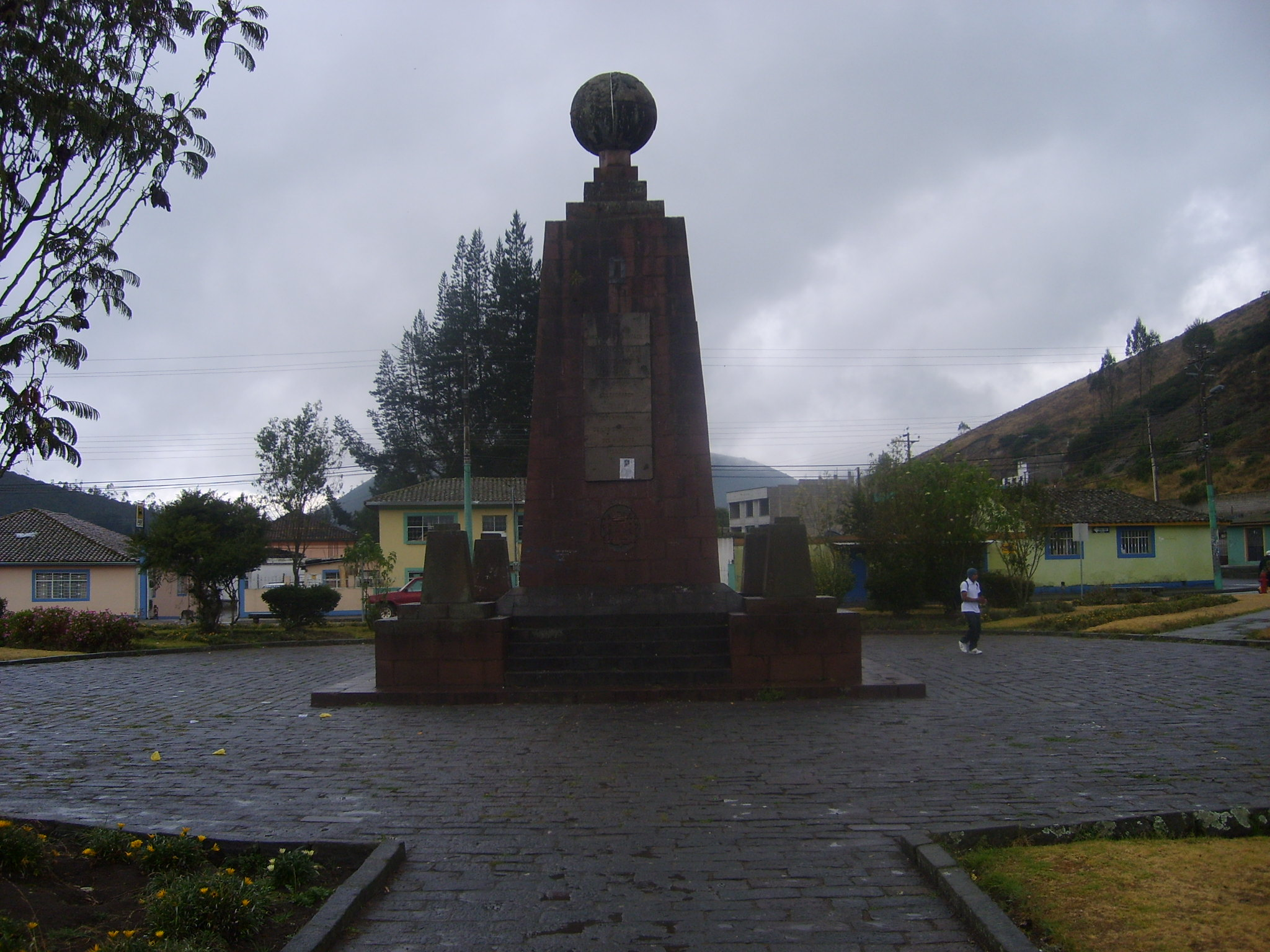
Older monument to the equator in Calacalí (2008)

The Ciudad Mitad del Mundo (Middle of the World City) is a tract of land owned by the prefecture of the province of Pichincha, Ecuador. It is located at San Antonio parish of the canton of Quito, 26 kilometers (16 mi) north of the center of Quito. The grounds contain the Monument to the Equator, which highlights the exact location of the Equator (from which the country takes its name) and commemorates the eighteenth-century Franco-Spanish Geodesic Mission which fixed its approximate location; they also contain the Museo Etnográfico Mitad del Mundo, Ethnographic Museum Middle of the Earth, a museum about the indigenous people ethnography of Ecuador.

The 30-meter-tall (98 ft) monument was constructed between 1979 and 1982 by Architect and Contractor Alfredo Fabián Páez with Carlos Mancheno President of Pichincha's Province Council to replace an older, smaller monument built by the Government of Ecuador under the direction of the geographer Luis Tufiño in 1936. It is made of iron and concrete and covered with cut and polished andesite stone. The monument was built to commemorate the first Geodesic Mission of the French Academy of Sciences, led by Louis Godin, Pierre Bouguer and Charles Marie de La Condamine, who, in the year 1736, conducted experiments to test the flattening at the poles of the characteristic shape of the Earth, by comparing the distance between a degree meridian in the equatorial zone to another level measured in Sweden. The older monument was moved seven kilometers (4.3 mi) to a small town near there called Calacalí.

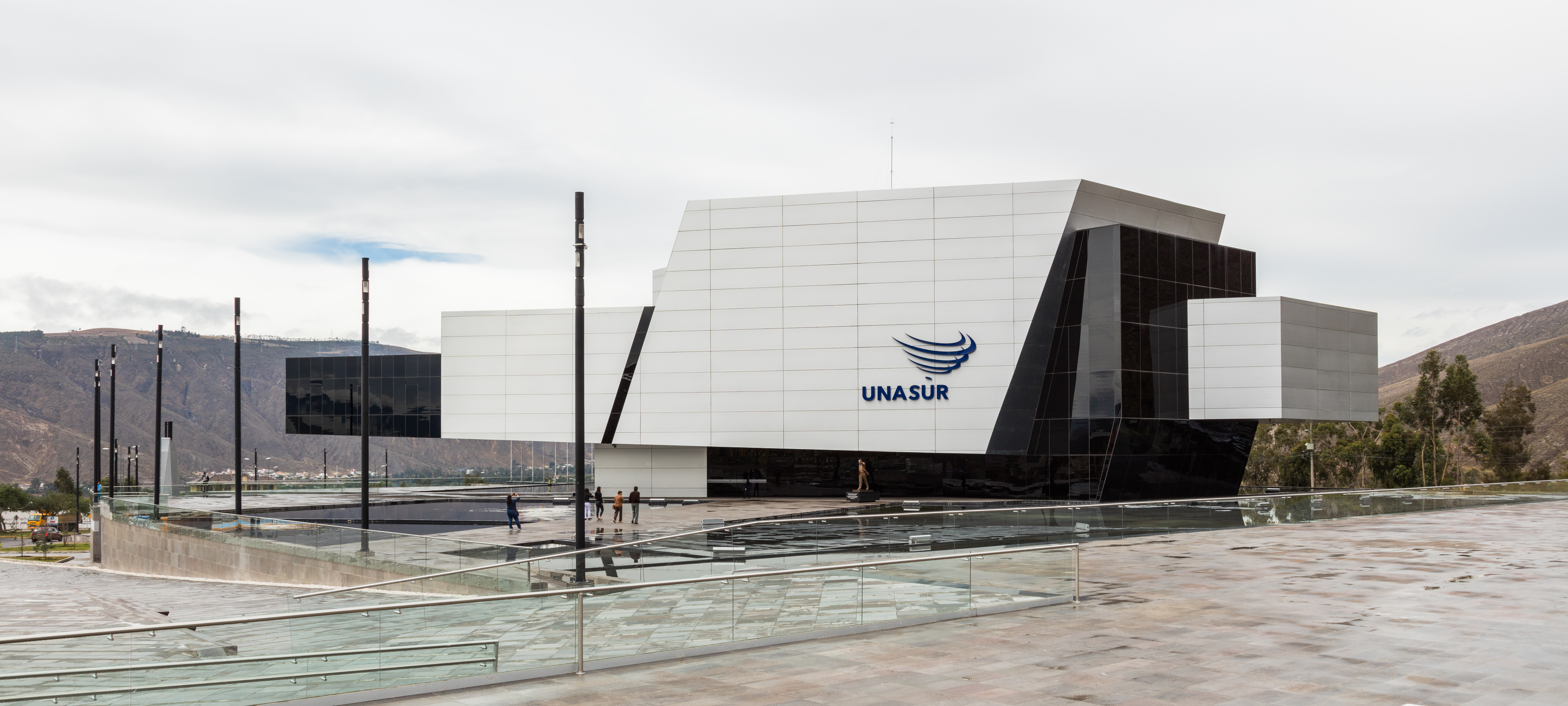
UNASUR headquarters.

The UNASUR former headquarters is located in this place, but is now in disuse following Ecuador's withdrawal from the organization in 2019.

== The French Geodesic Mission ==
The placement of the equatorial line was defined throughout a 1736 expedition called the French Geodesic Mission. While such studies would later determine the exact measure and shape of the world, astronomers involved missed the possibility of encountering the remnants of highly sophisticated geographical achievements made on “Equatorial” territory for hundreds of years before their arrival. Throughout the time the astronomers attempted to measure the length of a degree of latitude on that part of the planet, a group of different sorts of ruins (built by the Quitu-Cara culture) were found nearby the territory where they thought the Equatorial line passed through. Years after that, it was brought to light that the "Geodesic Mission" had been wrong about the exact coordinates where the line passed through—the measurements had indeed proved the world was oblate and not elongated (egg-shaped) at the poles, but their studies to define the placement of the equator were incorrect by 240 meters (790 ft). The Catequilla ruins found throughout the expedition between 1735 and 1745 were actually situated at latitude 0 (0°0′0″N 78°25′43″W), or the exact position where the Equatorial line crosses.

In 1935, the Ecuadorean Government built a ten-meter-high (33 ft) monument to honor the French expedition under the guidance of local geographer Luis Gudiño. In 1972, that monument was replaced by a thirty-meter-high (98 ft) monument titled “Ciudad Mitad del Mundo” (Middle of the World City)).

== Latitude discrepancy ==
Based on data obtained by Tufiño, it was believed that the equator passed through those two sites. However, according to readings based on the World Geodetic System WGS84, used in modern GPS systems and GIS products, the equator actually lies about 240 metres (790 ft) north of the marked line.

Over the years, countless tourists have had their pictures taken straddling the line drawn down the center of the east-facing staircase and across the plaza.

The pyramidal monument, with each side facing a cardinal direction is topped by a globe which is 4.5 metres (15 ft) in diameter and weighs 5 tonnes (4.9 long tons; 5.5 short tons). Inside the monument is a small museum that displays a variety of indigenous items pertaining to Ecuadorian culture: clothing, descriptions of the various ethnic groups, and examples of their activities.

Ciudad Mitad del Mundo contains other attractions such as a planetarium, a miniature model of Quito, and restaurants. On weekends, Ciudad Mitad del Mundo's Central Plaza hosts varied musical and cultural events for tourists. Also, there are diverse local handcraft stores and local food served at several cafés along a small colonial town.

== Intiñan Solar Museum ==
200 metres (660 ft) northeast of the Ethnographic Museum Monument is a local private attraction, known as the Intiñan Solar Museum, reportedly built to mark the Equator, although modern measurements suggest that it no longer does.

Along with exhibitions of Ecuadoran culture, the museum professes to be a destination for natural science tourism. Tour guides and visitors demonstrate tricks which are supposedly possible only on the Equator, such as water flowing both counter-clockwise or clockwise down a drain due to the Coriolis effect. However, the Coriolis force has no effect on the apparent direction of draining water in household drains anywhere on Earth, as this is too small of a scale of motion to be affected by the larger-scale force. Another apparent trick performed here is balancing eggs on end. This is purportedly easier at the equator due to the claim of a relative maximum in the magnetic field at the equator. However, attempts to balance eggs work just as well anywhere else on Earth, and are not influenced by magnetism or the Coriolis force. Also, there is an apparent weakening of muscles due to low latitude. This is also linked to the claim that certain physical forces, including the Coriolis force, are significantly weakened at the equator. Many of the demonstrations and associated claims made by tour guides are inconsistent with each other.
