= Pululahua =

Mountain in Ecuador

Coordinates: 0.038°N 78.463°W

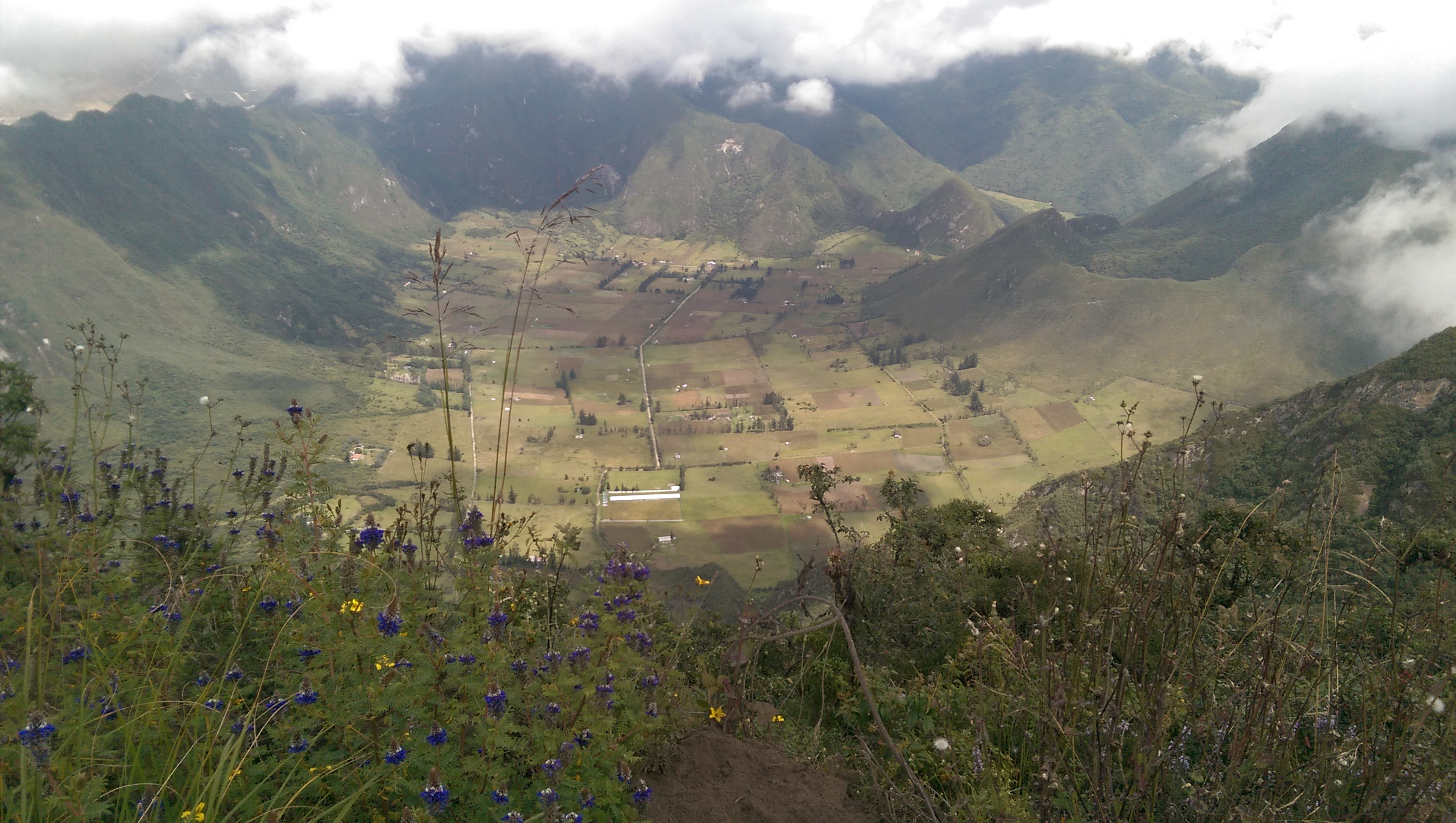
- Pululahua in Reserva Geobotánica Pululahua

Highest point
- Elevation: 3,360 m (11,020 ft)

Dimensions
- Width: 4 km (2.5 mi)
- Area: 13 km^{2} (5.0 mi^{2})

Geography
- Country: Ecuador
- District: Pichincha Province
- Settlement: Quito

Geology
- Formed by: Subduction
- Orogeny: Andean Orogeny
- Rock age: 40 ka
- Mountain type(s): Caldera, Lava dome
- Rock type(s): Andesite, Dacite
- Volcanic belt: Andes Mountains
- Last eruption: 290 CE

Pululahua is a dormant volcano in the north of Quito Canton, Pichincha Province, Ecuador. The volcano is in the Western Cordillera of the northern Ecuadorian Andes, approximately west-southwest of Mojanda and north of Casitahua volcanoes. Pululahua's caldera is approximately 5 km wide.The volcano is within an Ecuadorian national park known as Reserva Geobotánica Pululahua.

== Geology ==
Volcanism at Pululagua is the result of subduction as the Nazca plate subducts under the South American plate. Research show that past eruptions were large and violent, with the last eruption taking place in 290 CE. Past eruptions have deposited ash between 10 and 1000 m thick.

In 467 BCE, Pululahua erupted, sending volcanic ash over much of the western Ecuadorian lowland regions, which greatly reduced the expressions of the Chorrera and Cotocollao cultures.

=== Eruptive phases ===
Past eruptive events have been broken down into four main eruptive units:

(Data below references)

- Units I & II (~ 40-11 ka). Initial activity was marked by effusive dome building events. This included large voluminous Dacite lava domes, which is highly evolved magma. Eruptive volumes averaged 0.098 km³/ky during this phase. This is described as low to moderate eruptive rates. Ages of each eruption is poorly documented. Unit II had the highest eruptive volume. Half of total eruptive volume happened in this phase (~2.5 km³).

After initial volcanism, volcanic activity largely ceased for around 9 ka (~11-2.5 ka). The one exception was a minor event ~6 ka.

- Unit III (~2.5-2.3 ka). Volcanic activity resumed with a more violent and voluminous eruptive phases. These eruptions were highly explosive and created the 13 square kilometer caldera. Eruptive rates skyrocket to (~2.675 km³/ky), >6× higher than Unit II.
- Unit IV (~2.2 ka-present). This phase was characterized by central dome volcanic cone building. Eruptive rates are highest in this phase, (~12.578 km³/ky).

=== Current activity ===
Even though Pululahua has not erupted in almost 2,000 years, CO2 data shows an active magma chamber still exists under the volcano. Taking 350 soil samples from 3.36 square kilometers on the caldera floor, large amounts of CO2 is being degassed at around about 59–97 tonnes per day. This also poses a risk to animals and humans living in the caldera.
