= Nono, Ecuador =

Rural parish in Pichincha Province, Ecuador

Coordinates: 0.066969°S 78.577502°W

Nono is a rural parish in the municipality of Quito in the Province of Pichincha, Ecuador.
