= Cotocollao, Quito =

Parish in Quito, Ecuador

Coordinates: 0.11686°S 78.49978°W

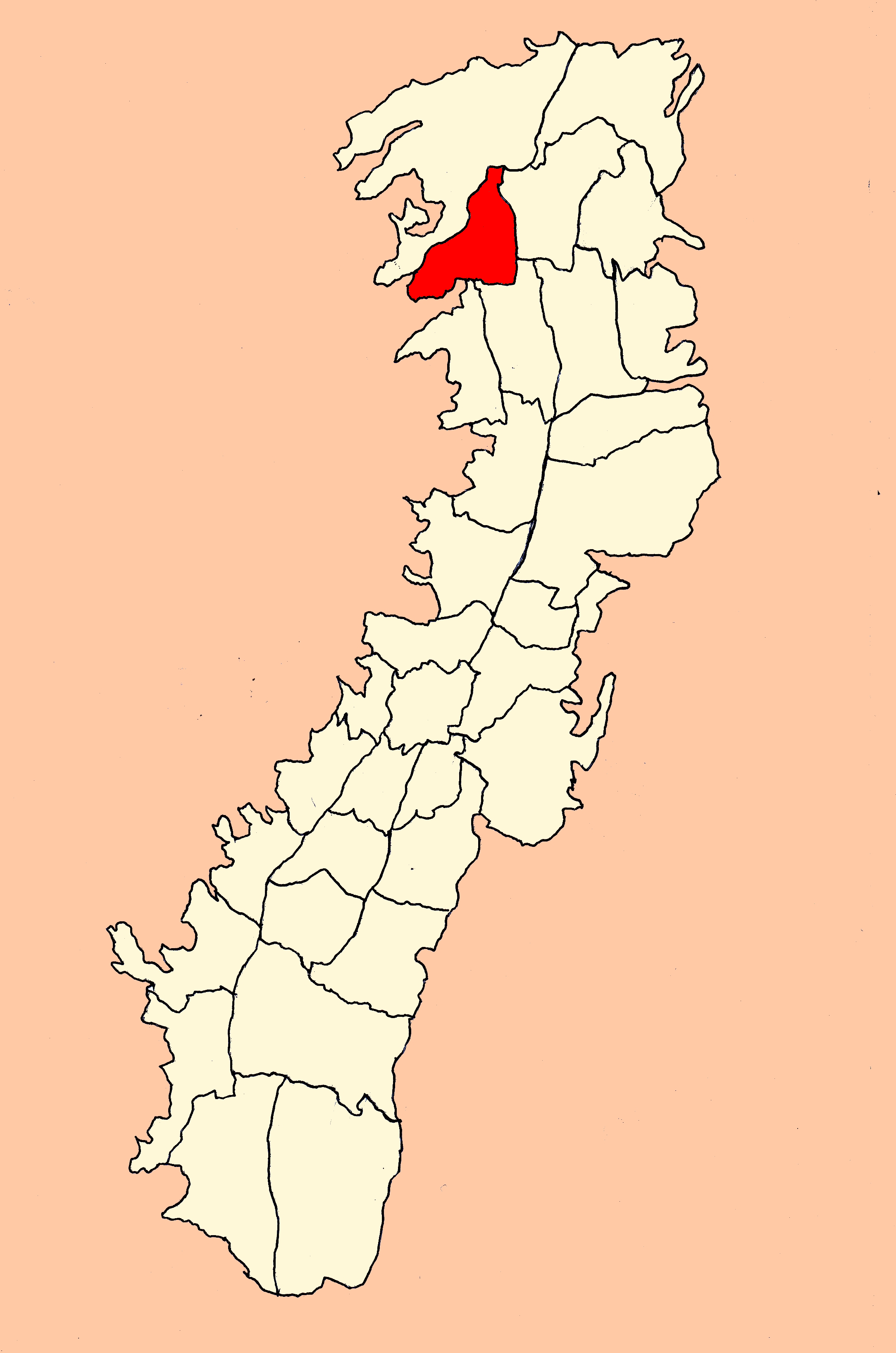
Cotocollao Parish

The Cotocollao Parish is a parish in northwest Quito, Ecuador. It is one of the biggest parishes of the city. The use of the area is primarily residential, however it also has a very active commercial zone around the Avenida de La Prensa and has the "El Condado" shopping mall.

Cotocollao has a central plaza with an old Catholic church, named "San Juan Bautista de Cotocollao", this was the first church built at north of the city. There are many older buildings in this section of Quito that contrast the more recent architecture of modern buildings. The Cotocollao Parish contains the "Aurelio Espinoza Pólit" library which is notable for researchers since it has one of the most complete collections of old Ecuadorian books. It also contains the Estadio Rodrigo Paz Delgado, a stadium which is the home field for the soccer team "Liga." El Centro del Muchacho Trabajador, or The Working Boy Center, has a complex located in Cotocollao.
