= Quito Canton =

Coordinates: 0°13′S 78°31′W

Quito
- Canton
- Metropolitan District of Quito
- Flag Seal

- Location of Pichincha Province in Ecuador.

- Quito Canton in Pichincha Province
- Country: Ecuador
- Province: Pichincha
- Established: December 6, 1534
- Named for: Quitu
- Seat: Quito

Government
  - Mayor: Pabel Muñoz

Area
  - Canton: 4,196 km^{2} (1,620 sq mi)
- Highest elevation: 4,500 m (14,800 ft)
- Lowest elevation: 2,400 m (7,900 ft)

Population (2022 census)
  - Canton: 2,679,722
  - Density: 638.6/km^{2} (1,654/sq mi)
  - Urban: 1,763,275
- Time zone: UTC-5 (ECT)
- Website: https://www.quito.gob.ec/

Quito, officially the Metropolitan District of Quito (Spanish: Distrito Metropolitano de Quito), is a canton in the province of Pichincha, Ecuador.

== Governance ==
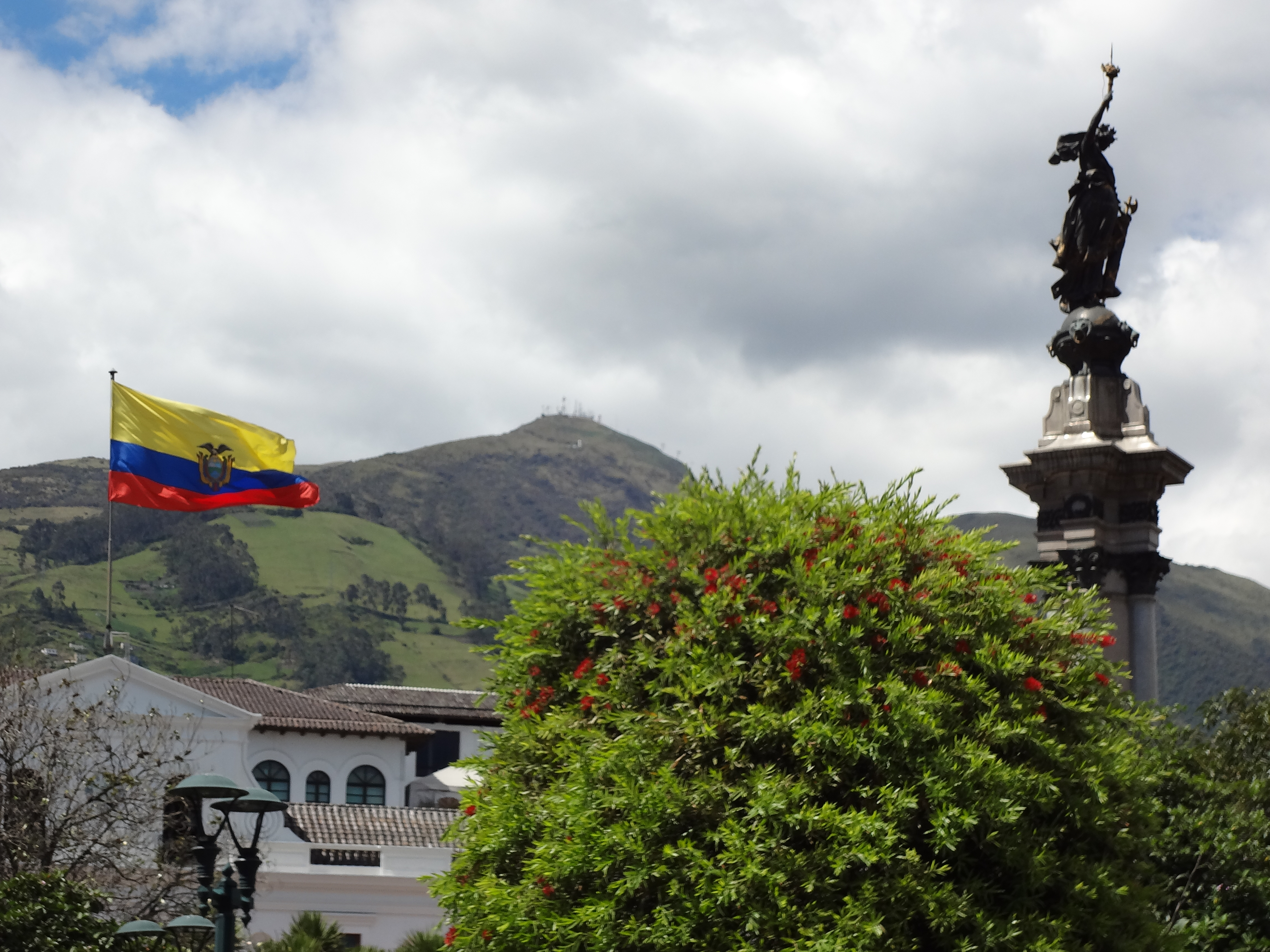
Independence Square in the Historic Center of Quito.

The Municipality of Quito (officially the Municipality of the Metropolitan District of Quito) is the governing body of the city of Quito and the Metropolitan District. Its headquarters are at the Municipal Palace, located on the east side of the Plaza de La Independencia. The municipality is made of two principal organs: the mayor's office and a fifteen-member city council.

=== Administrative zones ===
The city and canton is administered through eleven Administrative Municipal Zones. Each zone, classified as either urban or suburban, has their own administrator and contain can both urban and rural parishes. They are (parishes covered in parentheses):

Urban

- Sur

(Chillogallo, La Ecuatoriana, Guamaní, Quitumbe, Turubamba)

- Centro Sur

(La Argelia, Chilibulo, Chimbacalle, La Ferrovaria, Lloa, La Magdalena, La Mena, San Bartolo, Solanda)

- Centro

(Centro Histórico, Itchimbia, La Libertad, Puengasí, San Juan)

- Norte

(Belisario Quevedo, Cochapamba, La Concepción, El Inca, Iñaquito, Jipijapa, Kennedy, Mariscal Sucre, Nayón, Rumipamba, Zámbiza)

- Centro Norte

(Calacalí, Carcelén, Comité del Pueblo, El Concado, Cotocallao, Nono, Pomasquí, Ponceano, San Antonio)

Suburban

- Noroccidental

(Gualea, Nanegal, Nanegalito, Pacto)

- Norcentral

(Atahualpa, Chavezpamba, Perucho, Puellero, San José de Minas)

- Calderón

(Calderón, Llano Chico)

- Tumbaco

(Cumbayá, Tumbaco)

- Los Chillos

(Alangasí, Amaguaña, Conocoto, Guangopolo, La Merced, Pintag)

- Aeropuerto

(Checa, Guayllabamba, Pifo, Puembo, El Quinche, Tababela, Yaruquí)

== Population figures ==
According to the 2001 census, the total population of Quito (not the city itself) is 1,839,853, with 892,570 men and 947,283 women. According to the 2007 estimates, it is 1,840,000. Of this, the population of the urban parishes (the city of Quito itself) was 1,399,378, and the population of the rural parishes (outside of the city of Quito but still within the canton) was 440,475. The total population density of the canton is 439.8 inhabitants per km² (1139.1/mi²). The total number of households in the canton is 555,928, with 419,845 in the urban area (the city) and 136,083 in the rural area. Of the 1,407,526 inhabitants of the canton over the age of 12, 639,068 are married, 541,758 are single, 33,116 are divorced, 30,898 are separated, and 47,930 are widowed.

Overall, the canton's illiteracy rate is 4.3% – 5.3% for women, 3.2% for men, 3.6% in the urban area (the city), and 6.6% in the rural area. The unemployment rate of the city is 8.9%, and 43.8% are underemployed. The average monthly income is $317.

== Political divisions ==
The canton is divided into 55 parishes (Spanish: parroquias), classified as either urban or rural. The canton has more parishes than any other canton in Ecuador. The urban parishes make up the city of Quito. (map):

Rural parishes

- Alangasi
- Amaguaña
- Alangasí
- Atahualpa
- Calacalí
- Calderón
- Chabezpamba
- Checa
- Cumbayá
- Gualea
- Gualea Cruz
- Guangopolo
- Guayllabamba
- Llano Chico
- Lloa
- Merced, La
- Nanegal
- Nanegalito
- Nayón
- Nono
- Pacto
- Perucho
- Pifo
- Pintag
- Pomasqui
- Puellaro
- Puembo
- El Quinche
- San Antonio de Pichincha
- San José de Minas
- Tababela
- Tumbaco
- Yaruquí
- Zámbiza

Urban parishes

- Argelia, La
- Belisario Quevedo
- Carcelén
- Centro Histórico
- Chilibulo
- Chillogallo
- Chimbacalle
- Cochapamba
- Comité del Pueblo
- Concepción, La
- Condado, El
- Cotocollao
- Ecuatoriana, La
- Ferroviaria, La
- Guamaní
- Inca, El
- Iñaquito
- Itchimbía
- Jipijapa
- Kennedy
- La Libertad
- Magdalena
- Mariscal Sucre
- Mena, La
- Ponceano
- Puengasí
- Quitumbe
- Rumipamba
- San Bartolo
- San Juan
- Solanda
- Turubamba

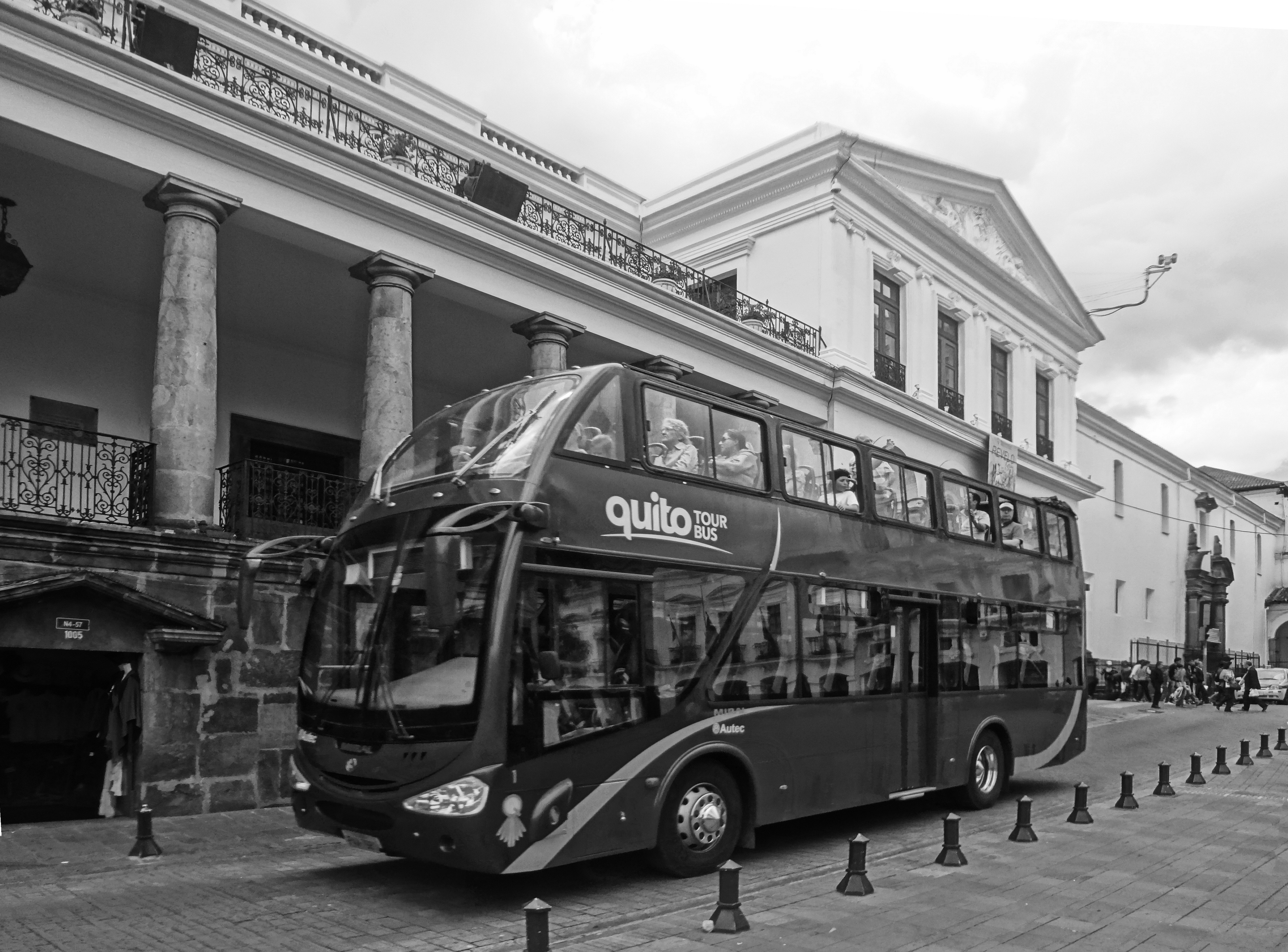
A double-decker tourist bus in front of The Presidential Palace in the Historic Center of Quito.

=== Administrative zones ===
The canton is divided into 11 administrative zones that decentralize the municipality and participate in a system of active management. Each zone, classified as either urban or suburban, has their own administrator and contain can both urban and rural parishes. They are (parishes covered in parentheses):

Urban

- Sur

(Chillogallo, La Ecuatoriana, Guamaní, Quitumbe, Turubamba)

- Centro Sur

(La Argelia, Chilibulo, Chimbacalle, La Ferrovaria, Lloa, La Magdalena, La Mena, San Bartolo, Solanda)

- Centro

(Centro Histórico, Itchimbia, La Libertad, Puengasí, San Juan)

- Centro Norte

(Belisario Quevedo, Cochapamba, La Concepción, El Inca, Iñaquito, Jipijapa, Kennedy, Mariscal Sucre, Nayón, Rumipamba, Zámbiza)

- Norte

(Calacalí, Carcelén, Comité del Pueblo, El Concado, Cotocallao, Nono, Pomasquí, Ponceano, San Antonio)

Suburban

- Noroccidental

(Gualea, Nanegal, Nanegalito, Pacto)

- Norcentral

(Atahualpa, Chavezpamba, Perucho, Puellero, San José de Minas)

- Calderón

(Calderón, Llano Chico)

- Tumbaco

(Cumbayá, Tumbaco)

- Los Chillos

(Alangasí, Amaguaña, Conocoto, Guangopolo, La Merced, Pintag)

- Aeropuerto

(Checa, Guayllabamba, Pifo, Puembo, El Quinche, Tababela, Yaruquí)

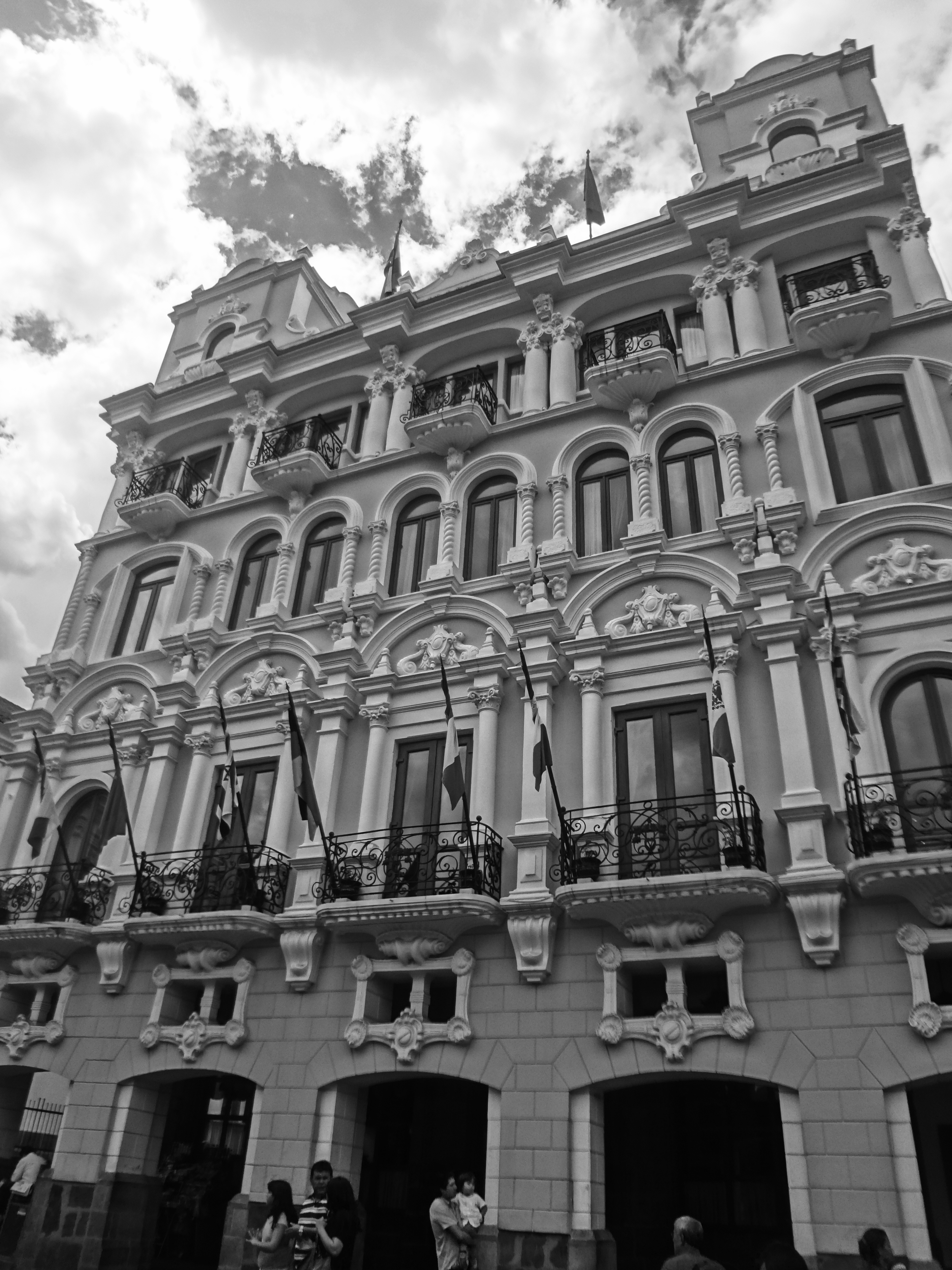
Hotel Plaza Grande is located in the Plaza de la Independencia, Historic Center of Quito

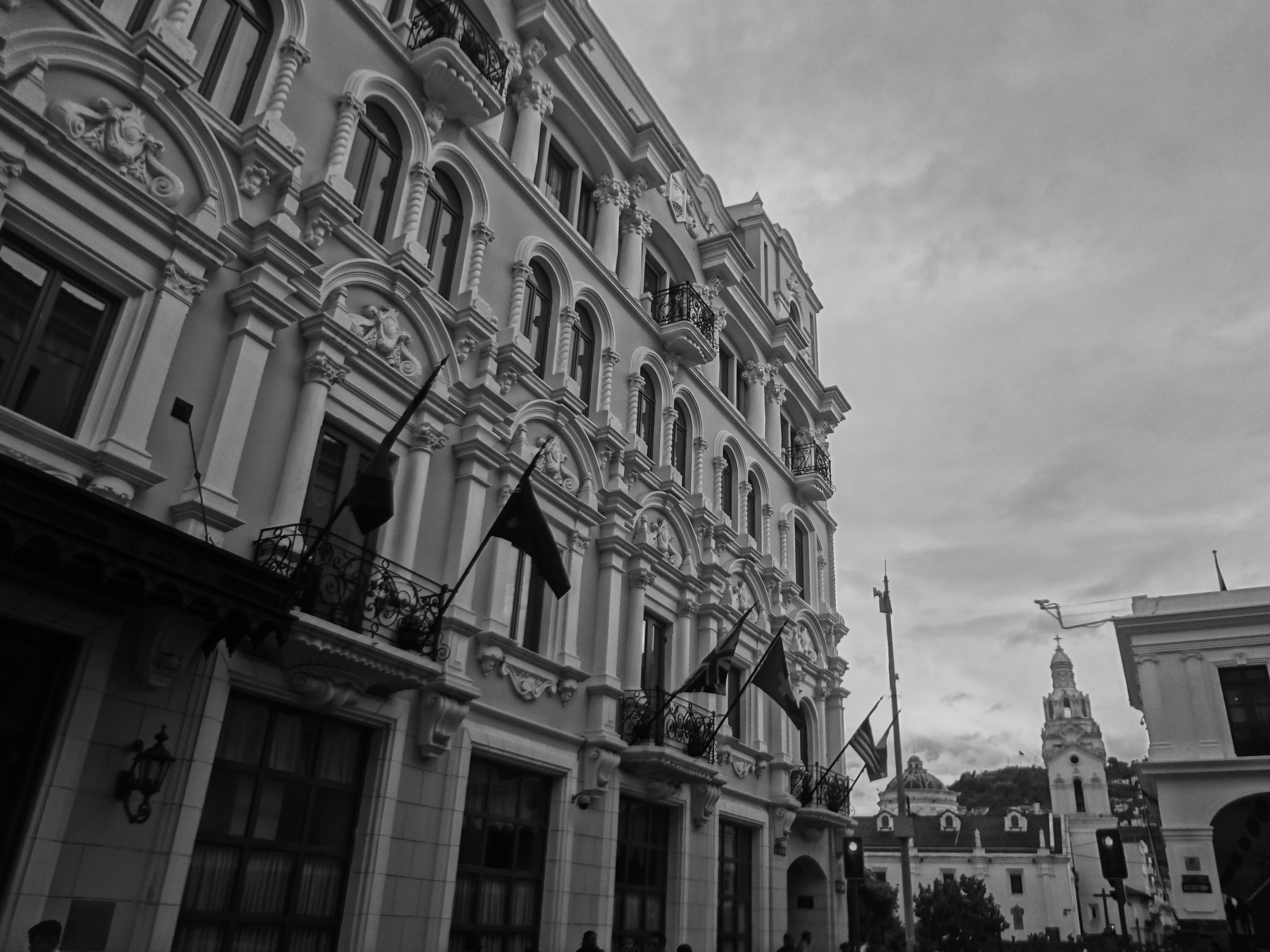
Hotel Plaza Grande
